= Russell Carhouse =

Rail yard of the Toronto Transit Commission

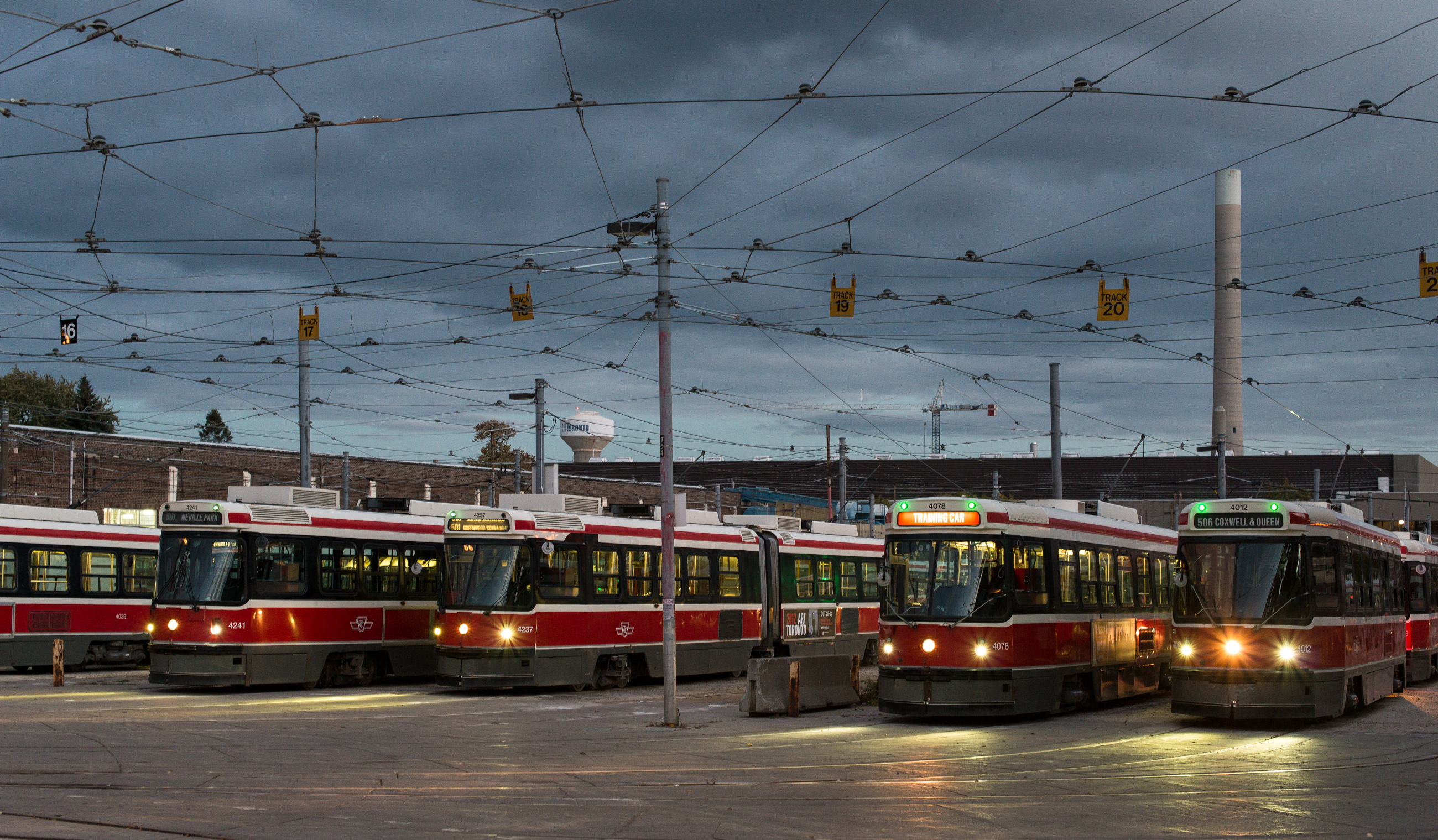

General information
- Location: 1433 Queen Street East; Toronto, Ontario; Canada
- Coordinates: 43°39′51″N 79°19′22″W
- Operator: Toronto Transit Commission
- Tracks: 22

Construction
- Structure type: Maintenance and storage facility

History
- Opened: 1913
- Rebuilt: 1924
Location

The Russell Carhouse, located at Queen Street East and Connaught Avenue just east of Greenwood Avenue in Toronto, is the Toronto Transit Commission's second oldest carhouse.

Russell Carhouse used to store and maintain high-floor streetcars which have all been retired from service. It is currently used to store and dispatch a small number of low-floor streetcars. The carhouse has not yet been adapted to maintain low-floor streetcars, but the TTC plans to renovate the carhouse to do so.

External image
- Russell Division track plan (1995)

== Namesake ==
An article in a 1978 issue of the TTC's internal magazine, The Coupler, asserts that the carhouse is named for T.A. (Tommy Alexander) Russell (founder of Russell Motor Car Company) and friend of Robert John Fleming a former Mayor of Toronto and general manager of the Toronto Railway Company. However, a member of Ontario's Provincial Parliament, Joseph Russell, was also a friend to Fleming, and his brick manufacturing yard was near the carhouse, and supplied brick for the carhouse. Transit historian Ray Corley asserts the yard was more likely named after Joseph Russell, due to the proximity of his yard, and due to playing a role in the facility's construction.

== History ==
Russell Carhouse was built in 1913 by the Toronto Railway Company as a paint shop. When the TRC's King Carhouse burnt down in 1916, Russell was rapidly turned into a carhouse. In 1921, the TTC took over and amalgamated all the existing streetcar systems within the city limits. By 1922, it had acquired land on the west side of the carhouse building to build a 15-track storage yard. The TTC found that the carhouse foundations were faulty and the facility was sinking. They called for tenders for its demolition and the construction of a new carhouse which opened on December 13, 1924. A separate traffic office building was constructed at the corner of Queen Street and Connaught Avenue. The only surviving part of the 1913 carhouse is a wing on its east side facing Connaught Avenue; it contained offices, a store room and a boiler room.

In 1922 the TTC added fire equipment to its St. Clair Carhouse, Danforth Carhouse, Russell Carhouse and Lansdowne Carhouse.

In August 1928, the ladder tracks at the south end of the Russell yard were moved 15 feet (4.6 m) to the north in order to widen Eastern Avenue to 4 lanes.

Between 1927 and 1936, radial cars for the Scarboro radial line were stored at Russell Carhouse. The TTC took over Scarboro radial operation in 1927 and connected the radial line to Bingham Loop for carhouse movements.

By 2011, when the TTC contracted with Bombardier Transportation to replace its fleet of streetcars with modern, low-floor streetcars, some consideration was given to refurbishing the maintenance facilities at the Russell facility to accommodate the vehicles, rather than build a new half billion dollar facility. The site chosen for the Leslie Barns carhouse was only a few hundred yards away from the Russell facility. Local city councilor Mary-Margaret McMahon argued for improving the Russell facility in 2011. In the end the new Leslie carhouse was built. But the Russell facility was to remain open to store new vehicles not requiring maintenance work.

In 2012, the crossover (with tracks effectively forming a reversing wye) on Connaught Avenue near Queen Street was eliminated when the tracks there were replaced. The wye allowed single-ended streetcars to be turned to face the wrong way within the yard. This allowed the front wheels of a streetcar to be positioned on a wheel truing machine in the carhouse, a practice that became obsolete with the introduction of the CLRV. This was the last remaining on-street crossover on the system.

In 2015, the ladder tracks at the south end of the Russell yard were replaced. Eastern Avenue at that location was narrowed to build a fence to keep road and pedestrian traffic off the ladder switches. A pedestrian sidewalk was built along the south side of the fence. The ladder area at the south end of the carhouse building was regraded to reduce the effect of sharp curves on a grade.

In September 2015, Russell Carhouse serviced about half of the system's CLRV and ALRV streetcar fleet. At that time, the facility served the 502 Downtowner and 503 Kingston Road routes exclusively, and along with Roncesvalles Carhouse, served the 501 Queen, 504 King, 505 Dundas, 506 Carlton, 509 Harbourfront, 510 Spadina routes.

In January 2020, after retirement of the CLRV and ALRV fleet, the Russell Carhouse served only 501 Queen using Flexity Outlook streetcars. By January 2023, only 504 King streetcars were being stored at Russell.

== Future ==
Between September 2022 and February 2025, Russell Carhouse will be renovated as part of a $130 million project to renovate the facilities to provide maintenance capacity for new streetcars on order. Tracks will be replaced and the carhouse building will be extended and its interior modified to service low-floor streetcars. Overhead wiring will be converted for pantograph operation. Ballasted tracks will be replaced with concrete-embedded tracks in the yard to avoid trip hazards for TTC staff. Subsurface infrastructure such as fire mains, electrical ducts, etc. will be upgraded, and a new storm water collection and management system will be added.

As a second phase, the carhouse building will be upgraded between 2025 and 2028 to handle Flexity Outlook vehicles. With the interior renovations, there will be a new maintenance bay on the west side of the carhouse, reconfigured maintenance tracks and pits, and access to maintain rooftop-mounted equipment on Flexity streetcars.

== Doors Open 2014 ==
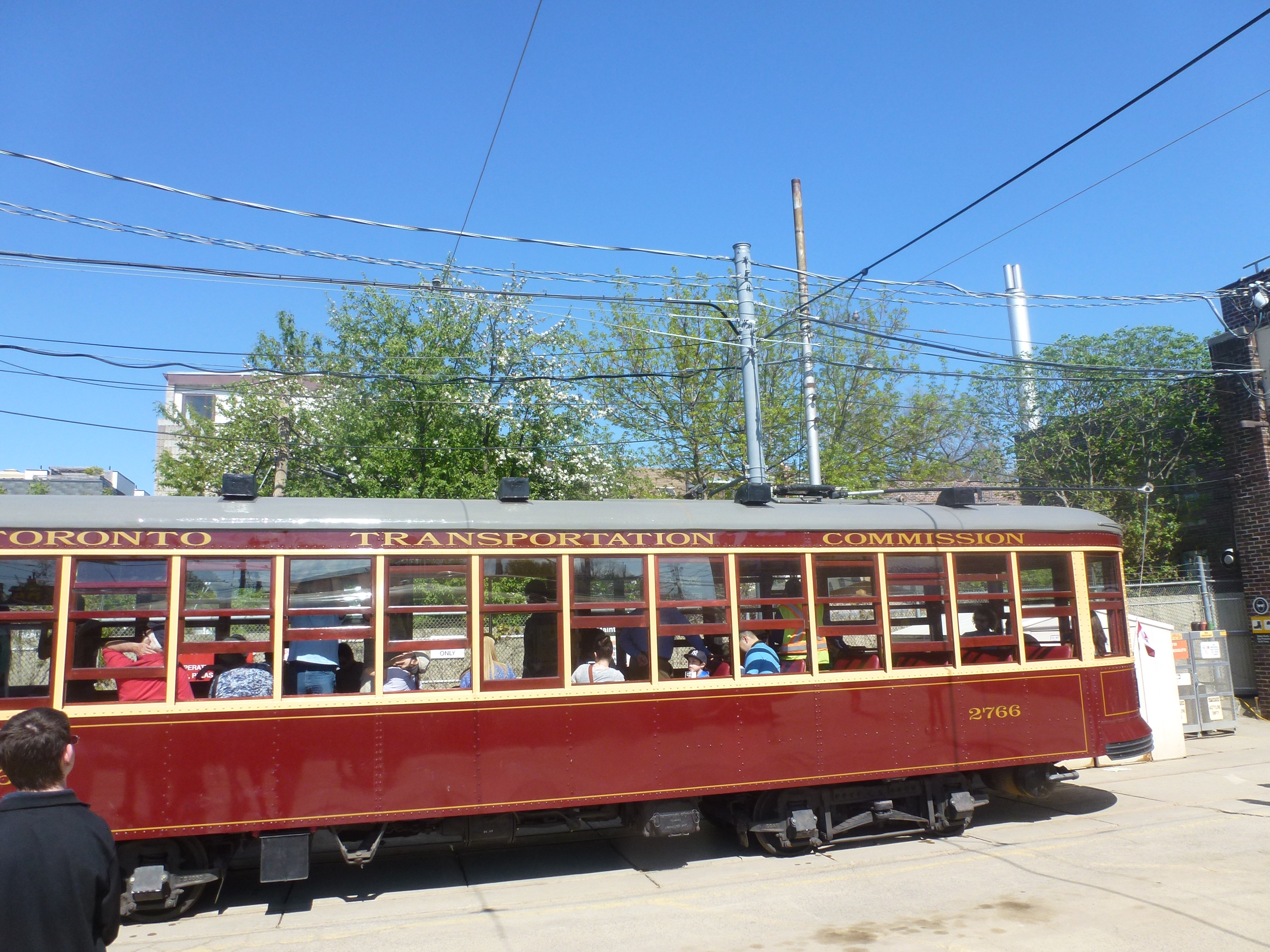
During the 2014 Doors Open Toronto event the TTC provided its legacy vehicles for the public to explore at the Russell Carhouse.

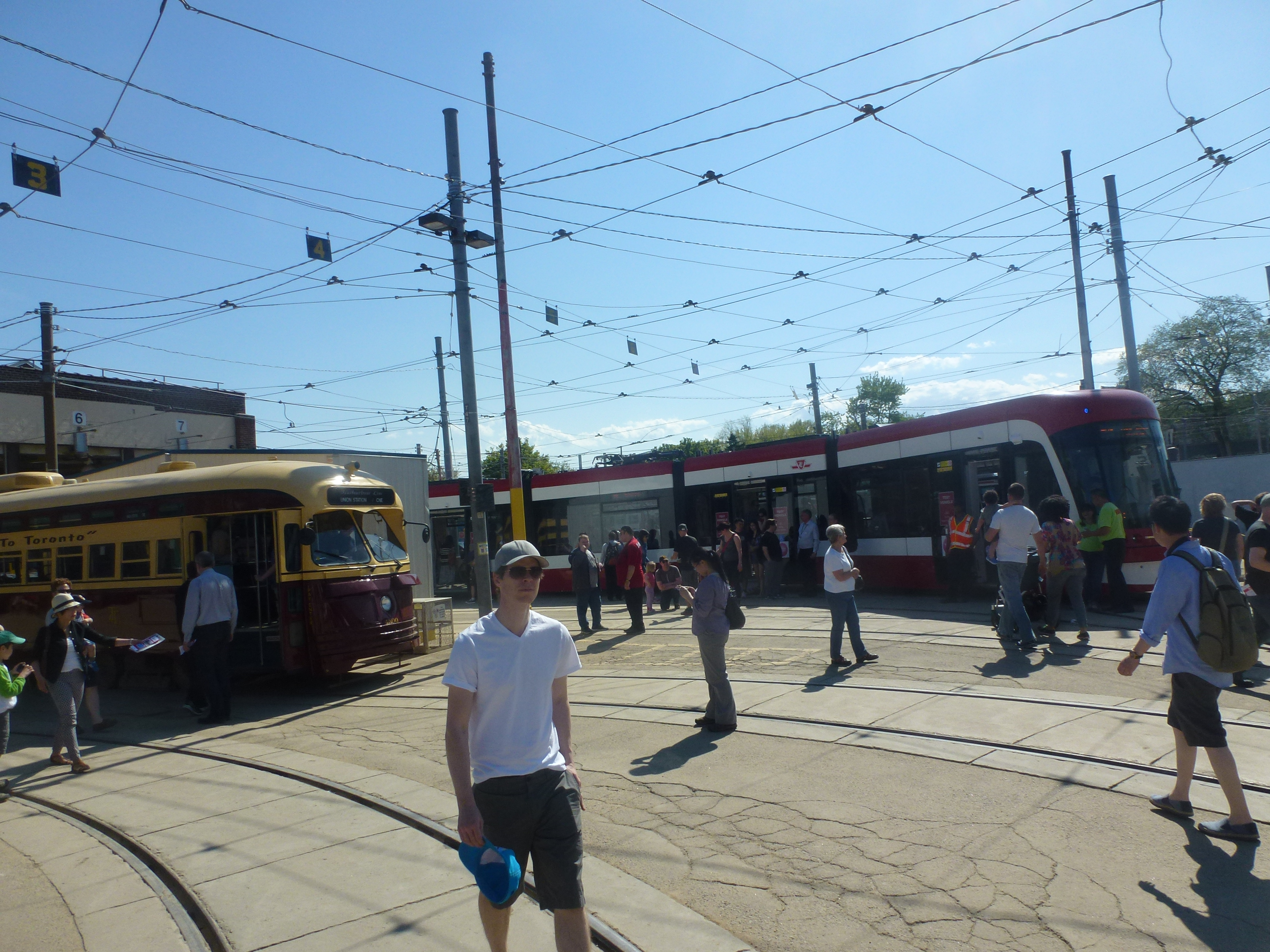
During the 2014 Doors Open Toronto event the TTC provided a prototype of its soon to be introduced Flexity low floor streetcars at the Russell Carhouse.

The Carhouse is normally closed to the public. But, in 2014, the TTC added the facility to Doors Open Toronto's list of buildings normally closed to the public which are opened to public tours for one weekend per year. For its public debut the TTC made available its small fleet of legacy heritage streetcars, and provided a prototype of its Flexity low floor streetcars, which were introduced to revenue service four months later.

In a review of the effectiveness of Doors Open as an educational tool, Allana Mayer, of the association of Art Libraries of North America, listed the Russell Carhouse as one of four "crowd favourites".
