= King Street Transit Priority Corridor =

Transit mall in Toronto, Ontario, Canada

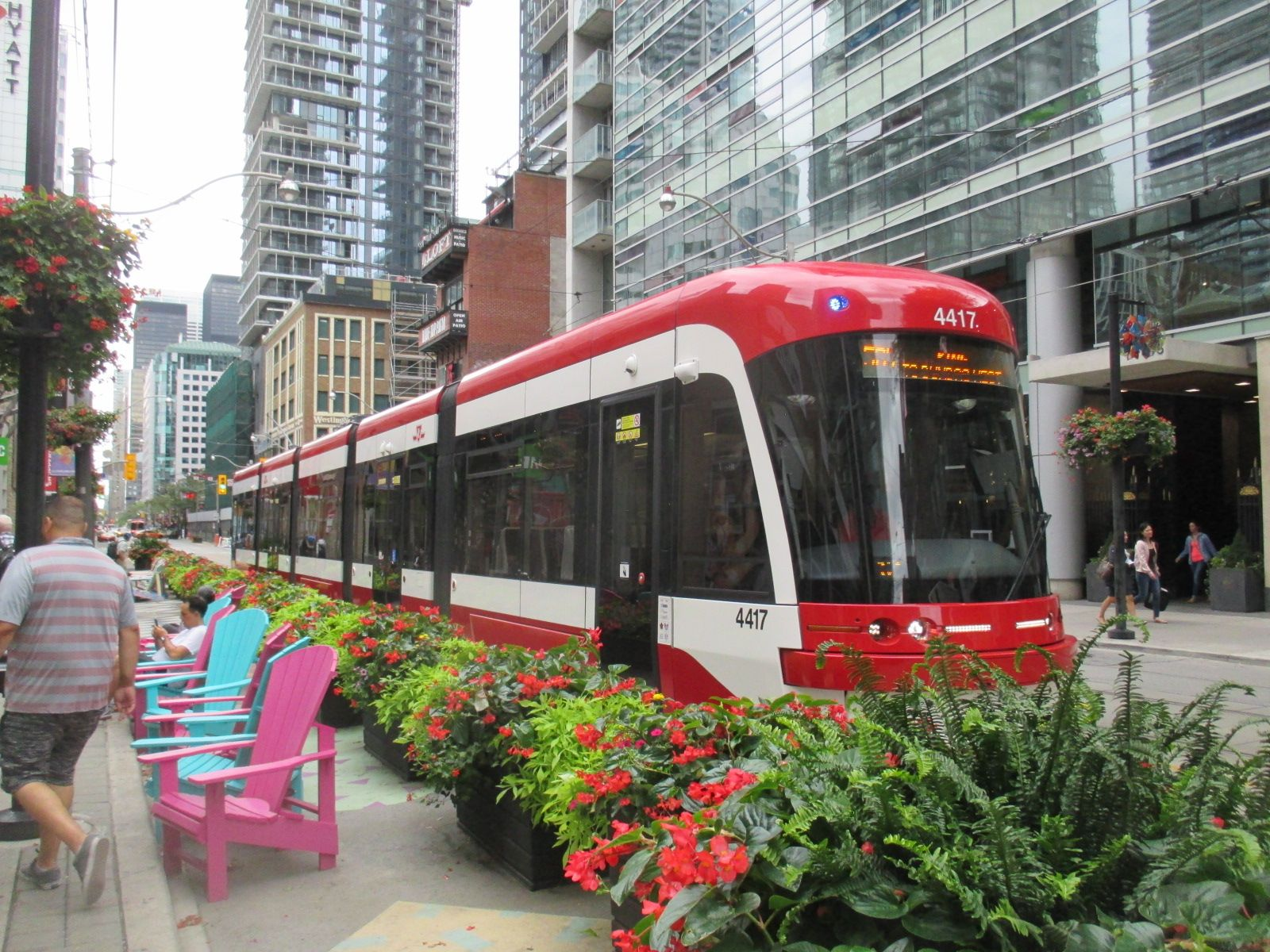
- The pilot project converted some parts of the curbside traffic lane into patios with furniture and planters.

Overview
- Operator: Toronto Transit Commission (TTC)
- Began service: November 12, 2017

Route
- Route type: Transit mall
- Locale: Toronto, Ontario
- Start: Jarvis Street
- End: Bathurst Street
- Length: 2.6 km (1.6 mi)

The King Street Transit Priority Corridor is a transit mall located along King Street between Jarvis and Bathurst Streets in Toronto, Ontario, Canada. It passes by two subway stations (King and St. Andrew) on Line 1 Yonge–University. The corridor was created by the King Street Pilot Project to improve streetcar reliability on downtown King Street. The corridor went into operation on November 12, 2017, and was made permanent by City Council on April 16, 2019. The corridor is 2.6 km (1.6 mi) long and spans 18 street intersections.

== Description ==
The corridor extends along King Street between Jarvis Street at the east end and Bathurst Street at the west. Private vehicles are allowed to use the corridor, but they may only travel up to three blocks along it before they are required to turn right out of the corridor. Other private vehicle restrictions include:

- Through traffic is allowed only for TTC vehicles, emergency vehicles, bicycles and road maintenance vehicles at all but two intersections. Because of high pedestrian volumes crossing the street, through traffic is allowed at Bay and John Streets. However, between 10 pm and 5 am, taxis may also pass through intersections.
- At most signalized intersections, automobile and truck traffic on King Street must turn right rather than continuing through. Simcoe and York Streets are exceptions as they are one-way streets.
- No left turns are allowed for automobile and truck traffic, except eastbound at Bathurst Street and westbound at Jarvis Street at the two ends of the corridor.
- On-street parking is prohibited, but some space is provided for loading zones and taxi stands.

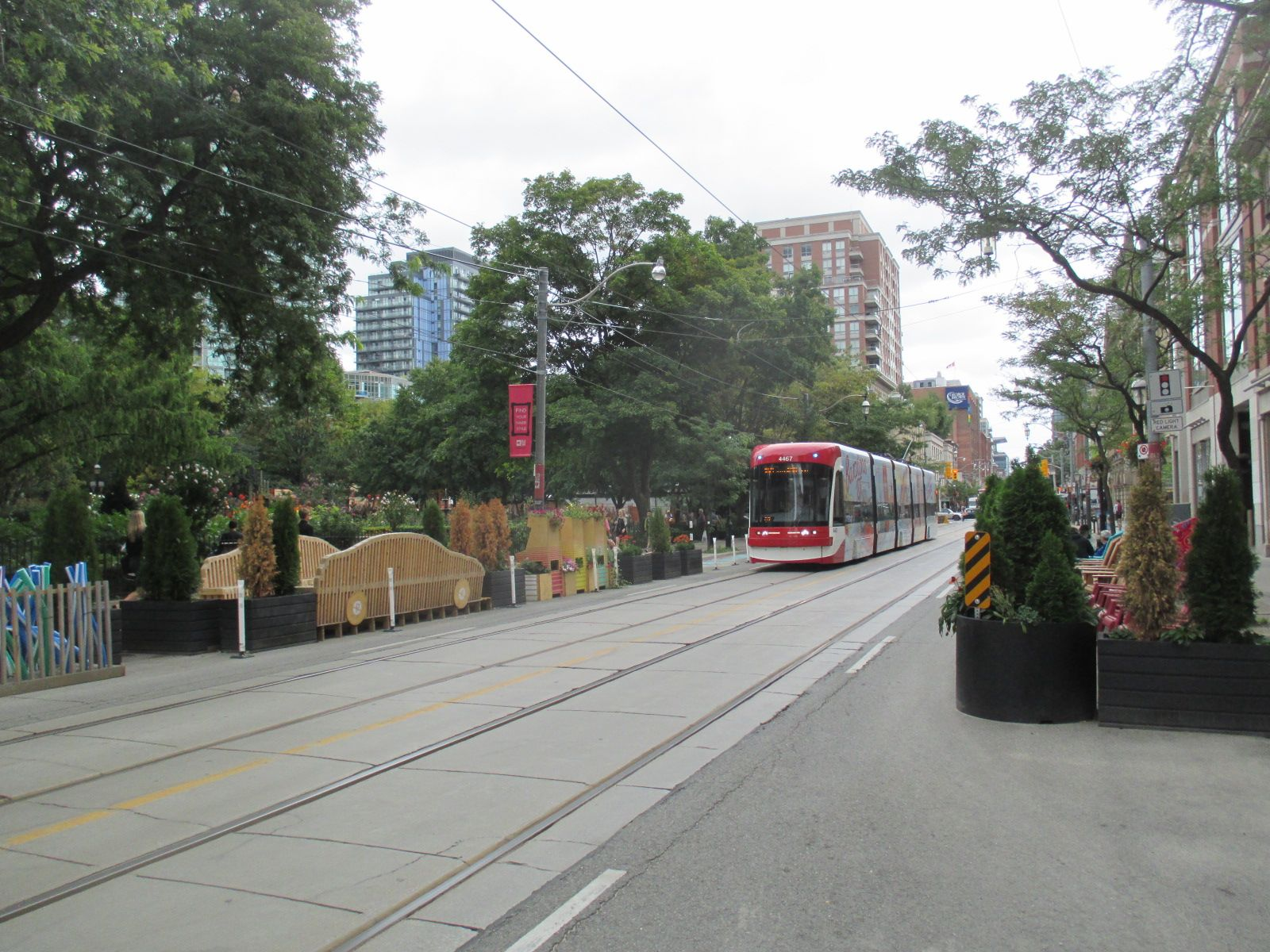
Planters, patios and artwork added along the streetcar tracks as part of the King Street Pilot Project

Most streetcar stops are far-side, with only the westbound stops at Portland and Bathurst Streets being near-side. Passengers board streetcars from delineated loading areas in the curb lane with barricades at each end to protect waiting passengers from traffic. Downtown Express buses along the corridor have separate stops from streetcars to avoid passenger and vehicle congestion.

Prior to the pilot project, the two curb lanes along King Street were used for rush-hour traffic and for parking in the off-hours. After the creation of the corridor, space in the curb lanes was converted for other uses such as seating, patios and bicycle parking in order to make the street more pedestrian-friendly. In 2018, three dozen streetscape improvements were made including eighteen patios, two parkettes and a number of spaces for artists and public displays. Fifteen patios were associated with private businesses (usually restaurants) that must pay the City a fee; three other patios were sponsored by businesses for public use. One space by Roy Thomson Hall is decorated by a wall of plastic crates holding planters separating a sitting area from the streetcar lanes. Another space east of Church Street has a road mural called "King's Buried Treasure" to commemorate former creeks long since buried.

== Routes serviced ==
The corridor is used by the following TTC routes:

Route	Name	Additional information
303	Kingston Road	Blue Night Streetcar service; eastbound to Victoria Park Avenue and westbound to Roncesvalles Avenue
304	King	Blue Night Streetcar service; eastbound to Broadview station and westbound to Dundas West station
503	Kingston Road	Streetcar; weekday daytime service; eastbound to Victoria Park Avenue from York Street
504A	King	Streetcar; westbound to Dundas West station and eastbound to Distillery Loop
504B	King	Streetcar; eastbound to Broadview station and westbound to Dufferin Gate Loop
508	Lake Shore	Streetcar; rush-hour service only; eastbound to Broadview station and westbound to Long Branch Loop

=== Service history ===
Initially, the principal routes using the corridor were the 504 King and 514 Cherry, which overlapped through the corridor. However, effective October 7, 2018, the 514 Cherry route was discontinued and replaced by two new branches of route 504 King, both of which also overlap through the corridor.

On February 20, 2018, route 503 Kingston Rd was modified from rush-hour only to full weekday service (evenings excluded) to increase capacity to support ridership in the corridor, which had increased along downtown King Street during the King Street Pilot Project. Along with this change, route 503 was extended west from York Street to Spadina Avenue and turned back at Charlotte Loop. As of January 7, 2019, the 503 route returned to shuttle bus operation to accommodate some construction projects; the 503 terminus was moved back to York Street. Effective September 3, 2019, 503 Kingston Rd service was again upgraded to run midday as well as during rush hours on weekdays.

On September 3, 2019, the TTC reintroduced rush-hour route 508 Lake Shore. It runs through the corridor eastbound in the morning peak period, and both ways during the afternoon peak. Also on the same date, route 503 Kingston Road was upgraded from rush-hour only service to include midday service on a trial basis.

Effective November 25, 2019, on a trial basis, the Downtown Express buses (routes 141–145) were relocated to the corridor in order to avoid traffic on their former route along Richmond and Adelaide Streets. All Downtown Express routes (141–145) passed both St. Andrew and King subway stations. On March 23, 2020, all the downtown express bus routes (141–145) were suspended due to reduced ridership during the COVID-19 pandemic, and by late October 2021, they had been delisted from the TTC customer website.

== Development of the corridor ==
=== Earlier efforts ===
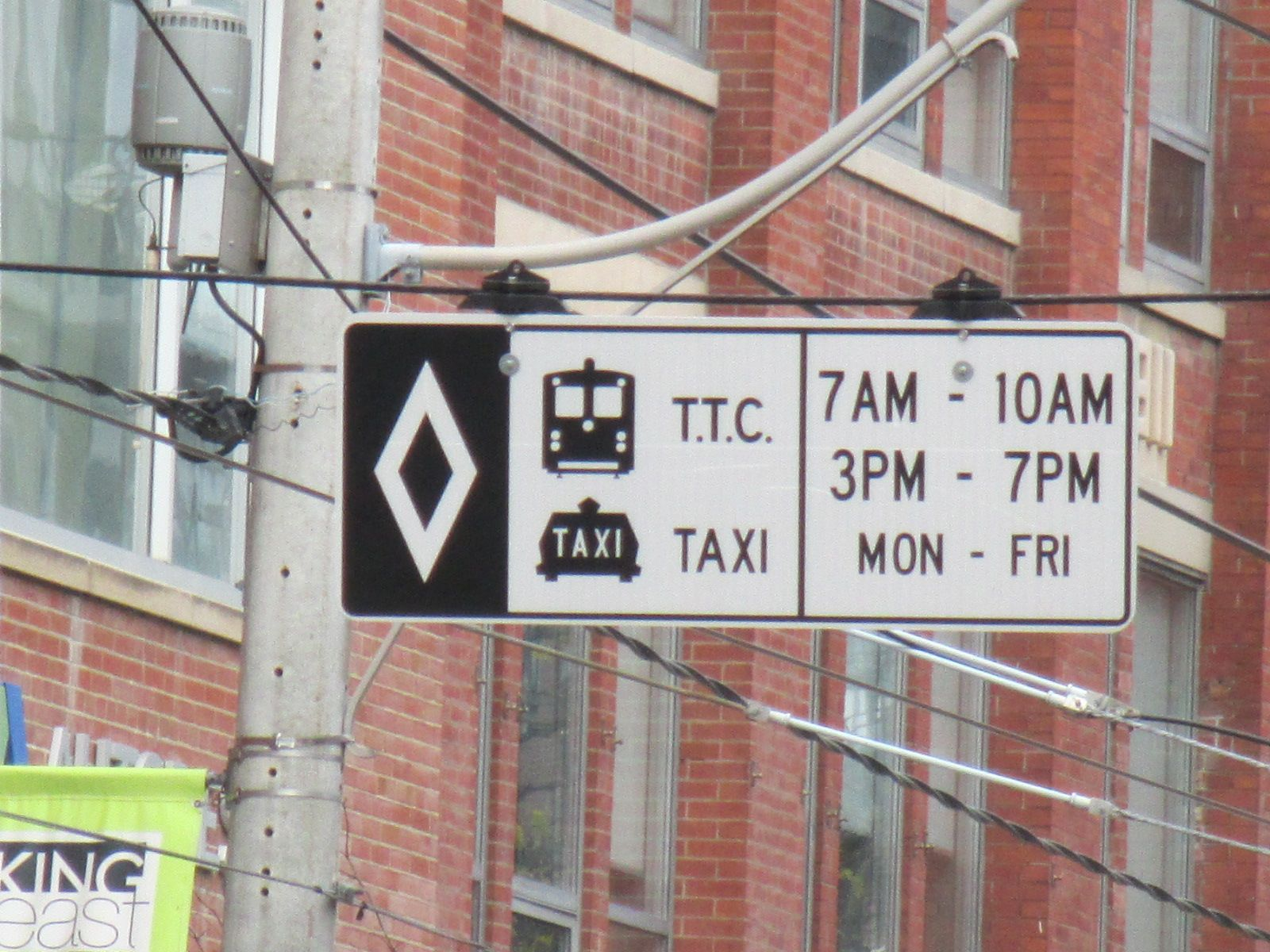
Signs indicating streetcar lanes are only for TTC vehicles and taxis during the rush hours

In 1993, the streetcar tracks along King Street between Dufferin and Parliament Streets were made reserved lanes for streetcars and taxis only during rush hours. Other road traffic was to use the curb lanes during rush hours when parking and stopping would be prohibited. This effort to improve rush-hour streetcar service failed as there was insufficient police enforcement to prevent illegal parking, resulting in motorists continuing to drive on the tracks.

On March 22, 2007, the TTC proposed a pilot project for a transit mall along King Street, to be implemented in mid-2008. The proposal suggested reserving the centre lanes for streetcars and making a single lane in one direction available to private vehicles, taxis and delivery vehicles, alternating the lane direction on different blocks. The street would have been closed entirely to through traffic and streetcars would run at grade, not in a raised median. This arrangement could eventually have led to the trial implementation of a transit mall on King between Bay Street and Spadina Avenue, with hopes of eventually closing King to cars from Dufferin Street to Parliament Street. Local merchants and restaurateurs opposed the proposed transit mall.

=== King Street Pilot Project ===
While the 2007 pilot project was not implemented, proposals for some kind of transit priority corridor were revived in 2016 when the City of Toronto's "King Street Visioning Study" proposed a transit and pedestrian corridor on King Street through downtown.

In February 2017, as part of the King Street Pilot Study, City staff proposed three options, one of which would be submitted to City Council for approval in July and implementation as a pilot in the fourth quarter of 2017. One of the three options was similar to the 2007 proposal. All three options forbade left turns, and two options forced automobile traffic to leave King Street by a right turn after travelling only one block. All three options aimed to reduce automobile interference with streetcar operation between Bathurst Street in the west and either Parliament Street or Jarvis Street in the east.

On July 6, 2017, Toronto City Council—by a vote of 34 to 4—approved a one-year, $1.5-million pilot project to improve streetcar service along King Street between Bathurst and Jarvis Streets. The project would limit automobiles to travel only one block before being forced to turn right, and left turns would be prohibited. However, over the objections of the TTC, Council granted taxi cabs an exemption on the ban against through traffic between 10pm and 5am. The TTC said that King Street is busy overnight, forcing streetcars to slow down to between 4.6 and 6.8 kilometres per hour (2.9 and 4.2 mph).

On October 23, 2017, the City of Toronto published a plan for the King Street Transit Pilot showing the location of streetcar stops and traffic restrictions between Bathurst and Jarvis Streets. The pilot project went into operation on November 12, 2017, and was expected to last one year. The following changes were made for the pilot:

- Painted road lines and Jersey barriers were used to indicate lane restrictions.
- Traffic signals and signage were modified to indicate turn restrictions.
- Most streetcar stops were moved to the far-side. However, during the pilot phase, existing near-side transit shelters were not moved.
- At Transit Control, the TTC assigned a dedicated manager to monitor 504 King and 514 Cherry streetcars along King Street.

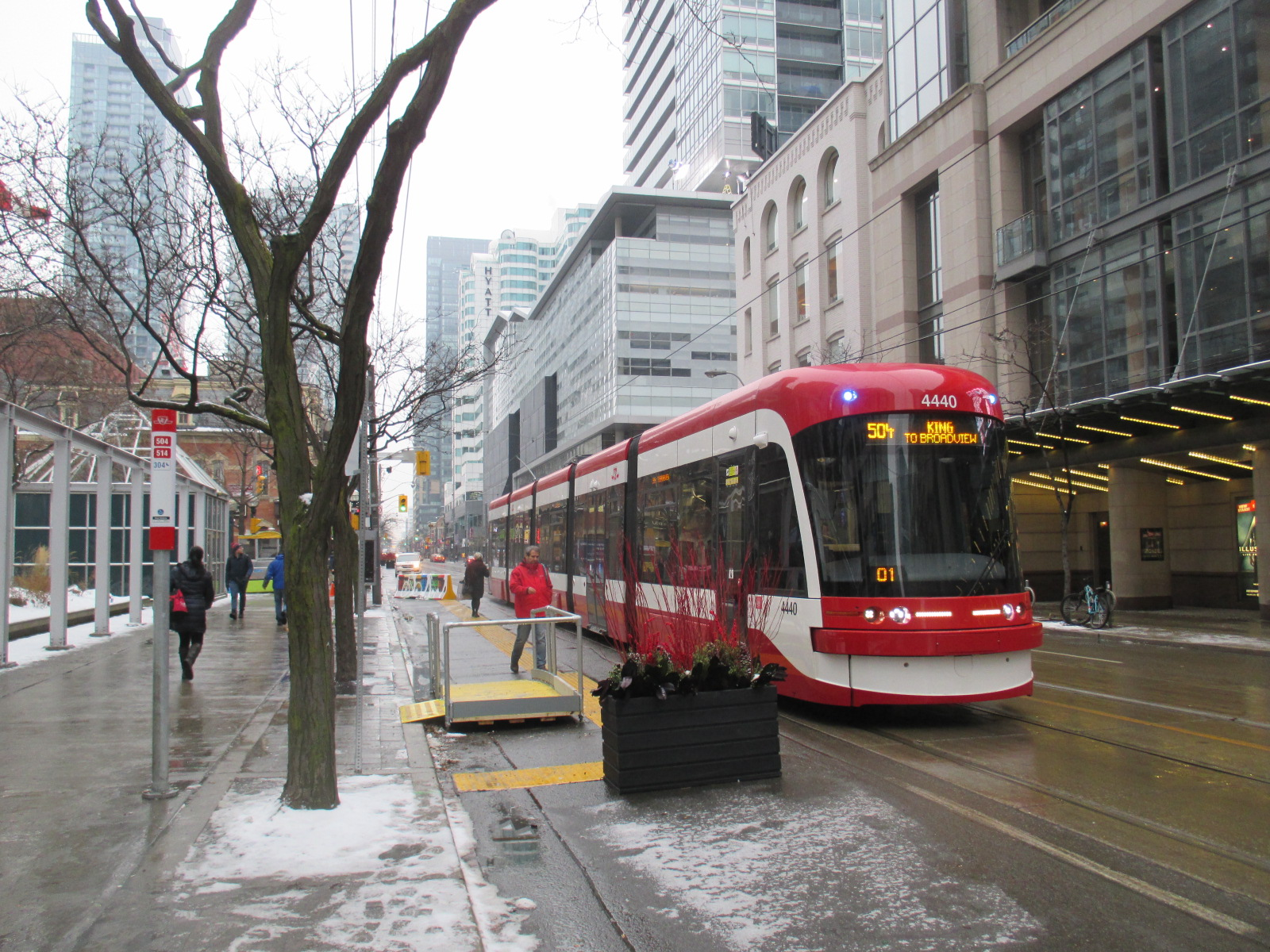
Temporary far-side stop erected for the King Street Pilot Project

After 16 days of operation, University of Toronto (U of T) researchers determined that the transit mall had reduced the mean travel time for streetcars by 24% westbound (from 22.8 to 17.3 minutes) and 20% eastbound (from 20.6 to 16.4 minutes) during the evening rush hour. Only 1.3% of streetcars took more than 25 minutes to travel between Jarvis and Bathurst Streets during the evening rush hour versus 19% prior to the pilot. However, crowding on routes 504 and 514 had increased, forcing riders to wait for room to board as several streetcars passed; improved travel times increased demand for streetcar service through the transit mall. To address the increased demand, the TTC started to assign two Flexity streetcars, plus future Flexity deliveries from Bombardier, to route 504. This was in addition to the 10 Flexity streetcars on route 514 and 44 CLRVs on route 504. The City's Transportation Services department had yet to adjust traffic light timings to give more green-light time for streetcars within the transit mall.

By December 12, 2017, City staff reported that the transit mall had reduced streetcar travel time during the morning rush hours from 15.3 to 14.9 minutes eastbound and from 15.2 to 14.3 minutes westbound. During the evening rush hours, travel time was reduced from 18.9 to 17.6 minutes eastbound and 19 minutes to 16.4 minutes westbound. The mall allowed better spacing of streetcars, reducing the problem of streetcar bunching. The mall had little impact on traffic on neighbouring streets. Statistics differed between the U of T analysis and the City's because different pre-pilot periods were selected and because the U of T study had collected data for a shorter period. At the time of the City's analysis, traffic signal timing had not yet been changed to improve streetcar speeds.

By mid-January 2018, the TTC had released its own analysis, which found that morning rush hour ridership had increased 25% along King Street after implementation of the transit mall and that the average travel time through the transit mall (Bathurst Street to Jarvis Street) had decreased by 14%. The TTC temporarily replaced streetcars on routes 505 Dundas and 506 Carlton with buses and reassigned those streetcars to other routes, such as 504 King, to handle crowding from increased ridership.

The Ontario Restaurant Hotel and Motel Association reported that 26 restaurants located within the King Street theatre district saw revenue drop by 41% (comparing December 2016 with December 2017). Restaurateurs attributed the declining revenue to driving restrictions and the removal of on-street parking within the corridor. The City started a campaign to attract customers to local businesses along the mall, such as a public space design competition, street performers, warming stations and special promotions. In January 2018, to attract automobile customers, the City offered up to $10 in free parking at municipal parking lots in the area.

By May and June 2018, streetcar ridership along King Street had increased overall by 11% since the King Street Pilot Project had started. Ridership had increased 35% in the morning rush hours and 27% during the evening rush hours. Average travel time at midday was reduced by 2 minutes and by 4 to 5 minutes during the afternoon. 85% of streetcars operated on a headway of 4 minutes. The City found that retail business in the area had increased by 0.3%, although some restaurateurs in the John Street area still complained of lost business due to the pilot.

In early July 2018, the City activated transit signal priority (TSP) along the transit mall. With this improvement, streetcar travel time along the mall was reduced on average by 30 to 126 seconds depending on direction; the change particularly benefitted eastbound streetcars during the evening rush hours. TSP reduced the chances of a streetcar being stopped at a red light, saving an average of 8 seconds per signaled intersection. A transponder on the streetcar notifies TSP of a streetcar approaching a signaled intersection; TSP could then extend a green light or shorten a red light facing a streetcar.

On December 13, 2018, Toronto City Council voted 19 to 3 in favour of extending the pilot until July 31, 2019. City staff wanted more time to collect and analyze data before recommending whether to make the pilot permanent.

=== Permanent corridor ===
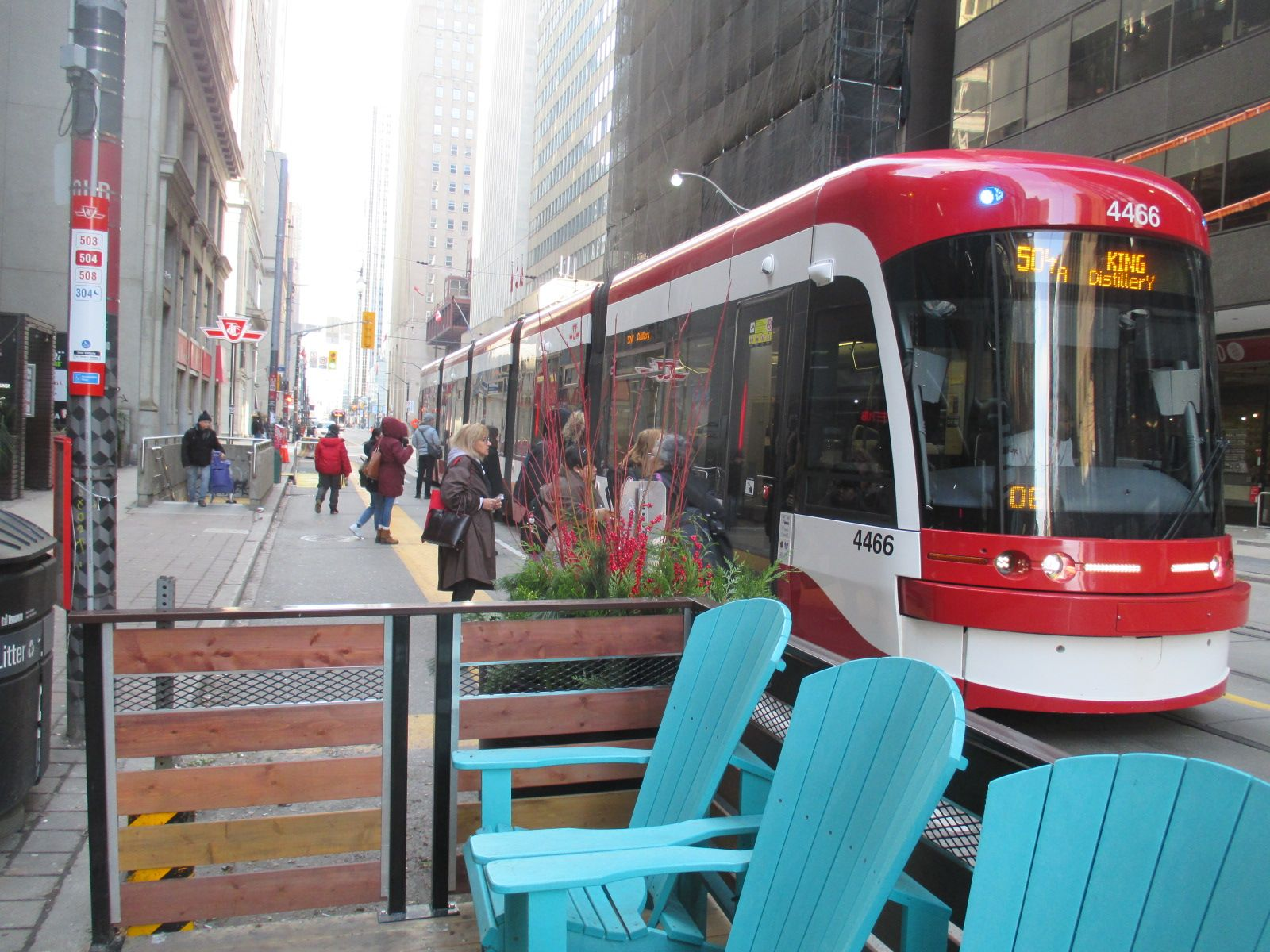
A patio with Muskoka chairs within the transit priority corridor next to an entrance to King station

In April 2019, a City staff report dubbed the transit mall the "King Street Transit Priority Corridor". On April 16, 2019, City Council voted 22 to 3 in favour of making the pilot permanent. From the beginning of the pilot, weekday ridership had increased from 72,000 to 84,000 passengers, while people movement had also increased and vehicle traffic had decreased in the pilot area. City staff were considering adaptations of the pilot to other routes. Other cities were examining the pilot to possibly emulate it. However, City staff reported that growth in retail spending fell from 2.5% the year before the pilot to 1.7% during the project.

In November 2019, new raised streetcar loading platforms were installed at the Portland Street and Peter Street stops for evaluation. Both ends of the platform have a bicycle ramp to allow the platform to double as part of a bicycle path. Cyclists are not allowed to cross the platform when passengers are boarding or alighting a streetcar. When a streetcar is not present, waiting streetcar passengers must stand in a white-coloured area behind a yellow tactile divider to allow cyclists to pass. The new platforms use former road space to make more room for pedestrians.

In September 2021, the Advisory Committee on Accessible Transit advised the TTC that the temporary metal ramps at streetcar stops along the King Street Transit Priority Corridor were in poor condition and had become inaccessible. The proposed solution was to replace the metal ramps with asphalt ramps from the sidewalk to the street, locating the new ramps roughly at the second door of the streetcar. The new ramps would be 2 metres wide and, unlike the old ramps but like curb ramps elsewhere in the city, would not have a handrail.

From November 2017 to August 2019, police issued 16,000 fines to motorists failing to turn off the corridor where through-traffic is prohibited. Each fine cost the driver $110 plus two demerit points. Out-of-town drivers were the main culprits. In December 2022, there were again complaints about motorists illegally continuing through the corridor and of a lack of police enforcement. In January 2023, in a 40-minute period during a late weekday afternoon, a Toronto Star reporter observed 31 vehicles disobeying traffic signage at the intersection of King and Yonge Streets. Suggestions to overcome the problem included using traffic cameras to catch violators (which would require provincial permission), making signs larger, painting red lines on the road and adding curbs to separate road traffic.

By the end of November 2023, streetcar performance had deteriorated along the transit corridor mainly due to construction and a lack of police enforcement of traffic rules. Travel time for the 504 streetcar was on average 23 minutes in September 2017 before the implementation of the corridor, 16 minutes in September 2018 after its implementation and 26 minutes in 2023. Because of various construction projects, downtown streets were more congested, and motorists were using the transit corridor in violation of traffic restrictions. In addition, there was congestion at intersections crossing King Street, which could delay streetcar traffic. A University of Toronto study showed there were 6,800 illegal turns or through movements per day, but less than 0.3 percent of the offending drivers were ticketed. (Ironically, police ticketed a streetcar driver for failing to clear the York Street intersection and thus blocking southbound traffic.)

On December 8, 2023, Mayor Olivia Chow announced that the city was fixing the problem of illegal traffic along the corridor. There will initially be 10 traffic agents along King Street, to be expanded to 50 agents. Construction along parallel Adelaide Street would end by late December, providing more room there for road traffic. Chow hoped that the province would allow cameras for automatic enforcement of traffic restrictions. Chow also wanted improved signage for motorists along the corridor.

By February 2024, there were up to 12 traffic agents long the corridor between 5 and 6 p.m. weekdays. When the agents were on duty, streetcar travel times were reduced from 45–65 minutes to 17–21 minutes, and agents prevented the blocking of intersections 96 percent of the time. However, streetcar travel times increased after the agents went off duty. Chow hopes to have 40 agents available by March 2024 to extend their hours of traffic supervision.

== Adoption abroad ==
The corridor inspired New York City to create a similar corridor for bus rapid transit along 14th Street in Manhattan. Unlike Toronto, New York uses cameras to catch motorists illegally using its corridor.
