= Queen line =

Queen line may refer to:

- Queen subway line, a previously proposed rapid transit line in Toronto, Ontario but which was never built
- collectively, the streetcar lines serving Queen Street (Toronto):
  - 501 Queen
  - 502 Downtowner
  - 503 Kingston Road
- Relief Line (Toronto), a currently proposed rapid transit line that would run along Queen Street
