= 502 Downtowner =

Former streetcar route in Toronto, Canada

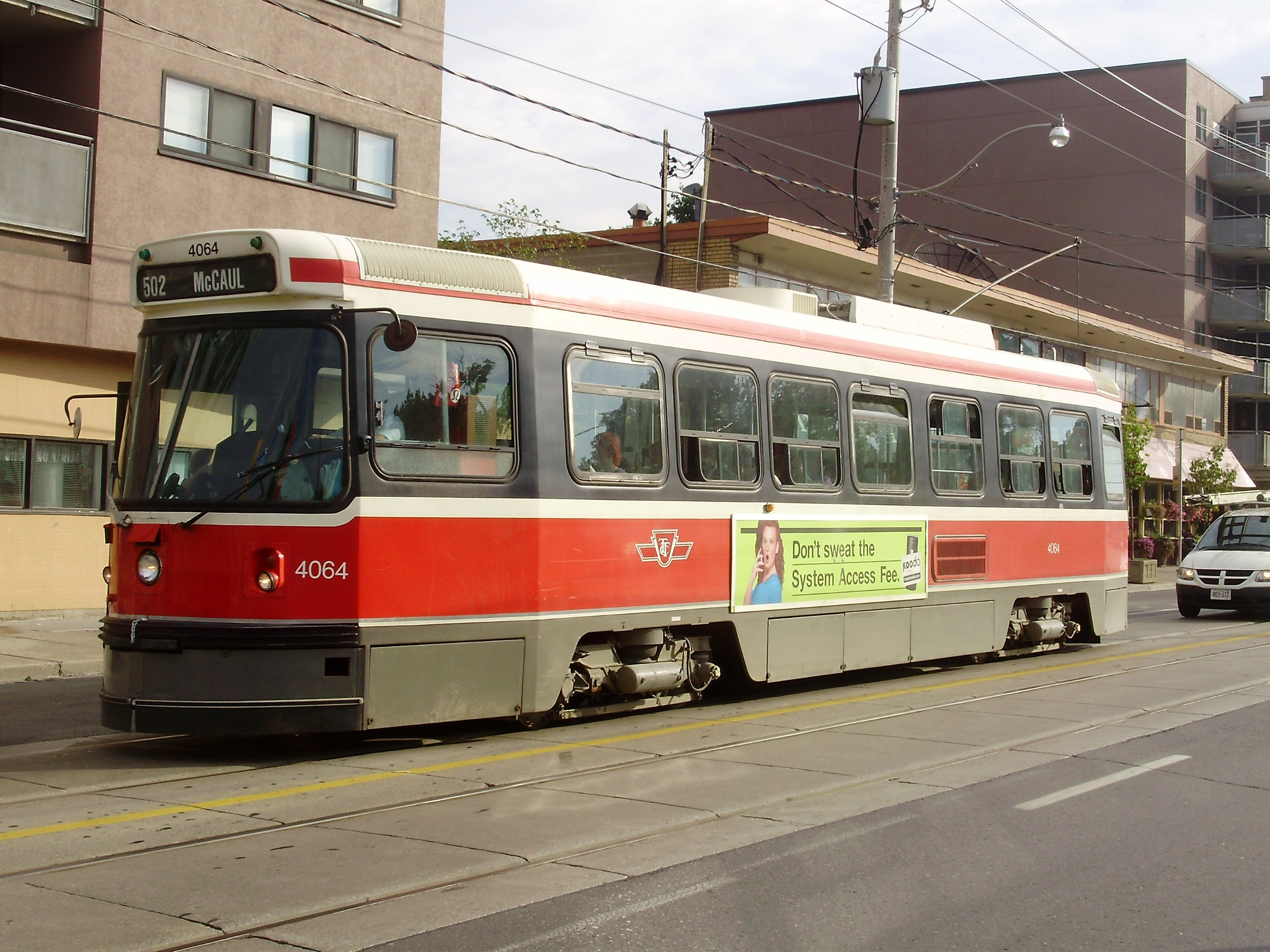
- 502 Downtowner streetcar on Kingston Road

Overview
- Status: Discontinued
- Locale: Toronto, Ontario
- Termini: McCaul Loop (west); Bingham Loop (east)
- Stations: Osgoode; Queen

Service
- Type: Streetcar route
- Route number: 502
- Operator(s): Toronto Transit Commission
- Depot(s): Birchmount
- Rolling stock: Temporary replacement bus service

Technical
- Line length: 9.38 km (5.83 mi)
- Track gauge: 4 ft 10 7/8 in (1,495 mm)
- Electrification: 600 V DC overhead

The 502 Downtowner was a streetcar route operated by the Toronto Transit Commission in Toronto, Ontario, Canada. It ran from the Bingham Loop at Victoria Park Avenue and Kingston Road in the Beaches neighbourhood to McCaul Loop in downtown Toronto. Starting in September 2019, all streetcar services along Kingston Road were consolidated into the 503 Kingston Rd route.

== Route ==
The 502 Downtowner ran southwest on Kingston Road then turned west along Queen Street. It went along Queen to McCaul Street where there is a turning loop just north of Queen Street West. The route was grouped together with the 503 Kingston Rd for accounting purposes, as they shared a large amount of the same track.

The 502 Downtowner ran during the day from Monday to Friday only, overlapping rush-hour service provided by weekday 503 Kingston Rd streetcars, both covering much of the same route. Evening, weekend and holiday service is provided by the 22A Coxwell bus route replacing streetcar service along Kingston Road. The section to the west of Queen and Coxwell is served by the 501 Queen and 504 King streetcars. Both of these routes have all day services.

== History ==
A streetcar route along Kingston Road and Queen Street between Victoria Park Avenue and McCaul Street has existed under various route names and with some variations in routing since about 1930, according to TTC system maps and ride guides.

By 1930, the Queen streetcar route (not the same as today's 501 Queen) ran from the Birchmount Loop to the McCaul Loop. A 1930 system map indicates that some streetcars turned back at the Bingham Loop, while an extra fare was required to go beyond Victoria Park Avenue to the Birchmount Loop.

By September 1938, the route from the Birchmount Loop to the McCaul Loop had by then been renamed from "Queen" to "Kingston Rd" (not the same as today's 503 Kingston Rd). Despite the name change, there was no change in routing.

On July 1, 1954, the Birchmount Loop was abandoned and the Bingham Loop became the eastern terminal of the Kingston Rd route. Thus, in 1954, the Kingston Rd route became identical to the present-day 502 Downtowner route.

Prior to 1966, the Coxwell streetcar provided evening, weekend and holiday service on Kingston Road. There was an off-hour extension of the Coxwell route from Coxwell Avenue and Queen Street to the Bingham Loop. In 1966, with the opening of Line 2 Bloor–Danforth, the 22 Coxwell bus replaced the Coxwell streetcar to service Kingston Road to the Bingham Loop in the off-hours.

By May 11, 1968, a new rush-hour route, called the Kingston Rd Tripper, was created running from the Bingham Loop to King and York streets. This tripper route would become today's 503 Kingston Rd route. "Tripper" here means a rush-hour variant of a base route which in this case was the Kingston Rd route (today's 502 Downtowner) to the McCaul Loop.

On April 2, 1973, the new Downtowner streetcar route replaced the Kingston Rd route (not the same route as today's 503 Kingston Rd). However, Downtowner initially did not terminate at McCaul Street, but continued further west to Bathurst Street then north to terminate at Bathurst station. The eastern terminal of the route remained the Bingham Loop. On September 4, 1974, the route west of McCaul Street became rush-hour only. Then, on March 9, 1984, all streetcars on the Downtowner route terminated at the McCaul Loop thus permanently eliminating the branch to Bathurst station. Thus, in 1984, the Downtowner route became identical to the 1954–1973 Kingston Rd route and today's 502 Downtowner route. Also, the Kingston Rd Tripper became known simply as the "Kingston Rd" (today's 503 Kingston Rd).

Around early 1978, the TTC announced plans to number all of its streetcar routes (which had been known only by names), and the Downtowner route was to be number 502. The route number 502 began being displayed on streetcars' destination signs on February 4, 1980, when the Downtowner route was still operated entirely by PCC streetcars.

Beginning October 11, 2016, the 502 Downtowner route had been operated by buses due to a shortage of streetcars resulting from the late delivery of the new Bombardier Flexity Outlook streetcars. Effective June 25, 2018, the route reverted to streetcar operation. However, effective September 2, 2018, the route reverted to bus replacement due to the ongoing streetcar shortage.

On February 20, 2018, the 502 Downtowner and 503 Kingston Rd routes reversed roles. Prior to that date, route 502 provided base, workday service supplemented by route 503 in the rush hours. Since that date, route 503 provides base service while route 502 provides rush-hour only service. However, effective September 2, 2018, these changes were reverted to what was in effect prior to February 20, 2018.

From September 2, 2018, until early September 2019, the 502 Downtowner temporarily operated with replacement buses due to an ongoing streetcar shortage. Due to construction projects between early September and November 2019, the 502 Downtowner service was suspended and replaced with the 503 Kingston Road service. After construction ended in November 2019, the TTC continued to consolidate all Kingston Road service into route 503 "on a trial basis". By January 2020, the TTC had delisted the 502 Downtowner route on its customer website.

== Sites along the line ==
From east to west:

- Upper Beaches
- Leslieville
- South Riverdale
- Moss Park and Moss Park Armoury
- St. Michael's Hospital
- Eaton Centre
- Old City Hall
- Toronto City Hall and Nathan Phillips Square
- Osgoode Hall
- Four Seasons Centre
- Ontario College of Art & Design
