= King station (Toronto) =

Toronto subway station

King
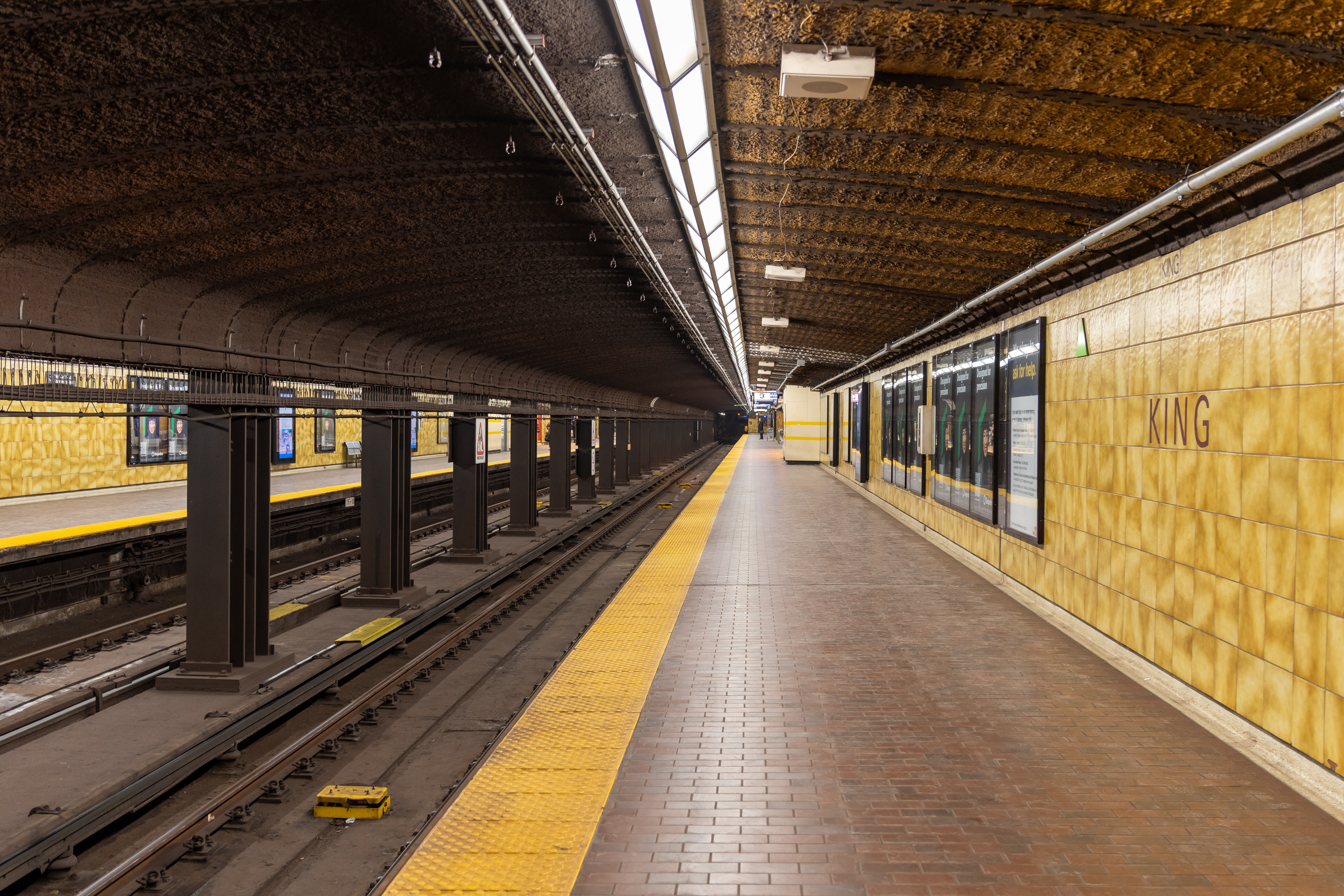

General information
- Location: 3 King Street East, Toronto, Ontario; Canada
- Coordinates: 43°38′56″N 79°22′40″W
- Owner: Toronto Transit Commission
- Platforms: Side platforms
- Tracks: 2
- Connections: TTC buses and Streetcars: 97 Yonge; 304 King; 320 Yonge; 501 Queen; 503 Kingston Rd; 504 King; 508 Lake Shore

Construction
- Structure type: Underground
- Accessible: No

Other information
- Website: Official station page

History
- Opened: March 30, 1954; 72 years ago

Passengers
- 2023–2024: 35,107
- Rank: 13 of 70

Services
Preceding station	Toronto Transit Commission	Following station
Union towards Vaughan	Line 1 Yonge–University	Queen towards Finch
Location

King is a subway station on Line 1 Yonge–University of the Toronto subway system. The station is located at the intersection of King Street and Yonge Street in Toronto's Financial District.

== History ==
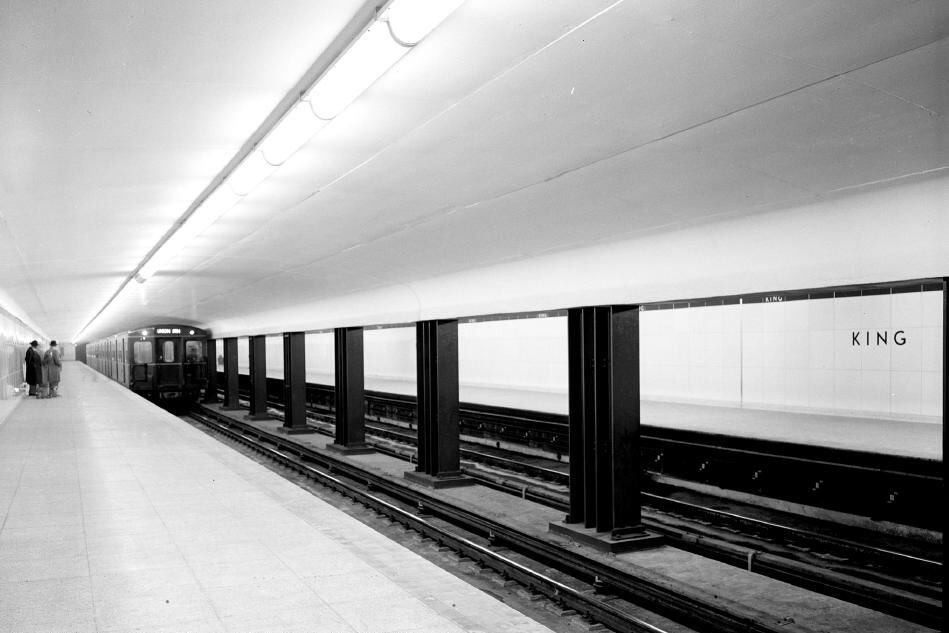
Interior of the station on opening

King station opened in 1954 as part of the first stretch of subway line built in Toronto, between Union and Eglinton stations.

The original address for the station was 70 Yonge Street, which is still used in Toronto Transit Commission (TTC) maps, but the official website uses the address 3 King Street East, which both point to the intersection of the two streets, and the numbers are not used by nearby buildings.

A scissors crossover was installed just north of the station when the line was built, so that trains could easily crossover from one track to another, but was later removed in May 1984 during track rehabilitation because of maintenance costs. In 2012, the TTC decided to restore this crossover, as it would allow trains to turn back during service disruptions after the implementation of automatic train control, which occurred on February 24, 2020.

== Station description ==
The station lies underneath Yonge Street at King Street, and is built on three levels. All five entrances are located on ground level, with three of them being sidewalk staircases from the northeast, southwest, and southeast corners of the Yonge Street and King Street intersection. The northwest corner entrance is through Scotia Plaza, and a semi-automatic entrance from Commerce Court East at 21 Melinda Street is staffed by a collector during rush hour. There is also an "exit only" sidewalk staircase from the southbound subway platform, just south of Melinda Street. There are no elevators in this station, and it is not accessible for persons with physical disabilities.

Below ground level are two separate concourses, located under King Street (north concourse), and under Commerce Court (south concourse). All entrances and exits connect to the north concourse except for ones along Melinda Street. Below the concourses are the subway platforms, connected by stairs and one escalator to the northbound platform on weekdays from 3:00 pm to 6:30 pm.

Gateway Newsstands located in the north concourse is the only tenant in the station.

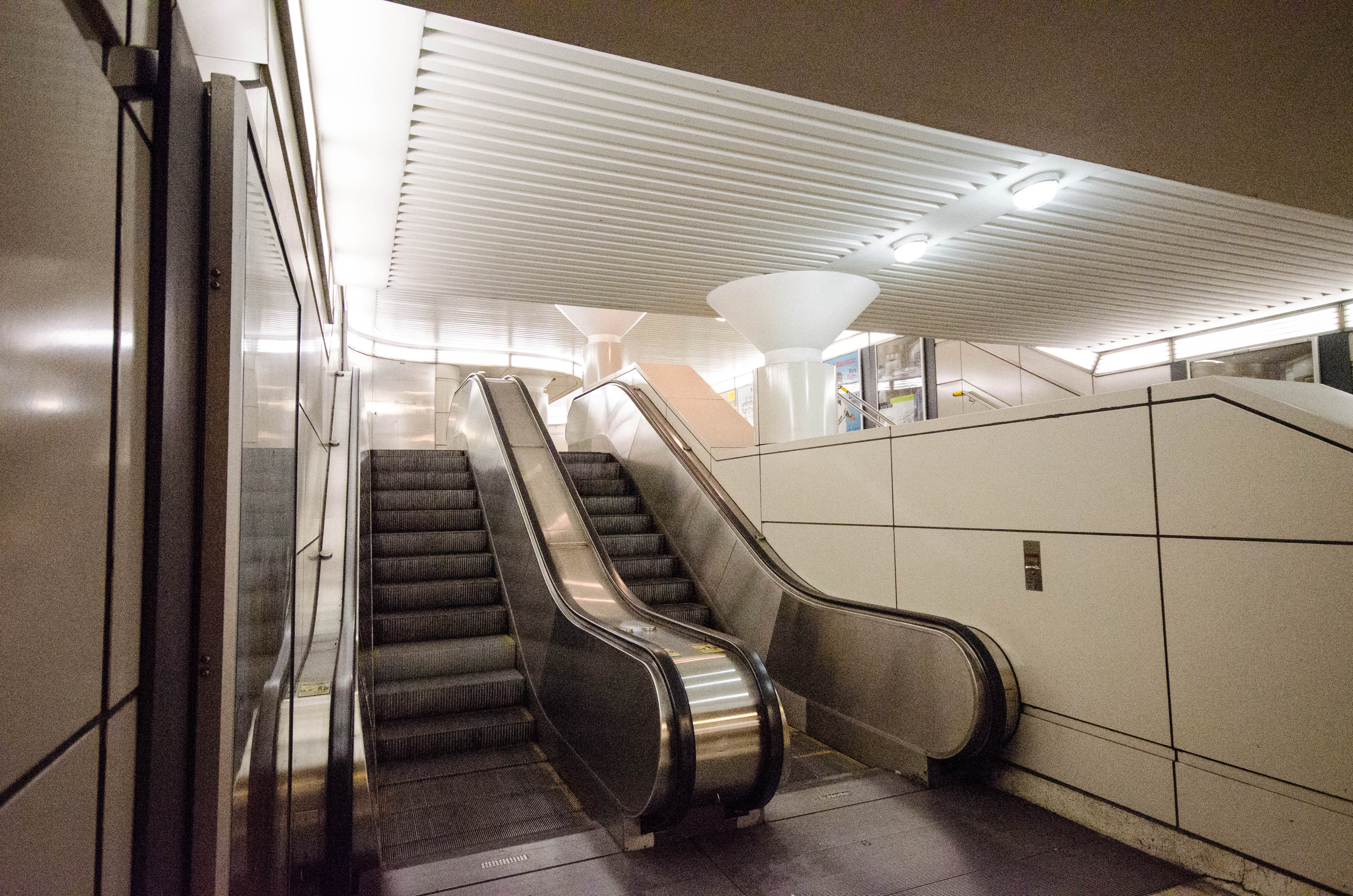
Escalators to Scotia Plaza and Path

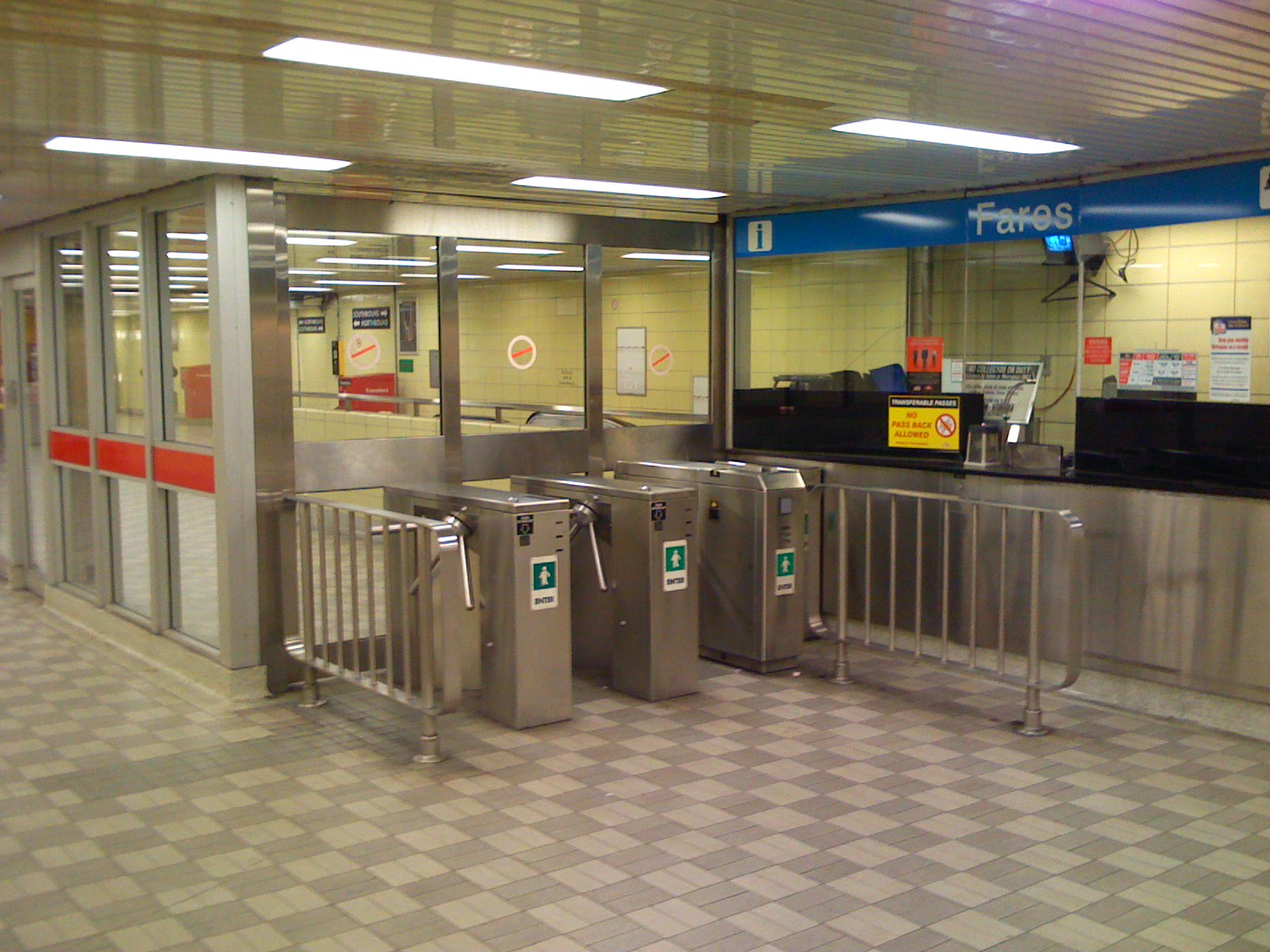
Commerce Court / Melinda Street automatic entrance

== Station improvements ==
As part of its Public Art Program announced in June 2017, the TTC intends to install an artwork titled Light Canopy by artist Sean Martindale. The work is an animated lighting system to be set into the ceiling above the stairwell at King station's western entrance, and will give passers-by the feeling of passing under tree foliage.

In January 2023, the TTC began construction to add elevators to the side platforms, with a new exit to be built at Melinda Street and a second at Yonge and Colborne Streets. The elevators will connect the north- and southbound platforms to the street level concourse. Construction is scheduled to be completed by mid-2026.

== Subway infrastructure in the vicinity ==
North of the station, the subway travels through a scissors crossover through its tunnels underneath Yonge Street, past Queen Street, and into Queen station. South of the station, the subway continues underneath Yonge Street, until it reaches Front Street, where it turns 90 degrees west and passes through a crossover into Union station.

== Nearby destinations ==
The destination for many people using King station is the financial district and its numerous office towers, connected to the station by the underground PATH system of pedestrian tunnels. These include the Canadian Pacific Building, Scotia Plaza, Commerce Court, Toronto-Dominion Centre and First Canadian Place.

This is also the closest station to One Yonge Street, the King Edward Hotel, St. James Cathedral, Toronto Sculpture Garden, St. Lawrence Hall and the St. Lawrence Market.

== Surface connections ==
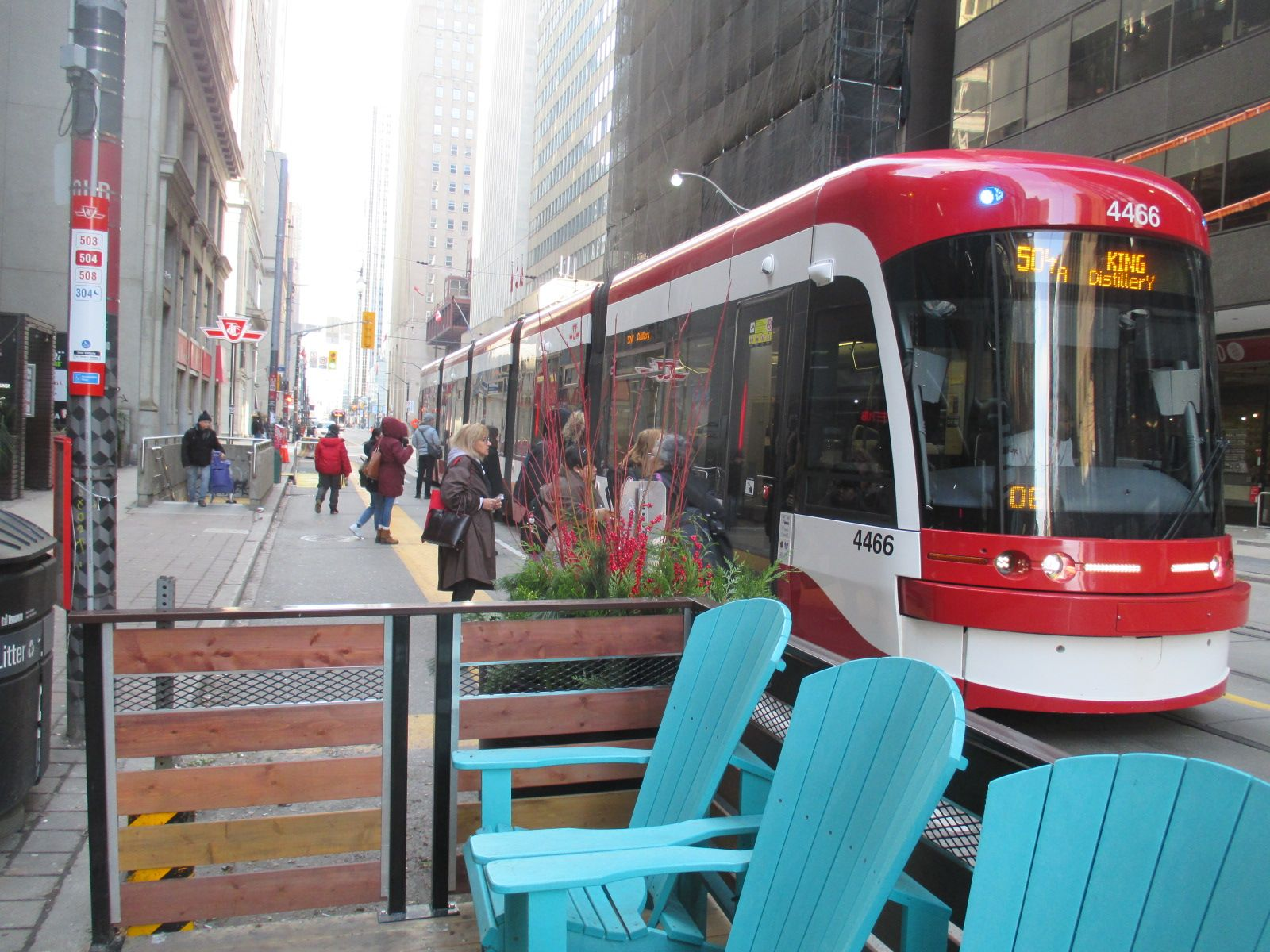
Passengers connect between the streetcar and King station by the staircase (left, rear)

A transfer is required to connect between the subway system and these surface routes:

TTC routes serving the station include:

Route	Name	Additional information
97C	Yonge	Northbound to Eglinton station and southbound to Union station (Rush hour service)
304	King	Streetcar; Blue Night service; eastbound to Broadview station and westbound to Dundas West station
320	Yonge	Blue Night service; northbound to Steeles Avenue and southbound to Queens Quay
503	Kingston Road	Streetcar; eastbound to Victoria Park Avenue from York Street and westbound – on Wellington Street – to King Street and York Street
504A	King	Streetcar; westbound to Dundas West station and eastbound to Distillery Loop
504B	King	Streetcar; eastbound to Broadview station and westbound to Dufferin Gate Loop
508	Lake Shore	Streetcar; rush-hour service only; eastbound to Broadview station and westbound to Long Branch Loop
