= Toronto and Scarboro' Electric Railway, Light and Power Company =

Former railcar company in Toronto

T&YRR Scarboro Division
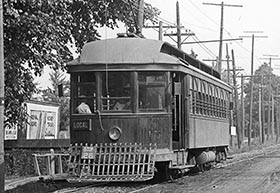

Overview
- Headquarters: Toronto
- Locale: Toronto
- Dates of operation: 1893–1936

Technical
- Track gauge: 4 ft 10 7/8 in (1,495 mm) Toronto gauge
- Length: 8.35 mi (13.44 km) Kingston Rd from Victoria Pk Ave(1913-1922)

Toronto and Scarboro' Electric Railway, Light and Power Company was established in August 1892 to provide street railway service to the Upper Beaches district within the City of Toronto, Ontario and to the neighbouring Township of Scarborough. Except for two branches, the line ran as a radial along Kingston Road.

In 1904, the TSERLPC became the Scarboro Division of the Toronto and York Radial Railway, a subsidiary of the Toronto Railway Company. In 1922, the radial line was acquired by the City of Toronto which contracted the Hydro-Electric Power Commission of Ontario operate the line as the Hydro-Electric Railways: Toronto and York Division. After 1927, the radial service was operated by the Toronto Transportation Commission but with city streetcar service being extended to the Birchmount Loop. Beyond Birchmount, radial service ceased by 1936.

This article is more about the Scarboro radial than about the company that originally created it.

== Timeline ==
=== Pre-T&YRR era (1885-1904) ===
Events prior to the merger creating the T&YRR in 1904

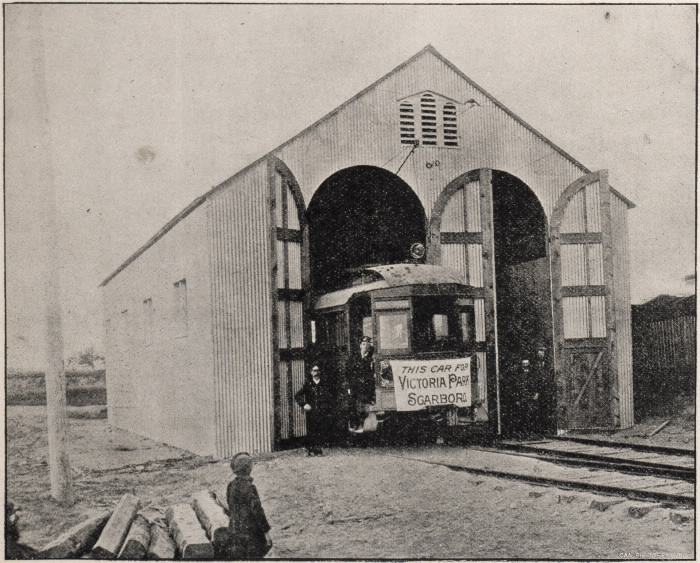
First carbarn on Kingston Road near Walter Street, 1894

On August 18, 1892 the Toronto and Scarboro' Electric Railway, Light and Power Company was incorporated to provide electric streetcar service along Kingston Road, and to produce and sell electricity to customers in the vicinity. Henry Pellatt (of Casa Loma fame) was the chairman of the board of directors.

On July 1, 1893, the Toronto and Scarboro' Electric Railway, Light and Power Company started electric, radial operations with a route on the north side of Kingston Road from Queen Street to Blantyre Avenue.

In early July 1893, the railway created a branch for summer service on the west side of Blantyre Avenue south to Victoria Park, a lakeside recreation area roughly at the location of today's R.C. Harris Water Treatment Plant.

In 1894, the railway opened a branch running from Kingston Road and Walter Street north via Lyall Avenue and Kimberley Street to Gerrard and Main Streets in the then Village of East York.

On March 6, 1895, the Toronto Railway Company acquired controlling interest in the Toronto and Scarboro' Electric Railway, Light and Power Company. The Scarboro line's carhouse at Walter Avenue was closed, and operations were moved to the TRC's King Carhouse at King Street East and St. Lawrence Street.

During the winters of 1895 and 1896, the Blantyre branch did not operate and all radial cars proceeded to East York at Gerrard and Main streets.

In 1897, the railway ripped up its track on Blantyre Avenue and relaid them along Kingston Road to Toronto Hunt Club near Warden Avenue. Winter service was provided to Warden Avenue. Normally, two cars operated every 30 minutes, one to East York and the other to Warden Avenue.

On July 12, 1901, service was expanded 1.7 kilometres (1.1 mi) along Kingston Road from Warden Avenue to Half Way House at Midland Avenue. The expansion was triggered by threats by township to cancel the railway's franchise. The railway was reluctant to expand as Scarborough then was very rural with only a small population. Sunday service started on September 22, 1901.

=== Mackenzie & Mann era (1904-1921) ===
Events when the T&YRR was under the control of William Mackenzie and Donald Mann

On August 1, 1904, the Toronto and Scarboro' Electric Railway, Light and Power Company was merged into the Toronto and York Radial Railway becoming its Scarboro Division. The Walter Avenue carhouse was reopened, and operation of the Scarboro line became completely separate from the TRC system.

On January 23, 1905, service reached Mason's near Bellamy Road.

On December 24, 1905, service reached Scarborough Post Office at Markham Road.

On August 31, 1906, service reached West Hill (near today's Fairwood Crescent) where a station was built.

In 1912, the railway opened Scarborough Heights Park (also called Scarborough Park), a 60-acre tract extending from Kingston Road to the lake between Midland Avenue and Bellamy Road.

In 1913, the branch from Kingston Road to Gerrard and Main Streets closed due to competition from the new Gerrard line of the Toronto Civic Railways, which opened on December 18, 1912. Riders found that the Gerrard route was a more direct route to get downtown.

=== Hydro Electric era (1922-1927) ===
Events when the T&YRR was managed by Hydro-Electric Railways

On August 16, 1922, the City of Toronto formally acquired the T&YRR lines. The plan was that the city portions of the T&YRR radial lines would be incorporated into the TTC, and the portions outside the city would be managed by Ontario Hydro as the Hydro-Electric Railways: Toronto and York Division. Thus, the Toronto streetcar system replaced the radial line between Queen Street and Victoria Park Avenue, making the latter street the western terminal of the radial line.

On November 1, 1922, Hydro-Electric Railways took over operation of the T&YRR lines outside of the city limits. Hydro transferred new cars from its Guelph Radial Railway operation, and constructed a new terminus at Kingston Road and Victoria Park Avenue.

On December 2, 1922, the TTC opened the Bingham Loop. City streetcars now replaced the radial cars along Kingston Road from Queen Street to Victoria Park Avenue.

By 1927, there were five standard-gauge cars stored in the Scarboro line's Warden Carhouse that the Hydro-Electric Railways had transferred from the Guelph Radial Railway. These Preston-built "Prairie" type cars were in storage pending a conversion of the line to standard gauge, a conversion that did not happen.

=== TTC era (1927-1936) ===
Events when the TTC operated the T&YRR lines

On January 12, 1927, the Toronto Transportation Commission started operating the T&YRR lines under contract including the Scarboro line. On January 25, the TTC connected Scarboro radial tracks to the city system at the Bingham Loop. On that date, it also closed the Warden Carhouse (just east of Warden Avenue), and transferred operations to the Russell Carhouse under the TTC's Radial Department.

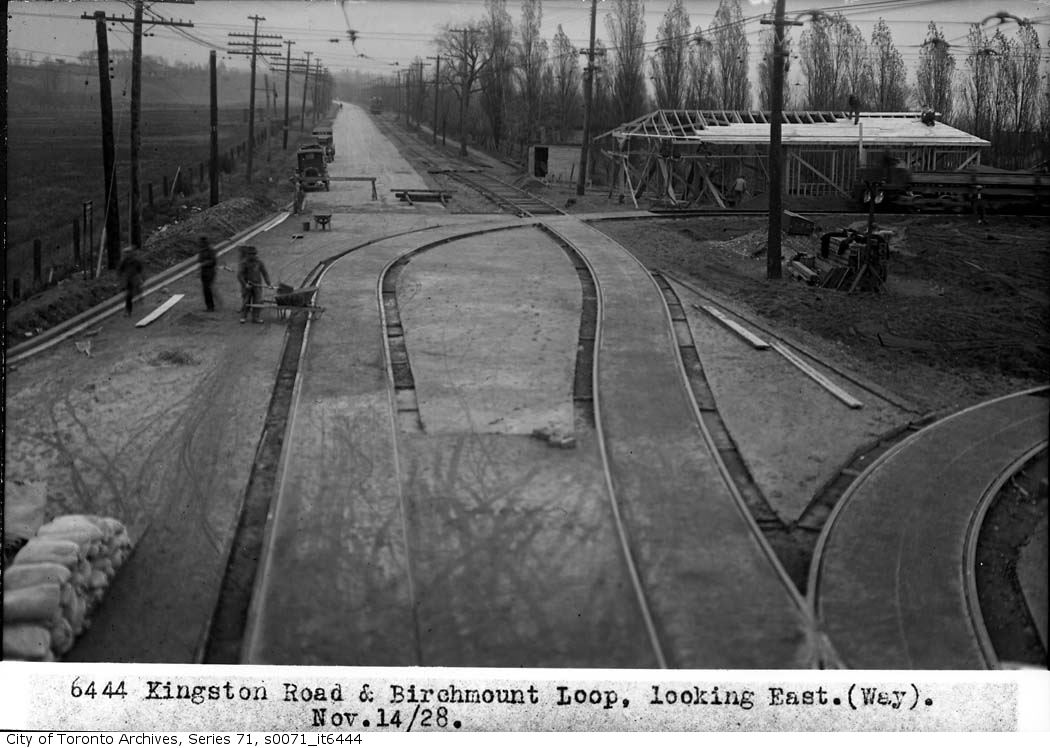
This 1928 image shows the Birchmount Loop under construction with the single track of the Scarboro radial line passing through.

On July 4, 1927, the five standard-gauge cars that had been stored at the Warden Carhouse were put into service on the Scarboro line after regauging and conversion to one-man operation.

On November 18, 1928, the TTC extended the Kingston Road streetcar line with double-track east to a new Birchmount Loop, where radial passengers could now transfer to the city streetcars. At the loop, there was a station-like structure containing a waiting room.

After the 1929 season, Scarborough Heights Park permanently closed.

On July 13, 1930, radial service east of Scarborough Post Office (just beyond Eglinton Avenue) was replaced by Gray Coach bus service.

On June 25, 1936, Scarboro radial service ended being replaced by buses on the next day.

=== Postscript ===
On July 1, 1954, the TTC terminated streetcar service to the Birchmount Loop replacing streetcar service east of Victoria Park Avenue by buses. The introduction of a new fare zone system and a reorganization of the suburban bus network led to the termination of streetcar service east of Victoria Park Avenue.

== Stations ==
=== West Hill ===
When the West Hill station opened in 1906, it featured a waiting room, restaurant, barbershop, reading room and a public telephone. Customers could park their horses here while riding the radial car into Toronto, an early park and ride facility.

=== Victoria Park ===
In 1922, the TTC took over the radial route between Queen Street and Victoria Park and converted it into a double-track streetcar line. The streetcar line ended at the Bingham Loop between Bingham Avenue and Victoria Park Avenue. The Scarboro radial line ended on the east side of Victoria Park Avenue.

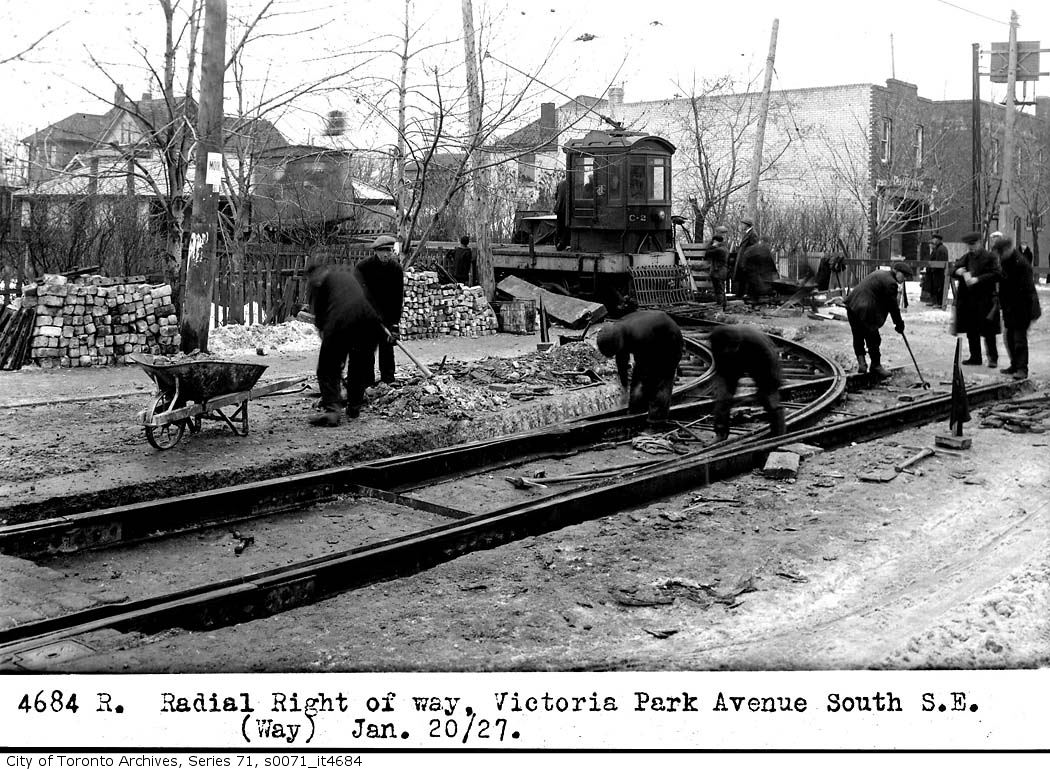
Almost finished Scarboro radial connection to Bingham Loop with crane car C-2 at the new radial terminal.

When the TTC took over operation of the Scarboro radial line in 1927, a new radial terminal was built in two stages. As a temporary measure, the body of old TRC car 370 was used as a curb-side waiting room placed initially at north-west corner of Kingston Road and Victoria Park Avenue and later moved to the north-east corner. Then, the TTC built a new off-street terminal with a waiting room behind the north-east corner. Just before reaching Victoria Park, the radial turned north into an alley then west into another alley behind buildings facing Kingston Road. The TTC then connected this terminal track to the Bingham Loop so that radial cars could pass through it to be stored at Russell Carhouse. Radial cars used Bingham Loop only for carhouse access; radial passengers had to use the radial terminal on the east side of Victoria Park Avenue. When radial cars entered service from Russell Carhouse, they had to go to the north side of Bingham Loop, then reverse into the radial terminal across the street.

Bingham Loop in 1927-1928

When the streetcar extension to Birchmount Avenue was being built along Kingston Road to the new Birchmount Loop, the westbound track was built first, and the radial cars used that track in both directions until the eastbound track was ready.

== Carhouse ==
- Walter Carhouse (1893–1895,1904–?), on north side of Kingston Road near Walter Street
- King Carhouse (1895–1904), operated by the Toronto Railway Company on King Street East at St. Lawrence Street
- Warden Carhouse (?–1927), just east of Warden Avenue on the south side of Kingston Road.
- Russell Carhouse (1927–1936)

== See also ==
- List of Ontario railways
- List of defunct Canadian railways
