= Bingham Loop =

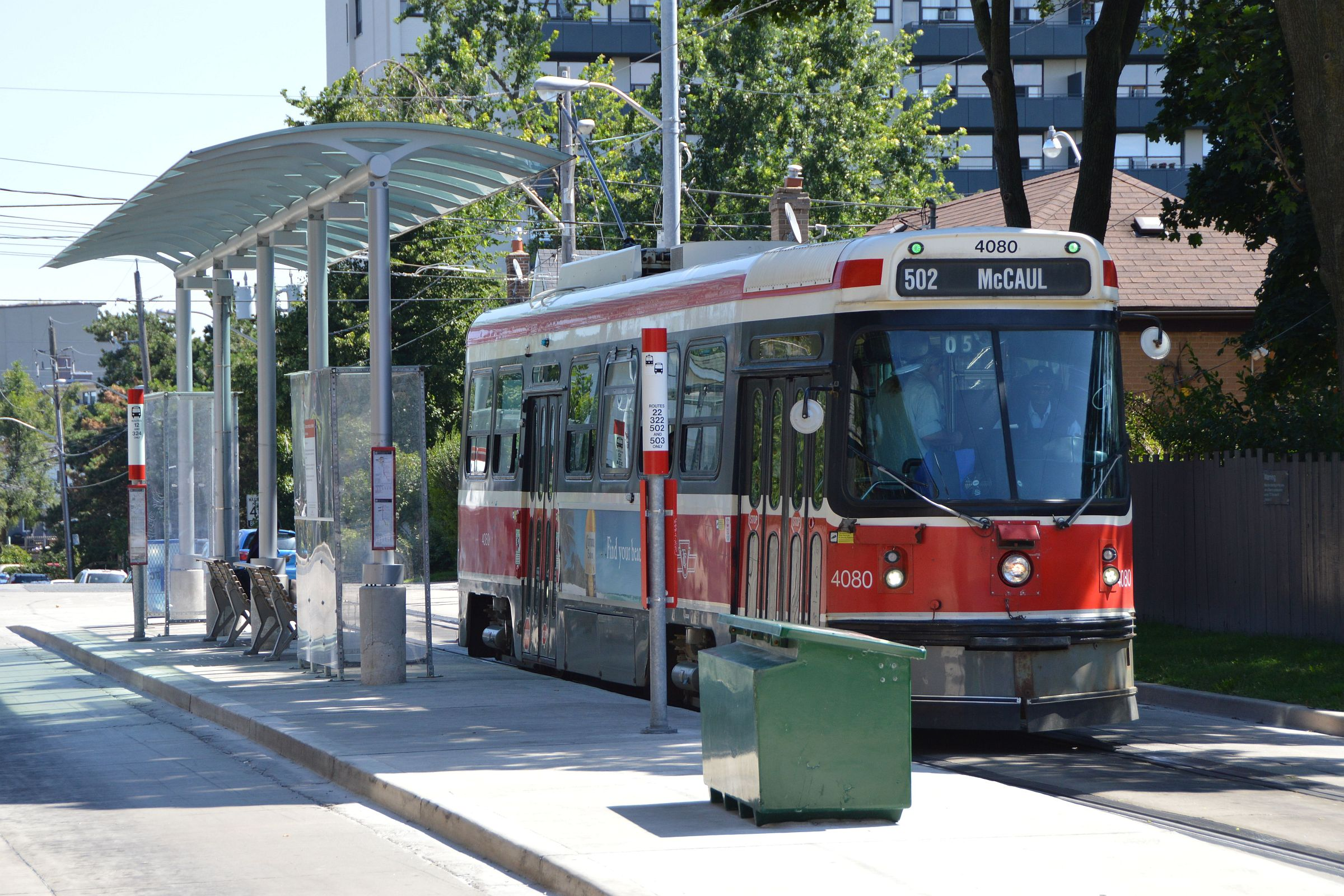

General information
- Location: Victoria Park Avenue / Kingston Road; Toronto, Ontario; Canada
- Coordinates: 43°40′53.5″N 79°17′05″W
- Owner: Toronto Transit Commission
- Connections: TTC buses

History
- Opened: 2 December 1922
- Rebuilt: 1954, 2013
Location

Bingham Loop is a station and turning loop at the eastern terminus of the 503 Kingston Rd streetcar lines of the Toronto Transit Commission (TTC). It lies between Victoria Park Avenue and Bingham Avenue, just north of Kingston Road, in Toronto.

Streetcars loop anticlockwise from Victoria Park Avenue and stop on the south side of the platform, while buses enter in the other direction from Bingham Avenue and stop on the north side. The island platform is covered by a one-piece 15-metre-long (50 ft) canopy. A small brick building provides facilities for TTC staff. Likely as a result of Victoria Park Avenue being a longer and more well-known street than Bingham Avenue, streetcars terminating at the loop display "Victoria Park" on their destination signs, rather than "Bingham".

== History ==
Comparing views looking east along the tracks at the Bingham Loop

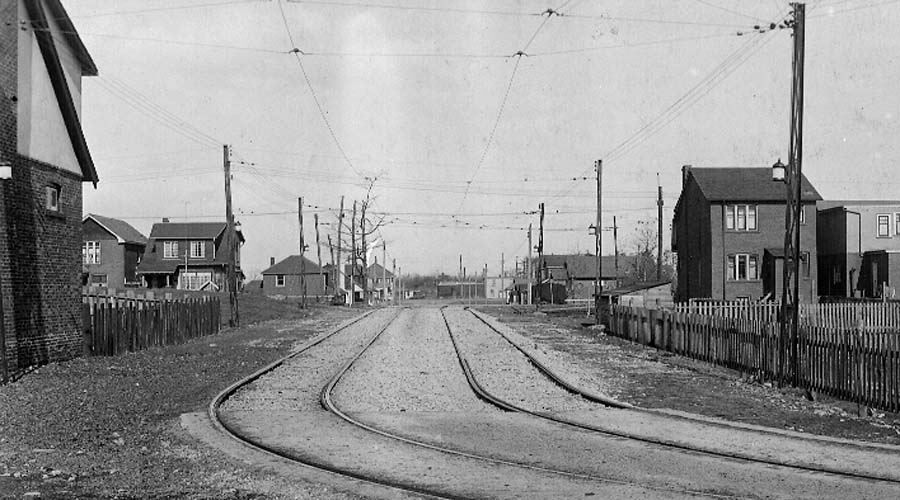
In 1923, soon after being built in 1922

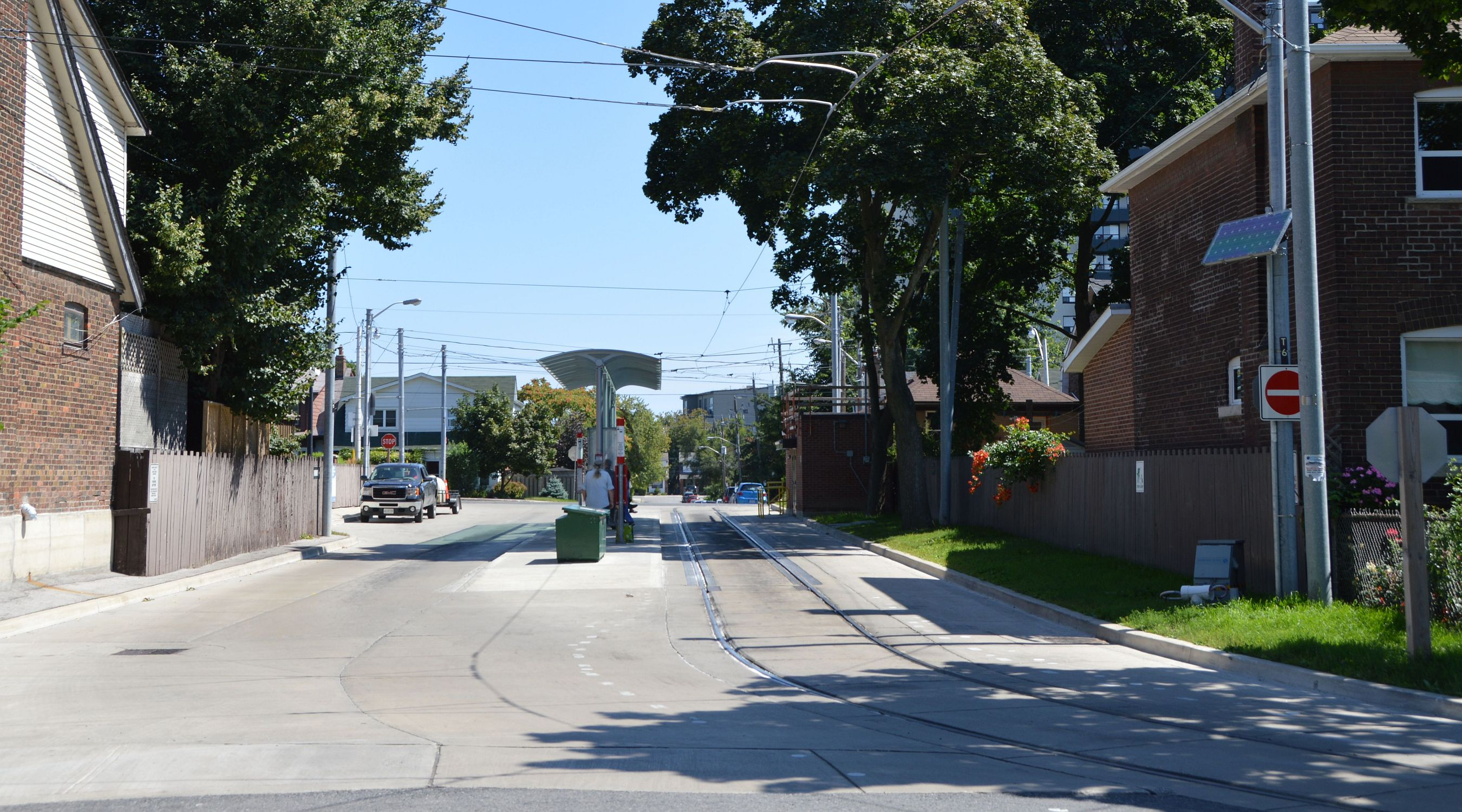
In 2014, soon after the 2013 renovation

The private Toronto and Scarboro' Electric Railway, Light and Power Company had operated the single-track Scarboro radial line along Kingston Road to West Hill. When the TTC assumed the route between Queen Street and Victoria Park in 1922, they double-tracked the line and built the return loop at Bingham. In 1927, the TTC took over operation of the Scarboro radial line, which terminated on the east side of Victoria Park Avenue, and connected it to Bingham Loop so that radial cars could be stored at Russell Carhouse. In 1928, the TTC extended the double track east to Birchmount Loop, replacing the Scarboro radial line to that point. Bingham Loop was rebuilt in 1954, with one track removed to accommodate buses as it is today, and streetcar service east of Victoria Park was discontinued.

The tracks at the loop and along Kingston Road were replaced in 2013. The remnants of the old trackage were removed, including a feature which allowed streetcars exiting from Bingham Avenue to turn east on Kingston Road and re-enter the loop.

== Services ==
- 12 Kingston Rd – westbound to Victoria Park station (stops eastbound on Kingston Road)
- 117 Birchmount South – westbound to Victoria Park station, eastbound to Warden station
- 316 Kingston Rd – McCowan – terminus to Steeles Avenue and McCowan Road via Kingston Road
- 322 Coxwell – terminus via Coxwell station and Cosburn to Broadview station
- 324 Victoria Park – terminus to Steeles Avenue and Warden Avenue
- 503 Kingston Rd – terminus to Dufferin Gate Loop

== See also ==
- Victoria Park terminal, Scarboro radial
