= Birchmount Loop =

Former transit terminal in Scarborough, Ontario

Coordinates: 43°41′35″N 79°15′43″W

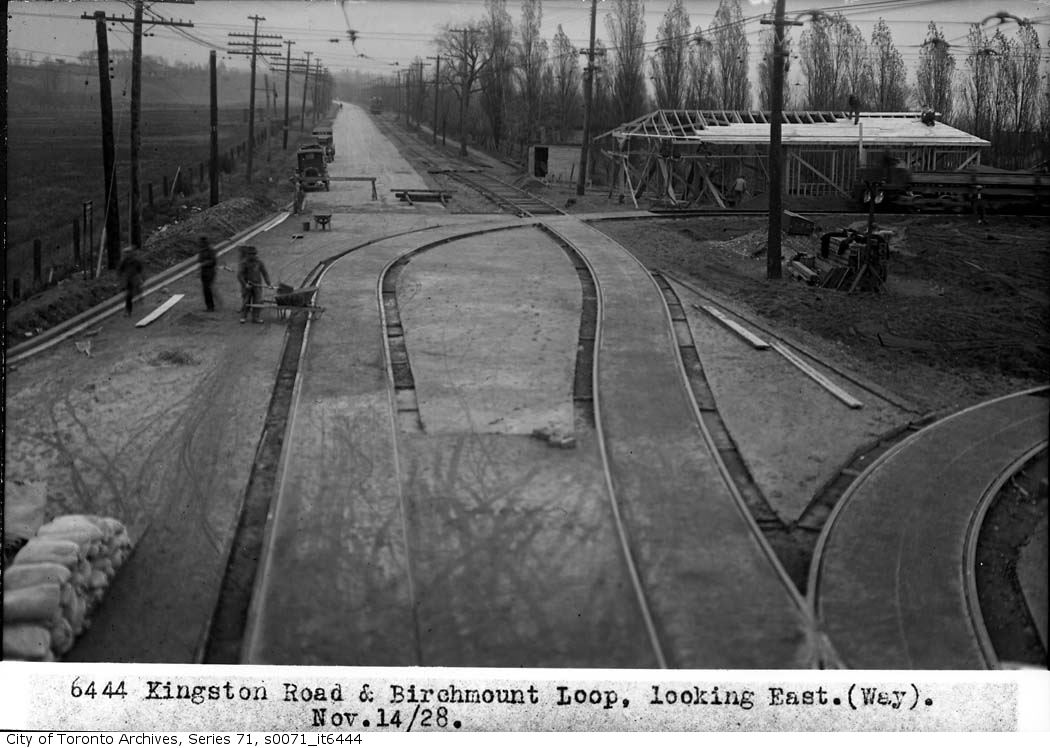
The Birchmount Loop, under construction here in 1928, marked the easternmost extension of the TTC's streetcar system. The single track going east was the Scarboro radial line, which the TTC operated from 1927-1936.

The Birchmount Loop was the easternmost loop of the Toronto streetcar system, operated by the Toronto Transit Commission. It was located at the intersection of Kingston Road and Birchmount Road in the township of Scarborough, Ontario. Scarboro radial line, originally a privately operated line, continued farther east until 1936.

When the TTC was created in 1921 it started to build streetcar service farther east. They first extended double track TTC service to the current Bingham Loop, at Victoria Park Avenue, in 1922 replacing a portion of the Scarboro radial.

The TTC stopped running Kingston Road streetcars as far as the Birchmount Loop in 1954 after the introduction of a new fare zone system and a reorganization of the suburban bus network. The streetcar route was transferred to Scarborough bus route, 86 Scarboro and now as 12 Kingston Road. The site of the old loop on the southeast corner is now occupied by a series of homes.
