= 503 Kingston Rd =

Streetcar route in Toronto, Canada

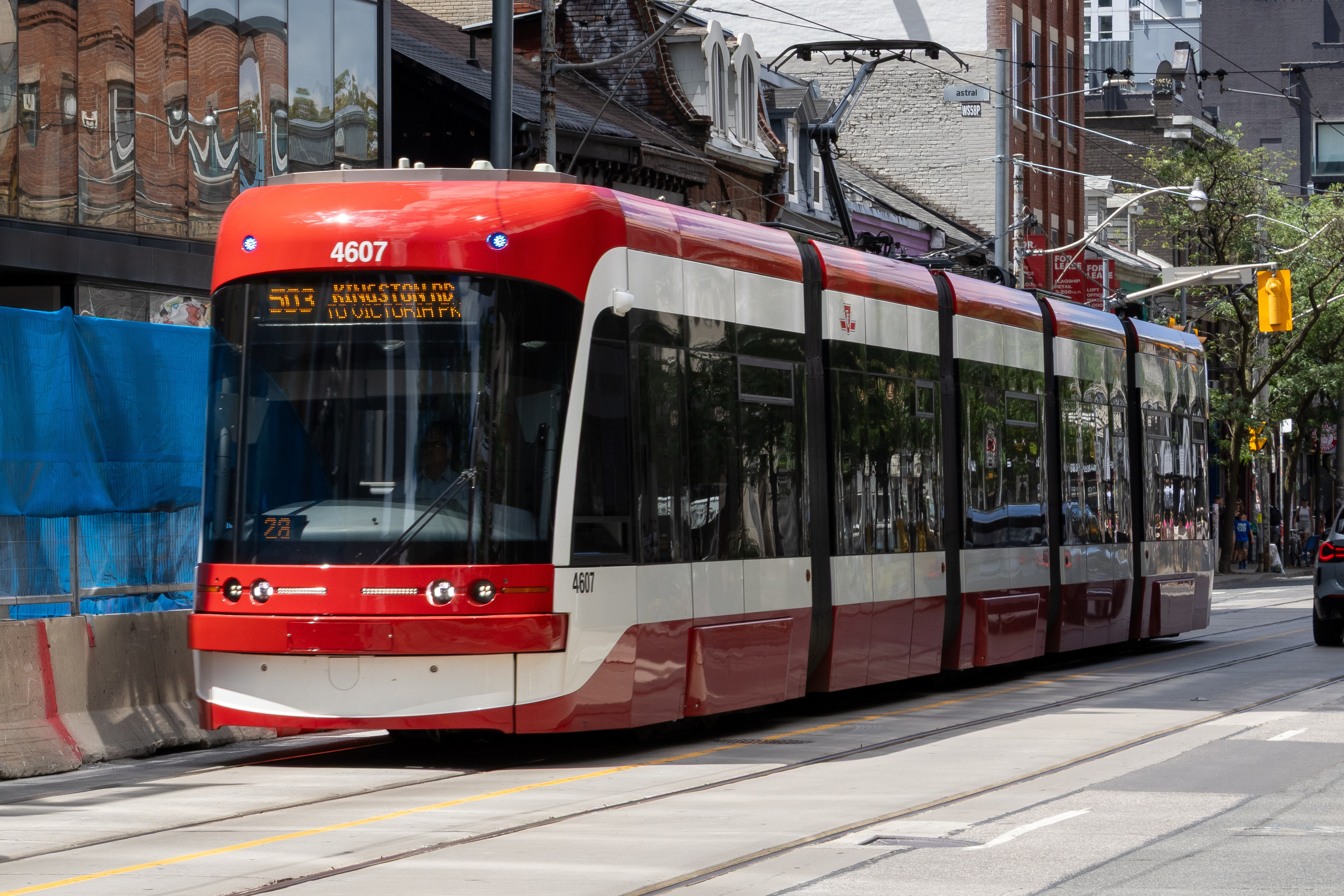
- A 503 Kingston Rd streetcar

Overview
- Locale: Toronto, Ontario
- Termini: Victoria Park Avenue (Bingham Loop, east); York Street (503, west); Roncesvalles Avenue (303, west)
- Stations: St. Andrew; King
- Website: Official route page

Service
- Type: Streetcar route
- System: Toronto streetcar system
- Route number: 503 (303 overnight)
- Operator(s): Toronto Transit Commission
- Rolling stock: Flexity Outlook
- Daily ridership: 12,700 (2025, weekdays)

History
- Opened: 1892; 134 years ago

Technical
- Line length: 9.8 km (6.1 mi)
- Track gauge: 4 ft 10 7/8 in (1,495 mm)
- Electrification: 600 V DC overhead

The 503 Kingston Rd (303 Kingston Rd during overnight periods) is an east–west Toronto streetcar route in Ontario, Canada, operated by the Toronto Transit Commission. The 503 Kingston Rd travels on a route to the downtown financial district from the Bingham Loop along Kingston Road and shares much of its track with the 501 Queen and 504 King. Originally a rush-hour service, the route was upgraded in September 2019 to run weekdays excluding evenings after the consolidation of 502 Downtowner service into this route. Route 503 in combination with overnight route 303 provide combined 24-hour service.

== Route ==
Starting at the Bingham Loop on Victoria Park Avenue, the 503 runs southwest on Kingston Road then turns west along Queen Street. At the Queen Street Viaduct bridging the Don River, it then turns southwest along King Street, enters the King Street Transit Priority Corridor but leaves it by running south of King Street via Church, Wellington and York Streets. In the vicinity of St. Andrew station, the 503 returns eastbound on King Street.

Overnight, this route operates with streetcars as 303 Kingston Rd, a part of the Blue Night Network, with a 30-minute frequency. The eastern terminal of both routes 303 and 503 is Bingham Loop, but the western terminals are different: Roncesvalles Avenue for route 303 and York Street for route 503.

== History ==
Two streetcar routes, 503 Kingston Rd and 502 Downtowner, serve Kingston Road. Route 502 Downtowner was originally named "Kingston Rd" while 503 Kingston Rd was originally named "Kingston Rd Tripper". The Kingston Rd route (today's 502 Downtowner) ran from the McCaul Loop to the Birchmount Loop until 1954 when it was cut back to the Bingham Loop. By 1968, the rush-hour route Kingston Rd Tripper (today's 503 Kingston Rd) was appearing in TTC Ride Guides. "Tripper" here means a rush-hour variant of a base route which in this case was the Kingston Rd route (today's 502 Downtowner).

In 1973, the Kingston Rd route was renamed to "Downtowner" (today's 502 Downtowner) with a route extension to Bathurst station that was revoked in 1984. Also in 1973, with the renaming of "Kingston Rd" to "Downtowner", the Kingston Rd Tripper became simply "Kingston Rd" and ultimately the 503 Kingston Rd.

Around early 1978, the TTC announced plans to number all of its streetcar routes (which had been known only by names), and the Kingston Rd route was to be number 503. The route number 503 began being displayed on streetcars' destination signs on February 4, 1980, when the Kingston Rd route was still operated entirely by PCC streetcars.

From June 19, 2017, to October 6, 2024, streetcars on route 503 terminated at Spadina Avenue (Charlotte Loop) as the western terminal instead of York Street due to construction on Wellington Street. However, when there was temporary bus substitution, 503 replacement buses would operate only to York Street.

From July 31, 2017, to February 16, 2018, buses replaced streetcars on the 503 Kingston Rd route due to a shortage of streetcars resulting from the late delivery of the Bombardier Flexity Outlook streetcars and the declining reliability of the older CLRV fleet.

On February 20, 2018, streetcars returned to route 503 Kingston Rd. However, the roles of routes 502 Downtowner and 503 Kingston Rd were reversed. Until that date, route 502 provided base workday service supplemented by route 503 in the rush hours. Since that date, route 503 provided base service while route 502 provided rush-hour-only service. These changes were originally to support the King Street Pilot Project, which resulted in increased ridership along downtown King Street. However, effective September 2, these changes were reversed, with 503 Kingston Rd operating only in the rush hours. A second reversal occurred on September 3, 2019, when the 502 Downtowner service was suspended to accommodate some construction projects and replaced with the 503 Kingston Rd service, which operated weekdays excluding evenings instead of just during rush hours. The construction projects ended in November 2019; however, the consolidation of Kingston Road service into 503 Kingston Rd remained in effect.

In March 2020, the COVID-19 pandemic resulted in a loss of ridership on the TTC. As a result, on March 24, the TTC shortened the 503 Kingston Rd route to run only along Kingston Road between Bingham Loop and Woodbine Loop. Then, effective May 11, the 22A Coxwell bus replaced the remainder of the 503 route full-time On June 22, streetcar service returned to route 503 Kingston Rd using the low-floor, accessible Flexity Outlook streetcars.

Starting November 21, 2022, the TTC scheduled buses to replace streetcars on the route to allow upgrades to the overhead wires for pantograph operation.

On May 7, 2023, route 503 Kingston Rd was suspended and replaced partially and temporarily with a diversion of the 505 Dundas streetcar. Unlike the 503 route, the 505 diversion would serve Kingston Road both day and evening, seven days per week. From Dundas Street, the 505 streetcar would divert south on Broadview Avenue, east on Queen Street and Kingston Road, terminating at Bingham Loop. The reason for the 505 diversion was the rebuilding of the streetcar loop at Broadview station and construction work on Broadview Avenue north of Gerrard Street. On July 4, the TTC reinstated the 503 route using replacement buses running between Bingham Loop and York street until 8:00 pm daily. After 8:00 pm, the 505 Dundas streetcar would replace the 503 bus along Kingston Road. Effective July 30, 503 buses replaced 505 streetcars in the evening along Kingston Road with the result that the 503 route would provide service all day and all evening, 7 days per week between Bingham Loop and York Street.

On October 8, 2023, streetcars replaced buses on route 503, operating again to Spadina Avenue (Charlotte Loop). Although the downtown loop via Church, Wellington and York Streets opened on the same day, the TTC temporarily assigned a diversion of the 501 Queen route to this loop instead of the 503. On October 6, 2024, 503 streetcars reverted to their original western terminal at York Street.

Effective September 1, 2024, the TTC created overnight route 303 Kingston Rd, running between Victoria Park Avenue (Bingham Loop) and Roncesvalles Avenue, thus providing 24-hour service on Kingston Road west of Victoria Park Avenue.

== Sites along the line ==
From east to west:

- Upper Beaches
- Leslieville
- South Riverdale
- George Brown College
- Financial District
