= 505 Dundas =

Streetcar route in Toronto, Canada

505 Dundas (305 Dundas overnight)

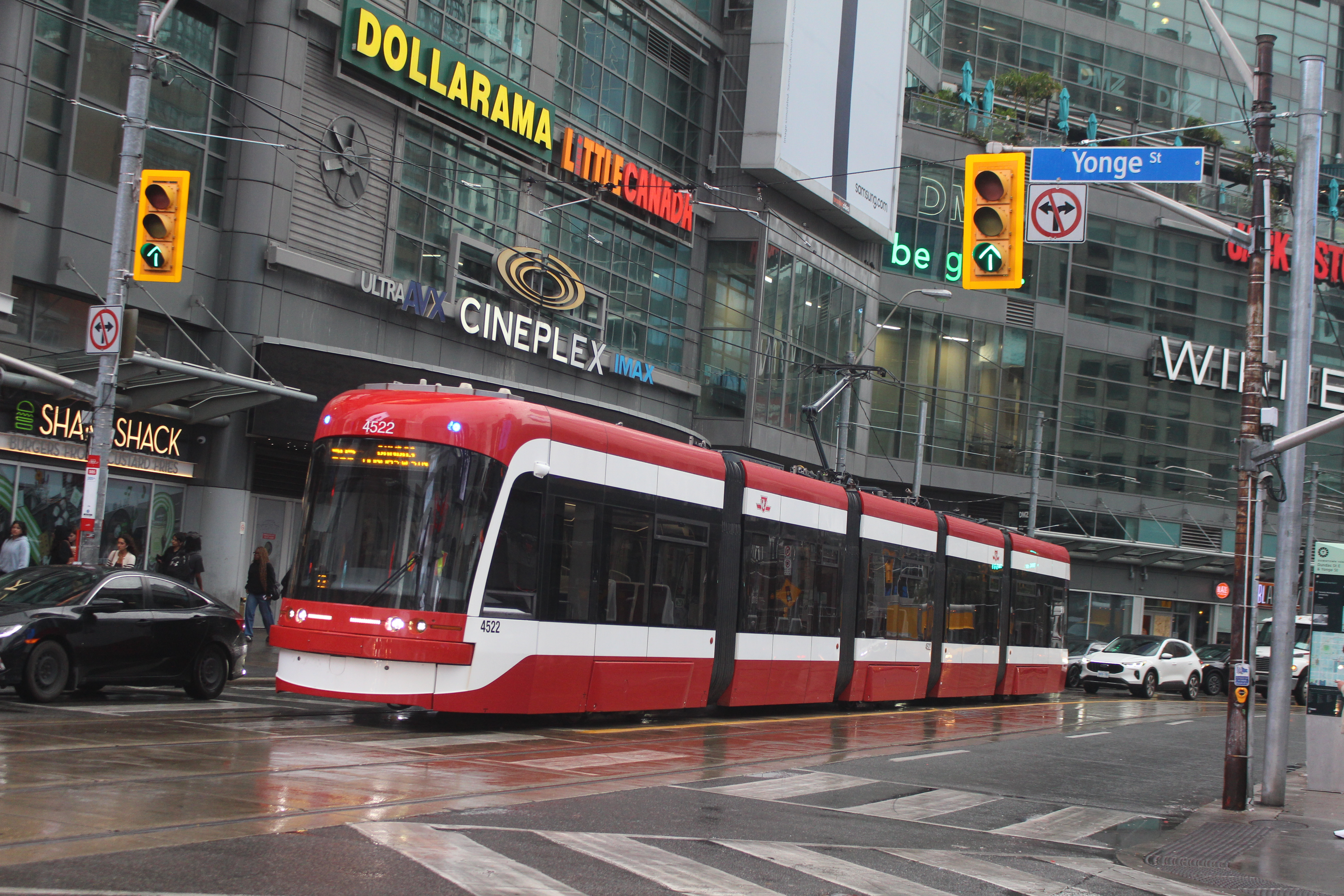
- A 505 Dundas streetcar at the intersection of Yonge and Dundas

Overview
- Locale: Toronto, Ontario
- Termini: Dundas West station (west); Broadview station (east)
- Stations: Dundas West; St. Patrick; TMU; Broadview
- Website: Official route page

Service
- Type: Streetcar route
- System: Toronto streetcar system
- Route number: 505
- Operator(s): Toronto Transit Commission
- Depot(s): Leslie Barns
- Rolling stock: Flexity Outlook
- Daily ridership: 32,100 (2025, weekdays)

History
- Opened: 1882; 144 years ago

Technical
- Line length: 12.7 km (7.89 mi)
- Track gauge: 4 ft 10 7/8 in (1,495 mm)
- Electrification: 600 V DC overhead

The 505 Dundas (305 Dundas during overnight periods) is a Toronto streetcar route run by the Toronto Transit Commission in Ontario, Canada. The route is roughly U-shaped running mainly along Dundas Street between Dundas West and Broadview stations several blocks south of the Line 2 Bloor–Danforth subway.

== Route ==
The route starts at Dundas West station on subway Line 2 Bloor–Danforth and goes south along Dundas Street West. The street curves southeast and passes Howard Park. It then passes over a bridge for the main Canadian National Railways line that runs down to Union Station. To the east of the bridge, past Lansdowne Avenue, it continues in a roughly southeast direction before turning eastward at Ossington Avenue. Downtown, the route passes subway Line 1 Yonge–University at two stations: St. Patrick station at University Avenue and TMU station at Yonge Street. It continues east towards Broadview Avenue where it turns north. The route ends at Broadview station on Line 2 Bloor–Danforth.

The route operates seven days a week from early morning to after midnight. During weekday rush hours, daytime and early evenings, average service frequency is 5 to 7 minutes. Saturday daytime services have an average frequency of 5 to 7 minutes with Sunday daytime service frequency averaging 6 to 8 minutes. Overnight, this route operates with streetcars as 305 Dundas, a part of the Blue Night Network, with a 30-minute frequency.

== History ==
Just prior to 1966, the east and west ends of Dundas Street were covered by separate streetcar routes. Dundas Street West was served by the pre-1966 Dundas streetcar route running from the Runnymede Loop at Runnymede Road to the City Hall Loop south of Bay and Dundas streets. Dundas Street East was served by part of the now-defunct Harbord streetcar line between Broadview Avenue and Spadina Avenue. The two routes overlapped between Bay Street and Spadina Avenue.

When subway Line 2 Bloor–Danforth opened in 1966, the Harbord streetcar route was abandoned, and the Dundas streetcar route was extended eastward onto Dundas Street East and then north on Broadview Avenue to terminate at Broadview station. At the west end of the line, the Dundas streetcar still operated to the Runnymede Loop passing through Dundas West station in both directions. There was still a branch to the City Hall Loop where every second eastbound Dundas streetcar used to terminate and turn back.

In 1968, the section of the Dundas streetcar line between Dundas West station and the Runnymede Loop was replaced by the 40 Junction bus. Now, except for the branch to the City Hall Loop, the Dundas route became the same as today's 505 Dundas route.

On January 6, 1975, the City Hall Loop was closed due to construction of the Eaton Centre. Any downtown short-turning of eastbound Dundas streetcars was around an on-street loop: south on Church Street, west on Queen Street, north on Victoria Street then west on Dundas Street.

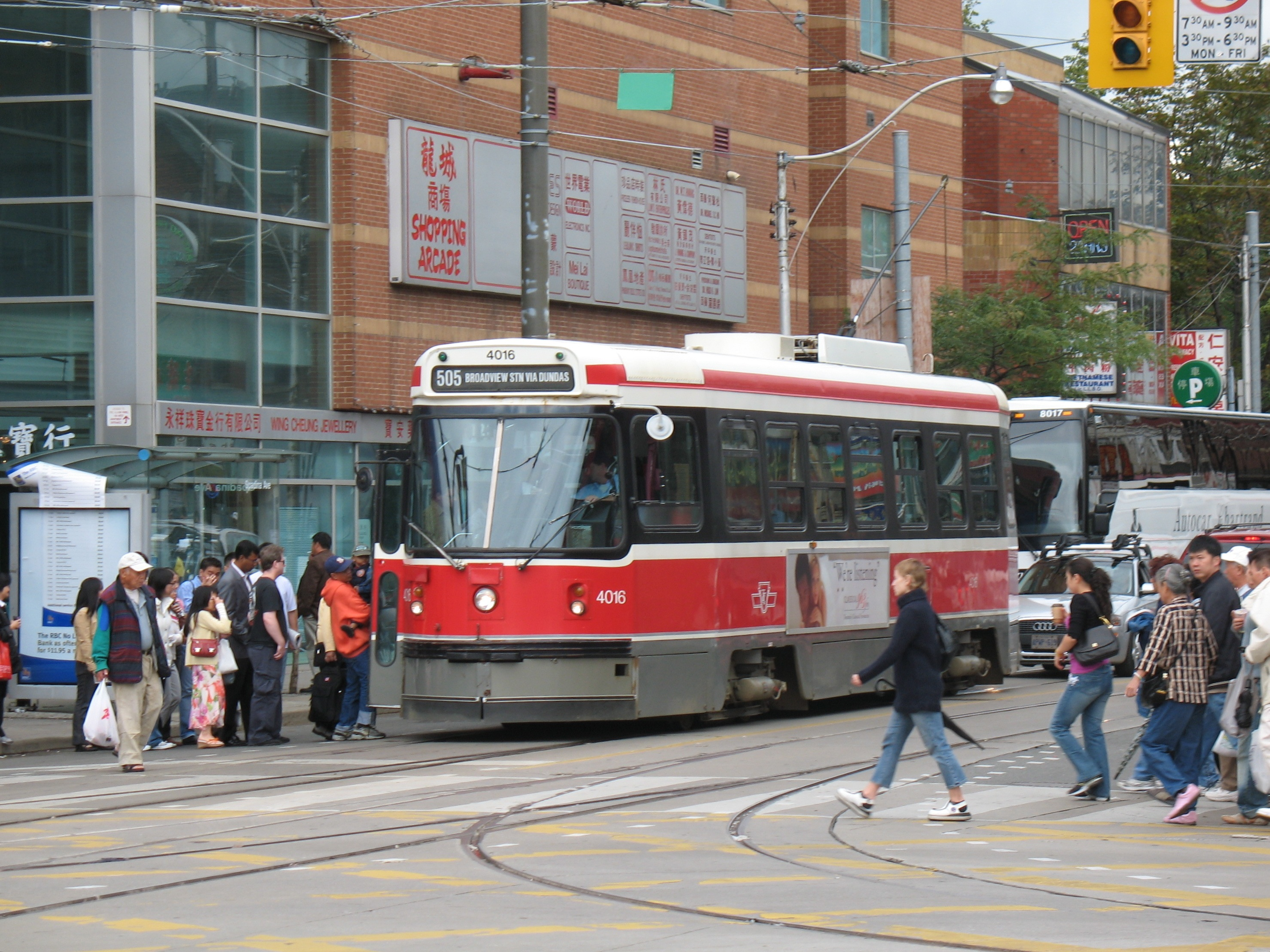
A CLRV car in Chinatown, Toronto

Around early 1978, the TTC announced plans to number all of its streetcar routes (which had been known only by names), and the Dundas route was to be number 505. The route number 505 began being displayed on the streetcars' destination signs on February 4, 1980, when the Dundas route was still operated entirely by PCC streetcars.

On February 18, 2018, the route began being operated with buses instead of streetcars due to a streetcar shortage and to reassign streetcars in order to address crowding on other routes. Streetcar service was originally expected to return on March 29, 2020, but was delayed to complete upgrades to the overhead infrastructure for pantograph operation. On April 20, 2020, Flexity Outlook streetcars went into service on 505 Dundas on the same day that streetcars were withdrawn from 511 Bathurst due to construction projects.

Following controversy over the British politician for whom Dundas Street is named – Henry Dundas, 1st Viscount Melville, who delayed the abolition of the transatlantic slave trade – Toronto City Council voted in 2021 to rename Dundas Street and other civic assets named after Dundas – including the 505 Dundas streetcar route. On December 14, 2023, the city council decided to rename a few city landmarks bearing his name but not Dundas Street due to cost.

On May 7, 2023, Broadview station and Broadview Avenue north of Gerrard Street were closed to streetcars due to construction. This resulted in a variety of diversions for the 505 Dundas streetcar, some covering for construction disruptions affecting other streetcar routes. Starting on that date, route 505 diverted south from Dundas Street and Broadview Avenue, east on Queen Street and Kingston Road, and terminated at the Bingham Loop, replacing the 503 Kingston Rd streetcar which was temporarily suspended. Starting July 4, 2023, 505 service ran only to Woodbine Loop before 8:00 pm but along Kingston Road to Bingham Loop after 8:00 pm, with service before 8:00 pm being provided by a 503 Kingston Rd replacement bus. Starting September 3, 2023, 505 streetcars were diverted farther east to Neville Park Loop temporarily replacing 501 Queen streetcars along Queen Street east of Broadview Avenue. On September 22, 2023, the 505 diversion was rerouted north on Broadview Avenue, east on Gerrard Street, south on Coxwell Avenue and then east on Queen Street to terminate at Woodbine Loop. The 505 streetcar returned to its regular route on February 18, 2024.

On July 28, 2024, overnight streetcar service was introduced, operating as 305 Dundas along the same route as 505 Dundas.

== Sites along the line ==
From west to east:

- Kensington Market
- Chinatown at Spadina Avenue
- Art Gallery of Ontario
- Sankofa Square (formerly Yonge–Dundas Square) and Toronto Eaton Centre
- Toronto Metropolitan University
- East Chinatown at Gerrard Street
