= Broadview station =

Toronto subway station

Broadview
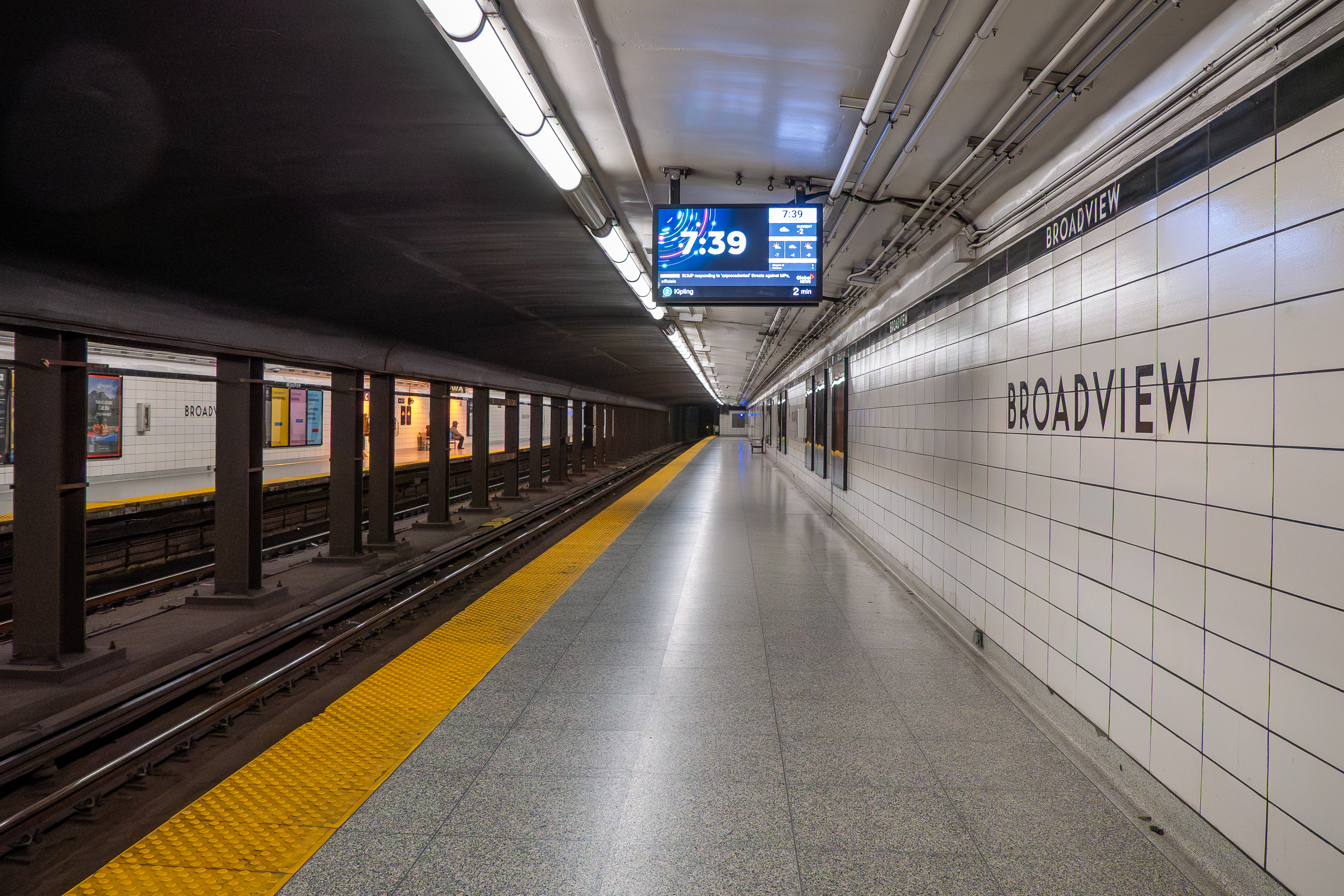

General information
- Location: 769 Broadview Avenue; Toronto, Ontario; Canada
- Coordinates: 43°40′37″N 79°21′30″W
- Platforms: Side platforms
- Tracks: 2
- Connections: TTC buses and Streetcars: 8 Broadview; 25 Don Mills; 62 Mortimer; 87 Cosburn; 100 Flemingdon Park; 300 Bloor - Danforth; 304 King; 305 Dundas; 322 Coxwell; 504B King; 505 Dundas; 925 Don Mills Express

Construction
- Structure type: Underground
- Accessible: Yes

Other information
- Website: Official station page

History
- Opened: 26 February 1966; 60 years ago

Passengers
- 2023–2024: 11,720
- Rank: 52 of 70

Services
Preceding station	Toronto Transit Commission	Following station
Castle Frank towards Kipling	Line 2 Bloor–Danforth	Chester towards Kennedy
Wolfrey Avenue towards Dufferin Gate Loop	504B King	Terminus
Wolfrey Avenue towards Dundas West	505 Dundas	Terminus
Location

Broadview is a Toronto subway station on Line 2 Bloor–Danforth in Toronto, Ontario, Canada. The entrance to the building is from Broadview Avenue just north of Danforth Avenue.

The station, which is the north-eastern terminus of the 504B King and 505 Dundas streetcar routes, has two streetcar platforms and five bus bays to allow riders to transfer between connecting routes. Wi-Fi service is available at this station.

== History ==
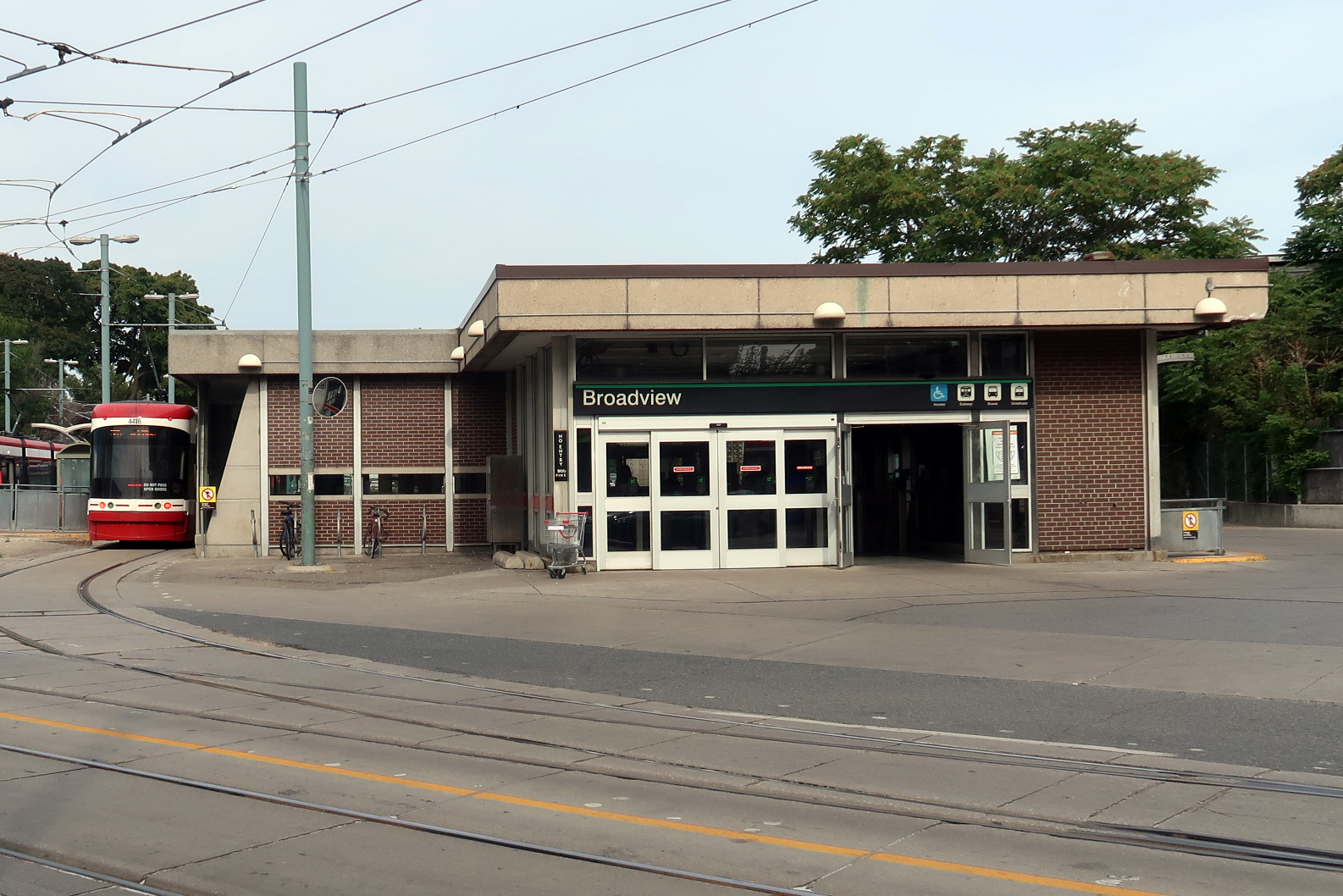
Station exterior

Broadview station was opened in 1966 as part of the original segment of the Bloor–Danforth line, from Keele station in the west to Woodbine station in the east. In that same year, the streetcar loop at Broadview station replaced the nearby Erindale Loop formerly located at the corner of Erindale and Broadview avenues.

In 2003, a renovation of the station began, adding an extra streetcar track, additional bus bays, new signage, and elevators/stairways to the platforms, satisfying fire safety requirements for a second exit. The elevators entered service in 2006, and the stairs from the westbound subway to the bus and streetcar platform followed. The next stage of the renovation was to build a stairway from the bus and streetcar platform to the eastbound subway platform. This was completed and opened in 2008; however, it was closed shortly afterwards due to water ingress. It has since been re-opened.

In early 2020, the 504 King streetcar platform was extended to accommodate two Flexity Outlook streetcars in order to relieve the queuing of streetcars waiting on the street to enter the station.

From May 7, 2023, to February 18, 2024, streetcar service was suspended for track and utility work along Broadview Avenue north of Gerrard Street, as well as track replacement for the station's streetcar loop. The bus loop had a shorter closure period. When streetcar service resumed, platform assignments were changed with the 505 using the longer track (holding two streetcars) and the 504B streetcar using the shorter track.

On June 24, 2024, Broadview station served the eastern terminal of the 508 Lake Shore route. The rush-hour service used the same platform as 504 Dundas. On September 2, 2025, route 508 Lake Shore was cut back to Distillery Loop on Cherry Street south of King, and service to Broadview Station was removed.

== Nearby landmarks ==
The station, located at the east end of the Prince Edward Viaduct, serves the local communities of Playter Estates, Greektown and Riverdale and nearby destinations such as Danforth Music Hall and Riverdale Park.

== Parkette ==
Broadview Subway Station Parkette
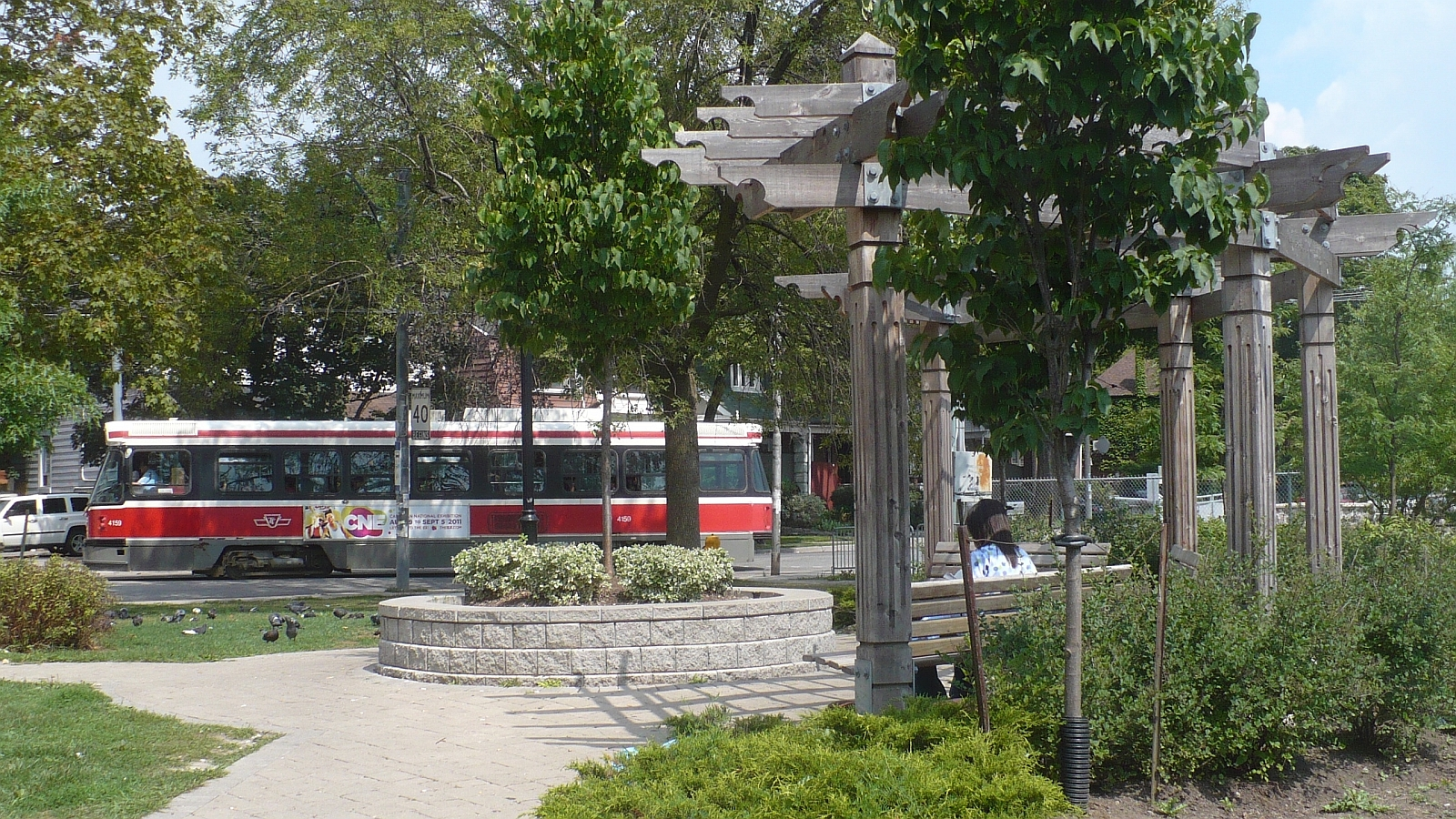
- Interactive map of Broadview Subway Station Parkette
- Location: 769 Broadview Ave at Erindale
- Coordinates: 43°40′38″N 79°21′30″W
- Area: 932 m^{2} (10,030 sq ft)
- Operator: Toronto Parks

The northwest corner of the station property, which was not required for transit purposes, was leased to the former City of Toronto's Parks Department, since the early 1970s, for use as a public park. During the upgrading of the station facilities in the 2000s, part of the parkette land was required to expand the streetcar platforms and the remainder was used as a staging area during the construction. Subsequently, in 2010 the TTC declared this portion of the site surplus to its operating requirements and the City of Toronto, Parks, Forestry and Recreation agreed to maintain the re-landscaped land for use as a parkette.

== Surface connections ==
When the subway is closed, an on-street transfer is required at the parkette. TTC routes serving the station include:

Bay number	Route	Name	Additional information
1	100A	Flemingdon Park	Northbound to Don Valley station via Grenoble Drive
1	100B	Flemingdon Park	Northbound to Don Valley station via Linkwood Lane
2	925	Don Mills Express	Northbound to Steeles Avenue East via Don Mills station
3	25A	Don Mills	Northbound to Steeles Avenue East via Don Mills station
3	25B	Don Mills	Northbound to Don Mills station
4	87A	Cosburn	Eastbound to Main Street station via East York Acres
4	87C	Cosburn	Eastbound to Main Street station
4	Wheel-Trans		
N/A	8	Broadview	Northbound to Warden station via O'Connor Drive
N/A	8	Broadview	Southbound to Hennick Bridgepoint Hospital
N/A	62	Mortimer	Eastbound to Main Street station
N/A	62	Mortimer	Westbound to Hennick Bridgepoint Hospital
N/A	304	King	Blue Night Streetcar service; westbound to Dundas West station
N/A	305	Dundas	Blue Night Streetcar service; westbound to Dundas West station
N/A	504B	King	Streetcar; westbound to Dufferin Gate Loop
N/A	505	Dundas	Streetcar; westbound to Dundas West Station
