= 521 Exhibition East =

Former streetcar route in Toronto, Ontario

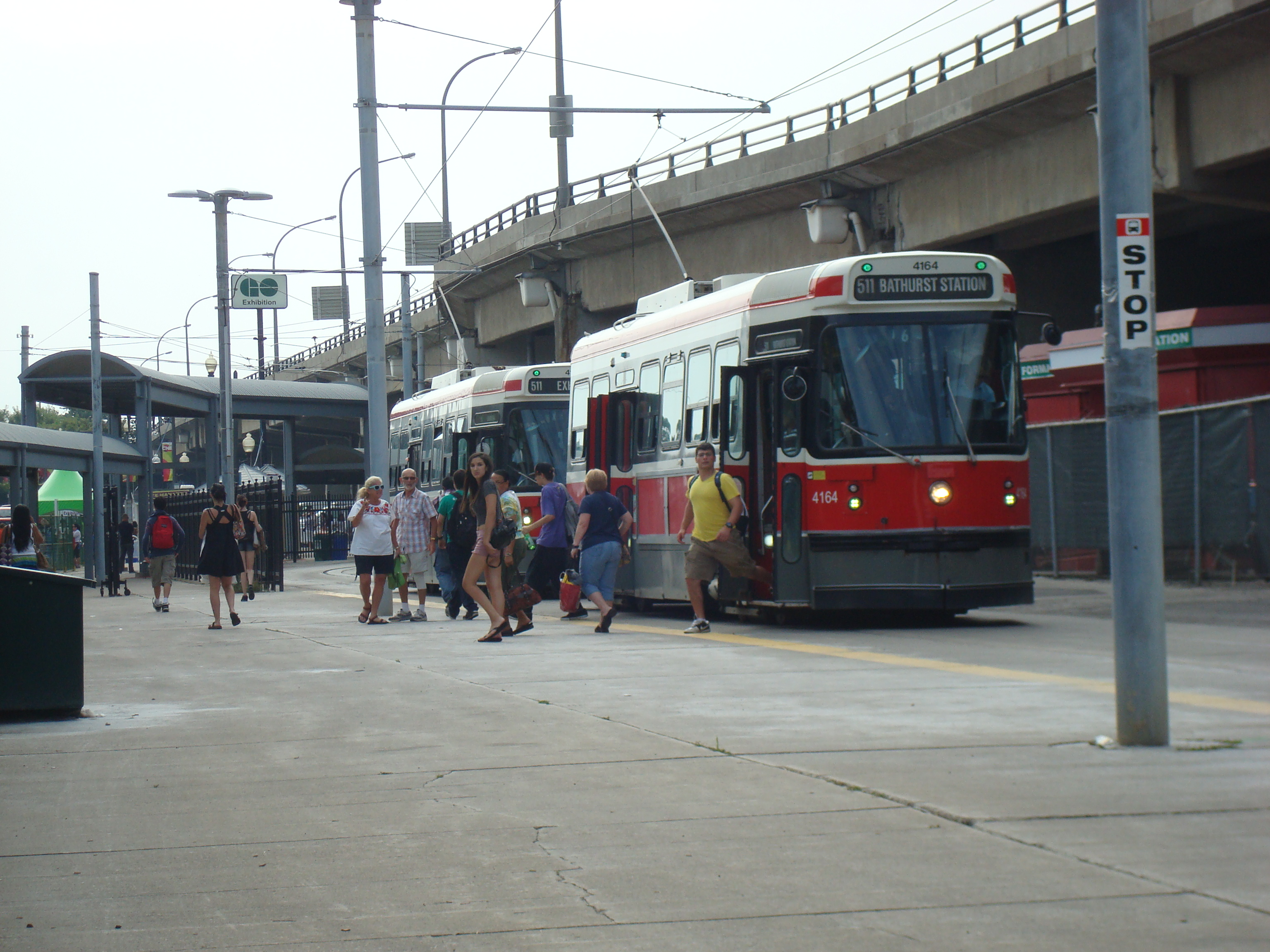
- Streetcars at Exhibition Loop during the 2013 Canadian National Exhibition

Overview
- Locale: Toronto, Ontario
- Termini: Exhibition (West); Church Street (East)
- Stations: Exhibition Loop; St. Andrew; King

Service
- Type: Streetcar Route
- Route number: 521
- Operator(s): Toronto Transit Commission
- Rolling stock: CLRV

Technical
- Track gauge: 4 ft 10 7/8 in (1,495 mm) Toronto gauge
- Electrification: 600 VDC Overhead

521 Exhibition East was a streetcar route in Toronto, Ontario, Canada, operated by the Toronto Transit Commission from the 1960s to 1986 and briefly again in 1995 and 2013.

== History ==
The 521 Exhibition East is the last surviving streetcar route to serve the Canadian National Exhibition. In August 1980, the name "Exhibition East" was finally made official, from the former streetcar route name, "King Exhibition." This streetcar route operated on special occasions and events that took place at Exhibition Place, such as the Canadian National Exhibition, and the Molson Indy. It was only six months earlier, on February 4, 1980, that streetcars serving the route began displaying a route number for the first time – having previously shown only a route name – as the route briefly became 521 King Exhibition, before becoming 521 Exhibition East.

Route 521 operated from Richmond, via Victoria and Queen Streets, then west to Church Street. It continued west on King Street, south on Bathurst Street, and then west on Fleet Street, proceeding directly to the Exhibition Loop.

On the other hand, another streetcar route named 522 Exhibition West operated alongside 521. This route operated from Dundas West Station, where it would run south on Roncesvalles, east on King Street, south on Dufferin, straight to the Dufferin Gates at Exhibition Place. This streetcar route, like route 521, operated only on special occasions. Labour Day in 1986 marked its final day of service. It was later replaced by the 93 Exhibition West bus but was reinstated for one year in 1995 during the CNE.

== Resurrection ==
In August 2013, the 521 Exhibition East route was temporarily reinstated because of ongoing construction affecting the 509 Harbourfront line, which ran from Union Station to the Exhibition Loop. On the other hand, the 522 Exhibition West route was reinstated as route 193 Exhibition Rocket, which ran from Dundas West station to Exhibition Loop, though that service was discontinued in 2018. Later that year, the 929 Dufferin express started operating from Dufferin gate loop to Dufferin station before continuing north.

In 2016, the 514 Cherry started operations and ran from Dufferin gate to Distillery loop, effectively an extension of the 521 except it terminates at the loop to the west of the CNE rather than the east. Later in 2018, the 514 was merged into the 504 King, creating the 504B From Dufferin gate loop to Broadview station.

== Route ==
The route of the 521 started at Exhibition Loop, and ran east on Fleet Street, north on Bathurst Street, then east on King Street West, passing by both St. Andrew Station and King Station, then terminating at Church Street. The route shared its tracks with the 504 King on King Street, the 509 Harbourfront on Fleet Street, and the 511 Bathurst on Fleet Street and Bathurst Street.

== See also ==
- Toronto streetcar system
- 504 King
