= Waterfront West LRT =

Proposed streetcar line in Toronto, Ontario

Overview
- Status: Cancelled in 2010; revived in 2017
- Locale: Toronto, Ontario
- Termini: Union station; Long Branch

Service
- Type: Streetcar
- System: Toronto streetcar system
- Operator(s): Toronto Transit Commission

The Waterfront West LRT (WWLRT) is a proposed streetcar line in Toronto, Ontario, Canada. The WWLRT is currently part of a municipal project called the Waterfront Transit Reset which also includes the Waterfront East LRT. The WWLRT was initially proposed as part of the Transit City plan to expand transit services offered by the Toronto Transit Commission that was announced March 16, 2007. The new line was to use existing parts of the Toronto streetcar system, extending from Union station to Long Branch Loop via Exhibition Place.

The originally proposed WWLRT was abandoned when Mayor of Toronto Rob Ford cancelled the entire Transit City project on December 1, 2010. However, an October 2015 city report recommended that the project be reconsidered in the context of other Waterfront transit projects, a mandate which resulted in the Waterfront Transit Reset study. In November 2017, the study produced a series of recommendations which, if they were all implemented, would result in a Waterfront West line quite similar to the Transit City proposal.

In April 2019, the City of Toronto decided to proceed to procurement and construction on the recommendation designated the "Exhibition Place–Dufferin Gate Loop streetcar connection", describing it as "a priority segment of the Waterfront Transit Network Plan".

== History ==
Announced on March 16, 2007, the WWLRT was part of Mayor David Miller's Transit City proposal. As the shortest and least expensive Transit City line, it was expected to cost approximately $540 million. The line was to open in four stages and be completed by 2015 as the third of the seven Transit City lines after the Sheppard East LRT and Etobicoke–Finch West LRT (later reconstituted as the Finch West LRT). Unlike the other Transit City lines, this service would share infrastructure and 4 ft 10 7/8 in (1,495 mm) track gauge with the streetcar system; the other LRTs would not be compatible with the city's streetcars and use larger LRT vehicles on 1,435 mm (4 ft 8 1/2 in) standard gauge tracking. In 2008, the WWLRT was included in Metrolinx's regional transportation plan The Big Move as part of the 15-year horizon.

After taking office in December 2010, Mayor Rob Ford announced cancellation of the line; this decision was never brought to city council for approval and the line's status remained in question. Funding had not been secured for the project. In January 2013, the project was shelved by Toronto city officials.

On October 9, 2015, a city staff report titled Waterfront Transit Reset said that there was a clear need for a "reset" because recent waterfront transit planning had been ad hoc and incremental, resulting in a lack of a comprehensive plan for the transit network to respond to the rapid changes occurring along the waterfront. In the report, the deputy city manager recommended that:

City Council direct City staff, working with the TTC and Waterfront Toronto, to undertake a comprehensive review of waterfront transit initiatives and options, and provide a status update to Executive Committee in Q2 of 2016.

The Waterfront Transit Reset report also said:

Notwithstanding the fact that both the Waterfront West and Waterfront East LRTs are ranked in the top five unfunded rapid transit proposals in the preliminary analysis of "Feeling Congested?", there has been little funding allocated for waterfront transit projects.

On November 13, 2017, a report about the Waterfront Transit Reset was presented to the TTC board. It included a number of recommendations to improve streetcar service along the lakeshore between Long Branch and Leslie Street. If the recommendations pertaining to streetcar service between Long Branch and Union station had been implemented, the resultant route would have had a strong resemblance to the original Waterfront West LRT.

In April 2019, the City of Toronto decided that the "Exhibition Loop–Dufferin Loop streetcar connection" project would proceed to procurement and construction in 2019/2020 as "a priority segment of the Waterfront Transit Network Plan".

== Route layout ==
A map of the Waterfront West project in relation to existing tracks.

There are two versions of the route: the Transit City version of 2007 and the Waterfront Transit Reset version of 2017. Both are essentially the same route with only a few differences.

The Waterfront West line would run for about 11 kilometres (6.8 mi). The western terminus would be Long Branch Loop at Long Branch GO Station in Etobicoke. The line would run along Lake Shore Boulevard West, following the existing 501 Queen route through Humber Loop, and along the Queensway. A new right of way would parallel King Street West east of Roncesvalles Avenue and follow the rail corridor through the existing Exhibition Loop area. It would continue via the existing 509 Harbourfront route to Union station.

In the 2007 version, the Etobicoke portion of the line would travel entirely in an exclusive right-of-way; the 2017 version would use mixed traffic west of Park Lawn Road. The 2007 version considered using new tracks along Fort York Boulevard and Bremner Boulevard to avoid complex intersections such as at Fleet Street and Bathurst Street; the 2017 version would use existing tracks on Fleet Street and Queens Quay West.

== Waterfront Transit Reset study ==
The Waterfront Transit Reset study resulted in a number of recommendations to improve streetcar service along the lakeshore between Long Branch and Union station. Most of the recommendations could be implemented independently. The recommendations from Long Branch to Bay Street included:

- Between Long Branch and Park Lawn, city and TTC staff proposed enhancements such as streetcar signal priority, improved TTC–GO connections at Long Branch, streetcar boarding platforms, etc. A dedicated streetcar right of way along this section was not considered as the projected ridership would not be high enough by 2041 (1,100 people in the peak hour).
- In the Park Lawn area, city and TTC staff proposed a new streetcar and bus loop to be built east of Park Lawn Road, north of Lake Shore Boulevard. It would allow more frequent service west to as Park Lawn to serve existing and future developments in the area.
- Between Park Lawn Road and Humber, the city and TTC would design a dedicated streetcar right of way to eliminate running streetcars in mixed traffic. This was considered a high-priority project.
- Between Humber and Exhibition Place, the city, the TTC and Metrolinx would plan a new "Humber Bay Link streetcar line", to be built along Lake Shore Boulevard, branching off the Queensway at Colborne Lodge Drive and running to Exhibition Place. The creation of this enhancement would depend on increases in ridership to justify the construction costs. Such a line would increase capacity between south Etobicoke and Swansea to downtown, improve service reliability and provide relief to the existing streetcar routes on Queen Street and King Street. The alternative alignment from the King/Queen/Roncesvalles intersection via the railway and Gardiner Expressway to Exhibition Place was considered but was determined to be technically impractical.
- At Exhibition Place, the TTC would seek funding to design and construct a streetcar connection between Dufferin Gate Loop and Exhibition Loop. The immediate use of this connection would be to link tracks on King Street to those on Queens Quay via Exhibition Place. Later, it would be used by the Humber Bay Link streetcar line. The TTC said this is a "high priority" project and there were benefits even without the Humber Bay Link; however, the report did not describe the benefits.
- From Exhibition to Bay, city and TTC staff proposed enhancements such as improved transit signal priority, and improved signage and signals to better delineate the streetcar right of way. This would improve the speed and safety of streetcar service.
- At the Bathurst/Lake Shore/Fleet intersection, the city and the TTC would plan changes affecting streetcar track alignment and road traffic patterns. Changes would include moving streetcar tracks on Bathurst Street to the west side of the road to reduce delays caused by automobile traffic.
- At Union station, the streetcar loop would be modified to increase capacity.

=== Exhibition Place–Dufferin Gate Loop streetcar connection ===
In April 2019, the TTC proposed the following features to connect Exhibition Loop to Dufferin Gate Loop at Exhibition Place:

- At Exhibition Loop, the direction of the inner siding on the south side of the present loop would effectively be converted from eastbound to westbound. A new westbound track would run diagonally from the north side of the loop to its south side. At the southwest side of the loop, a pair of new off-street tracks would be extended westward, running parallel to the railway corridor on its south side.
- At Centennial Park (in Exhibition Place, not to be confused with Centennial Park in Etobicoke), a new streetcar stop would be added on the east side of Dufferin Street just before the new tracks from Exhibition Loop turn north to cross the bridge over the railway tracks. In some future phase, tracks would be extended due west from this new stop for a future Humber Bay Link streetcar line.
- Dufferin Gate Loop would be modified to reverse streetcars coming from Exhibition Loop as well as those coming from King Street West. A through siding would be added on the south side of Dufferin Gate Loop.

The benefits of Exhibition Place to Dufferin Gate Loop streetcar connection were described in the April 2019 Transit Expansion Update as follows:

The new streetcar connection would allow the extension of existing TTC streetcar service west from Exhibition Place to Dufferin Street, and ... would increase transit capacity and provide new direct TTC journey opportunities in Parkdale, the Queensway, and Humber Bay Shores. The connection would operate in a year-round dedicated right of way, and not be affected by events at Exhibition Place. The streetcar connection would replace the existing 29 Dufferin bus service that operates into Exhibition Place, and ... would also provide significantly improved connections and resiliency in the TTC's streetcar network, and would be designed to serve every-day transit trips as well as periods of high ridership and service demands during events at Exhibition Place.

== See also ==
- Transit City
- Toronto streetcar system
- Waterfront East LRT
