= Dufferin Gate Loop =

Bus station and streetcar turning loop in Toronto, Ontario, Canada

General information
- Location: Dufferin Street; Toronto, Ontario; Canada
- Coordinates: 43°38′04″N 79°25′33″W
- Owner: Toronto Transit Commission
- Lines: 29 929
- Tracks: 1

Construction
- Structure type: terminal building with dispatcher's tower; staff facility rebuilt at west entrance in 1996

History
- Opened: 1898; 128 years ago
- Rebuilt: 1960-1961, 2013, 2016 (poles replacement)

Services
Preceding station	Toronto Transit Commission	Following station
Terminus	504B King	St. Andrew towards Broadview
Location

Dufferin Gate Loop, also known as Dufferin Loop, is a Toronto Transit Commission (TTC) bus station and turning loop for streetcars near the southern end of Dufferin Street in Toronto, Ontario, Canada. During the Canadian National Exhibition (CNE), the loop becomes a primary access point for visitors entering Exhibition Place via the Dufferin Gates. This west entrance to the CNE can be reached by the Dufferin Street bridges across the Lakeshore West railway corridor and Gardiner Expressway.

== Description ==
Southbound streetcars on Dufferin Street run counter-clockwise through the loop; west on Springhurst Avenue; south on Fort Rouille Street; enter the station eastbound; and exit back onto Dufferin Street northbound. Buses on layover park at the west end of the station, south of the tracks. At the corner of Dufferin Street and Springhurst Avenue, there is also a north-to-west track that allows loop-the-loop (continuous loop) movements.

The structure has a small semi-enclosed waiting area, gates and office space with a dispatcher tower. To process the large number of people at the time of the CNE, the loading platform can be operated as a fare-paid area and the ticket booths, turnstiles and dispatcher control tower come into use, allowing passengers to board streetcars and buses by any door.

There are streetcar tracks on Dufferin Street from Queen Street West, crossing King Street West, ending at Dufferin Gate Loop. With the special work at Queen and King Streets, Dufferin Gate Loop can turn westbound streetcars on Queen Street and both east- and westbound streetcars on King Street.

The current surface routes using Dufferin Gate Loop are:

- 29A Dufferin bus from Wilson station via Dufferin station.
- 929 Dufferin Express bus, the limited stop variant of route 29A.
- 504B King streetcar from Broadview station via King and St. Andrew stations.

== History ==
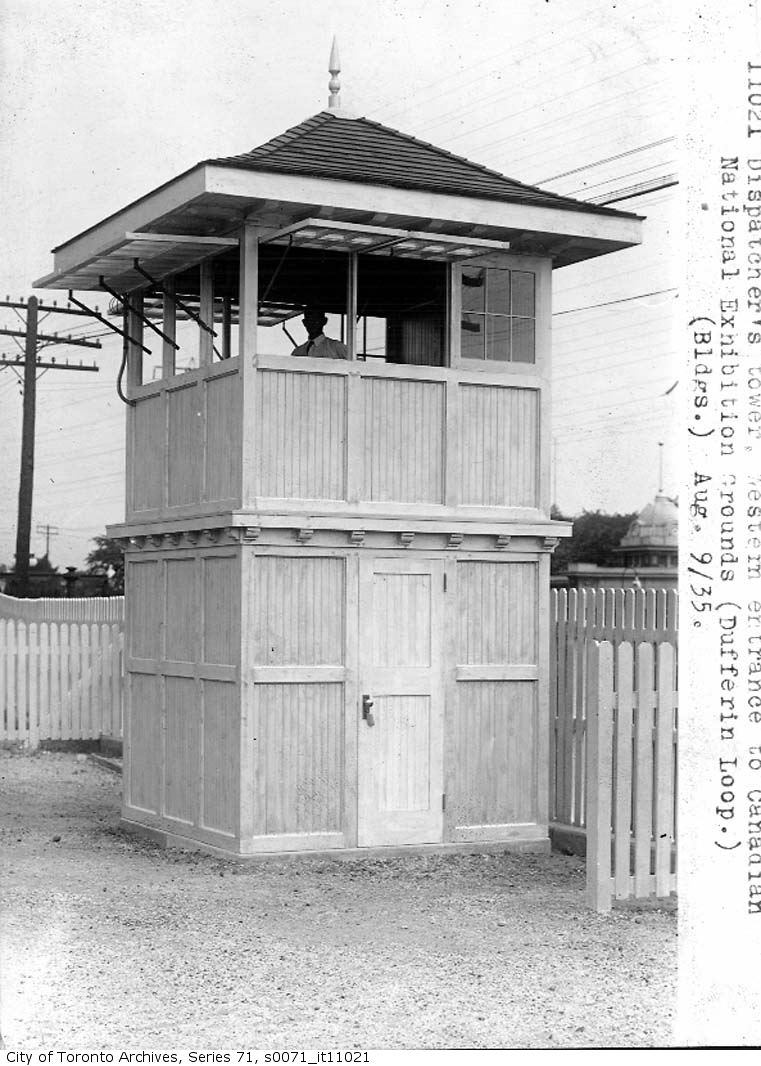
Old dispatch tower c. 1920

In 1898, the Toronto Railway Company (TRC) built Dufferin Gate Loop to replace a crossover in Dufferin Street at Springhurst Avenue (then known as Huxley). At the time that the Toronto Transportation Commission acquired the TRC in 1921, the loop had the same configuration as the present-day loop except for a short tail track on Springhurst Avenue west of Fort Rouille Street.

The pedestrian entrance to the loop was originally through a wood-frame structure that was rebuilt and renovated after 1960. The most recent renewal of the streetcar tracks was in 2013.

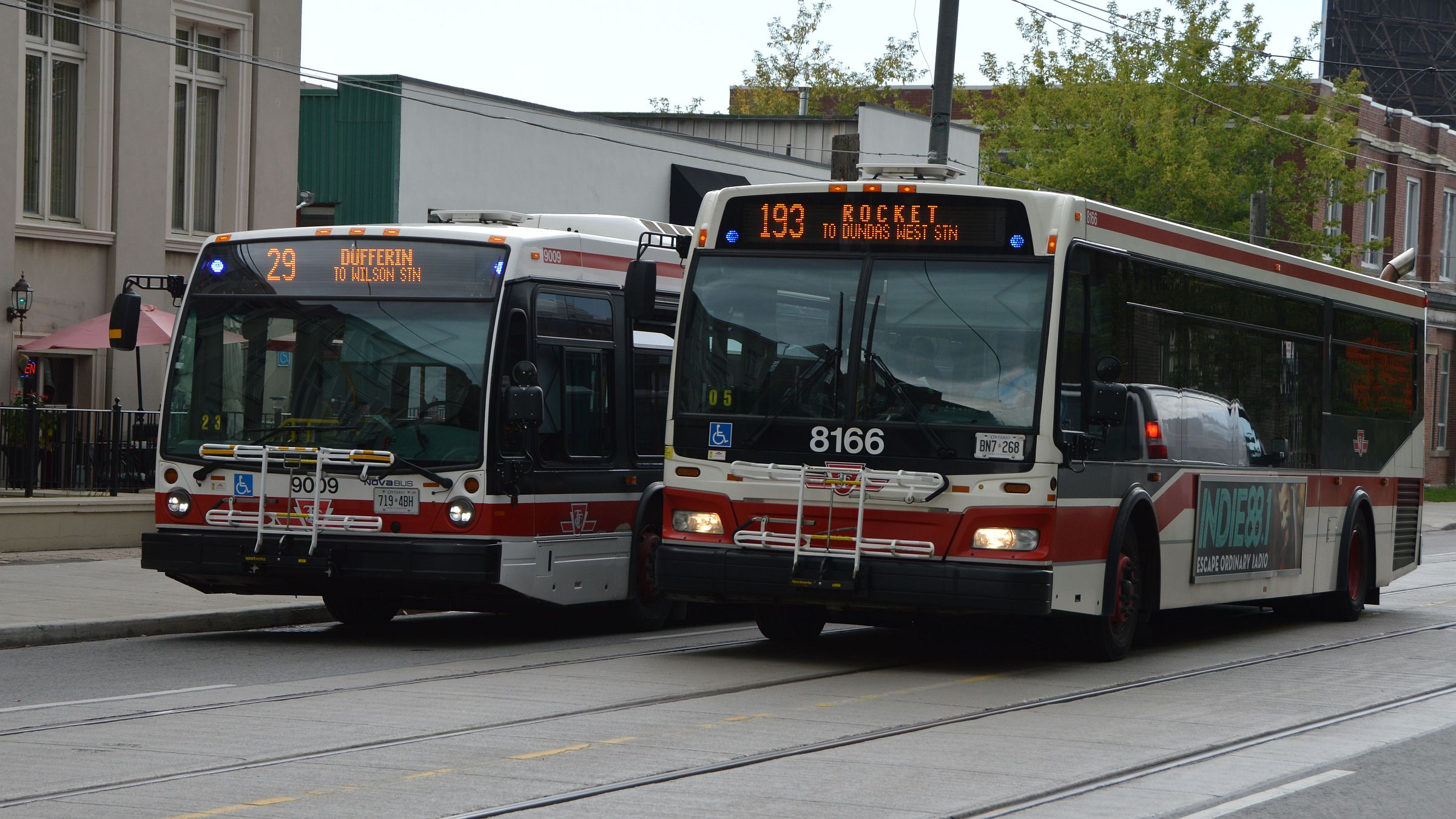
29 Dufferin and 193 Exhibition Rocket buses northbound

Dufferin Gate Loop used to be the terminus of the seasonal 522 Exhibition West streetcar which operated during the CNE from Dundas West station via Roncesvalles Avenue, King Street and Dufferin Street. This service was subsequently replaced by the 193 Exhibition Rocket bus, a non-stop express bus running from Dundas West station along Dundas Street West and south on Dufferin Street. During the CNE in 2018, the TTC eliminated route 193 as it was considered redundant when Dufferin Station became accessible with elevators; the TTC then recommended that riders use bus route 29 Dufferin instead. In October 2018, a new bus route, 929 Dufferin Express, supplemented route 29 but with fewer stops.

On June 19, 2016, the TTC started service on a new streetcar route, the 514 Cherry, which ran from the Dufferin Gate Loop along King Street to Sumach Street, where it would turn south to its eastern terminus, Distillery Loop. Service began with a few low-floor Flexity vehicles in use. Both termini of the new route are quite near new residential neighbourhoods constructed on real estate that had previously been zoned for light industry. TTC riders in Liberty Village, near the Dufferin Loop, had experienced years of frustration because, during rush hour, they would regularly find that the vehicles they wanted to board were already too full, and they could not get on board. The nearby loops would ensure that riders from Liberty Village, in the west, or from the Canary District and the Distillery District in the east, could count on being able to board empty vehicles.

On October 7, 2018, the 514 Cherry was discontinued as part of the Toronto King Street Pilot Project, and the 504 King streetcar was split into two branches: the 504A Dundas West Station to Distillery Loop and the 504B Broadview Station to Dufferin Gate; as a result, the loop is today served by 504B streetcars.

== Future ==
In April 2019, as the first phase of the Waterfront West LRT project, the TTC proposed a westward connection through Exhibition Place from Exhibition Loop to Dufferin Street and then north to connect with Dufferin Gate Loop and the existing tracks to King Street. The loop would be modified to turn streetcars coming in both directions and a through siding would be added on the south side. The City approved this work for procurement and construction.
