= 522 Exhibition West =

Former streetcar route in Toronto, Ontario

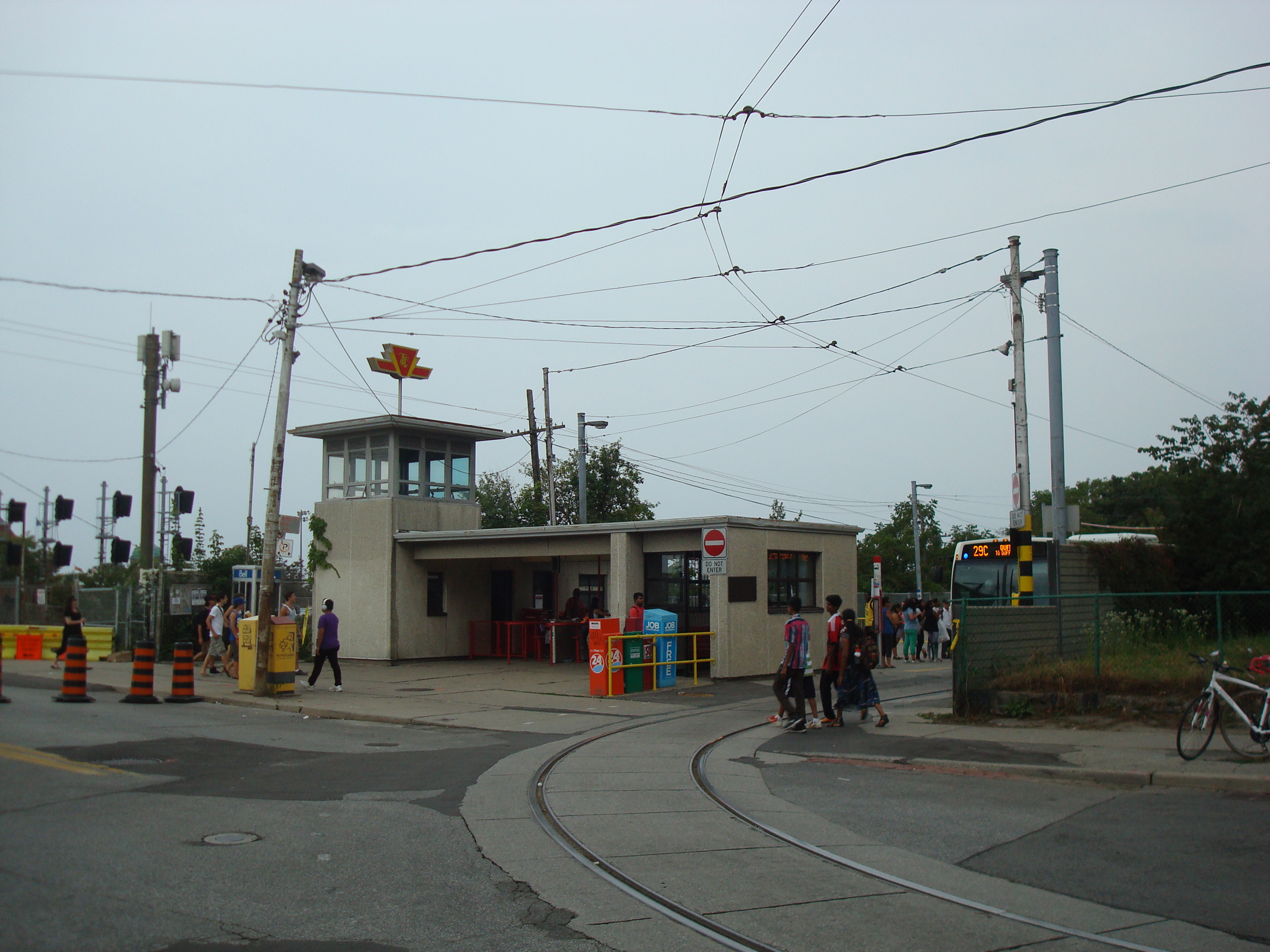
- Dufferin Loop during the 2013 CNE

Overview
- Locale: Toronto, Ontario
- Termini: Dundas West (west); Dufferin Gate Loop (east)
- Stations: Dundas West; Dufferin Loop

Service
- Type: Streetcar Route
- Route number: 522
- Operator(s): Toronto Transit Commission
- Rolling stock: CLRV

History
- Opened: 1966
- Closed: 1986; 39 years ago

Technical
- Track gauge: 4 ft 10 7/8 in (1,495 mm) Toronto gauge
- Electrification: 600 V DC overhead

522 Exhibition West was a streetcar route in Toronto, Ontario, Canada, operated by the Toronto Transit Commission from the 1960s to 1986.

== History ==
The Toronto Transit Commission (TTC), and the private streetcar companies that preceded it, ran special streetcar service to the CNE from the 19th Century.

The TTC ran a seasonal streetcar service named the 522 Dundas Exhibition, to serve the Canadian National Exhibition. In 1980, this route was officially renamed "Exhibition West," from the former name "Dundas Exhibition." This streetcar route operated on special occasions and events that took place at Exhibition Place, such as the Canadian National Exhibition, and the Molson Indy. It was at that time, February 1980, that the route was given the number 522, its predecessor having been designated only by a name.

522 operated from Dundas West station, running south on Roncesvalles, east on King Street, south on Dufferin Street, and south towards the Dufferin Gates at Exhibition Place.

The 522 route began service when the TTC opened the Bloor–Danforth subway line in 1966. The TTC discontinued the route in 1986 and replaced it with the 93 Exhibition West route, but reinstated it for one year in 1995, due to the large number of buses required to shuttle passengers on the Spadina line, because of the Russell Hill accident on August 11, 1995.

A similar event-only route, the 521 King Exhibition (now known as the 521 Exhibition East) also only served the CNE during special events.

== Resurrection ==
Unlike the counterpart of this route (521 Exhibition East), 522 was reinstated in 1988, not as a streetcar route, but as 93 Exhibition West, which was also a seasonal service that ran only during the CNE and other special occasions. The 93 was later renamed the 193 Exhibition Rocket on November 23, 2002, as a TTC marketing strategy to brand regular-fare express services as "Rocket" routes.

The 193 buses operated from Dundas West Station, southeast on Dundas Street West, south on Dufferin Street to Springhurst Avenue at Dufferin gate loop. This route operated as a seasonal express service. In August 2018, service ended on the 193 during the 2018 CNE, since it was considered redundant since Dufferin station became accessible with elevators. Later that same year, the 929 Dufferin express started running and currently operates from Dufferin gate loop to Dufferin station on Line 2 Bloor–Danforth, then heads north to Wilson station; however, the 929 is not a non-stop service.

== See also ==
- Toronto streetcar system
- List of Toronto Transit Commission bus routes
- 504 King - current routes which travel along sections of tracks used by 522
