= Steve Munro =

Canadian author and transit advocate

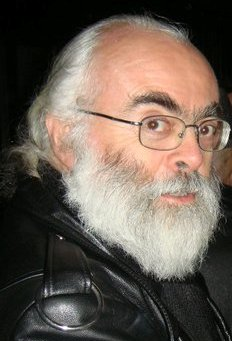
- Steve Munro, transit activist
- Born: 7 September 1948 (age 78)
- Occupations: Transit advocate, author, computer systems manager (retired)
- Website: stevemunro.ca

Steve Munro (born 7 September 1948) is a Canadian blogger and transit advocate from Toronto, Ontario. Munro has been credited in playing a lead role in the grass-roots efforts to convince the Toronto City Council to reverse plans to abandon Toronto's remaining streetcars.

== Work ==
Munro has written several technical reports on transit. Since 2006, he has written a blog that is frequently quoted by other transit commentators. He has previously written regular columns for several publications, including Spacing magazine, Torontoist, and NOW Magazine.

In 1986, Munro was critical of the decision to build a subway on Sheppard Avenue rather than a light rail vehicle line as professional transit planners recommended.

In 2005, Munro was recognized for his long advocacy for improved public transit with the Jane Jacobs Medal.

In 2010, while he was serving as a member of an advisory board on a proposed transit museum, Munro went public with complaints that the outgoing members of the Toronto Transit Commission were inappropriately rushing to solidify plans for the museum to bolster their personal legacies.

In 2015, Munro conducted a detailed analysis of wait times on the Harbourfront route, following reconstruction of the street that took several years. He found that changes to the route had increased the time to transit the route by 25 percent. In citing Munro's analysis, Edward Keenan of the Toronto Star referred to Munro's website as his "highly detailed blog". Keenan said that Munro's analysis attributed the delay to additional traffic lights, and poorly implemented and ineffective transit prioritization at those traffic lights.

As of 2024, Munro continues to publish commentary and in-depth analysis on his blog, stevemunro.ca.
