= Exhibition Loop =

Toronto Transit Commission streetcar terminus

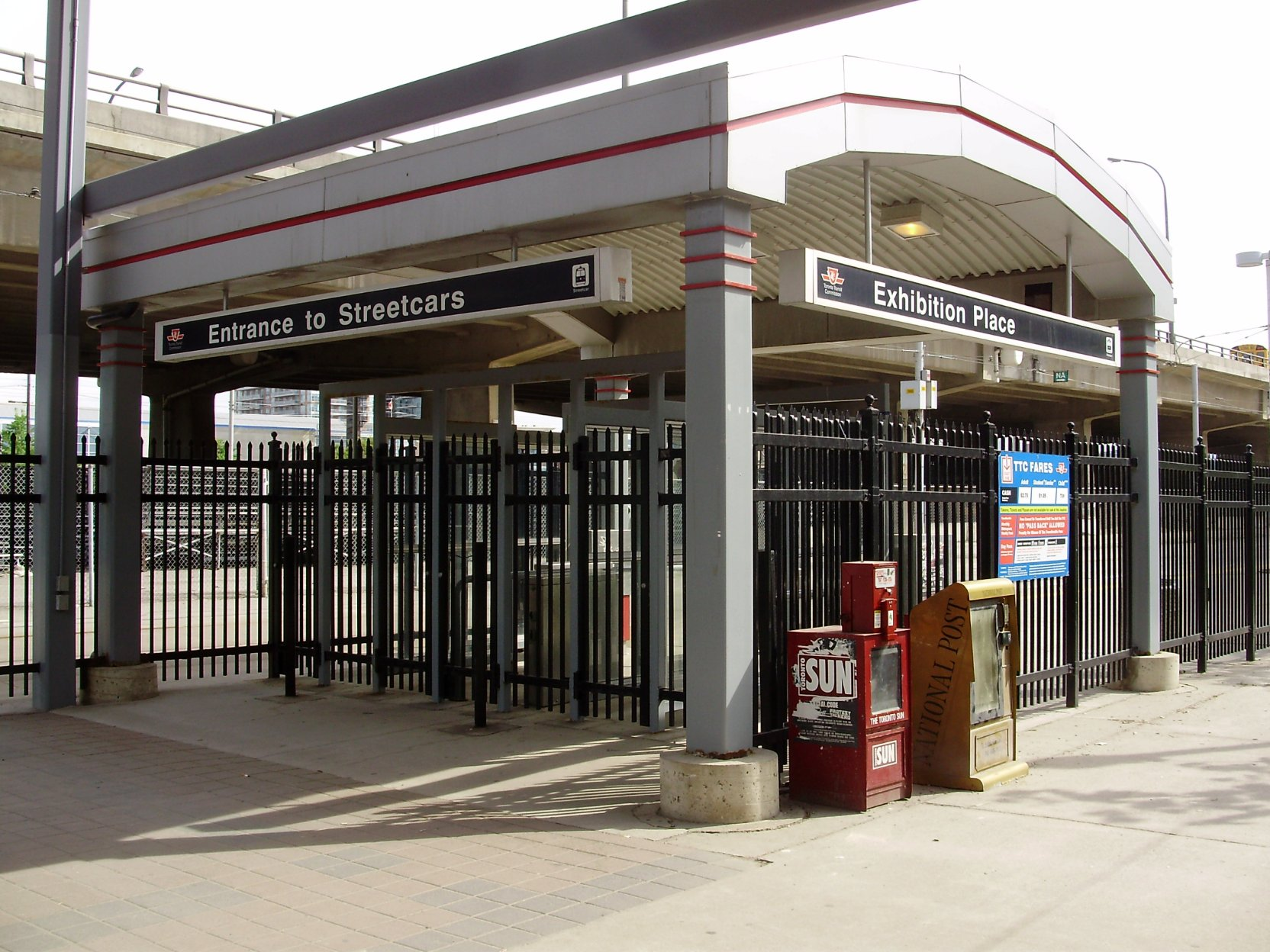

General information
- Location: Manitoba Drive; Toronto, Ontario; Canada
- Coordinates: 43°38′10″N 79°24′59″W
- Platforms: Side
- Connections: at Exhibition GO Station

Construction
- Structure type: At grade

History
- Opened: 1916
- Rebuilt: 1923, 1996

Services
Preceding station	Toronto Transit Commission	Following station
Terminus	509 Harbourfront	Strachan Avenue towards Union
Terminus	511 Bathurst	Strachan Avenue towards Bathurst
Location

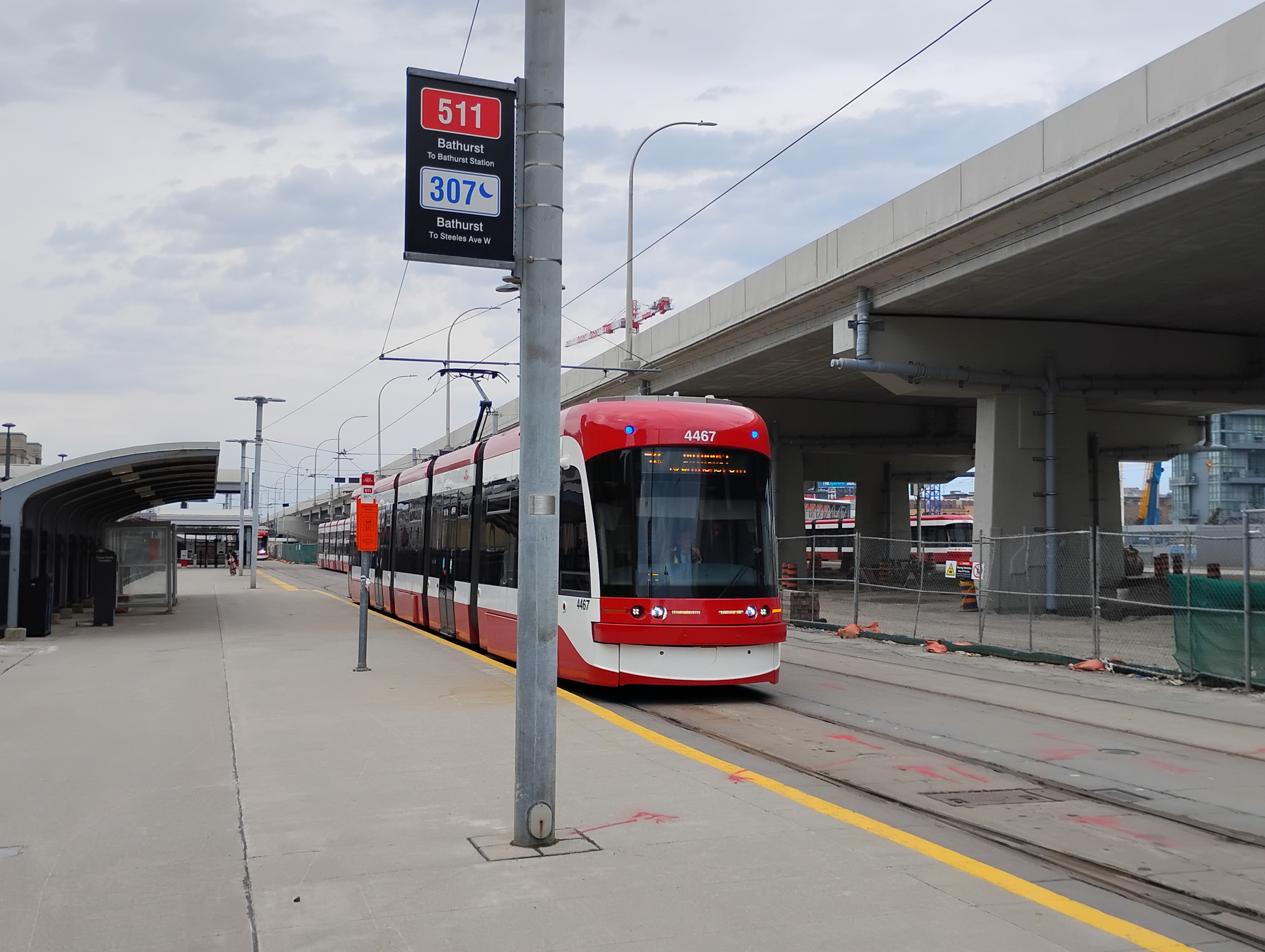
A 511 Bathurst streetcar at Exhibition Loop

Exhibition Loop is the terminus for the 509 Harbourfront and 511 Bathurst streetcar routes, the 174 Ontario Place-Exhibition, and the 307 Blue Night Bathurst bus routes. Exhibition Loop serves Exhibition Place, Coca-Cola Coliseum, BMO Field and connects with GO Transit at the Exhibition GO Station.

== Description ==
Exhibition Loop is located on the north side of Manitoba Drive, near Exhibition GO Station, under the Gardiner Expressway. Streetcar platforms are located on the south side of the loop, which can support unloading passengers at one platform while loading at another. The platform area can operate as a fare-paid zone. The loop has streetcar storage capacity to handle large crowds after a major event.

== History ==
=== Infrastructure ===
Today's Exhibition Loop was the third to serve Exhibition Place with streetcars arriving from Bathurst Street.

The first Exhibition Loop opened on August 25, 1916; streetcars connected to the loop between Bathurst Street and Strachan Avenue by passing through Fort York. By August 20, 1923, the loop facility was modified to an inner-outer loop configuration, whereby streetcars could enter either the inner or outer loop upon arrival. If entering the inner loop, the streetcar could make one lap around before being forced onto the outer loop. Streetcars on the outer loop could not access the inner loop. In 1931, access to Exhibition Loop from Bathurst Street was shifted to Fleet Street instead of via Fort York.

On July 31, 1933, the second Exhibition Loop opened at the site of today's Enercare Centre. The second Exhibition Loop provided more streetcar storage capacity to handle CNE crowds. By July 15, 1982, a double crossover was added to the loop. Also by this date, the Fleet Loop had been modified to allow streetcars from Exhibition Loop to turn back. Thus, after a streetcar discharged passengers at Exhibition Loop, it could go to the loop's storage tracks after turning at Fleet Loop.

The second loop was closed to build the National Trade Centre (today's Enercare Centre) on its site. It was replaced by the current loop which opened on June 11, 1996. When it opened, the current loop was designed to store 16 Articulated Light Rail Vehicles and 30 buses. On busy days, the loop was expected to handle 60,000 customer trips per day with 6,500 trips at the peak hour. The loop cost about $12.3 million to build.

=== Service ===
Initially from 1916, streetcar service to Exhibition Loop was operated during the Canadian National Exhibition (CNE) season or for special events at Exhibition Place. On June 22, 1931, after replacing the Fort York tracks with tracks on Fleet Street, the Toronto Transportation Commission started the "Fleet" streetcar route (renamed to "Fort" after one month). The Fort route initially ran from Wolseley Loop via Bathurst Street and Fleet Street to Fleet Loop. During World War II, the Fort route was extended to Exhibition Loop to serve military personnel billeted at Exhibition Place (which had formerly been part of the grounds of New Fort York). On February 26, 1966, the Bloor–Danforth subway (today Line 2 Bloor–Danforth) opened, and the Fort route was replaced by the Bathurst streetcar (today's 511 Bathurst) running south from Bathurst station to Exhibition Loop.

On July 21, 2000, a second streetcar route, 509 Harbourfront, started to serve Exhibition Loop running from Union station via Queens Quay. It shares the tracks on Fleet Street with 511 Bathurst.

The last seasonal streetcar route to serve the CNE at Exhibition Loop was the 521 Exhibition East. The 521 route was to be discontinued after the 1999 CNE due to declining CNE attendance and the upcoming opening of the 509 Harbourfront route. However, the last 521 runs were during the 2013 CNE season when the 509 route was shut down for track repairs. At that time, the 521 route ran from an on-street loop near Church and King streets, via King to Bathurst Street, Fleet Street and Exhibition Loop.

== Future ==
In April 2019, the City of Toronto decided to proceed with procurement and construction for a streetcar connection between Exhibition Loop and Dufferin Gate Loop to serve as the first part of a future Waterfront West LRT (a proposed streetcar route). At Exhibition Loop, the TTC proposed to:

- Change the direction of the inner siding on the south side of the present loop from eastbound to westbound.
- Build a new westbound track to run diagonally from the north side of the loop to its south side.
- Build new tracks at the south-west side of the loop, extending westward to Dufferin Street and then north to Dufferin Gate Loop.

== Bus connections ==
The following bus routes serve or pass by Exhibition Loop:

- 29C Dufferin between Wilson station and Princes' Gates
- 307 Bathurst (Blue Night) to Steeles Avenue

== See also ==
- Toronto streetcar system loops
