= St. Andrew station =

Toronto subway station

St. Andrew
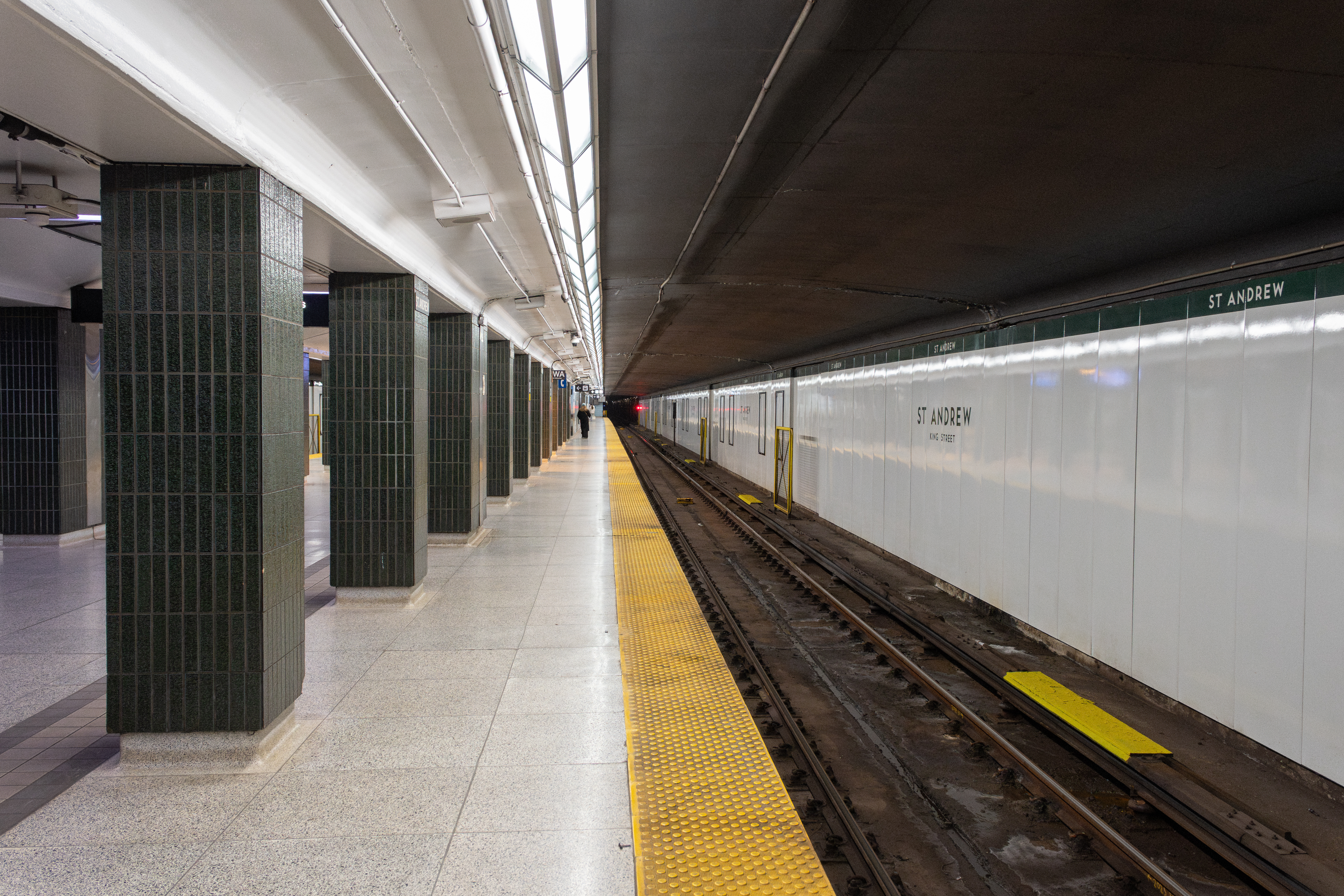

General information
- Location: 173 King Street West, Toronto, Ontario; Canada
- Coordinates: 43°38′52″N 79°23′06″W
- Platforms: Centre platform
- Tracks: 2
- Connections: TTC buses and Streetcars: 304 King; 503 Kingston Rd; 504 King; 508 Lake Shore

Construction
- Structure type: Underground
- Accessible: Yes

Other information
- Website: Official station page

History
- Opened: February 28, 1963; 63 years ago
- Rebuilt: 2009–2010, 2012

Passengers
- 2023–2024: 34,576
- Rank: 14 of 70

Services
Preceding station	Toronto Transit Commission	Following station
Osgoode towards Vaughan	Line 1 Yonge–University	Union towards Finch
Location

St. Andrew is a subway station on Line 1 Yonge–University in Toronto, Ontario, Canada. It is located under University Avenue where it is intersected by King Street West. The station, which opened in 1963, is named for the nearby St. Andrew's Presbyterian Church.

== History ==
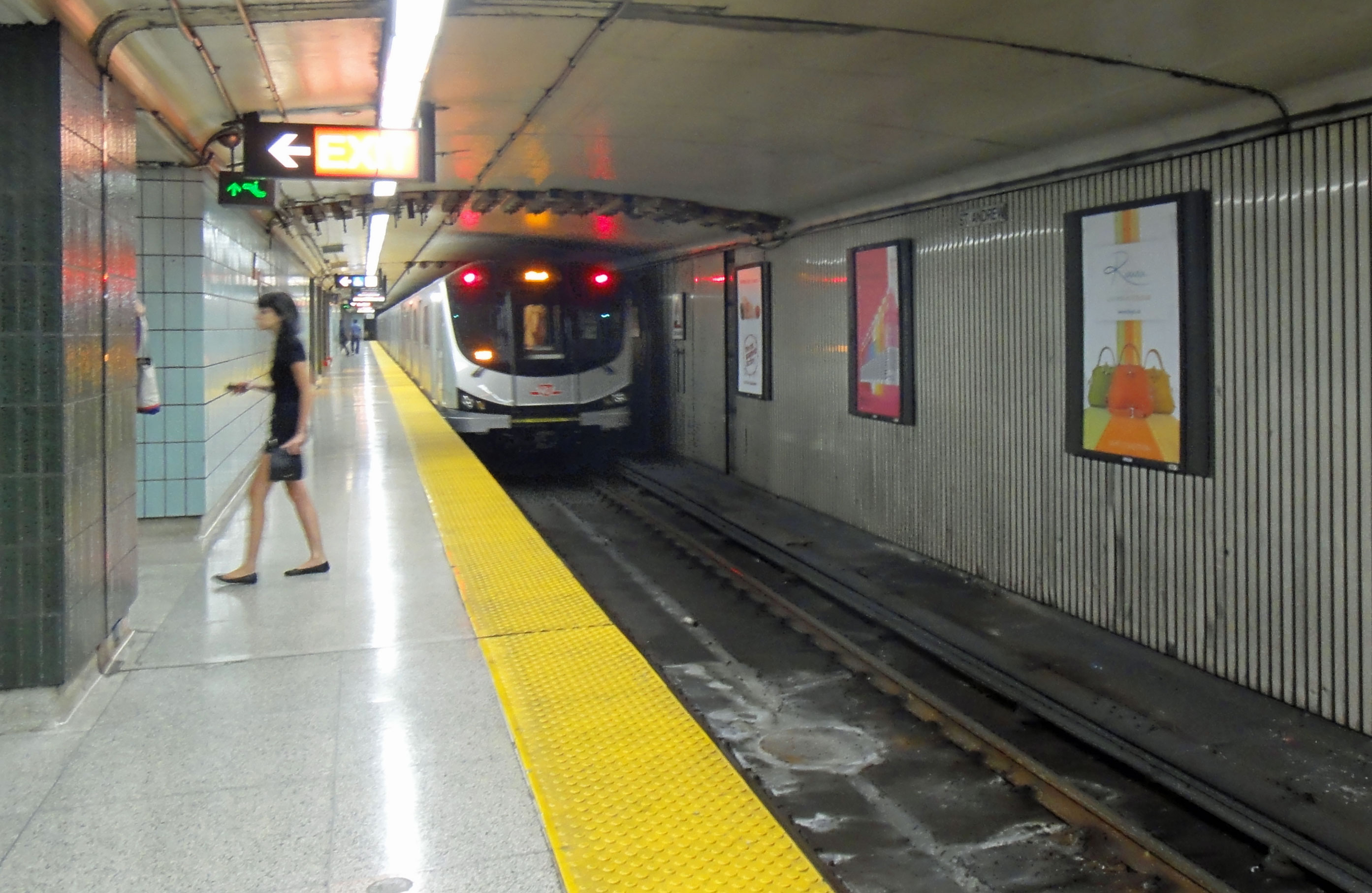
The previous 1970s wall slats and ceramic platform tiles, which replaced the original 1963 vitrolite tiles

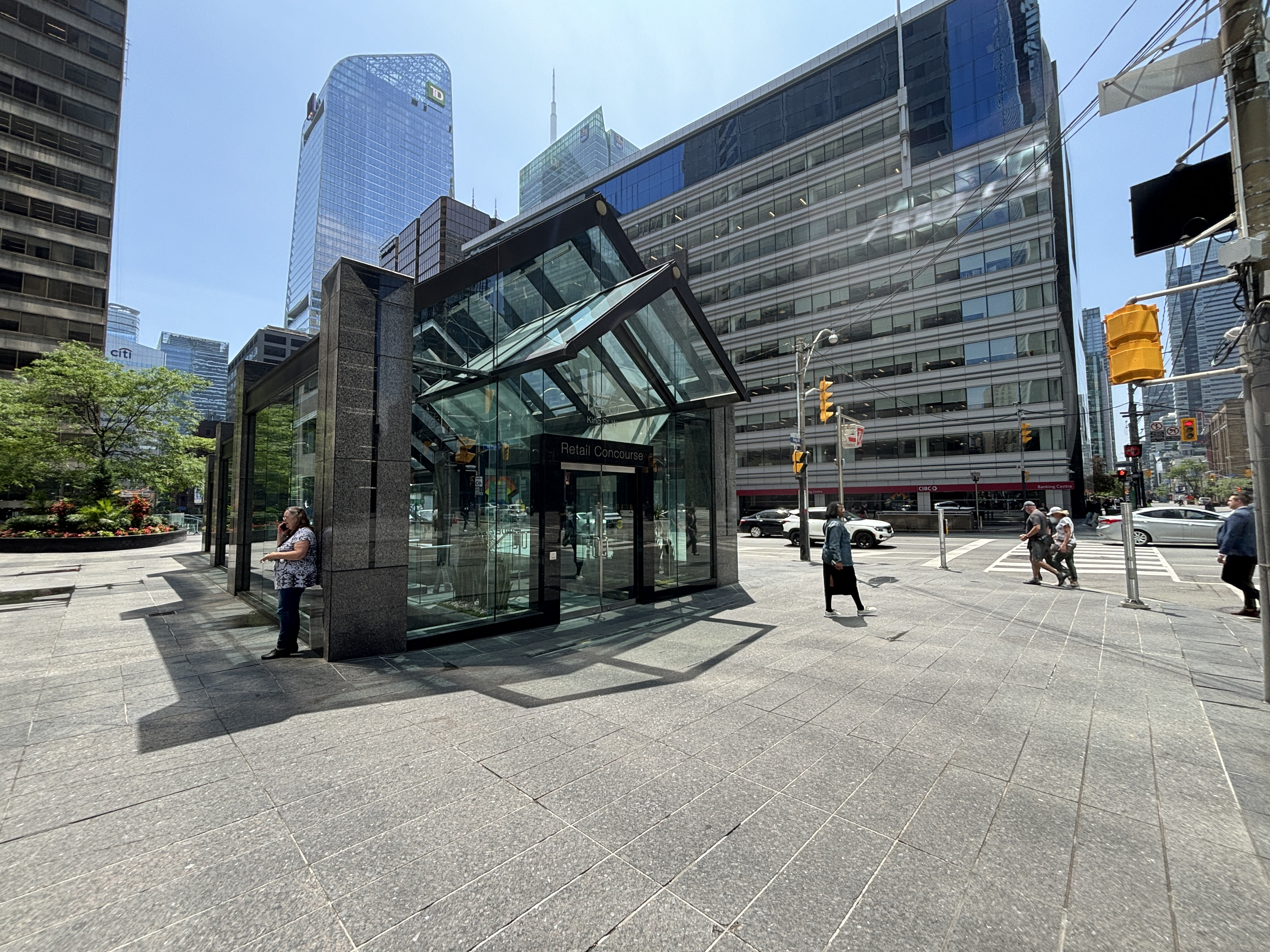
Accessible station entrance at the southeast corner of King and University

Starting in 2008, several minor improvements to the station were implemented. A trial installation of LED lights at the south end of the platform was being used to study their effectiveness in the system. The decision to keep them was made in September 2009, and permanent installation began in February 2011.

Removal of the metal slat wall cover treatment began in 2009. In June 2009, the installation of a new wall treatment began. The new treatment consisted of enamel-coated sheet metal that was white with dark green trim and lettering. On March 25, 2010, the panels were replaced with new versions that showed less buckling; however, the buckling issue was not totally resolved and a new stronger version was being developed.

The station was converted to full wheelchair accessibility by adding a new elevator inside the station from the mezzanine level to the subway platform, and upgrading an elevator in a nearby office complex at 145 King St West to provide access from street level to the mezzanine. The project started in 2010 and the elevators went into service in June 2012.

== Subway infrastructure in the vicinity ==
South of the station the line curves 90 degrees east to run under Front Street to Union station.

== Nearby landmarks ==
The station is near the Entertainment District, including Roy Thomson Hall, Royal Alexandra Theatre, Princess of Wales Theatre and TIFF Lightbox, the home of the Toronto International Film Festival. Also nearby is the Financial District and the Toronto Stock Exchange, with access east of the station via the Path pedestrian tunnel system to Sun Life Centre, Exchange Tower, First Canadian Place, Standard Life Centre, and Toronto-Dominion Centre. Destinations west of the station, also available via Path, include Metro Hall, Canadian Broadcasting Centre, RBC Centre, Ritz-Carlton Toronto and Simcoe Place, and continuing further to the Metro Toronto Convention Centre on the south side of Front Street.

== Surface connections ==
A transfer is required to connect between the subway and these surface TTC streetcar routes:

TTC routes serving the station include:

Route	Name	Additional information
304	King	Streetcar; Blue Night service; eastbound to Broadview station and westbound to Dundas West station
503	Kingston Road	Streetcar; eastbound to Victoria Park Avenue via Queen Street and westbound to King Street and Spadina Avenue
504A	King	Streetcar; westbound to Dundas West station and eastbound to Distillery Loop
504B	King	Streetcar; eastbound to Broadview station and westbound to Dufferin Gate Loop
508	Lake Shore	Streetcar; rush-hour service only; eastbound to Broadview station and westbound to Long Branch Loop
