= 511 Bathurst =

Streetcar route in Toronto, Canada

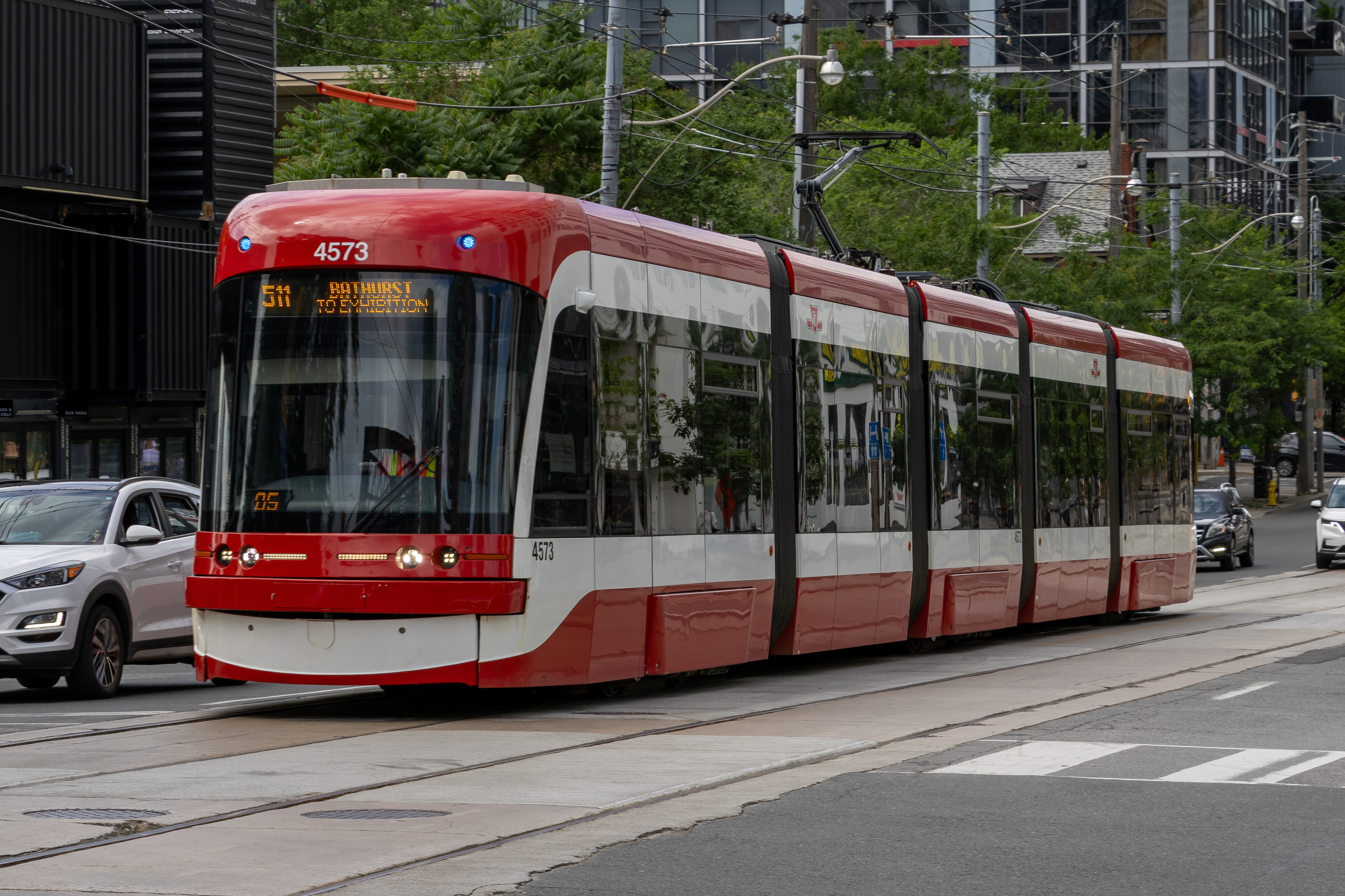
- A 511 Bathurst streetcar at Front Street

Overview
- Locale: Toronto, Ontario
- Termini: Bathurst (north); Exhibition Loop (south)
- Website: Official route page

Service
- Type: Streetcar route
- System: Toronto streetcar system
- Route number: 511
- Operator: Toronto Transit Commission
- Depot(s): Leslie Barns, Russell Carhouse
- Rolling stock: Flexity Outlook
- Daily ridership: 17,500 (2025, weekdays)

History
- Opened: 1885; 141 years ago

Technical
- Line length: 5.3 km (3.29 mi)
- Track gauge: 4 ft 10 7/8 in (1,495 mm)
- Electrification: 600 V DC overhead

A map of the 511 Bathurst route along with connecting services.

The 511 Bathurst is a Toronto streetcar route operated by the Toronto Transit Commission in Ontario, Canada. Before 1980, it carried no number, only a route name.

== Route ==
The 511 Bathurst operates between Bathurst station and Exhibition Loop north–south along Bathurst Street, using painted transit-only lanes, and east–west along Fleet Street in a dedicated streetcar right-of-way shared with route 509 Harbourfront.

Late at night, the 511 Bathurst is replaced by the 307 Bathurst Blue Night bus, which also includes the route of the 7 Bathurst bus route, operating from Exhibition Loop to the city limits at Steeles Avenue.

Route 511 was once primarily operated with shorter CLRVs. However, during special events at Exhibition Place, such as the Canadian National Exhibition (CNE), additional service was provided using larger ALRVs and, since 2015, Flexity Outlook streetcars.

== History ==
Streetcar service on Bathurst Street started on July 27, 1885, when the Toronto Street Railway opened a horsecar line between Bloor Street and College Street. The line was extended to King Street in December 1889, and to Front Street on September 5, 1892. The Toronto Railway Company electrified the line on April 19, 1894, and extended it north to Dupont Street on July 10, 1894. The railway corridor south of Front Street remained a barrier until August 25, 1916, when a bridge was constructed at a southwest angle over the railway tracks. South of the rail corridor, streetcars ran along the edge of Fort York to provide seasonal service to Exhibition Place.

On December 21, 1921, the Toronto Transportation Commission extended the line to St. Clair Avenue. In 1931, the bridge over the railway corridor south of Front Street was realigned in a north–south alignment. On June 22, 1931, streetcar service started on Fleet Street, which became part of the "Fort" route.

Just prior to the opening of Line 2 Bloor–Danforth on February 25, 1966, Bathurst Street was served by two streetcar routes, Fort and Bathurst. The Fort route ran from Vaughan Loop (an on-street loop using Vaughan Road and St. Clair Avenue) to Exhibition Loop. The Bathurst route ran south from Vaughan Loop to Adelaide Street turning east on that street, then south on Church Street, west on King Street to return north on Bathurst Street. However, before the city converted Adelaide Street to a one-way, eastbound street in 1960, Bathurst streetcars would loop downtown north from Adelaide Street on Church Street, west on Richmond Street, south on York Street to return westbound on Adelaide Street.

With the Line 2 Bloor–Danforth opening, service north of Bloor Street to Vaughan Loop was discontinued, with cars terminating at the then-new Bathurst station. Service north of Bloor was replaced with the 7 Bathurst bus, although the tracks there remain today for non-revenue use to connect the St. Clair streetcar line and the Hillcrest Complex to the rest of the streetcar network. Bathurst streetcar service along Adelaide Street was also terminated, with the tracks being ultimately abandoned with the exception of one track between Victoria and Church streets. The Fort and Bathurst routes were merged, and the "Fort" name was discontinued. With these changes, the Bathurst route resembled today's 511 Bathurst.

Around early 1978, the TTC announced plans to number all of its streetcar routes (which had been known only by names), and the Bathurst route was to be number 508. However, by the time that route numbers actually began being displayed on the destination signs of the TTC's PCC streetcars, on February 4, 1980, the Bathurst route's assigned number had been changed to 511. The route was still operated using only PCC streetcars at that time, so this date was the first use of a route number on the Bathurst route.

In June 1995, the old Exhibition Loop at the site of today's Trade Centre was closed, and a new loop was opened next to Exhibition GO station on June 16, 1996.

On July 21, 2000, the 509 Harbourfront route shared tracks with 511 Bathurst from Bathurst Street west to Exhibition Loop.

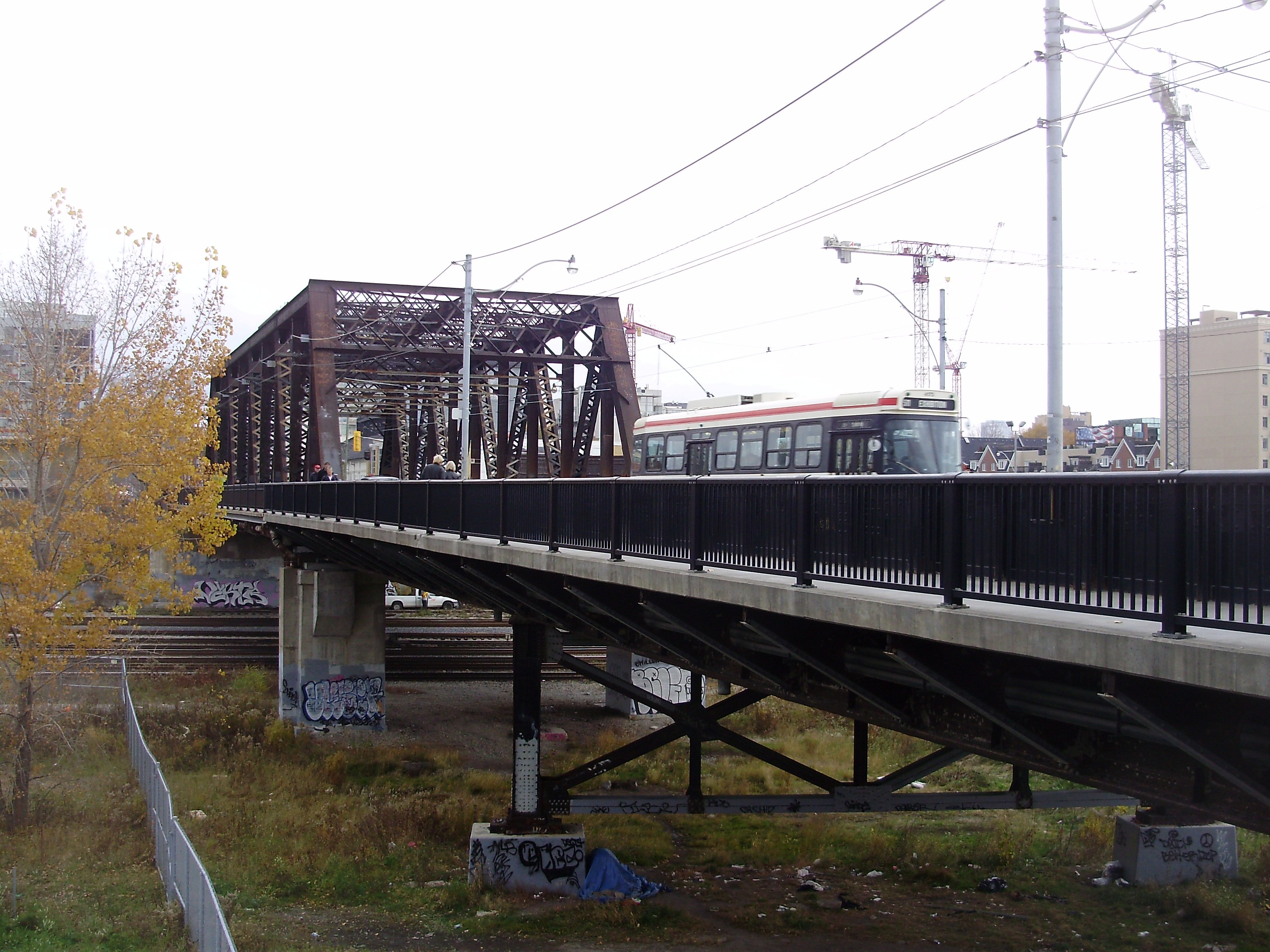
A CLRV streetcar travels south on Bathurst on the Sir Isaac Brock Bridge above the Union Station Rail Corridor in 2008.

Between September 2007 and March 2008, the tracks along Fleet Street were rebuilt in a private right-of-way. Also, during this time, the overhead wire was rebuilt to allow for subsequent pantograph operation along Fleet Street, the first location to be so equipped.

Starting in 2015, the TTC introduced summer service using Flexity Outlook streetcars to handle events such as the 2015 Pan American Games at the "CIBC Pan Am / Parapan Am Park" and the Canadian National Exhibition.

Due to a streetcar shortage caused by late delivery of the Bombardier Flexity Outlook streetcars, the route was operated using buses rather than streetcars since November 20, 2016. TTC streetcar service on 511 Bathurst returned from May 7, 2017, until September 4, 2017, when the 511 Bathurst route reverted to replacement bus service due to an ongoing streetcar shortage.

On February 18, 2018, streetcars returned to the route, followed by another period of bus replacement that began on September 2, 2018. On June 23, 2019, streetcars returned to 511 Bathurst, ending the temporary replacement bus service. It operated using a mixture of both CLRVs and Flexities until December 28, 2019, the last day for CLRVs on this route. The 511 Bathurst route was the last route in Toronto to run CLRVs seven days per week.

From April 20, 2020, until January 3, 2021, buses temporarily replaced streetcars on 511 Bathurst in order to accommodate several TTC and City of Toronto construction projects. Regular streetcar service resumed on the 511 Bathurst route on January 4, 2021.

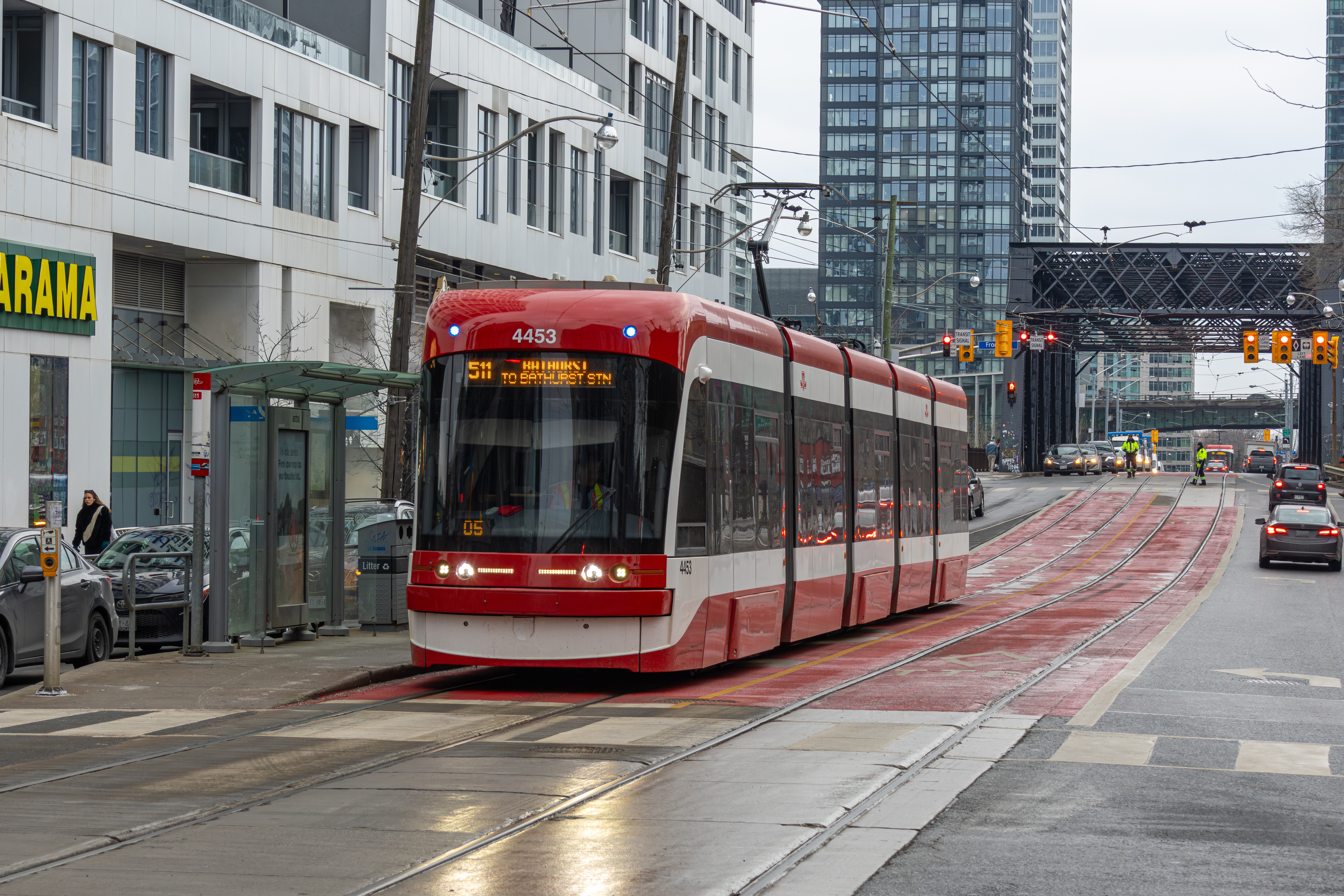
A 511 streetcar using newly installed priority lanes near Niagara Street in December 2025

In November 2025, work started to reserve the centre lanes along Bathurst Street between Bathurst station and Lakeshore Boulevard West for the exclusive use of streetcars. Along this 3.4-kilometre (2.1 mi) stretch, the centre lanes are to be painted red and all on-street parking will be prohibited. This work was given priority to support the 2026 FIFA World Cup by improving the service reliability of the 511 streetcar. This work was part of a plan called RapidTO, which also encompassed reserved lanes painted red for certain bus routes.
