= 504 King =

Streetcar route in Toronto, Canada

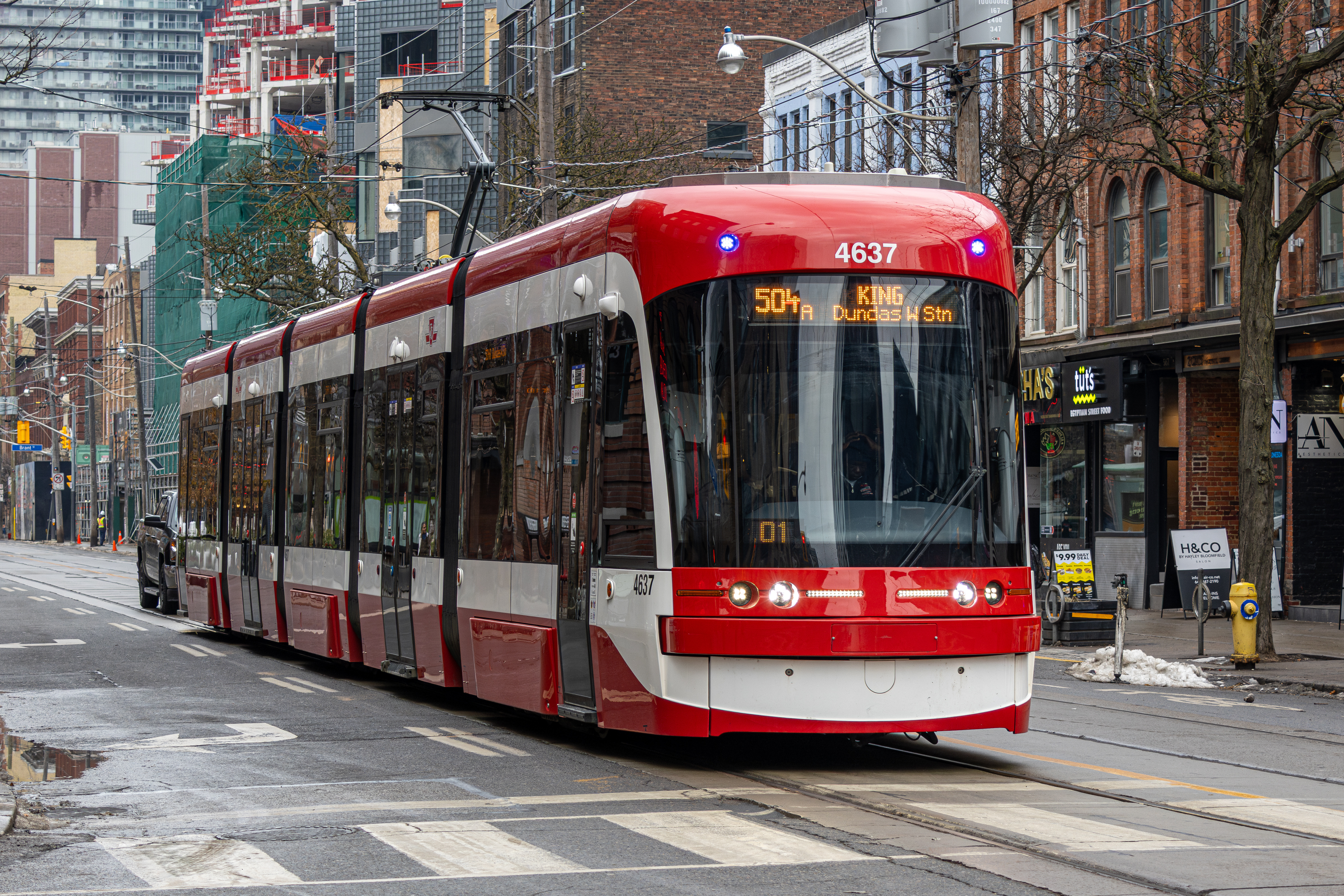
- A streetcar on route 504A King

Overview
- Locale: Toronto, Ontario
- Termini: Dundas West station (west; 504A); Dufferin Gate Loop (west; 504B); Distillery Loop (east; 504A); Broadview station (east; 504B)
- Stations: Dundas West station (504A); St. Andrew station; King station; Broadview station (504B)
- Website: Official route page

Service
- Type: Streetcar route
- System: Toronto streetcar system
- Route number: 504 (304 overnight)
- Operator: Toronto Transit Commission
- Depot(s): Leslie Barns, Russell Carhouse
- Rolling stock: Flexity Outlook
- Daily ridership: 58,900 (2025, weekdays)

History
- Opened: 1923; 103 years ago

Technical
- Line length: 504A: 10.4 km (6.46 mi); 504B: 9.6 km (5.97 mi); 304: 12.9 km (8.02 mi)
- Track gauge: 4 ft 10 7/8 in (1,495 mm)
- Electrification: 600 V DC overhead
Route map
504A
504B

504 King (304 King during overnight periods) is an east–west Toronto streetcar route in Ontario, Canada. It serves King Street in Downtown Toronto as well as Broadview Avenue on the east end and Roncesvalles Avenue on the west end of the line. The route consists of two overlapping branches: 504A between Line 2 Bloor–Danforth's Dundas West station and Distillery Loop, and 504B between Broadview station – also on Line 2 – and Dufferin Gate Loop. The two branches overlap on King Street between Dufferin and Sumach streets, both passing St. Andrew station and King station on subway Line 1 Yonge–University.

In 2022, with almost 13.5 million annual boardings, 504 King was the busiest streetcar line in Toronto. (In 2019, prior to the drop in ridership due to the COVID-19 pandemic, there were almost 29.7 million annual boardings.)

== Route ==
The 504 King route operates as two overlapping branches:

- 504A King streetcars operate from Dundas West station to Distillery Loop, travelling south on Dundas Street West and Roncesvalles Avenue, east on King Street West and East, and south on Cherry Street to Distillery Loop.
- 504B King streetcars operate from Dufferin Gate Loop to Broadview station, travelling north on Dufferin Street, east on King Street West and East, east on Queen Street East, and north on Broadview Avenue to Broadview station.

In the west, route 504A King starts at Dundas West station on Line 2 Bloor–Danforth. From there, the route goes a short distance south of Bloor Street along Dundas Street West to Roncesvalles Avenue, where it continues farther south on Roncesvalles Avenue, crossing Howard Park Avenue and route 506 Carlton. 504A King passes the Roncesvalles Carhouse as it approaches Queen Street West and the Queensway.

South of Queen Street West and the Queensway, the route turns east along King Street. At Dufferin Street, 504B streetcars from Dufferin Gate Loop merge with 504A streetcars to provide a combined service along King Street to Sumach Street. Continuing further east to Bathurst Street, the 504 enters a transit mall where automobiles have restrictions so as not to impede streetcar service. Continuing eastward past Spadina Avenue, the 504 route passes St. Andrew station at University Avenue and King station at Yonge Street, both on Line 1 Yonge–University. At Jarvis Street, the transit mall ends and routes 504A and 504B continue to Sumach Street, where route 504A turns south on Cherry Street to proceed to Distillery Loop. Route 504B continues on King Street, as the street bends northeast to merge with Queen Street East, then crosses the Queen Street Viaduct and the Don River to arrive at Broadview Avenue.

Route 504B turns north on Broadview Avenue. Continuing on Broadview Avenue, route 504B eventually crosses Danforth Avenue arriving at Broadview station on Line 2 Bloor–Danforth.

=== King Street Transit Priority Corridor ===
Route 504 King passes through the King Street Transit Priority Corridor, a transit mall located between Bathurst Street and Jarvis Street. Within the mall, there are restrictions on road traffic to prevent the obstruction of transit vehicles. Trucks and cars may enter the traffic mall, but must leave at the next intersection by turning right – with a few exceptions; left turns within the transit mall are not allowed.

=== Roncesvalles Avenue ===
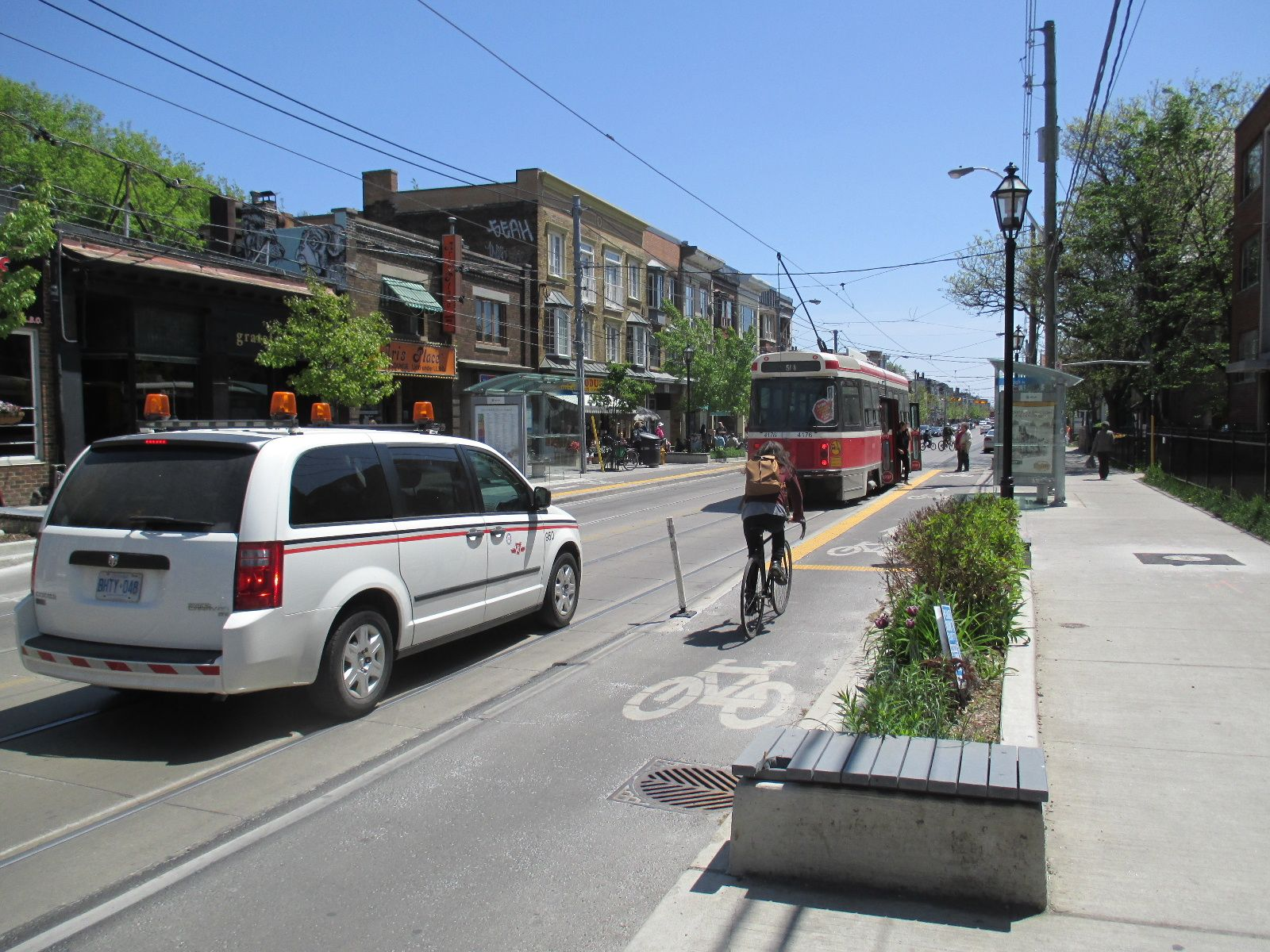
Bumpout on Roncesvalles Avenue serving as both a streetcar loading platform as well as a bicycle lane

Between 2009 and 2011, Roncesvalles Avenue was rebuilt to a new design, which included the addition of bike lanes and a widened sidewalk "bumpout" at stops to allow riders to board streetcars directly from the curb. In these sections, the bike lane gently rises from the main road to run on top of the bumpout; when a streetcar is stopped at a bumpout, cyclists are required to stop and allow riders to board or alight from the vehicle. However, the platform height at the bumpouts was incompatible with the accessibility ramp on the low-floor Flexity Outlook streetcars that were introduced in 2018 on the 504 King route. Thus, no stops along Roncesvalles Avenue between Queen Street and Dundas Street West were accessible. In 2023, the platform heights were raised so the Flexity streetcar accessibility ramps could be deployed at those stops.

== History ==
On July 1, 1923, as part of a reorganization of streetcar routes, the King streetcar route acquired its current U-shape. The west end of the line was at the Vincent Loop, located near the northeast corner of Dundas Street West and Bloor Street West, across the street from today's Dundas West station. The east end of the line was at the Erindale Loop, located at the northeast corner of Broadview Avenue and Erindale Avenue, on the north side of today's Broadview station.

From July 1, 1923, to July 13, 1951, some King streetcars provided rush-hour service along Bloor Street West between Dundas Street West and Jane Loop. The TTC ended this service due to declining ridership. Starting July 16, 1951, all King service turned back at Vincent Loop.

On January 8, 1939, PCC streetcars were introduced on the King route on Sundays, displacing Peter Witt streetcars. On September 24, 1940, PCCs replaced Peter Witt cars in base service.

On February 25, 1966, the Bloor–Danforth subway (today Line 2 Bloor–Danforth) opened, and Dundas West station replaced the Vincent Loop, and Broadview station replaced the Erindale Loop. Both new subway stations had, and still have, a streetcar loop within the fare-paid zone. Otherwise, the King streetcar route had changed little since 1923.

Around early 1978, the TTC announced plans to number all of its streetcar routes (which had been known only by names), and the King Street route was to be number 504. The route number 504 began being displayed on streetcars' destination signs on February 4, 1980, when the King route was still operated entirely by PCC streetcars.

In 2006, the TTC briefly considered adding couplers to streetcars to enable operation of streetcars in two or three units, a common practice until the opening of the Bloor–Danforth subway; the expectation was that this would keep them from bunching and becoming stuck in traffic. This plan was rejected in favour of ordering brand-new, longer Flexity Outlook vehicles.

Starting June 19, 2016, a new route – 514 Cherry – was created to supplement 504 King service on King Street between Dufferin and Sumach streets. The 514 route increased capacity along the King Street corridor to address the growing downtown ridership. It also addressed accessibility concerns through its use of the low-floor Flexity Outlook streetcars.

From December 2, 2017, the TTC assigned a minimum of two Flexity Outlook streetcars on 504 King to handle weekday overcrowding, as the King Street Pilot Project improved service performance and made the service more popular.

On January 2, 2018, Flexity Outlook streetcars were introduced on the 504 King route.

On October 7, 2018, 504 King was divided into two overlapping branches with two new termini (Dufferin Gate Loop and Distillery Loop) replacing the 514 Cherry route, which was permanently cancelled on the same date. The 304 King Blue Night service remained unchanged.

By January 6, 2019, the 504 King route was fully served by Flexity Outlook streetcars.

On May 9, 2021, the intersection of King Street, Queen Street, The Queensway and Roncesvalles Avenue (KQQR) closed due to various construction projects in the area such as track replacement, reconfiguration of the KQQR intersection, adjusting the height of streetcar loading platforms along Roncesvalles Avenue and upgrades to water, sewer and electrical infrastructure. Initially, 504A King service was diverted to Dufferin Gate Loop instead of Dundas West station. On October 1, 2022, both branches of the 504 streetcar were diverted to Exhibition Loop to accommodate the replacement of the streetcar junction at King and Shaw Streets. With the completion of work at King and Shaw, 504A streetcars diverted again to Dufferin Gate Loop on December 9, 2022, but with 504B streetcars diverting to Wolseley Loop.

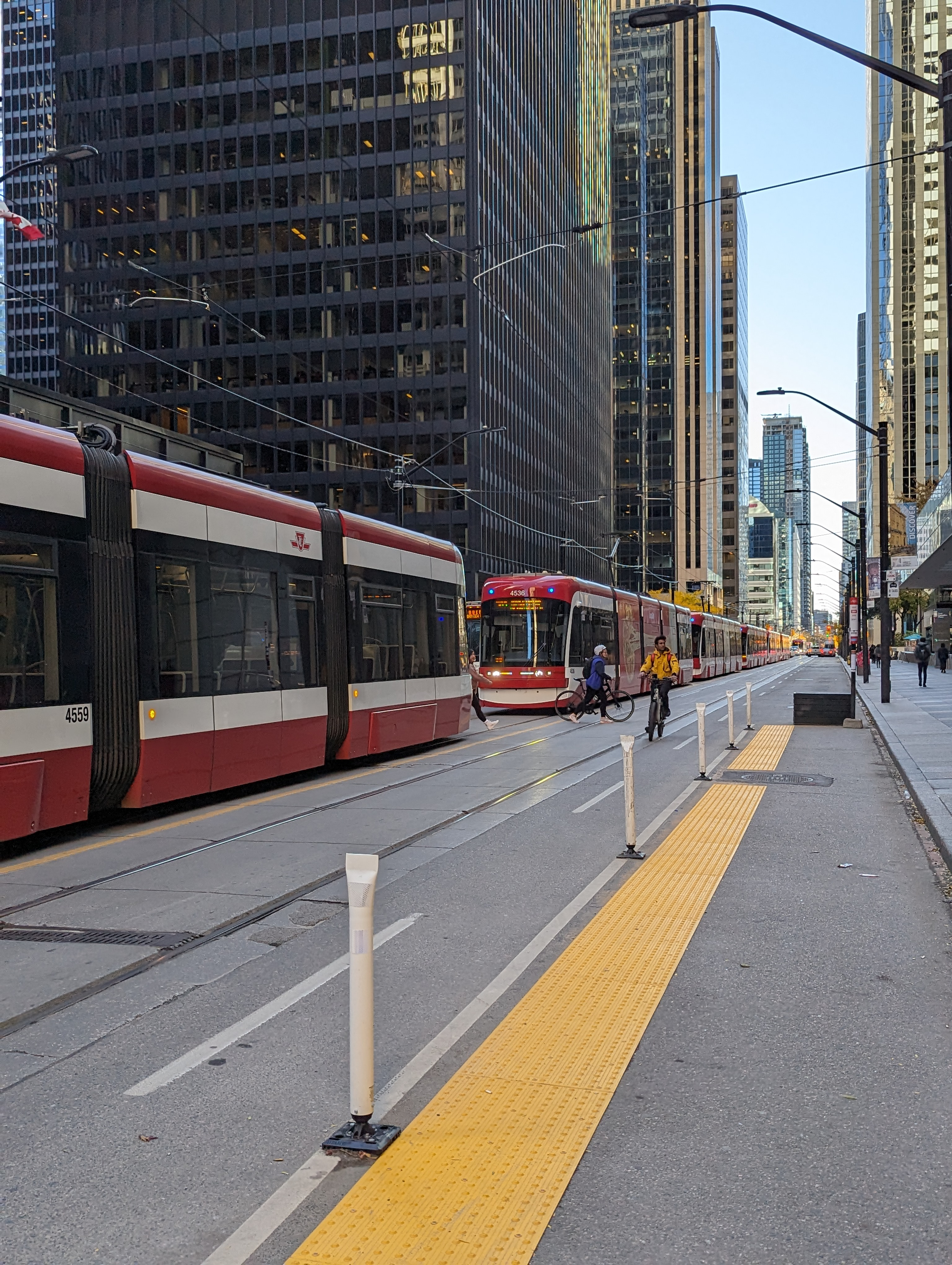
504 King streetcars at a halt due to a rally in Toronto

On February 12, 2023, 504 service was cut back to Bathurst Street in order to convert the overhead wire west of Bathurst for pantograph operation; 504A cars were diverted to Exhibition Loop and 504B to Wolseley Loop. On March 26, 2023, the 504 King route diverted to Queen Street between Shaw Street and the Don River to convert the remaining overhead wire on King Street. On May 1, 2023, streetcars returned to King Street, operating between Dufferin Gate loop and Broadview station, after TTC crews worked the previous night to finish the conversion of the overhead for pantograph operation. On May 7, 2023, streetcar service resumed on Roncesvalles Avenue, ending two years of bus replacement on the west end of the 504 King route.

=== Blue Night service ===
From 1987 to 1992, the Blue Night Network included the 304 King route, which provided overnight service along the length of the 504 King daytime route. The 304 route was eliminated in February 1992, with the Broadview and Roncesvalles segments replaced by portions of other Blue Night bus routes; however, King Street remained unserviced directly until September 6, 2015, when the 304 King was restored as part of a $95-million investment from Toronto City Council. Currently, overnight service operate every 30 minutes between Broadview and Dundas West stations via Broadview Avenue, King Street, and Roncesvalles Avenue.

== Sites along the line (from east to west) ==
- East Chinatown
- George Brown College
- St. Lawrence Hall
- Commerce Court
- Scotia Plaza
- Toronto-Dominion Centre
- First Canadian Place
- Royal Alexandra Theatre
- Roy Thomson Hall
- Princess of Wales Theatre
- Metro Hall
