= 509 Harbourfront =

Streetcar route in Toronto, Canada

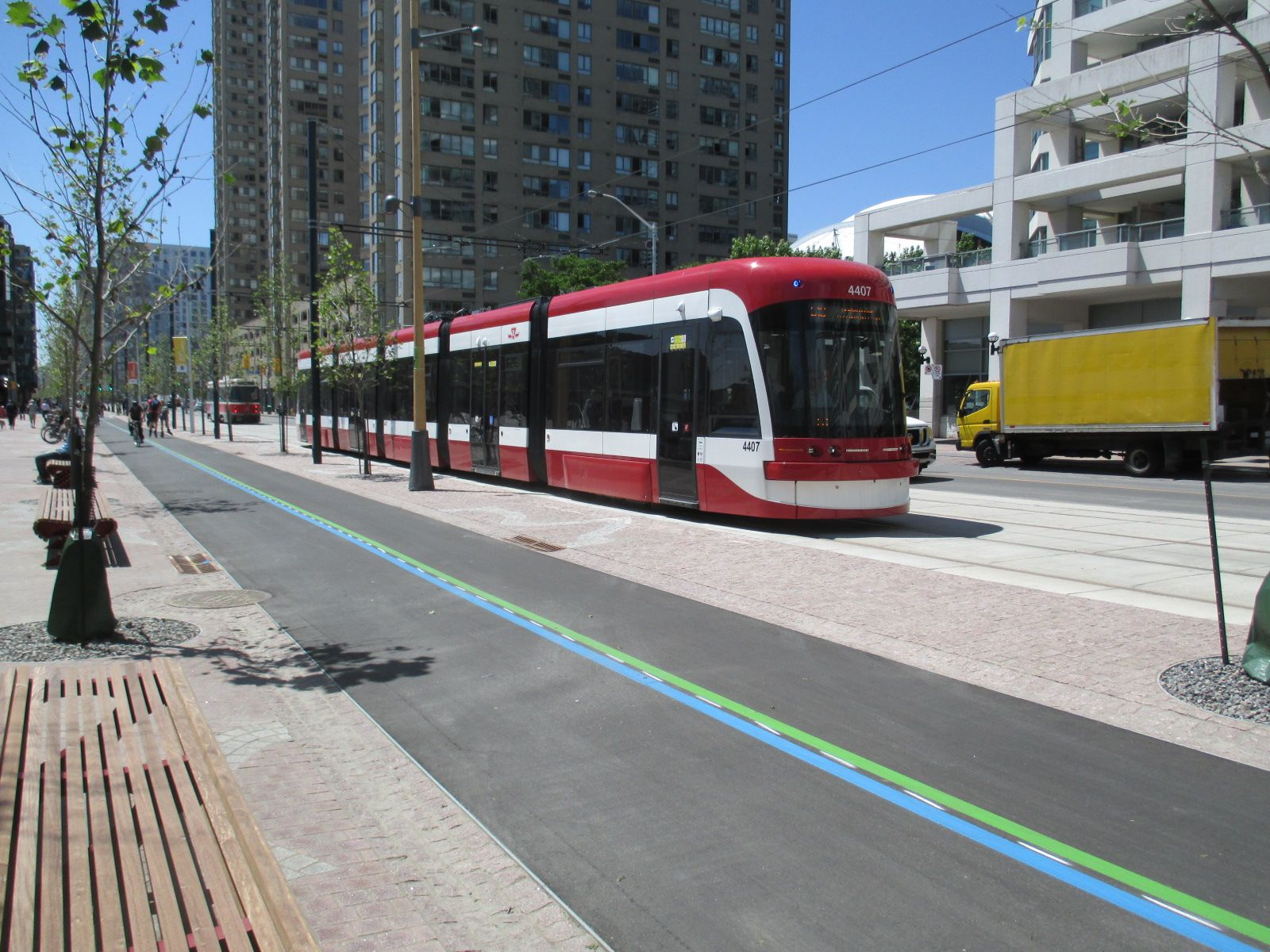
- A Flexity Outlook car on Queens Quay in 2015

Overview
- Status: Operational
- Locale: Toronto, Ontario
- Termini: Exhibition Loop (west); Union station (east)
- Stations: Queens Quay; Union
- Website: Official route page

Service
- Type: Streetcar route
- System: Toronto streetcar system
- Route number: 509
- Operator(s): Toronto Transit Commission
- Depot(s): Leslie Barns
- Rolling stock: Flexity Outlook
- Daily ridership: 10,717 (2022, weekdays)

History
- Opened: 22 June 1990; 34 years ago
- Rebuilt: 2012–2014

Technical
- Line length: 4.4 km (2.73 mi)
- Number of tracks: Double track
- Character: Right-of-way
- Track gauge: 4 ft 10 7/8 in (1,495 mm)
- Electrification: 600 V DC overhead

509 Harbourfront is a Toronto streetcar route in Ontario, Canada, operated by the Toronto Transit Commission and connecting Union Station with Exhibition Loop.

== History ==
=== 1990–2012 ===
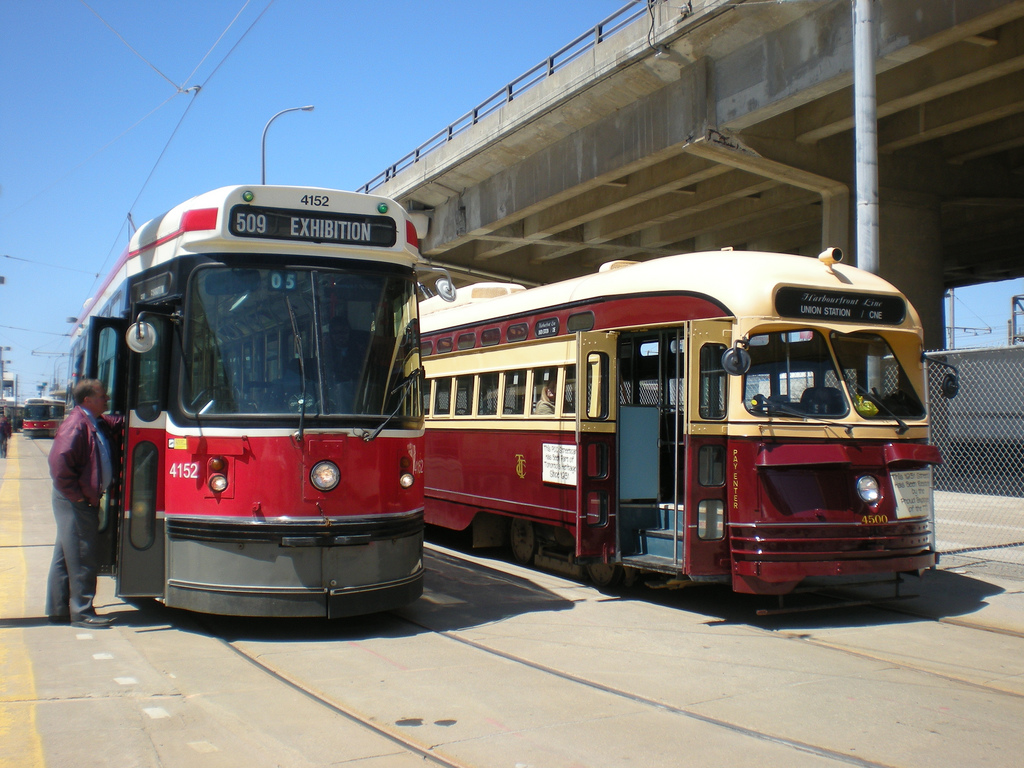
A CLRV car and a PCC car both operating the 509 Harbourfront route in 2009

The 509 Harbourfront began service in 1990 as the "604 Harbourfront" and was referred to as the "Harbourfront LRT". It was the first new Toronto streetcar route in many years, and the first to employ a dedicated tunnel, approximately 600 metres (2,000 ft) long. The route starts with an underground loop at Union station, runs south along Bay Street to the underground Queens Quay station, then turns west and emerges onto Queens Quay. The line's original terminus was Queens Quay and Spadina Loop, at the foot of Spadina Avenue; beyond this point non-revenue track ran north on Spadina to King, to connect the new line with the rest of the network.

Numbers in the 600-series were used at that time within the TTC for rapid transit routes (i.e., subways and the Scarborough RT) rather than single-digit numbers as is the case today, and the Harbourfront LRT was given the number 604 to indicate that it was different from other streetcar routes. The 1990 TTC Ride Guide indicated the route with its own colour like a subway line rather than as a streetcar route. Since the route is not grade-separated, this was later felt to be misleading and it was subsequently treated like other streetcar lines, taking the number 510.

In 1997, the completion of a dedicated right-of-way on Spadina Avenue resulted in the Harbourfront route being relaunched as the 510 Spadina. The "Harbourfront" route name disappeared until 2000, when the Queens Quay streetcar tracks were extended west to Bathurst and Fleet Streets. The Harbourfront name was then combined with the new number 509, and extended to Exhibition Loop at Exhibition Place, sharing its route with the 510 from Union to Spadina and with the 511 Bathurst from Bathurst onwards. Between September 2007 and March 2008, the Fleet Street portion of Route 509 was converted to a parallel private right-of-way, so that the entire route operates entirely separate from road traffic.

=== 2012–present ===
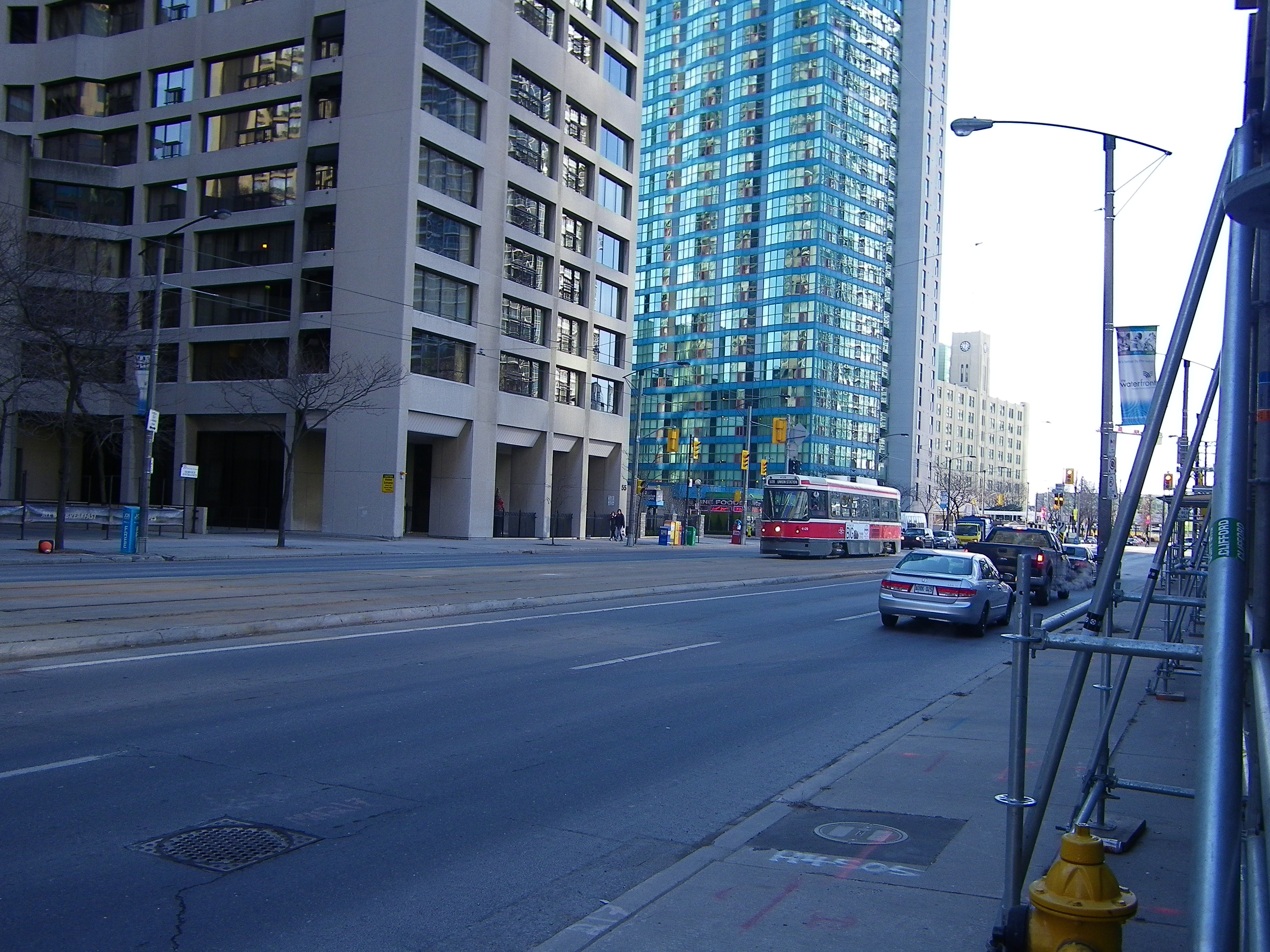
A CLRV car on the former right-of-way in the median of Queens Quay in 2012

In July 2012, Waterfront Toronto began a major reconstruction of Queens Quay West, requiring the 509 streetcar to be replaced with buses for the duration of the construction. On 12 October 2014, streetcar service resumed on 509 Harbourfront route after an absence of over two years in order to rebuild the street to a new design, and to replace tracks. With the new street design, two auto lanes south of the streetcar tracks were eliminated from Spadina Avenue to York Street in order to extend Harbourfront parkland to the edge of the streetcar right-of-way. Thus, streetcars now effectively run on a roadside right-of-way instead of a mid-street median. A bicycle path and rows of trees are located on the immediate south side of the right-of-way.

By August 2016, after the reconstruction of Queens Quay West, the TTC reported that streetcars were taking 40 minutes to make a round trip instead of an expected 34 minutes. The new side-of-road track design results in streetcars encountering more traffic lights, pedestrians and cyclists, the latter two requiring streetcar to operate slowly to avoid collisions. TTC service planner Scott Haskill suggested that "public realm and urban design" drove the Queens Quay redevelopment at the expense of transit planning. However, accidents along Queens Quay are no more frequent than along other streets. Transit advocate Steve Munro analyzed the route's performance for May 2016 and concluded that the extra running time was consumed from Queens Quay Loop to the intersection of Bathurst and Fleet streets, and that the running time east of Spadina Avenue was the same as before the reconstruction because of fixes to traffic signal problems.

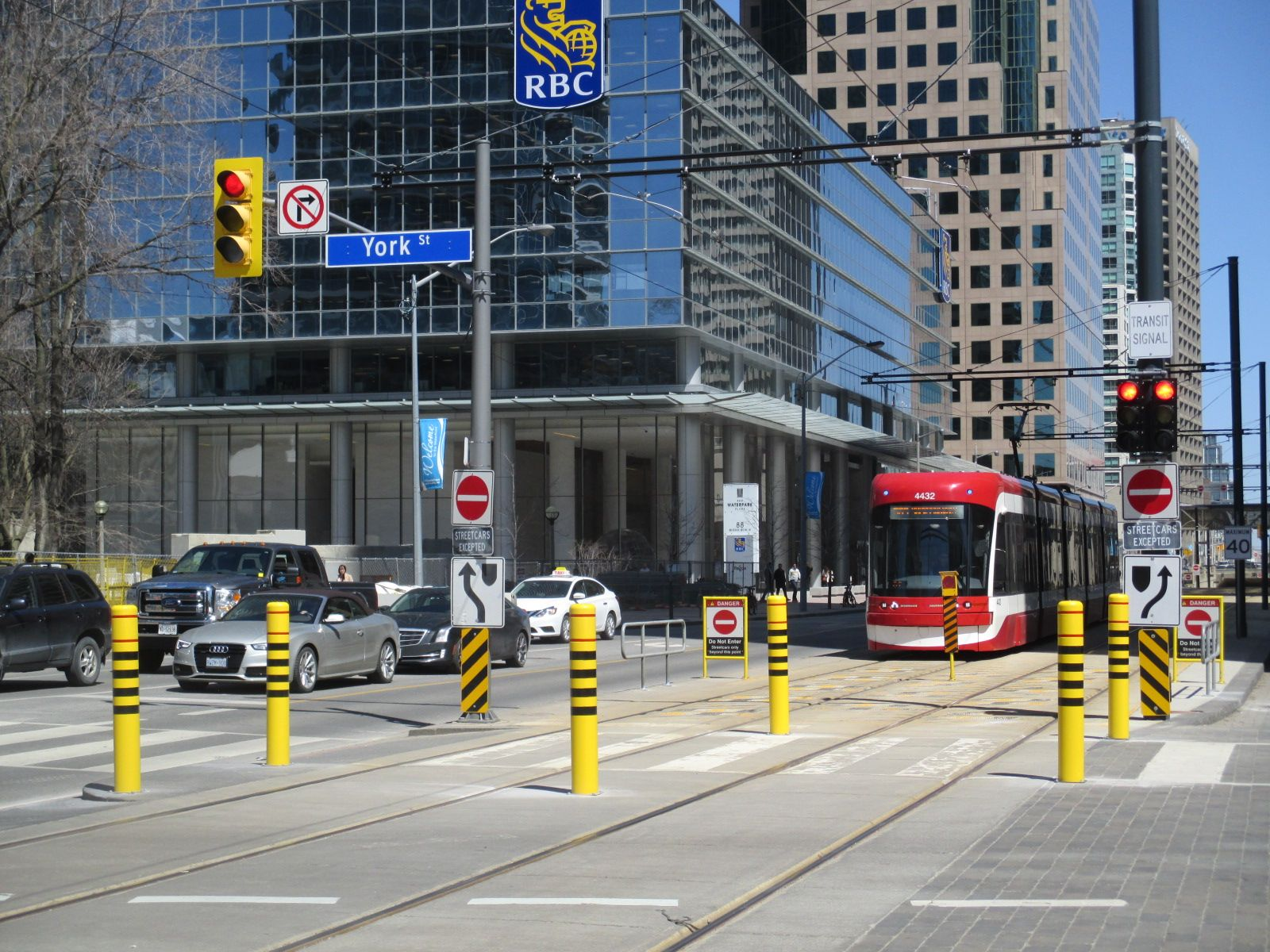
Bollards and signage to discourage automobiles from entering the streetcar tunnel

Between 2014 and January 2020, there were 27 instances of private unauthorized automobiles driving down the ramp of the streetcar tunnel entrance just east of York Street and getting trapped in the tunnel. In a January 2020 incident, a motorist bypassed bollards, flashing lights and gates to become stuck at Union Station. These tunnel intrusions have negatively affected both 509 Harbourfront and 510 Spadina service.

On 12 September 2017, 509 Harbourfront became the first streetcar route in Toronto to operate Flexity streetcars with electrical pickup by pantograph instead of trolley pole. Pending the conversion of the overhead on other streetcar lines, runs to and from the carhouse continue to use trolley poles, with the changeover taking place at Exhibition Loop.

=== Vehicles used ===
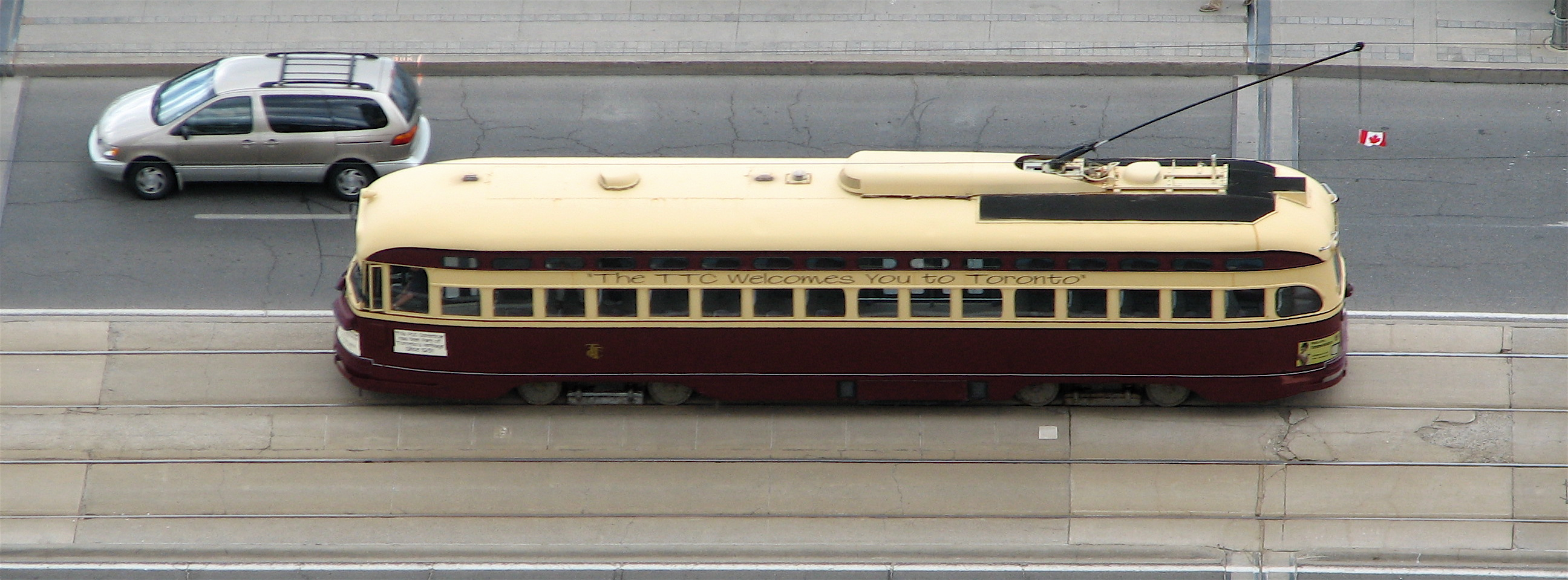
A preserved PCC streetcar on Queens Quay in 2007

The 604 Harbourfront route began operating in 1990 using rebuilt PCC streetcars belonging to the TTC's A-15 PCC classification. (The A-15 class PCCs were rebuilt from A-9 class cars purchased new in 1950–1951.)

The PCC cars were replaced by CLRV streetcars in 1994 due to complaints of squealing from the PCC wheels.

On 29 March 2015, Flexity Outlook low-floor vehicles were introduced on the 509 Harbourfront streetcar line. Since March 2017, the line has operated exclusively with Flexity vehicles, making the route fully accessible.

The TTC operated one of its two remaining PCC cars (of the A-15 class) on Sunday afternoons during the summer between Victoria Day and Labour Day, subject to the availability of a PCC and a driver trained to operate it. This service had occurred in 2009, 2010, 2011, 2012, 2016 and 2017.

== Route ==
Most stops along the 509 route are surface stops with islands separating the regular traffic from the streetcar tracks. Streetcars begin underground at Union station and pass through a dedicated underground streetcar station at Queens Quay before climbing to the surface.

=== Stop list ===
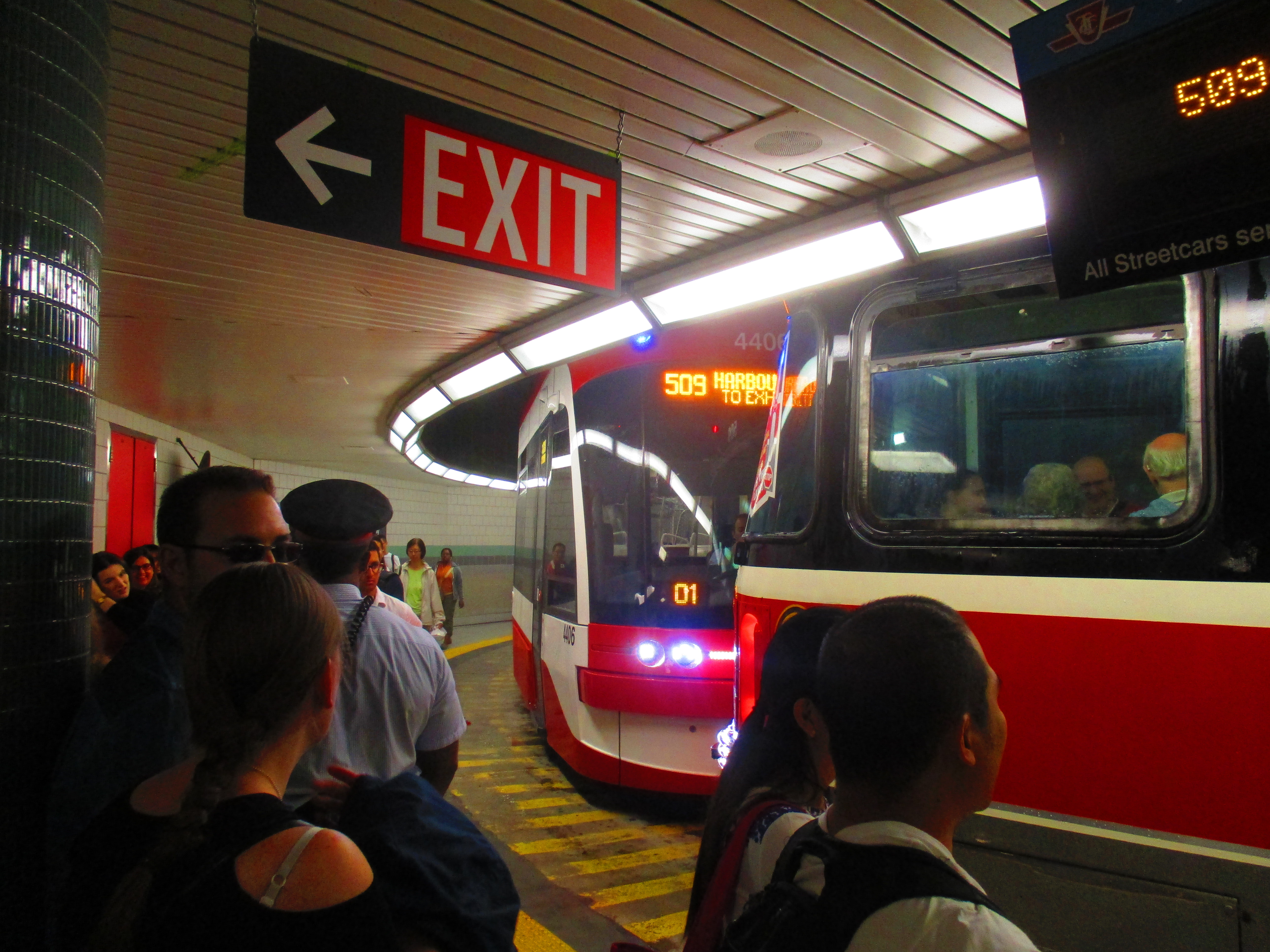
A Flexity Outlook car behind a CLRV car in the Union station loop

Stop	Type	Connections	Nearby Points of Interest
Exhibition Loop	Surface terminal	511	Exhibition Place, Coca-Cola Coliseum, BMO Field
Strachan Ave	Surface stop	511	Exhibition Place
Fort York Blvd	Surface stop	511	Fort York
Bastion St	Surface stop	511	HMCS York
Lake Shore Blvd	Surface stop	511	
Bathurst Quay	Surface stop		Toronto City Airport
Dan Leckie Way	Surface Stop		
Lower Spadina Ave	Surface stop	510	
Rees St	Surface stop		CN Tower, Rogers Centre
Harbourfront Centre	Surface stop		Harbourfront Centre
Queens Quay	Underground station		Jack Layton Ferry Terminal
Union station	Underground station	Mainline rail interchange Amtrak	Scotiabank Arena

== Proposed expansion ==
The proposed Waterfront West LRT project would extend the Harbourfront line farther west to join the existing right-of-way along the Queensway. This project was shelved by the city in 2013 but was revived for reconsideration in 2015.
