= 508 Lake Shore =

Streetcar route in Toronto, Canada

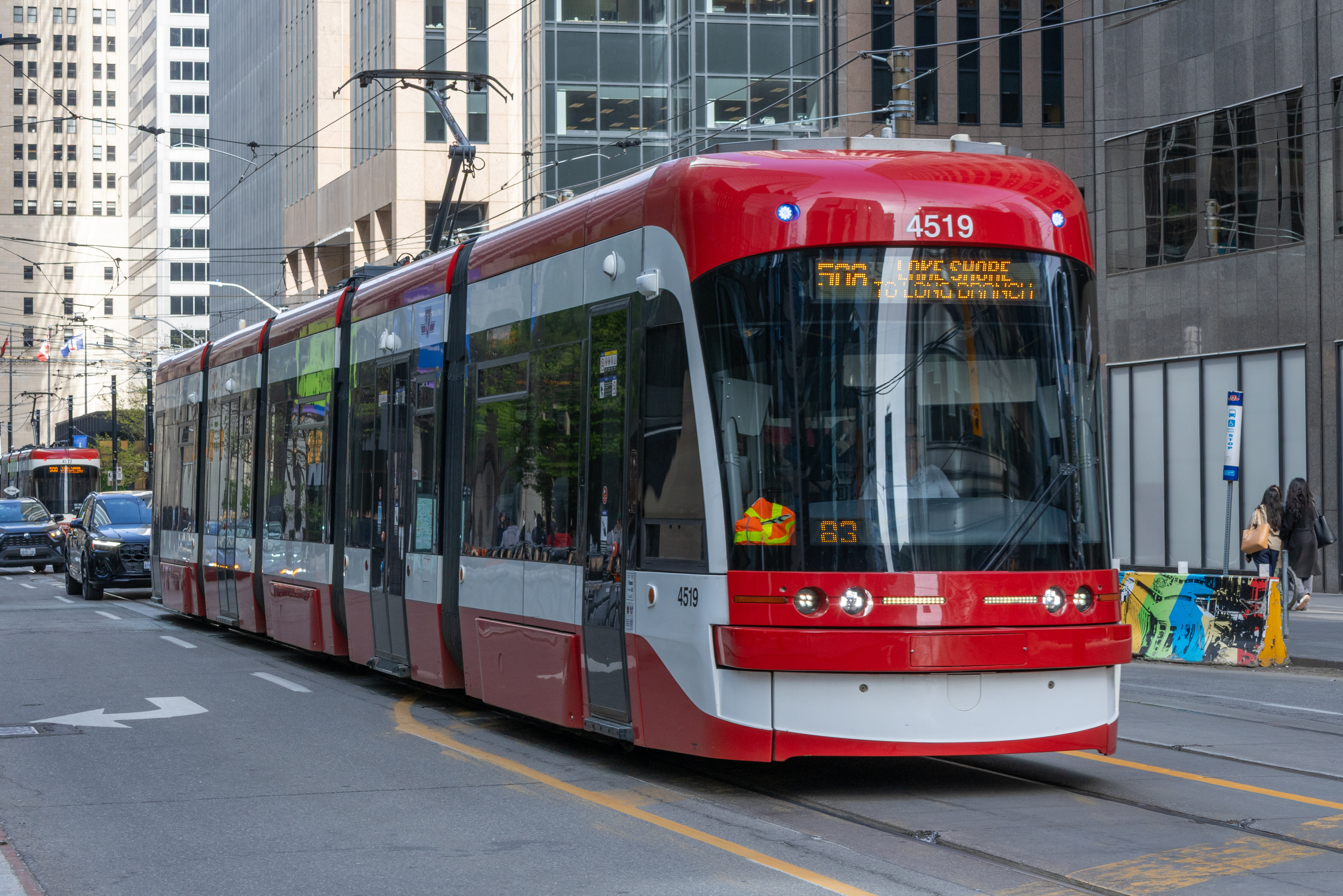

Overview
- Status: Active
- Locale: Toronto, Ontario
- Termini: Long Branch Loop; Distillery Loop
- Stations: St. Andrew; King
- Website: Official route page

Service
- Type: Streetcar Route
- Route number: 508
- Operator: Toronto Transit Commission
- Depot: Roncesvalles Carhouse
- Rolling stock: Flexity Outlook

History
- Opened: 1992

Technical
- Line length: 19.0 km (11.8 mi)
- Track gauge: 4 ft 10 7/8 in (1,495 mm)
- Electrification: 600 V DC overhead

The 508 Lake Shore is an east–west streetcar route in Toronto, Ontario, Canada, operated by the Toronto Transit Commission (TTC). The route serves the downtown financial district operating between the western limit of the city, and the western edge of Toronto's east end. The route is a weekday rush-hour service.

== Route description ==
The route overlaps several other streetcar routes, including 507 Long Branch, 501 Queen, 503 Kingston Rd, and 504 King. From Long Branch Loop, the 508 route runs along Lake Shore Boulevard West through Humber Loop, continuing via the Queensway. At Roncesvalles Avenue, it turns onto King Street into the downtown area, using the King Street Transit Priority Corridor. East of downtown, the route continues along King Street, before turning at Sumach Street and heading a short distance south along Cherry Street before looping at Distillery Loop.

The route operates as a weekday rush hour service running eastbound from Long Branch Loop during the morning rush hours and westbound from Distillery Loop during the evening rush hours. Service frequency is every 20 minutes. The 508 route does not normally operate between June and September.

== History ==
On January 6, 1992, the route began as an experiment to test how attractive it would be to riders. The TTC scheduled 3 runs for each of the morning and afternoon rush hours, signing eastbound streetcars as "504 Parliament" and westbound as "507 Long Branch". By February 1994, the experiment was deemed a success and additional afternoon rush-hour trips were added. On Sunday, March 26, 1995, the same date when route 507 Long Branch was merged into 501 Queen, the route received its 508 number, but rollsigns would not be updated until about 1999.

Due to the streetcar shortage caused by the delayed deliveries of Bombardier Flexity Outlook streetcars, the route ceased operation after the morning rush on June 19, 2015. Before the route was suspended in 2015, the westbound evening runs started at Church Street rather than Parliament Street.

In July 2019, the TTC scheduled the reintroduction of 508 service for September 3, 2019, with five eastbound trips during the morning rush hour and five westbound trips during the afternoon rush hour, using low-floor Flexity streetcars. The 508 streetcars had a few unofficial routings. Upon reaching Parliament Street, the morning eastbound streetcars turned north on that street and then west at Gerrard Street to follow and supplement the 506 Carlton route before returning to the Roncesvalles Carhouse. From the Roncesvalles Carhouse, the afternoon 506 streetcars travelled east on King Street past Parliament Street to Queen Street East, and looped via Broadview Avenue, Dundas Street East and Parliament Street before starting the published route via King Street, the Queensway and Lake Shore Boulevard West to Long Branch Loop.

On March 24, 2020, the 508 Lake Shore route was discontinued due to low ridership during the COVID-19 pandemic.

With the completion of infrastructure work west of Roncesvalles Avenue, the TTC scheduled 508 Lake Shore to resume between Long Branch Loop and Parliament Street effective October 30, 2023. On weekdays (excluding holidays), 508 streetcars ran every 20 minutes in peak periods, leaving Long Branch Loop eastbound in the morning rush hours, and leaving Parliament Street westbound in the evening rush hours.

Effective June 24, 2024, the TTC extended 508 Lake Shore via King Street, Queen Street and Broadview Avenue to Broadview station.

Effective September 2, 2025, route 508 Lake Shore was cut back to Distillery Loop on Cherry Street south of King, and service to Broadview Station was removed.

== See also ==
- Toronto streetcar system
- Toronto Transit Commission
- The Queensway § Streetcar right-of-way used by 508 Lake Shore
