= 507 Long Branch =

Streetcar route in Toronto, Canada

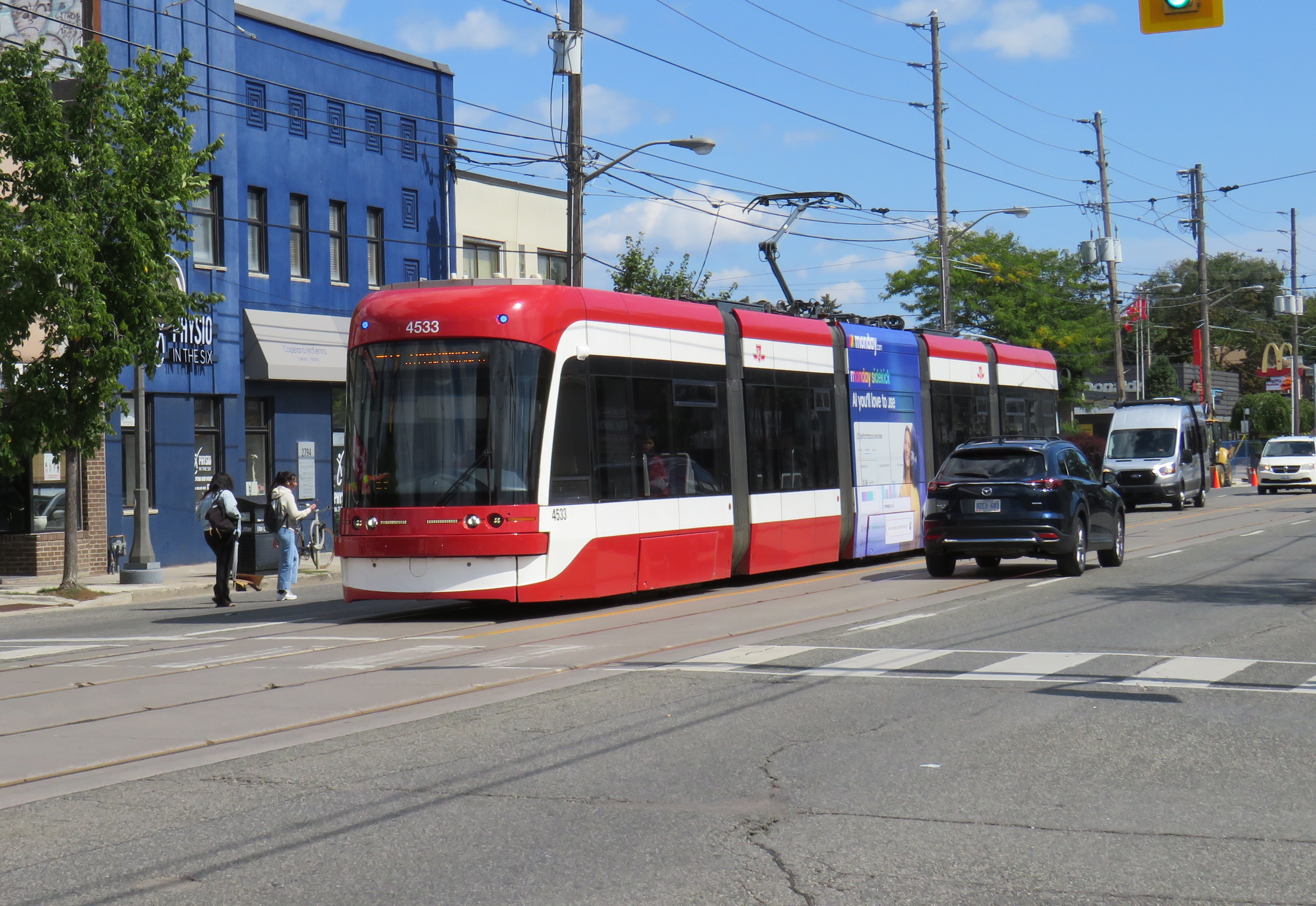
- Streetcar on the 507 Long Branch route

Overview
- Status: Active
- Locale: Etobicoke, Toronto, Ontario
- Termini: Humber Loop (east); Long Branch Loop (west)
- Website: Official route page

Service
- System: Toronto streetcar system
- Route number: 507 (501 after 10 pm, 301 overnight)
- Operator: Toronto Transit Commission
- Depot: Roncesvalles Carhouse
- Rolling stock: Flexity Outlook

History
- Opened: 1935; 91 years ago

Technical
- Line length: 7.9 km (4.9 mi)
- Track gauge: 4 ft 10 7/8 in (1,495 mm)
- Electrification: 600 V DC overhead

507 Long Branch is an east–west Toronto streetcar route in Ontario, Canada, operated by the Toronto Transit Commission (TTC). It runs along Lake Shore Boulevard between Humber Loop and Long Branch Loop (just west of Browns Line, adjacent to Long Branch GO Station). It operates entirely within Toronto's Etobicoke district. After 10 pm, 507 Long Branch is replaced by a westward extension of the 501 Queen from Humber Loop to Long Branch Loop. Overnight, 301 Queen, part of the TTC's Blue Night Network service, replaces both 501 Queen and 507 Long Branch, operating from approximately 1 am to 5 am between Neville Park Loop and Long Branch loop. The rush-hour 508 Lake Shore route overlaps 507 Long Branch west of Humber Loop.

The Long Branch route originally operated from 1935 to 1995, and was numbered "507" when the CLRV streetcars were put into service beginning in 1979. Between 2016 and 2020, the 501 Queen route had a branch that operated like the 507 streetcar but was signed as route 501 Queen. On November 19, 2023, the TTC split the 501 Queen route, rebranding the portion west of Humber Loop as 507 Long Branch.

== History ==
=== Before 1935 ===
Until September 27, 1928, service along Lake Shore Boulevard west of Humber Loop was provided by the single-track Mimico radial line which continued west to Port Credit. Starting from that date, the TTC replaced the radial track to Long Branch with a double-track streetcar line. On December 8, 1928, the Lake Shore streetcar service (not the same as the later 508 Lake Shore) began operation from downtown Toronto to Long Branch Loop where, until 1937, passengers could transfer to the shortened Port Credit radial line. An extra fare was required to travel from west of Humber Loop to downtown.

=== 1935–1995: first Long Branch route ===
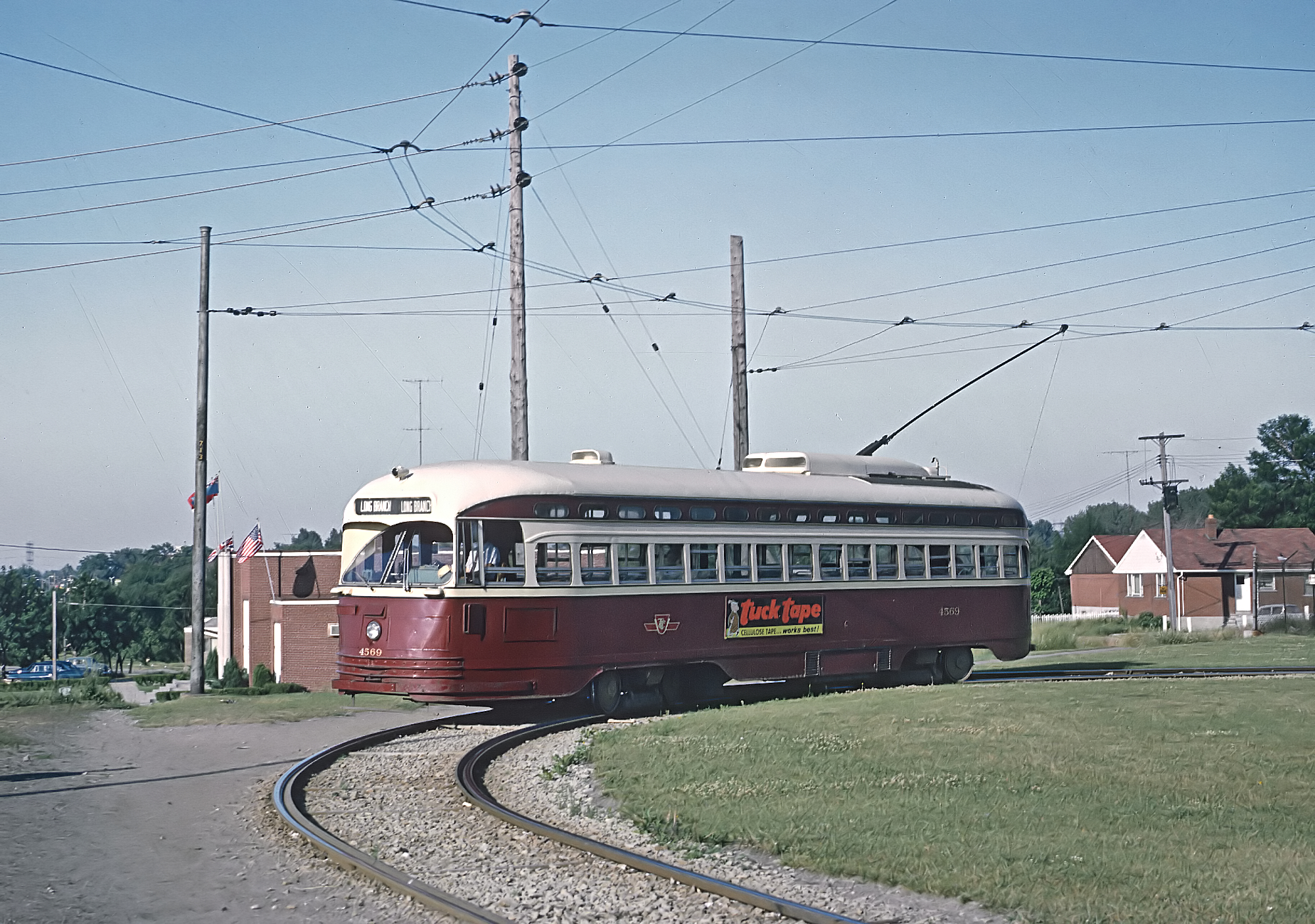
PCC streetcar on the Long Branch route at Long Branch Loop in 1966

On October 28, 1935, the Lake Shore streetcar route was split, and the new Long Branch route was created to run between Long Branch Loop and Roncesvalles Carhouse. In 1958, when a new reserved streetcar right-of-way was opened on the Queensway, the Long Branch route (later called 507 Long Branch) was cut back operating mainly west of Humber Loop.

On January 1, 1973, passengers could transfer between the Long Branch and Queen streetcars at Humber Loop without paying an extra fare.

Around early 1978, the TTC announced plans to number all of its streetcar routes (which had been known only by names), and the Long Branch route was to be number 507. On September 30, 1979, it became the first TTC streetcar route to display a route number, when Long Branch – now 507 Long Branch – became the first route to employ the then-new CLRV in revenue service. All other routes continued to use PCC streetcars exclusively, and the PCCs had not yet been equipped with route-number rollsigns. However, PCCs on all routes began displaying route numbers on February 4, 1980.

On January 19, 1988, 507 Long Branch was the first route to employ the ALRV in revenue service.

On March 26, 1995, the TTC merged the 507 Long Branch route into 501 Queen, making one continuous route from Neville Park Loop in the east to Long Branch Loop in the west.

=== 2016–2020: Pseudo 507 route ===
Between 2016 and 2020, a branch of 501 Queen operated between Humber and Long Branch Loops just like the former 507 Long Branch.

By 2015, passengers were complaining about service on the 501 streetcar. Streetcars would often arrive at irregular intervals, causing unscheduled waits of 20–30 minutes. Streetcars would also do unscheduled short turns at Kingston Road or Roncesvalles Avenue, forcing passengers to exit and wait for the next streetcar. To address these problems and make service more predictable for riders, the TTC split the 501 Queen route.

On January 3, 2016, the 501 Queen route was split into two sections at Humber Loop. The split was in effect only from 5 am to 10 pm. During the split, service over the entire route operated at intervals of ten minutes or better. The change was also made to provide more frequent service on each segment and to eliminate all but emergency short turns (such as for an accident) on the segment east of Humber Loop. Transfer-free service through Humber Loop was still provided by 3 runs in the morning, in the late evening and overnight. Some riders reported shorter streetcar wait times after the split.

The split was suspended starting from January 8, 2017, due to construction projects affecting Humber Loop. When streetcar service west of Humber Loop resumed on June 24, 2018, the split was reinstated. Initially, the TTC provided five transfer-free trips during the morning peak period; however, effective September 2, 2018, the TTC temporarily suspended these five runs due to a shortage of streetcars.

From June 21, 2020, most 501 Queen streetcars operated the full route between Neville Park and Long Branch loops. This ended the split in 501 Queen service at Humber Loop where passengers from Long Branch had to change streetcars to continue downtown.

=== 2023–present: reinstated 507 route ===
In a presentation dated July 12, 2023, the TTC announced that it intended to restore the 507 Long Branch streetcar along its original route between Long Branch Loop and Humber Loop. Service was expected to start on September 3, 2023. However, as of October 2023, the track west of Sunnyside Loop was still closed due to ongoing construction. On November 19, 2023, the TTC restored the 507 streetcar.
