= Cineplex Cinemas Queensway and VIP =

Cinema in Toronto, Ontario, Canada

- Former names: Cineplex Odeon Queensway Cinemas (2001–2014)
- Address: 1025 The Queensway; Toronto, Ontario; Canada
- Owner: Cineplex, Inc.
- Operator: Cineplex Entertainment LP
- Type: Movie theatre
- Screen: 20
- Parking: 1277

Construction
- Opened: November 16, 2001; 25 years ago

Website
- Website

Cineplex Cinemas Queensway and VIP is a major movie theatre in Islington-City Centre West of Etobicoke, a district in Toronto, Ontario, Canada, at the Queensway and Islington Avenue, owned and operated by Cineplex Entertainment.

The theatre opened on November 16, 2001 as Cineplex Odeon Queensway Cinemas by Loews Cineplex Entertainment, replacing the nearby theatre in Sherway Gardens, which opened in 1987 and had 13 screens as of 1996. Cinemark intended to build the theatre at this location, but the land had been sold to Loews Cineplex before being built. It was then transferred to Cineplex Galaxy when Onex acquired the Canadian operations of Loews Cineplex in 2003. Theatrical films are screened at the venue year-round. On January 17, 2014, a VIP section opened at the venue. It is Toronto's second largest theatre after Cineplex Cinemas Yonge-Dundas and VIP.

When it first opened, Queensway Cinemas debuted with the release of Harry Potter and the Philosopher's Stone, along with other popular films such as Monsters, Inc. and Shallow Hal.

In 2025, Toronto City Council approved a plan to replace the theatre with condominiums, a park, and a daycare. The plan received backlash from residents. The theatre's lease was subsequently renewed and Cineplex confirmed that the theatre will remain open.
