= Long Branch GO Station =

Railway station in Toronto, Canada

Long Branch
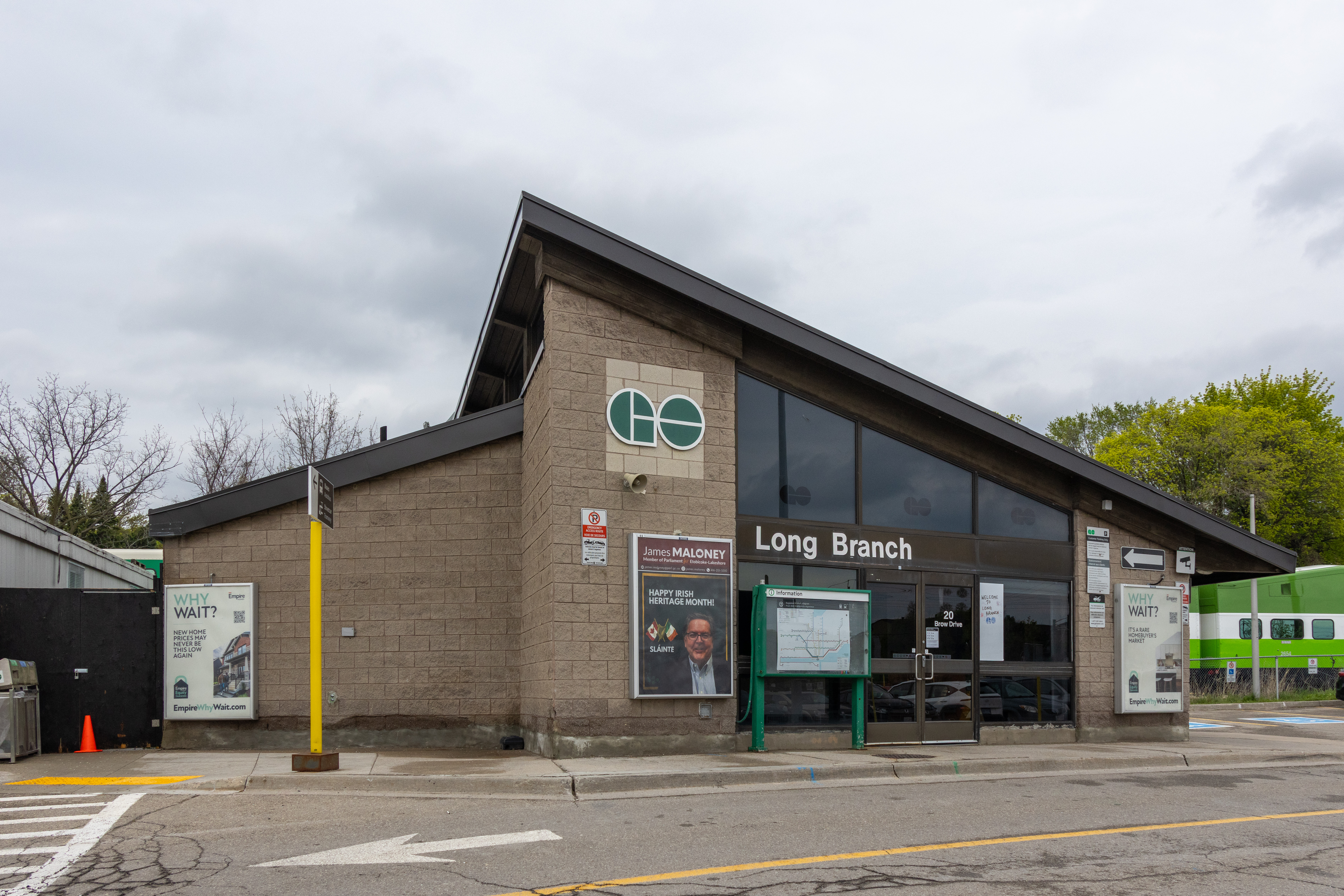

General information
- Location: 20 Brow Drive; Toronto, Ontario; M8W 3P6
- Coordinates: 43°35′31″N 79°32′44″W
- Owner: Metrolinx
- Platforms: 1 side platform, 1 island platform
- Tracks: 3
- Connections: TTC streetcars at Long Branch Loop; TTC buses MiWay

Construction
- Parking: 280 spaces
- Cycle facilities: Covered rack
- Accessible: No

Other information
- Station code: GO Transit: LO
- Fare zone: 59

History
- Opened: May 23, 1967; 59 years ago
- Electrified: September 2035; 8 years' time (planned)

Services
Preceding station	GO Transit	Following station
Port Credit towards Confederation	Lakeshore West	Mimico towards Union
Former services at CN station
Preceding station	Canadian National Railway	Following station
Dixie Road toward Suspension Bridge	Niagara Falls – Toronto; Local stops	Mimico toward Toronto
Location

Long Branch GO Station is a GO Transit railway station in Toronto, Ontario, Canada. It is one of the Lakeshore West line stations, serving the Long Branch neighbourhood.

Being one of the original GO Stations built in 1967, it is now scheduled for modernization. The plans would make the station accessible with new elevators, connecting tunnels, washrooms and canopies over the platforms. It is expected to be 2016 before these upgrades are complete. It is also anticipated that more condominium development in the area will increase the population density of the neighbourhood and attract more riders.

== Connecting local transit ==
The station is adjacent to the Toronto Transit Commission's Long Branch Loop, which serves as the western terminus of the 507 Long Branch (previously 501 Queen) streetcar route as well as TTC and MiWay bus routes.
