= Long Branch Loop =

Streetcar loop in Toronto, Canada

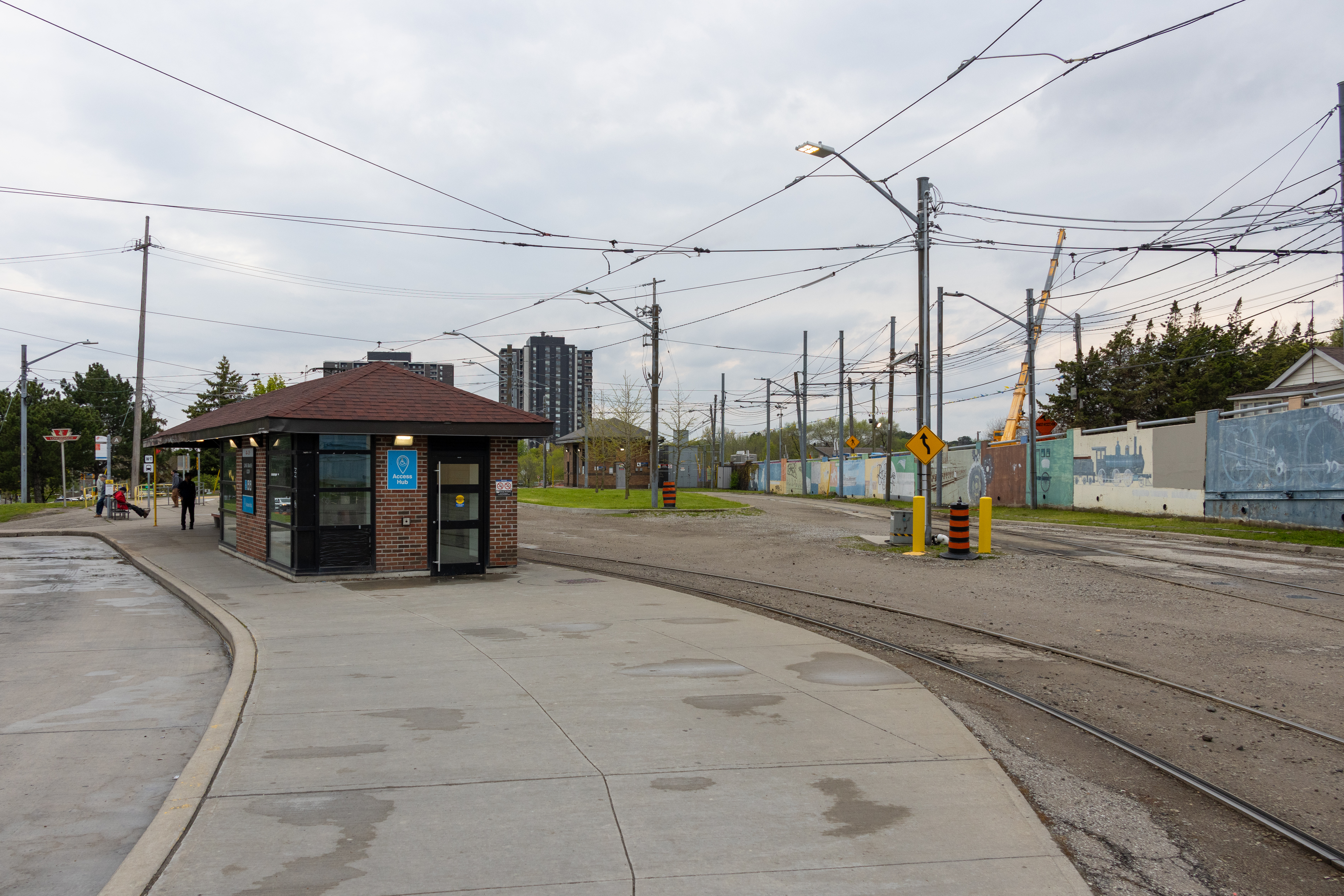

General information
- Location: Lake Shore Boulevard West, Toronto, Ontario; Canada
- Coordinates: 43°35′30″N 79°32′40″W
- Owner: Toronto Transit Commission
- Connections: TTC buses; MiWay; at Long Branch GO Station

History
- Opened: December 28, 1928; 97 years ago
- Rebuilt: 1950s
Location

Long Branch Loop is the westernmost streetcar stop within the Toronto streetcar system, operated by the Toronto Transit Commission (TTC). It is located in the Long Branch neighbourhood in southwestern Toronto, close to the boundary with Mississauga. Long Branch Loop is the western terminus for four streetcar routes but is principally served by the 507 Long Branch route. Several TTC and MiWay bus routes terminate at the loop.

Westbound streetcars enter the turning loop from Lake Shore Boulevard and turn counter-clockwise to face east on the north side of the platform. Bus bays are on the opposite south side of the platform with a shelter building in the centre, which once provided washrooms and a waiting room for the public.

== History ==
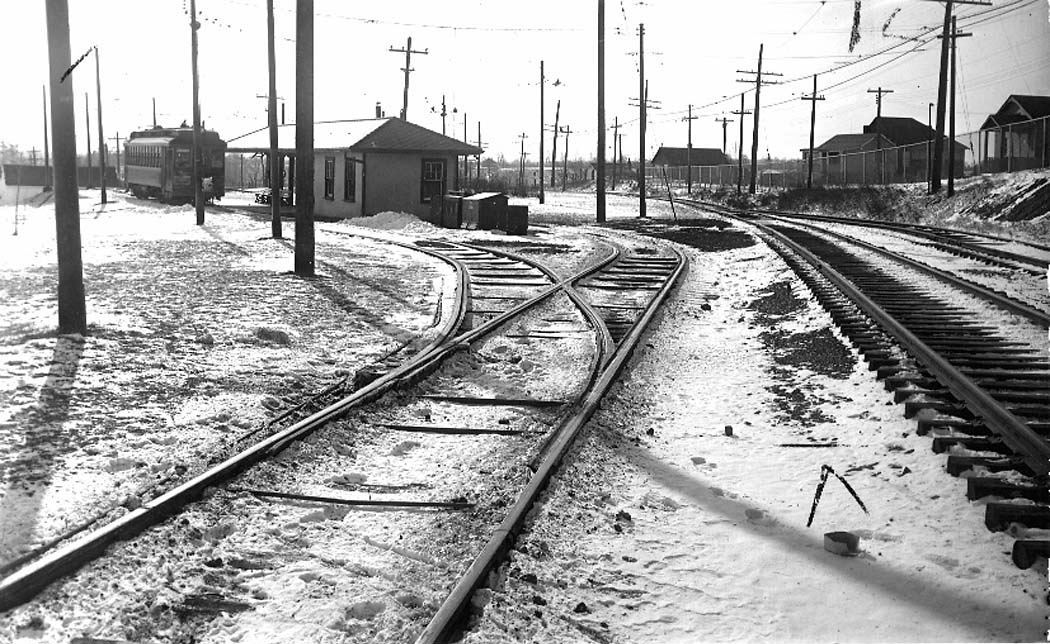
The loop in 1935, showing the last radial car to go west to Port Credit

The Toronto and Mimico Electric Railway and Light Company operated radial railway service along Lake Shore Boulevard originally as a single track line, with sidings to allow vehicles going in opposite directions to pass each other. The TTC double-tracked the route, and first operated a loop at Long Branch on December 28, 1928.

The TTC has used the loop as an interchange point with buses since at least 1935, when the widening of Lakeshore Road west of Etobicoke Creek required the removal of the single-track service to Port Credit. The TTC replaced the streetcar route with the 74 Port Credit bus route, which ran until 1976, when the service was taken over by the newly created Mississauga Transit. Other historic TTC bus routes that terminated at the Long Branch loop included 69 Queensway and 87 West Mall.

In 1967, Long Branch GO Station was opened on the adjacent Lakeshore West railway line; service is available as far west as Hamilton or east to the downtown Union Station hub.

On January 6, 1992, the TTC started the 508 Lake Shore rush-hour route running from Long Branch Loop to downtown Toronto via Lake Shore Boulevard, the Queensway and King Street.

The TTC operated a separate Long Branch line (which became route 507 Long Branch), running between Long Branch Loop and Humber Loop, until 1996, when that route was merged with the 501 Queen route. A 2012 National Post article described the extended 501 Queen as the longest streetcar line in North America.

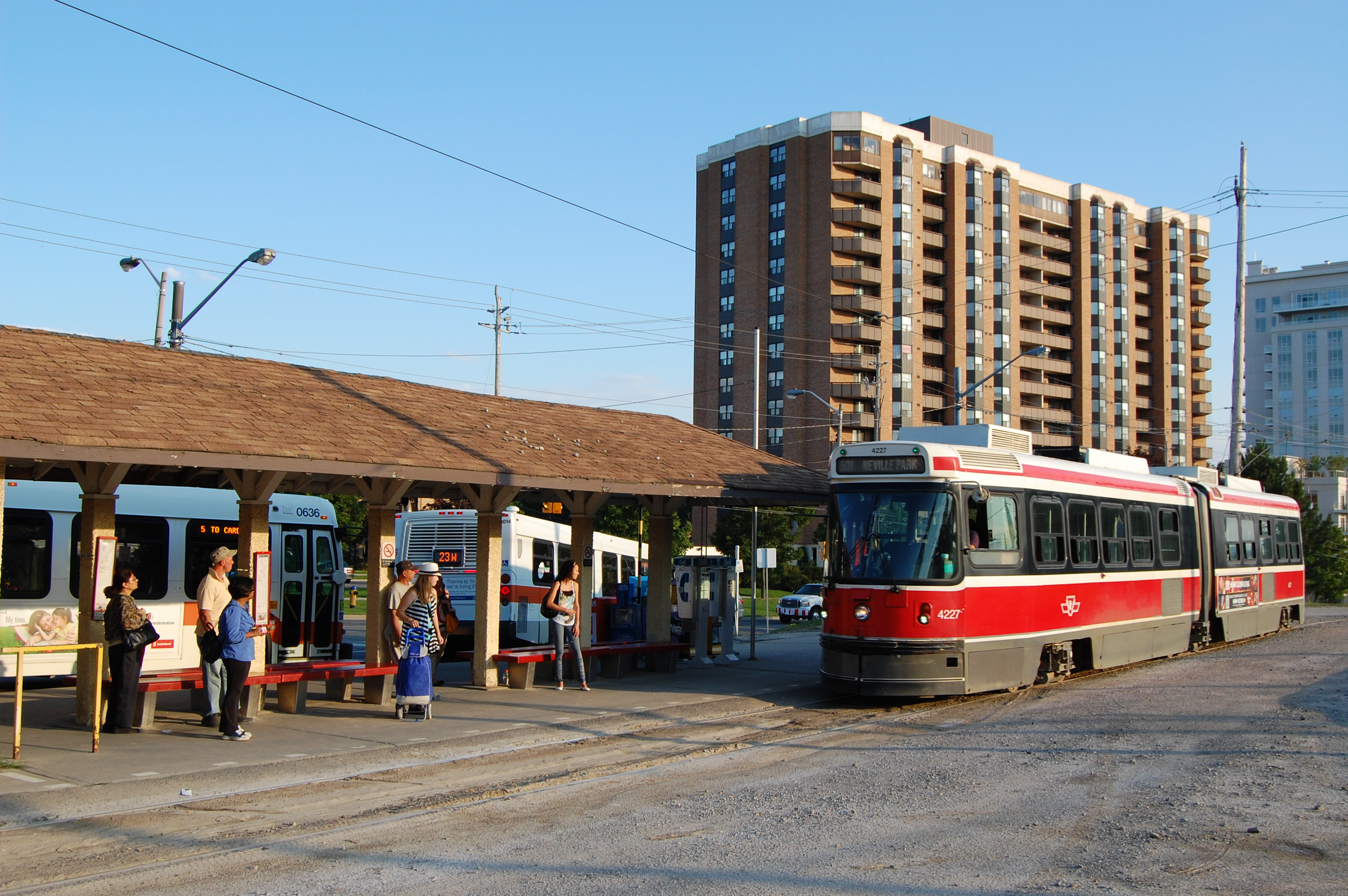
An ALRV streetcar at the loop in 2011

In 2011, the Canadian Broadcasting Corporation broadcast a 14-minute semi-autobiographical short film entitled Long Branch. The film shows two strangers, who were about to share a one-night stand, have their plans fall apart as the distance to the Long Branch loop was too far, and they had too much time to talk to each other first. The filmmakers were a couple, and one member of the film-making couple lived at the Long Branch loop and said his partner routinely declined to come home with him because of the distance.

In early 2016, the 501 Queen route was split at Humber Loop requiring through-riders to change streetcars there. The section between Humber and Long Branch Loops was still branded as 501 Queen even though the section operated like the former 507 Long Branch. In late 2023, after a closure for construction, the section west of Humber Loop was reopened as 507 Long Branch.

== Services ==
As of November 19, 2023, the TTC streetcar and bus routes serving Long Branch Loop are:

Route	Destinations	Notes
501 Queen	To Neville Park Loop	Late evening service only
507 Long Branch	To Humber Loop	No late evening service
508 Lake Shore	To Distillery Loop	Rush hours only
301 Queen	To Neville Park Loop	Blue Night service replacing 501 streetcar
110A Islington South	To Islington station	Bus via 30th Street and Horner Avenue
110B Islington South	To Islington station	Bus via Brown's Line and Horner Avenue (rush hour service)
123B Sherway	To Kipling station	Bus via Browns Line, Sherway Gardens, the East Mall and Shorncliffe
123C Sherway	To Kipling station	Bus via Sherway Gardens and North Queen Street

MiWay (Mississauga) bus routes serving Long Branch Loop are:

Route	Destinations	Notes
5 Dixie	To Lorimar Drive/Cardiff Boulevard	Near Derry Road, northwest of Toronto Pearson International Airport
23 Lakeshore	To Clarkson GO Station	
31 Ogden	To Dixie GO Station	
