= The Queensway =

Road in Toronto and Mississauga in Ontario, Canada

The Queensway Queensway
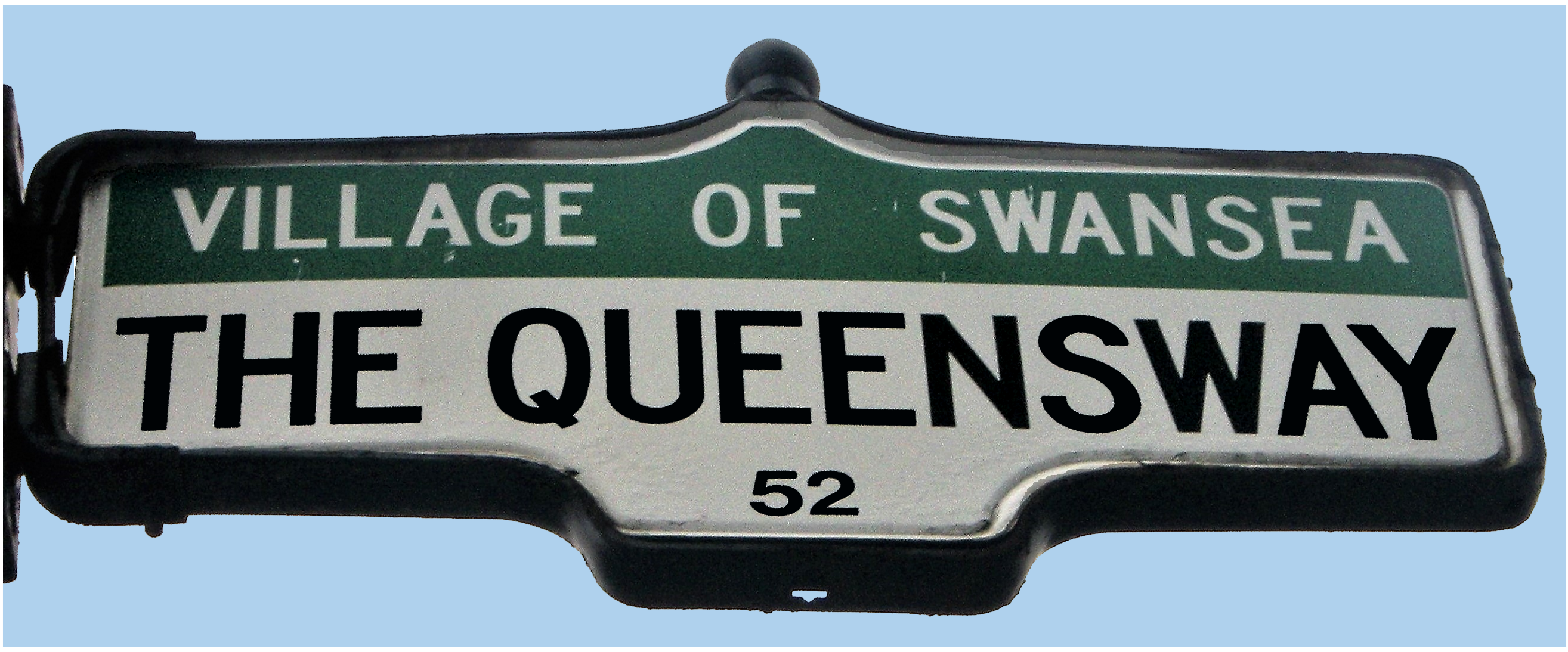
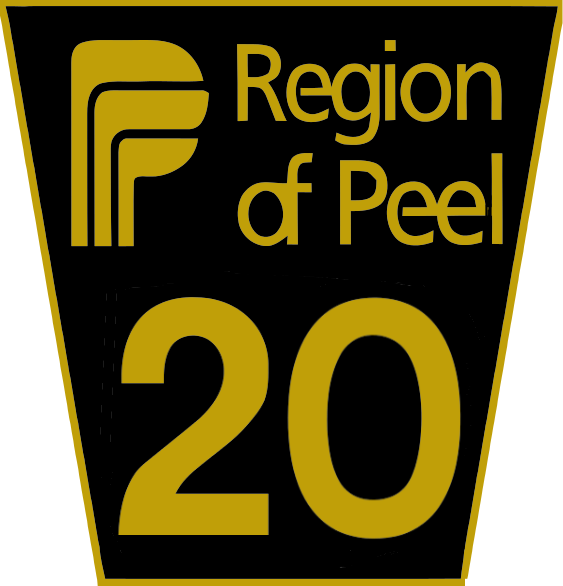
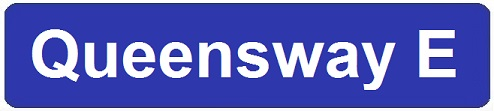
- Peel Regional Road 20
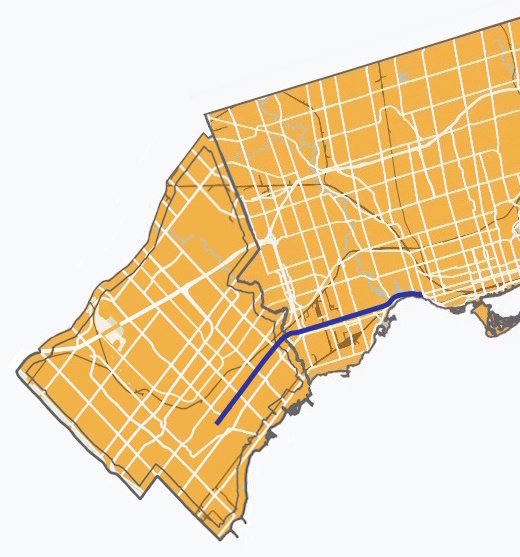
- Route of the Queensway through Toronto and Mississauga (blue line)
- Namesake: From Queen Street, which the Queensway is a westerly continuation of
- Maintained by: City of Toronto; Region of Peel; City of Mississauga
- West end: Glengarry Road
- Major junctions: Mavis Road; Hurontario Street; Cawthra Road; Dixie Road; Highway 427; Kipling Avenue; Islington Avenue; Royal York Road; South Kingsway
- East end: Roncesvalles Avenue / King Street (continues as Queen Street)

Construction
- Inauguration: 1941 (name)

Other
Nearby arterial roads
← Dundas Street; Bloor Street	Queen Elizabeth Way; Gardiner Expressway →

The Queensway (or Queensway) is a major street in the municipalities of Toronto and Mississauga, Ontario, Canada. It is a western continuation of Queen Street, after it crosses Roncesvalles Avenue and King Street in Toronto. The Queensway is a divided roadway from Roncevalles westerly until 600 metres (1,980 ft) of the South Kingsway (accessed by ramps) with its centre median dedicated to streetcar service. The road continues undivided west from there to Etobicoke Creek as a four- or six-lane thoroughfare.

After crossing the creek, it enters Mississauga under Peel Region jurisdiction as Peel Regional Road 20, as far west as Mavis Road, with the westernmost portion to Glengarry Road being a two-lane road maintained by the city. There is a road allowance with hydro lines, cutting into the Mississaugua Golf & Country Club on the shores of the Credit River. In the 1990s, the name Queensway was eliminated on the roads on this allowance west of the river. The street gives its name to Etobicoke's the Queensway–Humber Bay neighbourhood.

From 1953 to 1954, the Queensway was signed briefly as Highway 108 when it was under the then–Department of Highways from Highway 27 (prior to being renamed Highway 427) and the eastern end of the Queen Elizabeth Way (QEW). While the Highway 27-QEW interchange was reconstructed in the late 1960s, the QEW was temporarily diverted to an overpass that would later be permanently used for the Queensway.

== Etymology ==
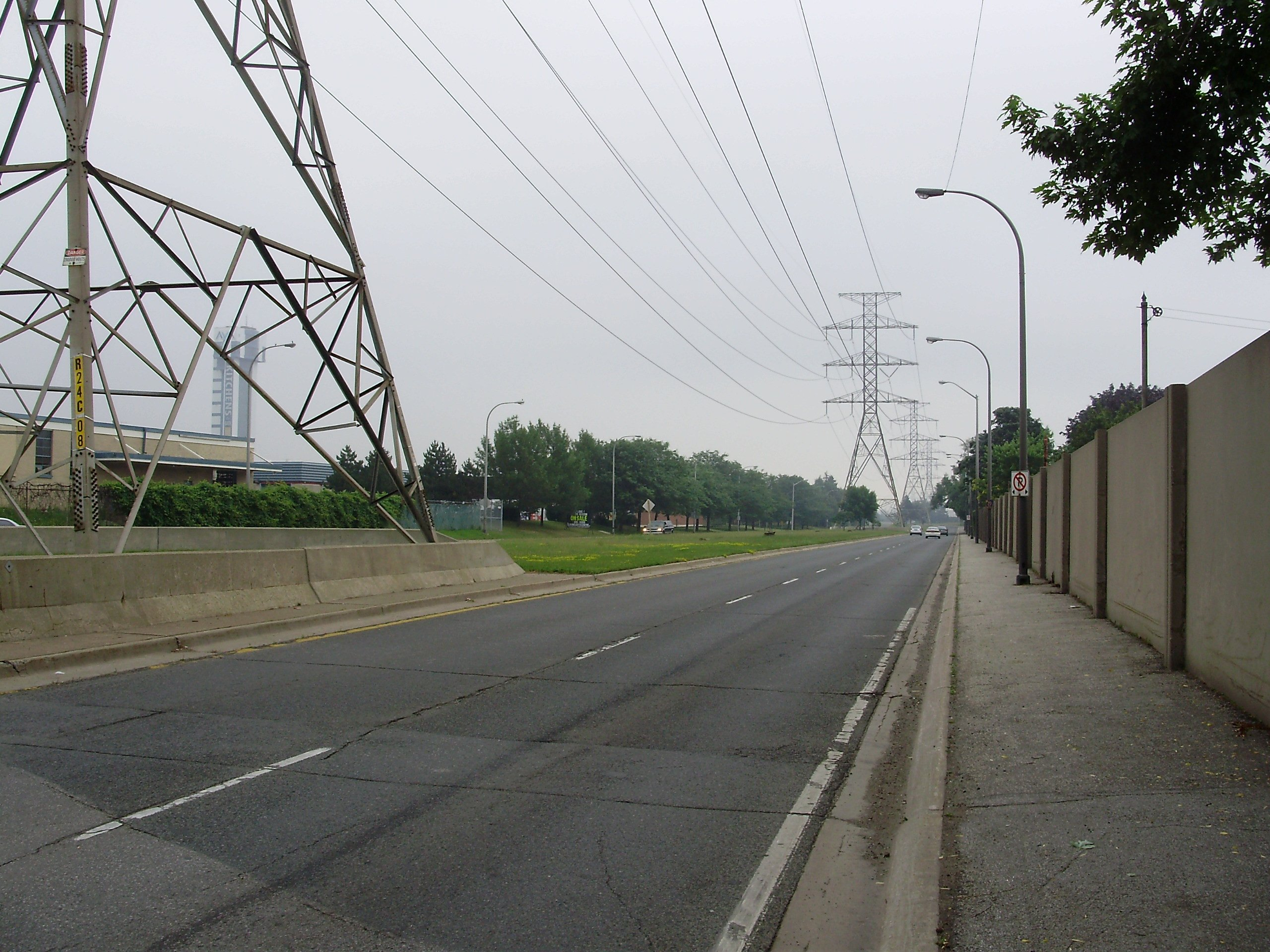
East of Dixie Road, the Queensway runs with a hydro corridor in its median.

The Queensway in Toronto was once named Queen Street and was officially the western part of the street in Old Toronto. There were three separate portions: the easternmost being a stub of the main section of Queen that continued west of Roncesvalles Avenue to Colborne Lodge Drive; a central section separated from it by a swampy area south of Grenadier Pond in High Park, running west of Ellis Avenue; and the westernmost running through the former Etobicoke west of the Humber River. The section west of the Humber was named the Queensway in 1941 to avoid confusion due to the break, but the name "Queen Street" was not restored after the present Queensway was completed to connect the sections of the formerly broken street. The most likely reason for this was because the then–Township of Etobicoke desired to pay homage to the original name, while creating a counterpart to another street named the Kingsway.

In Mississauga, the road is simply named "Queensway", with east and west designations on either side of Hurontario Street: Queensway East and Queensway West

For Highway 427's southbound express and collector carriageways, overhead exit signs formerly showed the Queensway as "Queensway Avenue", while present signs installed since the 2000s use the proper designation. The use of "Queensway Avenue" was likely to avoid confusion with adjacent exit signs for the parallel Queen Elizabeth Way (QEW) at the last collector-to-express transfer (and vice-versa), as after that point, the collector lanes had an off-ramp to the Queensway but no direct access to the QEW (with the express lanes being the opposite). In 2001, the collector lanes received a ramp to access the eastern QEW; nonetheless, there was no longer any need for the "Queensway Avenue" signage as the eastern QEW was re-designated the Gardiner Expressway as a result of 1998 provincial downloading. The old Queensway Avenue signage was still present mixed with the proper signs for a time after the downloading.

== History ==
What would become the Queensway in Mississauga was formerly the Upper Middle Road (or the 1st Concession South of Dundas Street).

=== Temporary role as part of the Toronto–Hamilton Highway ===
In 1931, work began to connect the former western section of Queen Street into the Middle Road across the Etobicoke Creek as part as the Toronto–Hamilton Highway that was the precursor to the Queen Elizabeth Way, which opened in 1937. In 1940, the present freeway alignment for the new QEW was opened to the south, and the road was given its present name the following year.

=== Connection to Queen Street ===
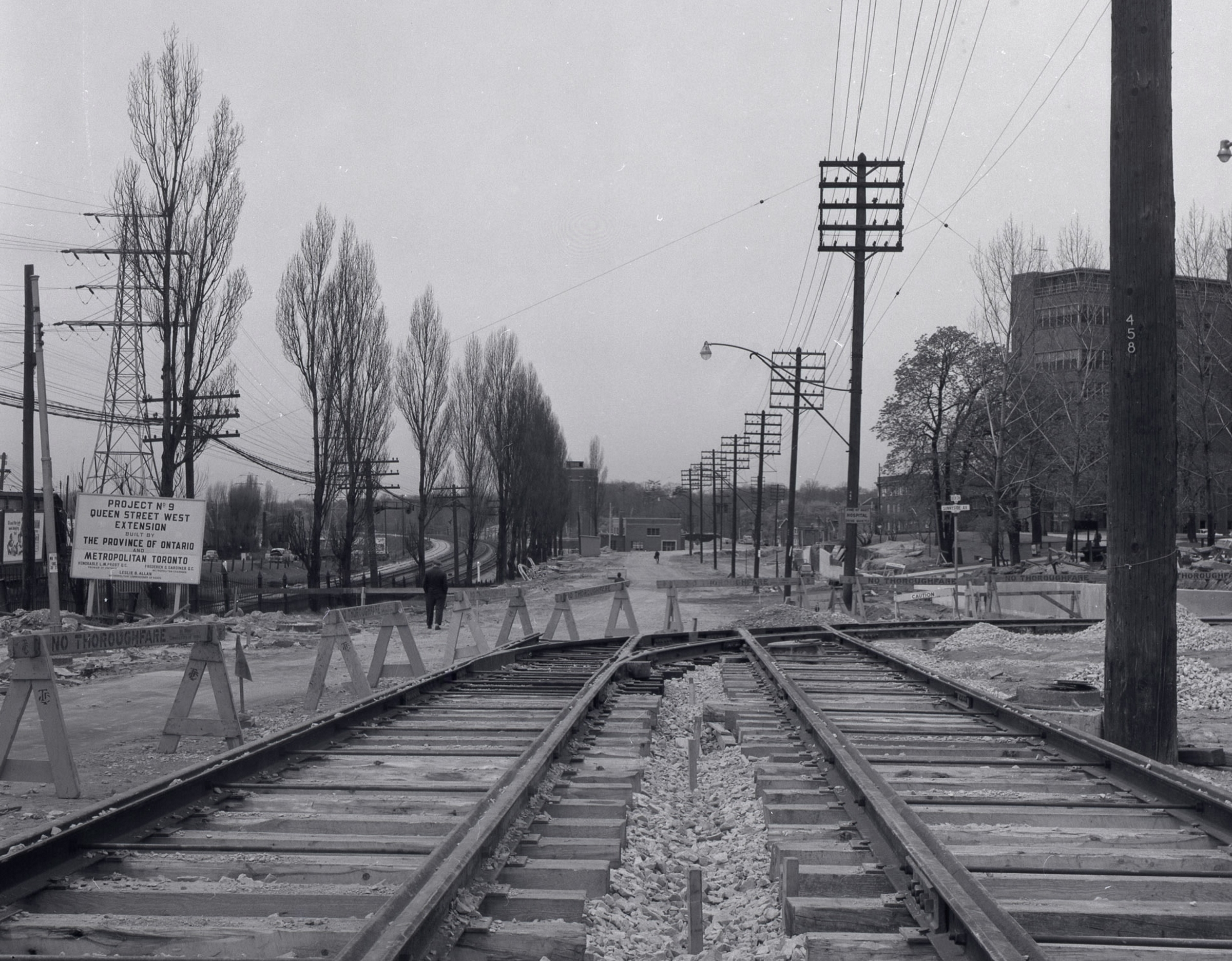
The Queensway under construction in 1956 as the "Queen Street West Extension"

The section between Roncesvalles and the Humber River was built in the 1950s, in conjunction with the construction of the Gardiner Expressway. The Queensway was built before the Gardiner Expressway to provide an east–west route for traffic while Lake Shore Boulevard was rerouted to accommodate the Gardiner. The project cost CA$4.9 million ($56.3 million in 2025 dollars). The project included a streetcar right-of-way in the middle of the Queensway from Parkside Drive to the Humber River.

The section from the Humber River west predates the High Park section and was previously known as Stock's Side Road (before being named Queen Street). It originally spurred off Lake Shore Boulevard (then known as Lake Shore Road) at the Humber River, but that connection was severed with the building of the Queen Elizabeth Way.

To build the Parkside Drive to Ellis Avenue section, the Metro government bought 7.3 hectares (18 acres) of High Park from the city. This was in contravention of stipulations by original High Park owner John Howard that the lands be used for parkland only. Metro officials searched for descendants of Howard to obtain their consent.

=== Streetcar right-of-way ===
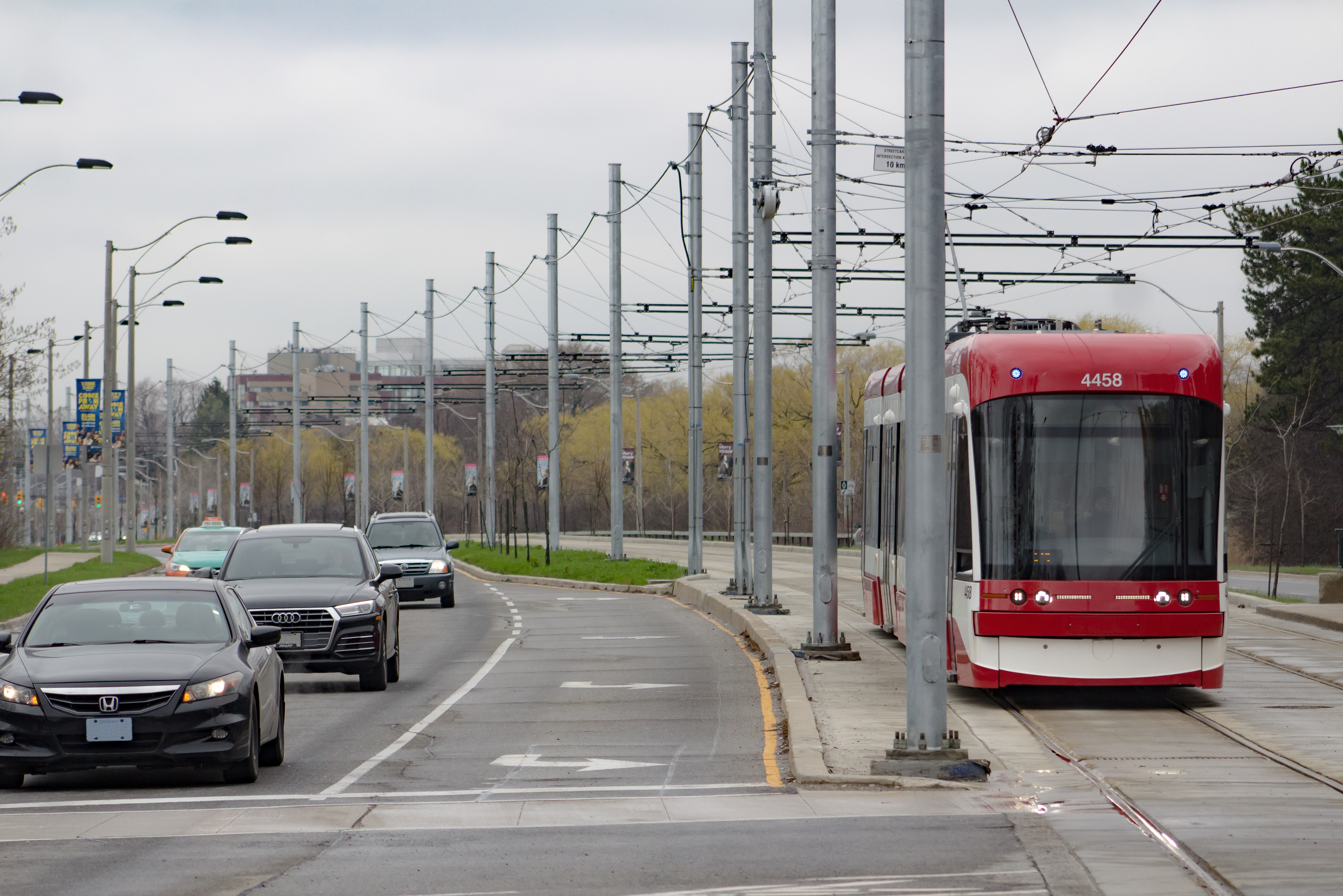
The eastbound and right-of-way lanes, with a Flexity Outlook streetcar in the right-of-way lane

The streetcar right-of-way (ROW) along the Queensway opened on July 20, 1957, together with the new Humber Loop, as construction of the Gardiner Expressway had forced the removal of streetcar tracks along Lake Shore Boulevard between Sunnyside and the Humber River. From the intersection of King Street, the Queensway, Queen Street and Roncesvalles Avenue (KQQR), streetcars originally ran in mixed traffic passing the Sunnyside Loop to about Claude Avenue where the ROW began. (Since then the ROW has been extended between KQQR and Clark Avenue.) The ROW continued west to the relocated Humber Loop.

On January 8, 2017, the ROW was closed in order to reconstruct the Queensway Bridge, carrying streetcar tracks over the Humber River, and to replace streetcar tracks and overhead wire on the ROW and at Humber Loop. Streetcar service resumed to South Kingsway (with streetcars continuing without passengers to turn at Humber Loop) on April 1, 2018, and to Humber loop with passengers on June 24, 2018.

At its west end, the ROW passes through Humber Loop running in a tunnel under the Gardiner Expressway to end in mixed traffic on Lake Shore Boulevard. In November 2017, the TTC issued a report recommending that the ROW be extended along Lake Shore Boulevard from the tunnel to Park Lawn Road, where a new Park Lawn Loop would be constructed. At that time, the TTC considered this to be a high-priority project. Extending the ROW further west was considered unjustified given projected ridership.

On March 31, 2021, the KQQR intersection closed for track replacement and a redesign of the intersection. As a result, buses replaced streetcar service along the Queensway. As part of the construction project, the ROW on the Queensway was extended from Claude Avenue to Roncesvalles Avenue. At Sunnyside Avenue, traffic signals were added to facilitate streetcar movements from the Sunnyside Loop. At Glendale Avenue, the westbound near-side platform were relocated to the far side, and both the westbound and the far-side eastbound platforms were widened for accessibility. Transit priority signals were installed at Glendale Avenue, Sunnyside Avenue, and Roncesvalles Avenue. At KQQR, the eastbound platform on the Queensway was replaced with a far-side platform on Queen Street, the new platform being similar to the "bumpouts" along Roncesvalles Avenue. On January 25, 2023, the newly extended Queensway right-of-way opened to streetcars between KQQR and Sunnyside Loop. On October 29, 2023, streetcar service returned to the Queensway right-of-way west of Sunnyside Loop.

From late October 2023, streetcars have run in the Queenway right-of-way west from the KQQR intersection, passing Sunnyside Loop, crossing the Humber River and turning into Humber Loop. The Queensway right-of-way is used by the 501 Queen and 508 Lake Shore streetcar routes.

=== Extension into Mississauga ===
During the 1970s, the Queensway was extended into Mississauga across the Etobicoke Creek along the right-of-way of Upper Middle Road (not to be confused with the aforementioned Middle Road and the 1930s crossing location today used by the QEW), most of which had been abandoned and turned into a hydro corridor.

== Nearby landmarks ==
From east to west:

Toronto

- Roncesvalles Carhouse, TTC streetcar storage and maintenance facility
- St. Joseph's Health Centre
- High Park
- Ontario Food Terminal
- Palace Pier Park
- Humber Bay Park
- Cineplex Cinemas Queensway and VIP
- Church on the Queensway (formerly named Queensway Cathedral), a Pentecostal megachurch
- Queensway Health Centre
- Sherway Gardens

Mississauga

- Mississauga Hospital
- Huron Park Recreation Centre (north off of the Queensway)
- Credit Valley Golf and Country Club
