= Humber Loop =

Toronto Transit Commission streetcar station

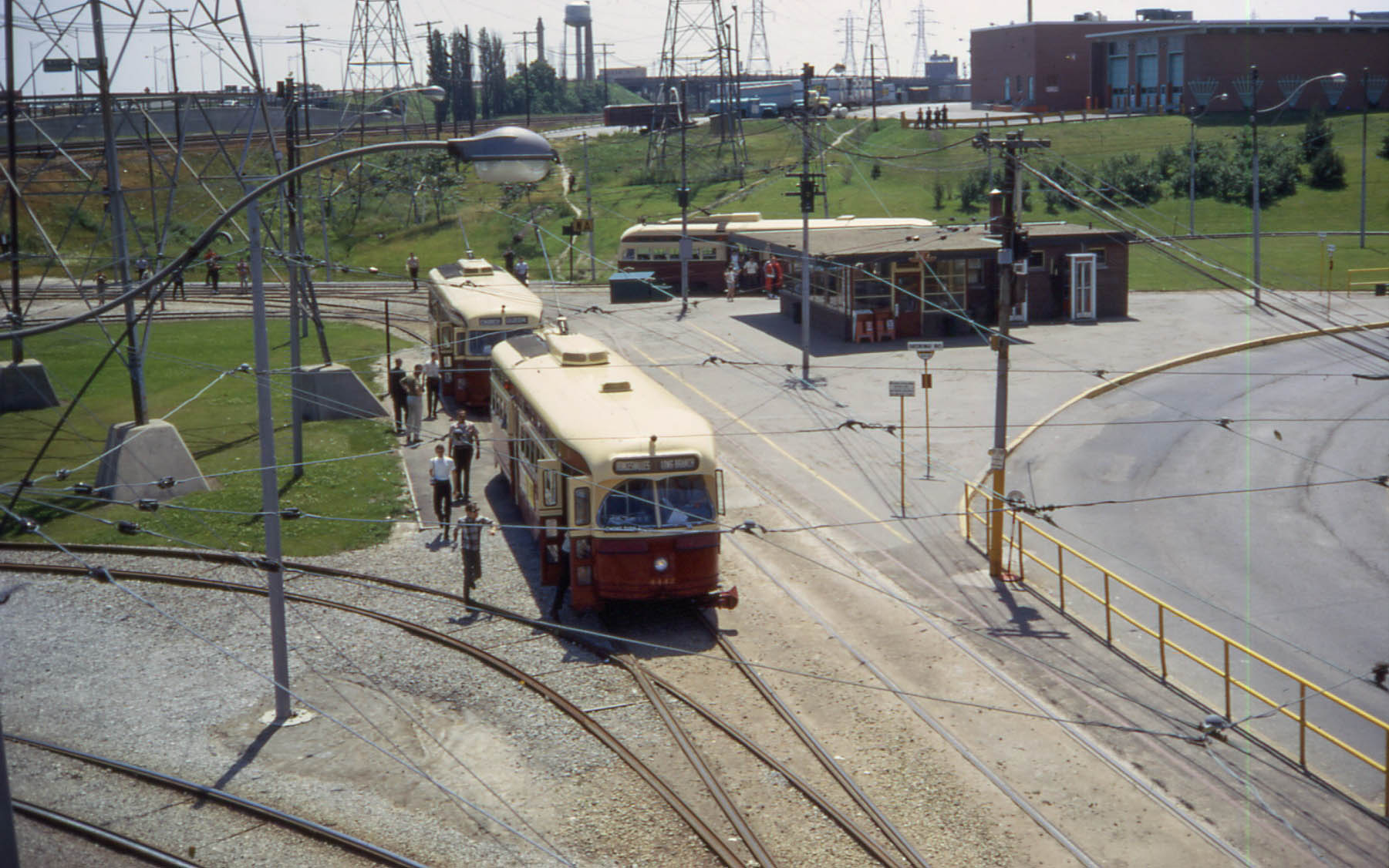
- PCC streetcars in service at the loop in 1968

General information
- Location: The Queensway; Toronto, Ontario; Canada
- Coordinates: 43°37′52″N 79°28′43″W
- Owner: Toronto Transit Commission
- Connections: TTC buses

Construction
- Structure type: waiting area and washroom
- Accessible: yes

History
- Opened: July 20, 1957; 69 years ago (current location)
- Rebuilt: January 8, 2017 – June 24, 2018; 8 years ago
Location

Humber Loop is a multimodal transit station and a hub for streetcar routes. It consists of two streetcar turning loops and one bus loop. Humber Loop is located between the Gardiner Expressway and the Queensway just west of the Humber River in Toronto. The loop is accessed by a private right-of-way along the Queensway on the east side of the loop and by Lake Shore Boulevard on its west side. As of November 19, 2023, four Toronto Transit Commission (TTC) streetcar routes either pass through or terminate at Humber Loop.

== History ==
Besides the current Humber Loop, there were two previous Humber loops. All three served different locations near the lower Humber River.

=== First Humber Loop ===
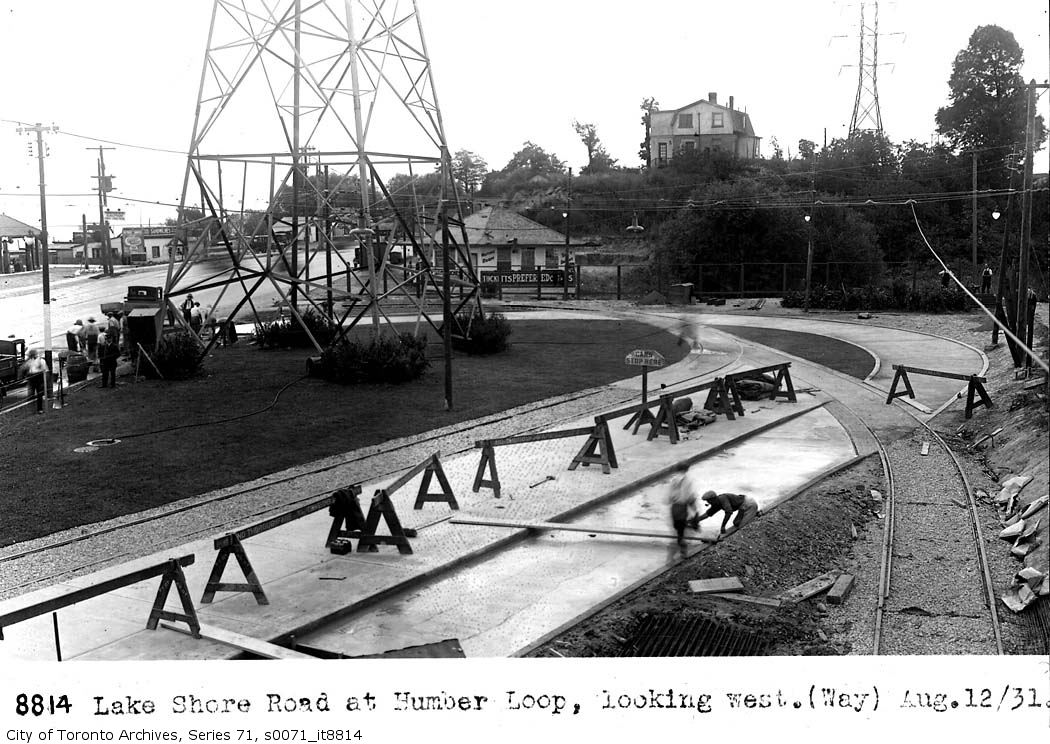
First Humber Loop after rebuilding in 1931

The first Humber Loop opened on July 26, 1922, along Lake Shore Road east of the Humber River at Jane Street (today's South Kingsway). The loop was the terminus of a streetcar branch line that began at the intersection of Roncesvalles Avenue, King Street and Queen Street, crossed a bridge over the rail corridor and descended downhill through Sunnyside to the loop. At the first Humber Loop, riders could transfer to the Mimico radial line to continue westward to Long Branch and Port Credit.

By 1929, there was reduced traffic around the first Humber Loop, as streetcars of the Lake Shore streetcar route had replaced the radial cars to Long Branch, and most short-turns were handled by Parkside Loop at Parkside Drive further to the east. In 1931, the loop closed for rebuilding, reopening on July 29. The first Humber Loop closed permanently on September 12, 1939, in order to construct a ramp to the Queen Elizabeth Way (QEW) which then ran to the Humber River.

=== Second Humber Loop ===
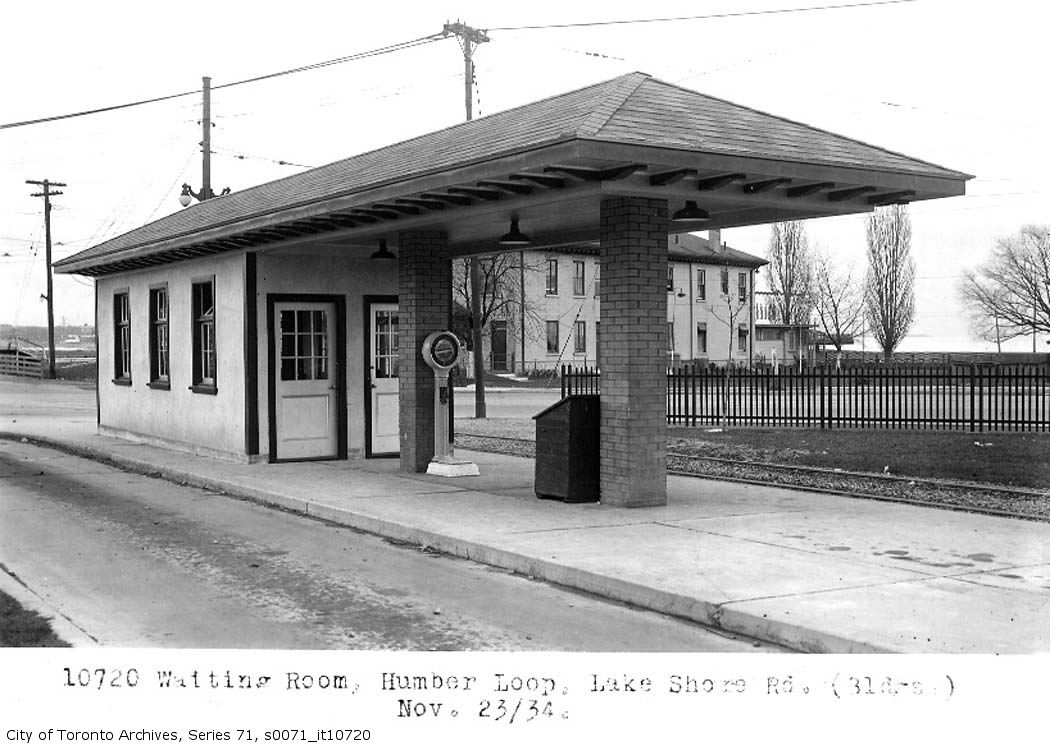
Waiting room at second Humber Loop in November 1934

The second Humber Loop was opened on July 11, 1940, on the north side of then Lakeshore Road intersecting Queen Street (near present day Lakeshore Boulevard and Palace Pier Court and near the historic The Palace Pier). Initially, the second Humber Loop had one east-to-west loop. However, on July 1, 1954, a west-to-east loop was added to split streetcar service at the loop to accommodate a fare zone boundary. Riders had to change streetcars at Humber Loop to travel between downtown and Long Branch. The two loops were nestled between the east- and westbound through-tracks, and all tracks at the loop were located within a central reservation in the middle of Lake Shore Road.

Construction of the Gardiner Expressway required the demolition of the bridge over the railway corridor south of Roncesvalles Avenue. Thus, streetcar tracks from that bridge westwards up to and including the second Humber Loop had to be relocated. This resulted in the closure of the second Humber Loop and the opening of the third, current loop.

=== Current loop ===
Because of the construction of the Gardiner Expressway, streetcar tracks were relaid along the Queensway in a centre reservation to the current Humber Loop with a connection to Lake Shore Boulevard via a tunnel under the railway corridor and the QEW (today part of the Gardiner). The third and current Humber Loop opened on July 20, 1957. Like the previous Humber Loop, the new loop was at a fare zone boundary requiring riders to change streetcars between the Long Branch route (from Long Branch Loop) and the Queen route (from Neville Park Loop).

Between 1967 and early 1977, two-car multiple-unit PCC trains served the Queen streetcar route between Neville Park Loop and Humber Loop. To facilitate the uncoupling of a PCC train at Humber Loop, a passing siding was added to the east-to-west loop.

On January 1, 1973, the fare zone boundary at Humber Loop was eliminated, passengers could transfer between the Long Branch and Queen streetcars at Humber Loop without paying an extra fare.

On March 29, 1996, route 507 Long Branch was merged into 501 Queen, thus creating the longest streetcar line in North America running from Neville Park Loop to Long Branch Loop. It also eliminated the change of streetcars at Humber Loop.

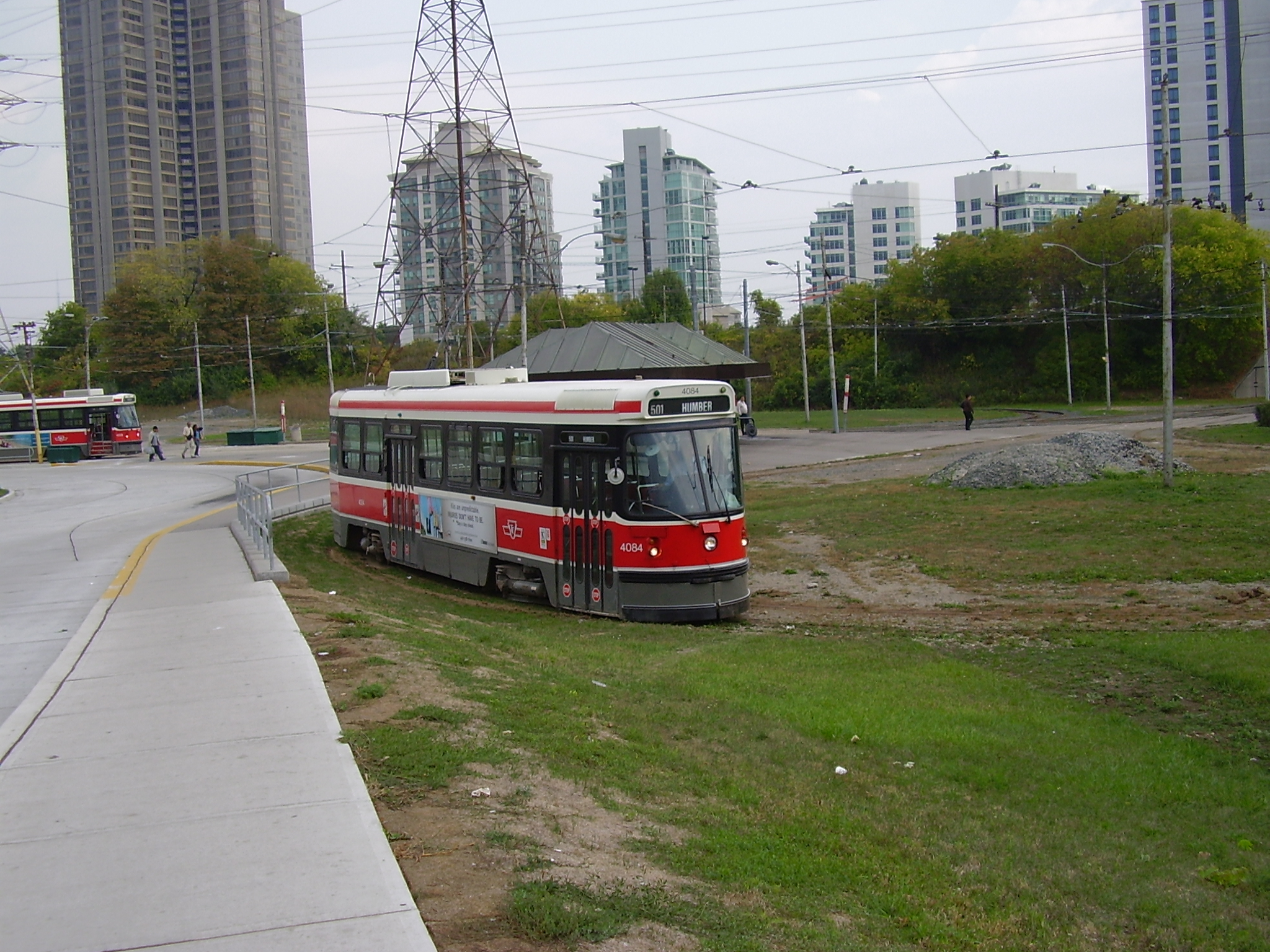
A CLRV turning in the Long Branch side of Humber Loop in 2007

On January 3, 2016, the 501 route was temporarily split into two sections at Humber Loop. As of June 23, 2019, the section west towards Long Branch Loop operates mainly with shorter Canadian Light Rail Vehicles (CLRVs), while the section east to Neville Park Loop operates using mostly low-floor accessible Flexity Outlook streetcars.

From January 8, 2017, streetcar service west of Roncesvalles Avenue was replaced by buses for about 15 months to accommodate various construction projects, including rebuilding the bridge carrying streetcar tracks over the Humber River. At Humber Loop, there were several construction tasks including replacing track and overhead, building a new substation, making platforms accessible to accommodate Flexity streetcars and replacing the passing siding on the west-to-east loop with a stub siding. On April 1, 2018, streetcars returned to operate between Sunnyside Loop and Humber Loop. On June 24, 2018, streetcar service between Humber Loop and Long Branch Loop returned with riders coming from the east being required to change streetcars at the loop.

For over two years starting March 31, 2021, Humber Loop was closed to streetcar traffic due to construction activity, including track replacement and an extension of the exclusive streetcar right-of-way on the Queensway west of Roncesvalles Avenue. Streetcar service at Humber Loop was restored for 501 Queen on October 29, 2023, and begun for 508 Lake Shore on October 30, 2023, and for 507 Long Branch on November 19, 2023. At that time, 301 Queen continued to operate overnight with temporary replacement buses.

== Future ==
The TTC plans to relocate the loop to Park Lawn Road where it will better serve development growth in the Humber Bay Shores area. Although preliminary design work has been done, the project has not been funded due to reductions in the capital program.

== Services ==
An enclosed waiting room is provided for passengers, as are separate facilities for operators. As of November 19, 2023, the TTC routes serving Humber Loop are:

Route	Destinations				Notes
501 Queen	Eastbound	To Neville Park Loop	Westbound	Terminus	
501 Queen	Eastbound	To Neville Park Loop	Westbound	To Long Branch Loop	Late evening service only
507 Long Branch	Eastbound	Terminus	Westbound	To Long Branch Loop	No late evening service
508 Lake Shore	Eastbound	To Distillery Loop	Westbound	To Long Branch Loop	Rush hours only
301 Queen	Eastbound	To Neville Park Loop	Westbound	To Long Branch Loop	Blue Night bus service replacing 501 streetcar
66A Prince Edward	Northbound	To Old Mill station	Southbound	Terminus	Bus route
