= 501 Queen =

Streetcar route in Toronto, Canada

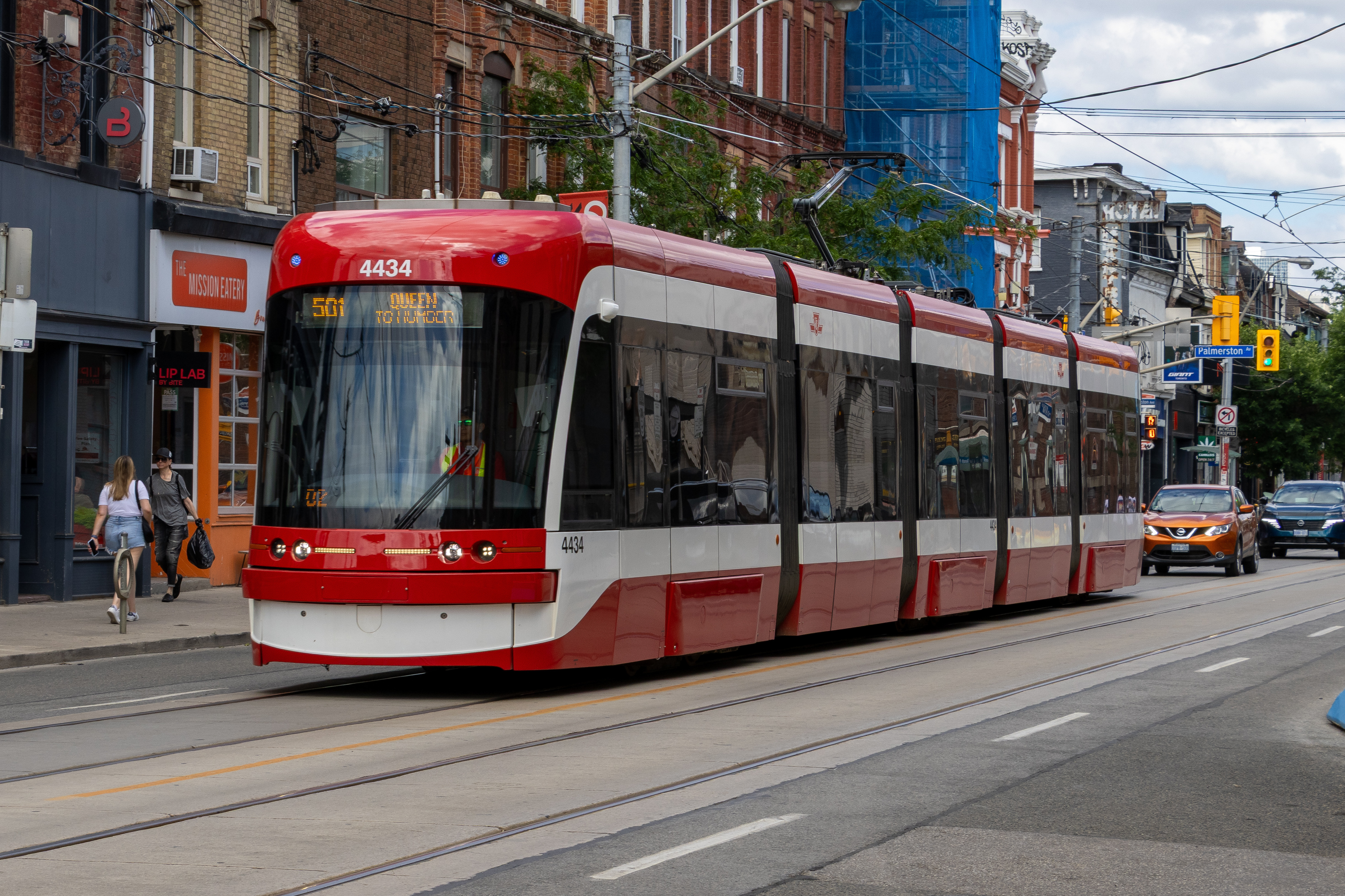
- 501 Queen streetcar

Overview
- Locale: Toronto, Ontario
- Termini: Neville Park Loop (east); Humber Loop (west); Long Branch Loop (late evening)
- Stations: Osgoode; Queen
- Website: Official route page

Service
- System: Toronto streetcar system
- Route number: 501 (301 overnight)
- Operator: Toronto Transit Commission
- Depot(s): Russell Carhouse, Roncesvalles Carhouse, Leslie Barns
- Rolling stock: Flexity Outlook
- Daily ridership: 46,116 (2022, weekdays)

History
- Opened: 1875; 151 years ago

Technical
- Line length: 16.9 km (10.5 mi) (Humber Loop); 24.6 km (15.3 mi) (Long Branch Loop)
- Track gauge: 4 ft 10 7/8 in (1,495 mm)
- Electrification: 600 V DC overhead

501 Queen (301 Queen during overnight periods) is an east–west Toronto streetcar route in Ontario, Canada, operated by the Toronto Transit Commission (TTC). It stretches from Neville Park Loop (just west of Victoria Park Avenue) in the east, running along Queen Street and in a reserved right-of-way within the median of the Queensway to Humber Loop in the west. In the late evenings, the 501 Queen route is extended west from Humber Loop, running on Lake Shore Boulevard to Long Branch Loop (just west of Browns Line, adjacent to Long Branch GO Station), replacing route 507 Long Branch. This route operates as part of the TTC's Blue Night Network service, operating in the early morning hours as the 301 Queen.

In 2022, with almost 12.8 million annual boardings, 501 Queen was the second busiest streetcar line in Toronto, after 504 King. (In 2019, prior to the drop in ridership due to the COVID-19 pandemic, there were 22.0 million annual boardings.)

== History ==
=== 1875–1999 ===
In 1875, the Kingston Road Tramway operated a horsecar service along what would become today's Queen Street East. This line was abandoned in the mid 1880s, at about which time the Toronto Street Railway extended its King horsecar line onto Queen Street East to Lee Avenue in the Beaches district. In 1893, the Toronto Railway Company electrified the line. In 1921, the TTC took over streetcar service.

From 1923 to 1928, the Beach streetcar line ran along Queen Street from Neville Park Boulevard to the Humber River similar to today's 501 Queen. At about this time, there was also a route named "Queen", but it ran along Kingston Road to McCaul and Queen streets much like the 502 Downtowner that ran until 2019.

From 1928 to 1937, service to the eastern and western ends of Queen Street was handled by separate routes. Thus, one would need to transfer streetcars in the downtown area to travel the full length of Queen Street.

On August 2, 1937, a new Queen route served all of Queen Street between Neville Park Loop and Parkside Loop. (The Parkside Loop was located at the northeast corner of Lakeshore Boulevard and Parkside Drive, south of the rail corridor, which was crossed by a bridge.) East of Roncesvalles Avenue, the Queen route resembled today's 501 Queen.

On September 14, 1940, the PCC streetcar was introduced on the Queen route on Sundays, displacing Peter Witt streetcars. PCCs were placed in Queen night service on October 3, 1940, and in regular daily service on May 1, 1941.

By 1954, when the Yonge subway (today part of Line 1 Yonge–University) opened, an underground streetcar station was partially built at Queen station to eventually allow streetcars to cross under the subway tracks. The plan was to put the Queen streetcar line in a tunnel under Queen Street between Logan Avenue and Trinity Park. However, because of changing ridership patterns, the plan was dropped in favour of east–west subway line along Bloor Street and Danforth Avenue (today's Line 2 Bloor–Danforth). Today, Lower Queen remains a ghost station.

In 1957, to accommodate construction of the Gardiner Expressway, the streetcar tracks were removed from Lake Shore Boulevard between Roncesvalles Avenue and the Humber River, and the bridge crossing the rail corridor was demolished. As a replacement, a new private right-of-way was built along the Queensway from the Sunnyside Loop to the Humber Loop. At the Humber Loop, passengers could transfer to the Long Branch streetcar which shuttled between the Humber and Long Branch loops.

Between 1967 and early 1977, two-car multiple-unit PCC trains served the Queen streetcar route.

Around early 1978, the TTC announced plans to number all of its streetcar routes (which had been known only by names), and the Queen Street route was to be number 501. The route number 501 began being displayed on streetcars' destination signs on February 4, 1980, when the Queen route was still operated entirely by PCC streetcars.

On March 26, 1995, the 507 Long Branch route was replaced by a westward extension of the 501 Queen route, resulting in the Queen route attaining a length of 24.6 kilometres (15.3 mi). In 2010, National Geographic described 501 Queen as one of the longest streetcar lines in North America. In 2012, a National Post article made a similar claim. In late 2023, a reinstated 507 route would be carved out of the 501 route, reducing the length of the latter except in late evening.

=== 2000–present ===
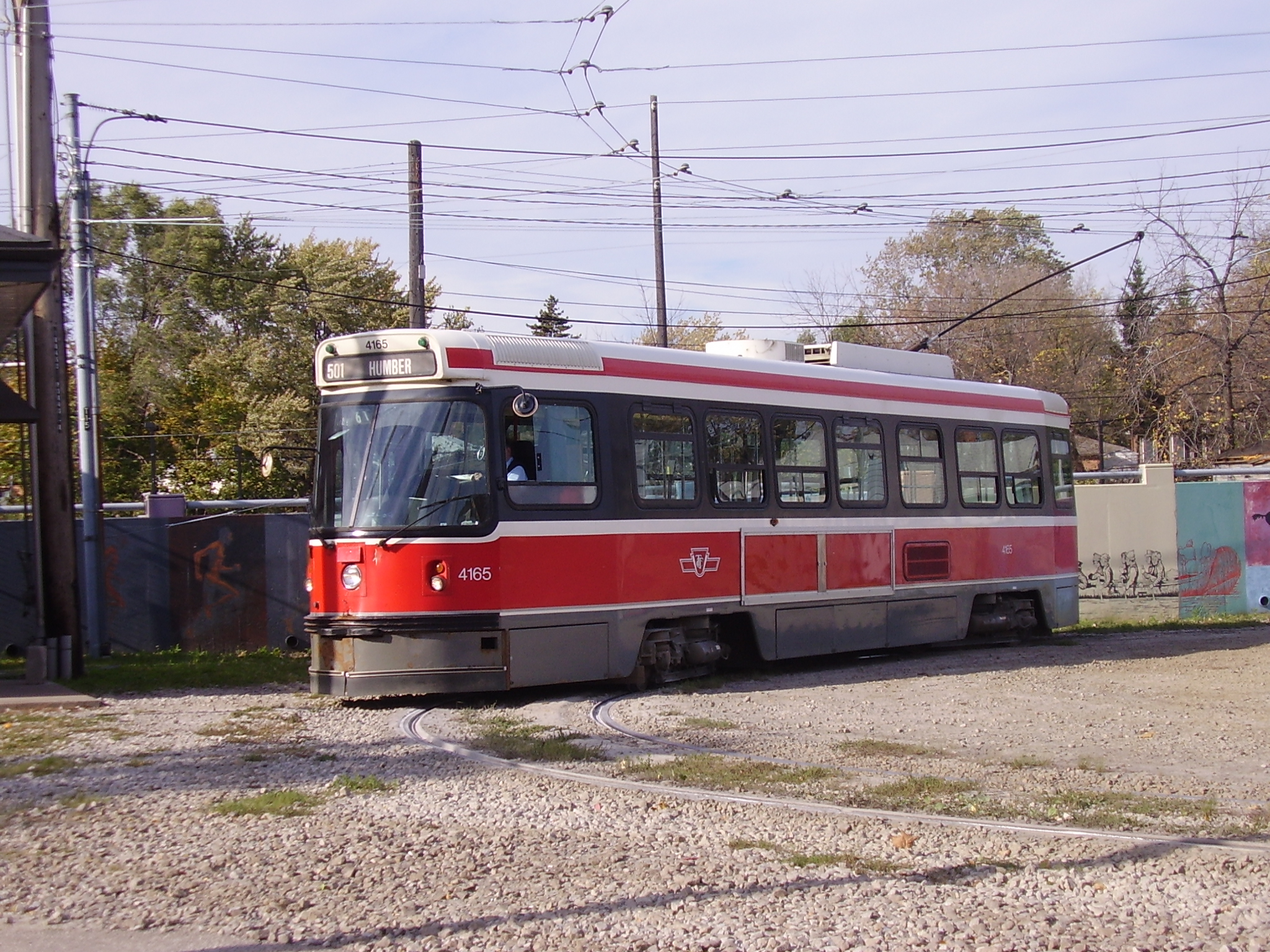
A CLRV car at Long Branch Loop

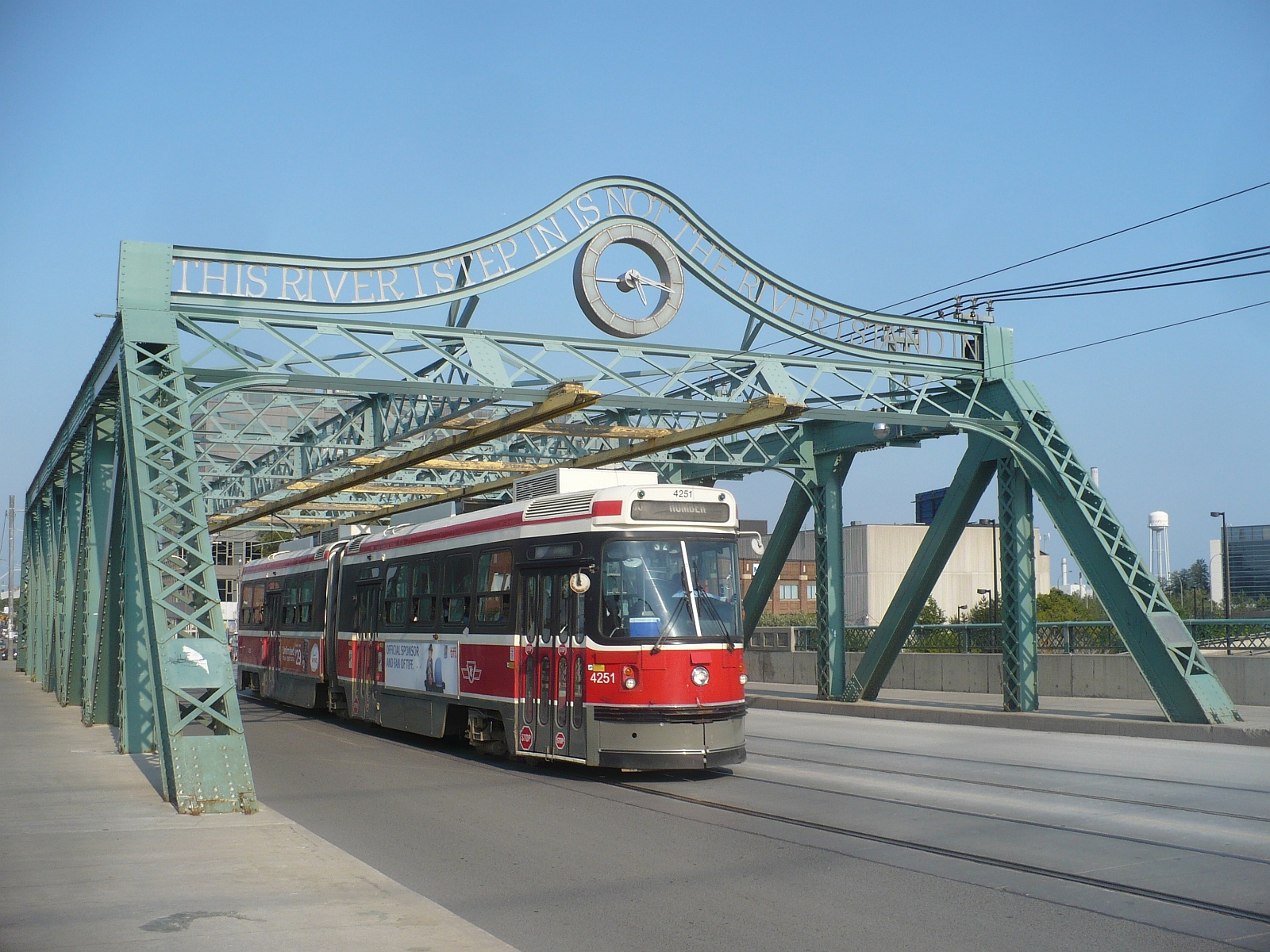
An ALRV car on 501 Queen crossing the Don River in Toronto in September 2011

In 2013, the TTC considered setting up a transit mall on the downtown portion of either Queen or King Street. TTC CEO Andy Byford wanted a car-free corridor along one of the city's two busiest streetcar lines (either 501 Queen or 504 King) to prevent bunching, gaps and service delays. Byford would ban general automobile traffic along the streetcar corridor but allow cyclists, taxicabs and delivery trucks. Byford preferred King Street for the transit mall because of recent condominium development along that street. There were similar proposals for a transit mall in 2001 and 2007. Ultimately, the King Street Transit Priority Corridor was established in late 2017.

On January 3, 2016, the 501 Queen route was split into two sections at Humber Loop in order to make its service more reliable. Effectively, the section west of Humber Loop became the 507 Long Branch route in all but name.

In January 2017, construction began for approximately 15 months on various projects west of Roncesvalles Avenue, including rebuilding the bridge over the Humber River carrying streetcar tracks. Other work included replacing track and overhead along portions of the Queensway and Lake Shore Boulevard as well as at the Humber Loop. Also at the Humber Loop, a new substation was built, platforms were made accessible to accommodate Flexity streetcars and a siding on the west-to-east loop was modified. In April 2018, streetcar operations resumed between Sunnyside Loop and Humber Loop. Streetcar service between Humber Loop and Long Branch Loop resumed in June 2018.

From May to September 2017, all streetcar service along the entire 501 Queen route was replaced by buses to permit multiple construction projects along Queen Street to take place, including the replacement of an overhead pedestrian walkway at the Eaton Centre, which required overhead wires to be removed. According to a TTC spokesperson, it took 65 buses to replace the 50 streetcars then operating east of the Sunnyside Loop.

Since March 31, 2021, the 501 Queen route has been partially closed due to construction activity, including track replacement and the extension of the exclusive streetcar right-of-way on the Queensway west of Roncesvalles Avenue. Also, the TTC was upgrading the streetcar overhead for pantographs. The result was that streetcar service was temporarily replaced by buses from Parliament Street to Long Branch Loop, with a diversion along King and Bathurst Streets to Wolseley Loop. Streetcar service was restored along Queen Street between Parliament and Bathurst Streets on February 13, 2022, to Dufferin Street on September 4, 2022, to Roncesvalles Avenue (Sunnyside Loop) on January 25, 2023 and to Humber Loop on October 29, 2023. Route 501 service to Long Branch Loop was scheduled to resume on November 19, 2023.

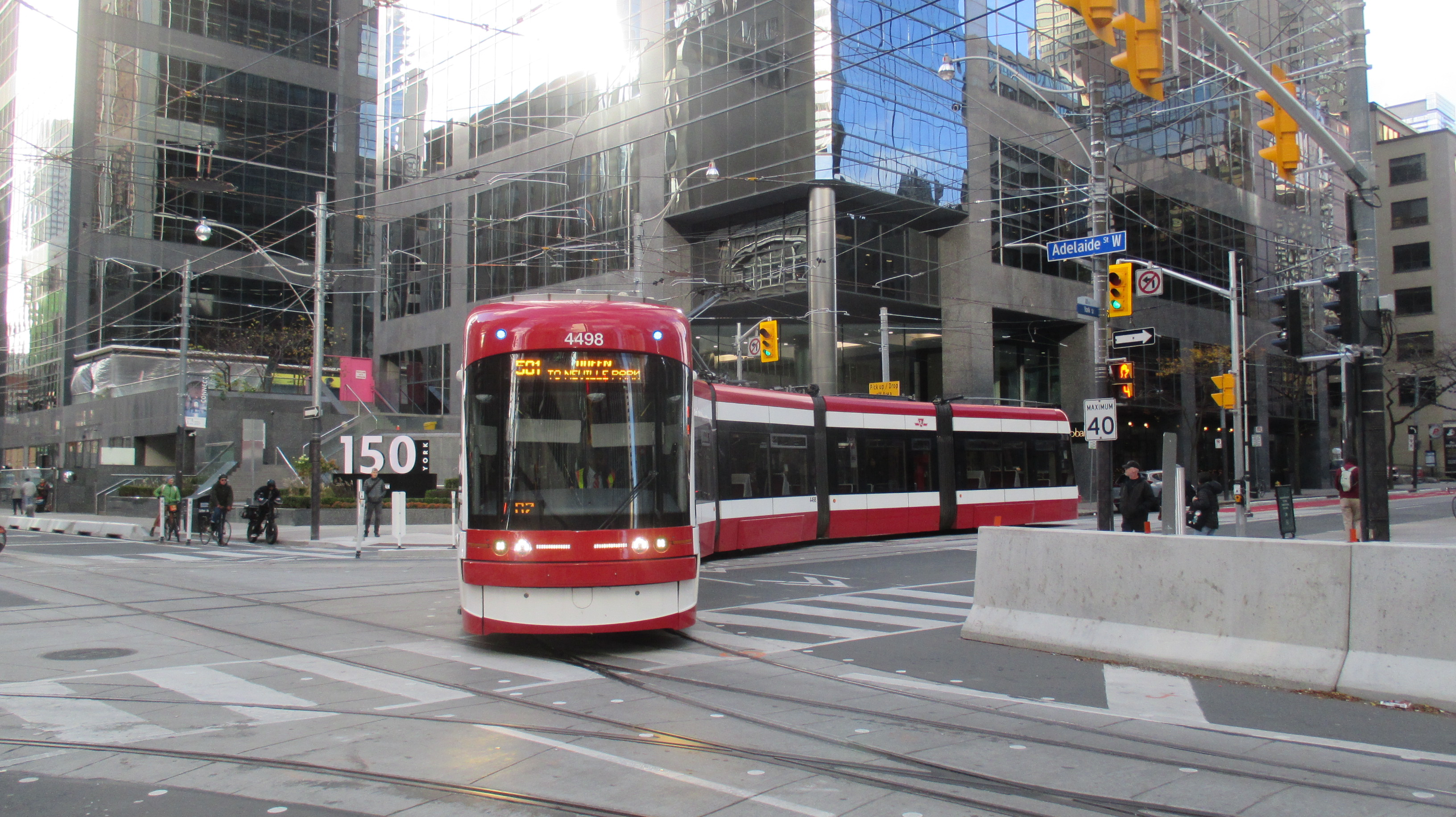
501 Queen on a long-term diversion eastbound at York & Adelaide Streets

On May 1, 2023, an estimated 4.5-year closure of Queen Street between Victoria and Bay Streets began to allow construction of the Ontario Line at Queen station. Initially, the TTC diverted 501 streetcars via McCaul Street, Dundas Street and Broadview Avenue. On September 3, 2023, the TTC split Queen streetcar service into eastern and western segments; 501A streetcars would run between Sunnyside Loop and McCaul Loop, and the diverted 505 Dundas streetcar route would be extended from Broadview Avenue to Neville Park Loop. On October 8, 2023, the TTC replaced the eastern segment of the split route with the 501D streetcar which would run east on Queen Street from Neville Park Loop, south on Church Street looping via Church, Wellington and York Streets, returning via King Street to Church Street. The TTC was planning to rejoin the two segments of the line using a new diversion between Church and York Streets, via Richmond Street westbound and Adelaide Street eastbound. By October 6, 2024, the TTC had published schedules for such a diversion. However, on that date, the TTC decided to provide a temporary diversion in both directions via Spadina Avenue, King Street and Church Street. On November 10, 2024, the TTC started operating the planned diversion route via Richmond and Adelaide Streets, with eastbound streetcars using new track on York and Adelaide Streets.

Effective November 19, 2023, the TTC reinstated route 507 Long Branch to run between Humber and Long Branch Loops, replacing the 501 Queen along Lake Shore Boulevard but only until late evening.

On March 31, 2024, 301 Queen night streetcar service resumed, ending replacement bus service between Long Branch and Neville Park Loops. However, due to Ontario Line construction, 301 streetcars had to divert via Spadina Avenue, King Street and Church Street.

=== Rolling stock ===
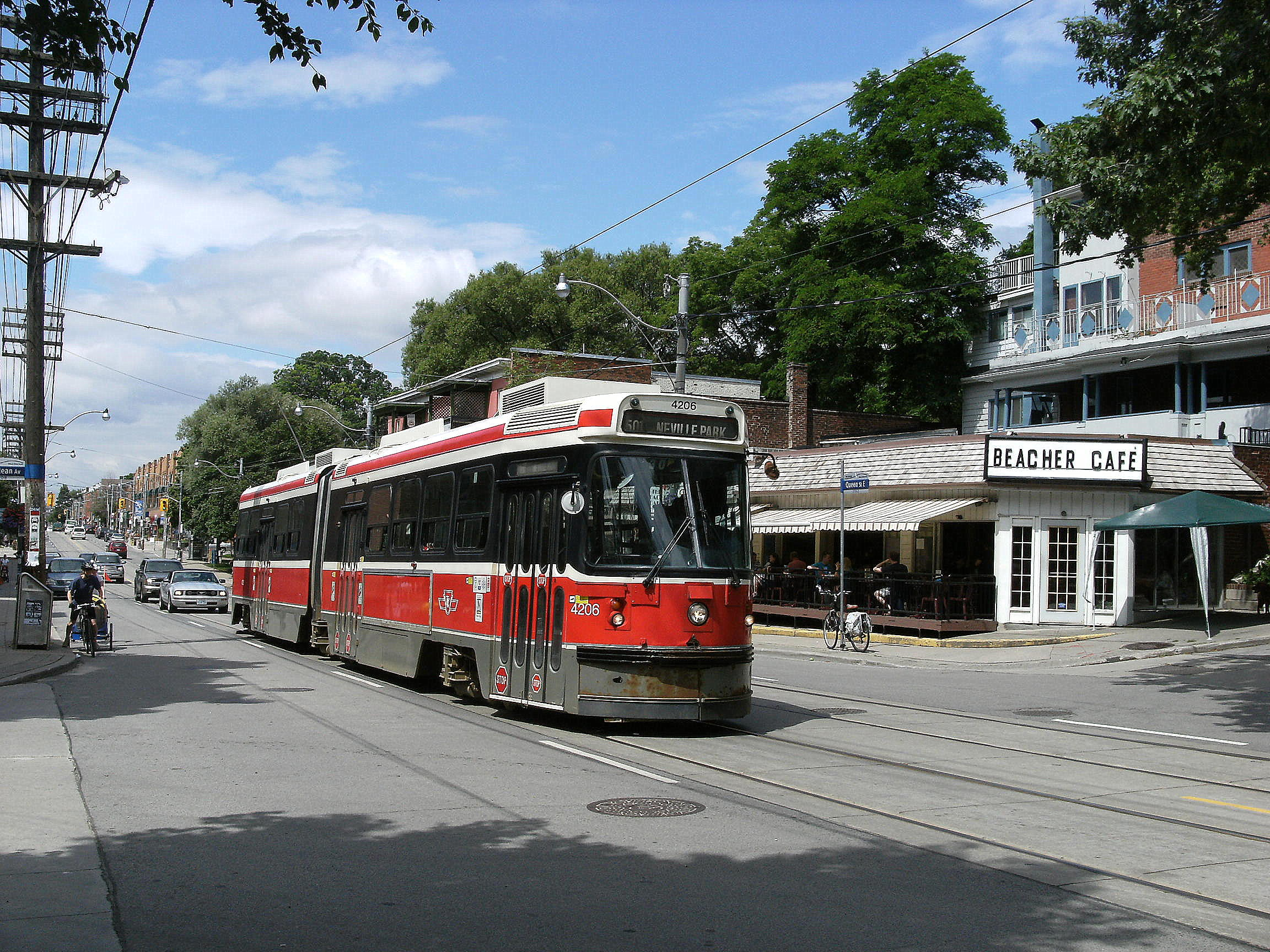
ALRVs once provided base service on 501 Queen (photo at Maclean Avenue)

Route 501 Queen was once served mainly by Articulated Light Rail Vehicles (ALRVs) and occasionally supplemented with some of the shorter Canadian Light Rail Vehicles (CLRVs). However, by 2018, the route was mainly served by CLRVs. This was due to the declining reliability and accelerated retirement of the ALRV fleet.

Flexity Outlook streetcars were introduced on the 501 Queen route in phases; weekend service using the Flexity vehicles along the route began in September 2018 and moved to full-time on January 6, 2019. The TTC had to address rush-hour crowding due to the accelerated retirement of the ALRV fleet, the last of which made their final voyages on September 2, 2019.

By June 23, 2019, the main portion of the route (along Queen Street and the Queensway between Humber Loop and Neville Park Loop) was the first to be fully served by Flexity Outlook streetcars; the southwest portion of the route (along Lake Shore Boulevard between Humber and Long Branch Loop) followed suit on September 1, 2019.

=== Route splitting ===
==== 2009 split ====
By 2007, critics of the TTC's management of this line argue that small delays at one end ripple into 30-40 minute waits at the other. Like route 504, there is much demand at either end of the route, and along the downtown middle stretch. Transit proponents such as Steve Munro have long claimed that Route 501 would be better off if it were split into two or three overlapping segments.

In late 2009, the TTC conducted an experiment of splitting the 501 streetcar route into two overlapping segments, as recommended by critics to alleviate bunching, gaps and short turns when delays occurred. During the experiment streetcars from the Neville Park Loop ran west on Queen Street as far as Shaw Street, and from Long Branch Loop or Humber Loop east as far as Parliament Street.

In January 2010, the commission received a report analyzing several of the experiments done in 2009 to increase service reliability. It was determined that splitting the route increased short turns by 90%, required more streetcars and resulted in poorer service. The TTC decided to use a route-management system called Step Forward, whereby when an operator goes off duty (break or end of shift), another operator takes over the streetcar instead of the streetcar going out of service along with off-duty operator. According to the TTC, Step Forward reduced short turns in late 2007, from 32.5% to 9.7% in the PM rush hours, and from 13.9% to 4.1% in the AM rush. It also was successful in reducing service gaps according to the TTC. Implementing Step Forward required eight extra operators and two extra supervisors.

==== 2016 split ====
By 2015, passengers were complaining about service on the 501 streetcar. Streetcars would often arrive at irregular intervals, causing unscheduled waits of 20–30 minutes. Streetcars would also do unscheduled short turns at Kingston Road or Roncesvalles Avenue, forcing passengers to exit and wait for the next streetcar. To address these problems and make service more predictable for riders, the TTC again split the 501 Queen route.

On January 3, 2016, the route was split into two sections at Humber Loop. The split was in effect only from 5 am to 10 pm. During the split, service over the entire route operated at intervals of ten minutes or better. The change was also made to provide more frequent service on each segment and to eliminate all but emergency short turns (such as for an accident) on the segment east of Humber Loop. Transfer-free service through Humber Loop was still provided by 3 runs in the morning, in the late evening and overnight. Some riders reported shorter streetcar wait times after the split.

The split was suspended starting from January 8, 2017, due to construction projects affecting Humber Loop. When streetcar service west of Humber Loop resumed on June 24, 2018, the split was reinstated. Initially, the TTC provided five transfer-free trips during the morning peak period; however, effective September 2, 2018, the TTC temporarily suspended these five runs due to a shortage of streetcars.

From June 21, 2020, most 501 Queen streetcars operated the full route between Neville Park and Long Branch loops. This ended the split in 501 Queen service at Humber Loop where passengers from Long Branch had to change streetcars to continue downtown.

== Route ==
From Neville Park Loop, the route proceeds westward in mixed traffic on Queen Street East. At Kingston Road, passengers can transfer to the 503 Kingston Rd streetcars. Further west, Broadview Avenue provides a transfer point to the 504 King streetcars to go along King Street.

Normally, the route continues west from Broadview Avenue along Queen Street, passing Queen station at Yonge Street and Osgoode station at University Avenue, where both stations serve subway Line 1 Yonge–University. However, construction of the Ontario Line necessitated the closure of Queen Street to all traffic between Church and Bay Streets from May 2023 until late 2027. Since May 2023, the TTC has used various diversions for 501 streetcars. On November 10, 2024, the 501 Queen started diverting around the construction site westbound via Richmond Street and eastbound via Adelaide Street, between York and Church Streets.

Further west at Spadina Avenue, riders can transfer to 510 Spadina streetcars and, at Bathurst Street, to 511 Bathurst streetcars. The route continues to the western end of Queen Street West at the intersection of King Street West and Roncesvalles Avenue, where riders can again transfer to 504 King streetcars.

West of Roncesvalles Avenue, Queen Street West flows onto the Queensway, where 501 Queen streetcars run in their own right-of-way until reaching the off-street Humber Loop. During the day and early evening, riders continuing to Long Branch must transfer to the 507 Long Branch streetcar. During late evening, 501 Queen streetcars continue westbound to Long Branch Loop, replacing the 507 streetcars. West of Humber Loop, the line passes through a short streetcar tunnel under a railway corridor and the Gardiner Expressway. The line emerges from the tunnel onto Lake Shore Boulevard West and proceeds westward in mixed traffic to Long Branch Loop, where both the 507 and late evening 501 streetcars terminate.

=== 507 Long Branch ===
Route 507 Long Branch is a streetcar route running along Lake Shore Boulevard West between Humber Loop and Long Branch Loop. It was created on October 28, 1935, merged into an extended 501 Queen on March 26, 1995 and reinstated as a separate route on November 19, 2023.

Route 507 Long Branch operates daily until late evening, when 501 Queen service is extended west from Humber Loop to Long Branch Loop, replacing 507 service. Overnight, night route 301 Queen replaces both 507 Long Branch and 501 Queen.

=== Sites along the line ===
From east to west:

- The Beaches
- Moss Park and Moss Park Armoury
- Toronto Eaton Centre
- Old City Hall
- Toronto City Hall and Nathan Phillips Square
- Osgoode Hall
- Four Seasons Centre
- 299 Queen Street West (Home to MuchMusic, Bell Media)
- Trinity Bellwoods Park
- Centre for Addiction and Mental Health
- Drake Hotel
- Gladstone Hotel
- Parkdale
- High Park
- Humber Bay Park
- Colonel Samuel Smith Park
- Humber College, Lakeshore Campus

== In popular culture ==
Toronto's Brickworks Ciderhouse produces a semi-sweet cider called the "Queen Street 501" which is an homage to the streetcar route, as well as Queen Street in general.

== See also ==
- The Queensway § Streetcar right-of-way used by 501 Queen
