= Roncesvalles Carhouse =

Storage and maintenance facility for streetcars in Toronto, Canada

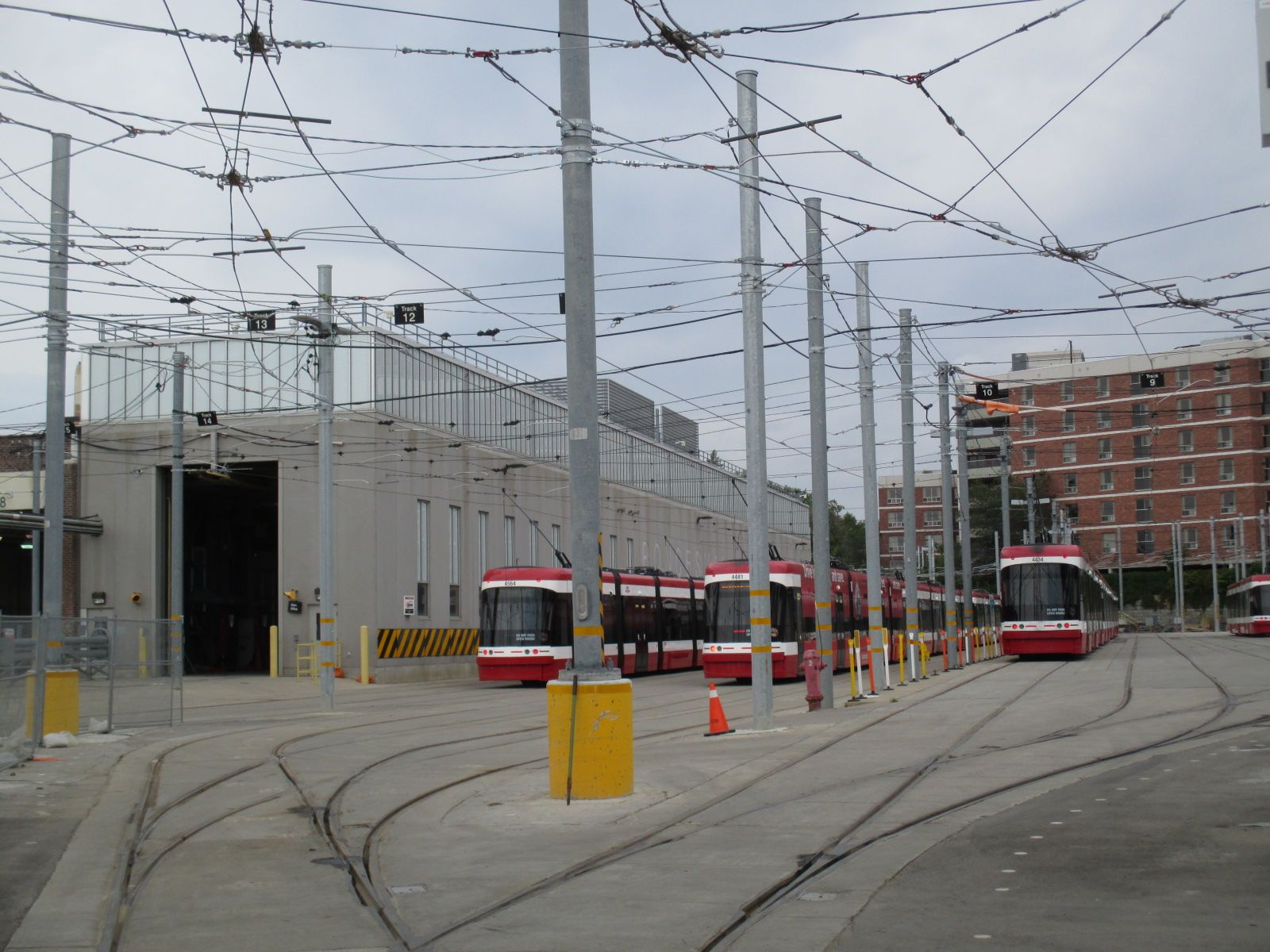
- Maintenance building for Flexity Outlook streetcars

General information
- Location: 20 The Queensway; Toronto, Ontario; Canada
- Coordinates: 43°38′22″N 79°26′52″W
- Operator: Toronto Transit Commission

Construction
- Structure type: Streetcar carhouse, maintenance and storage facility

History
- Opened: 22 January 1895
- Rebuilt: 1921
Location

The Roncesvalles Carhouse is a storage and maintenance facility for the streetcar network of the Toronto Transit Commission. Located at the northwest corner of the Queensway and Roncesvalles Avenue in Toronto, Ontario, west of its downtown core, it is the oldest of the TTC's three active carhouses. The carhouse serves vehicles on routes 501 Queen, 504 King, 505 Dundas, 506 Carlton, 511 Bathurst, and 512 St. Clair.

== Description ==
Plan of Roncesvalles Carhouse
- November 1995

The yard has 28 tracks numbered from east (track 1) to west (track 29). (One track was eliminated when the LFLRV repair bay was built at the location of tracks 16 and 17 in 2013.) Exterior tracks 1 to 15 and the LFLRV repair bay track all face north while the other tracks face south. The carhouse has four "barns" which are from east to west: the LFLRV repair bay, Inspection Bay 2 (tracks 18-20), Inspection Bay 1 (tracks 21-23), Repair Bay (tracks 24-25). Tracks 24 and 25 are the only stub-end tracks within the shop buildings. Track 20 has a carwash. A boiler room is near the south-west corner of the carhouse building. A sub-station is located near the north-east corner of the yard between track 1 and Roncesvalles Avenue. The traffic office is at the south-east corner beside track 5.

Yard entrances/exits are on the Queensway and Roncesvalles Avenue. The Roncesvalles Avenue entrance in conjunction with the special work at the intersection of Queen Street, King Street, the Queensway and Roncesvalles Avenue can serve streetcars from and to any street at that intersection. The Queensway entrance cannot serve streetcars to or from Humber Loop.

== History ==
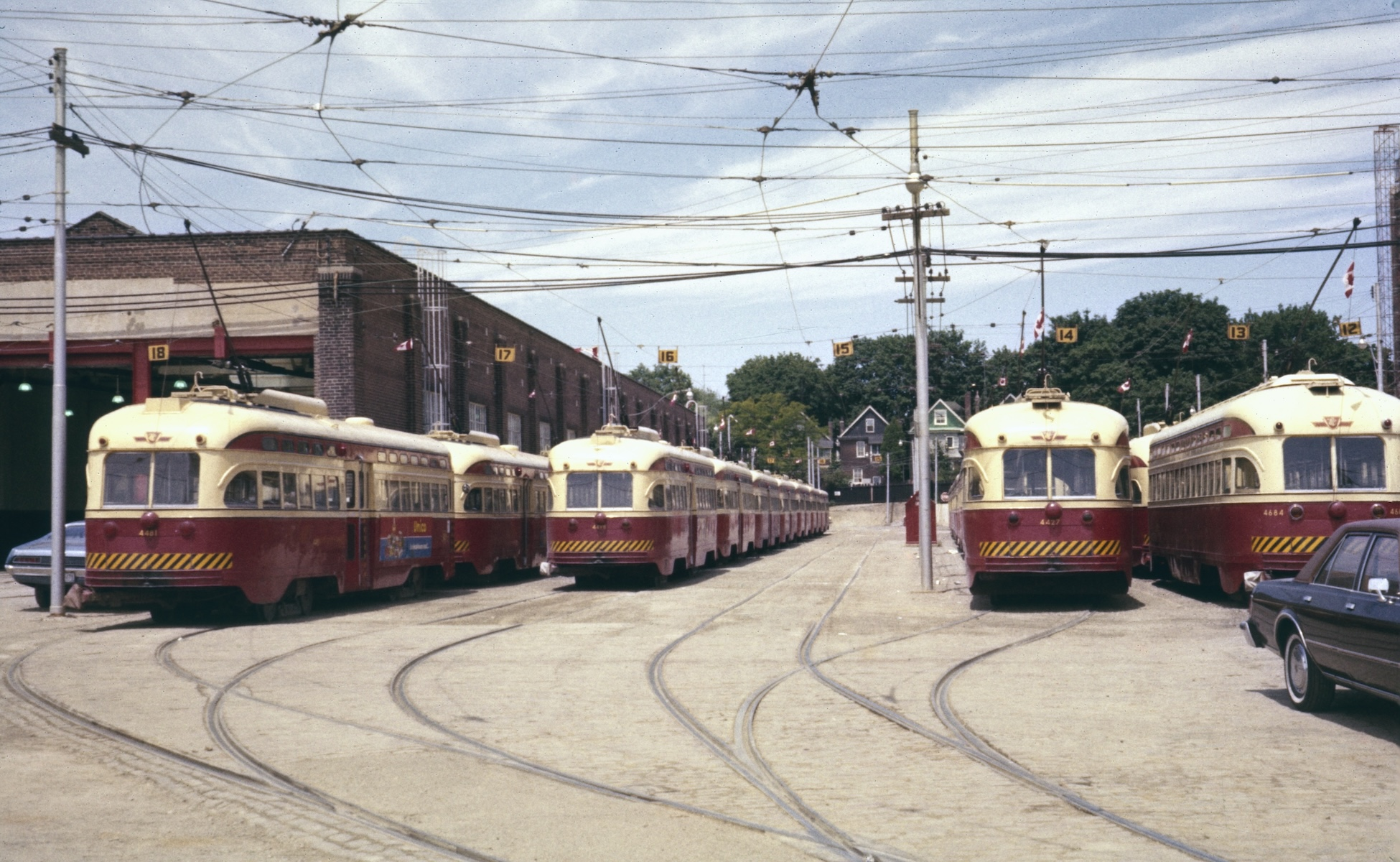
The yard in 1978, filled with PCC streetcars

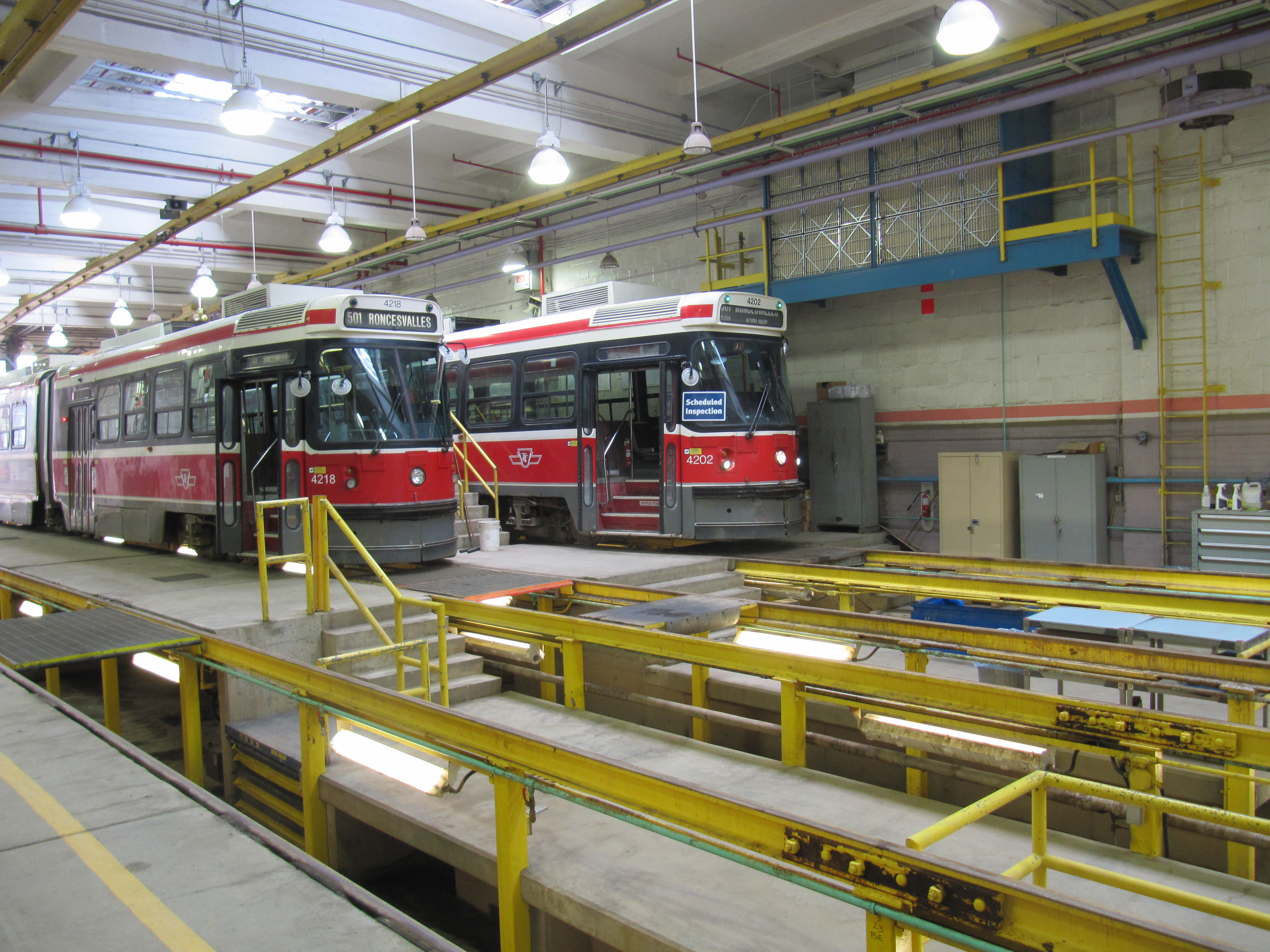
ALRVs in the inspection bays (2011)

The Toronto Railway Company opened the Roncesvalles Carhouse on January 22, 1895. It was located facing Roncesvalles Avenue on the west side of the street just north of Queen Street. Like most other TRC facilities maintenance had been deferred as its contract with the city came up for renewal. When the City took over streetcar operations in 1921, its new transit agency, the Toronto Transportation Commission, determined the existing facilities should be torn down and replaced. The replacement carhouse opened in 1923, with the tracks realigned north-south.

In 1927, the TTC took over operation of the Port Credit radial line which at that time ran west from Humber Loop. After converting the line from standard gauge to the streetcar system's broader gauge, the TTC closed the old Toronto and York Radial Railway carhouse near Grenadier Pond, and housed the Port Credit radial cars at the Roncesvalles Carhouse. This arrangement continued until February 9, 1935 when the Port Credit radial (then running west from the Long Branch Loop) was permanently replaced by bus service.

By 2013, 26,000 square feet (2,400 m^{2}) of new maintenance capabilities were added to the carhouse to handle the new low-floor Flexity streetcars introduced in 2014. Unlike the TTC's legacy streetcar fleet, where the vehicle's serviceable parts were under the floor, the low-floor vehicles house the serviceable parts above the ceiling. This requires a different infrastructure for servicing and maintaining the vehicles. As an addition to the Roncesvalles structure, the TTC added a new one-track service bay capable of providing some maintenance for the new low-floor streetcar vehicles. This was the only facility built to service the first of the new vehicles in service, before the Leslie Carhouse opened, in 2016.

In February 2018, Roncesvalles Carhouse closed for major construction work with all streetcars operating from this carhouse being moved to Russell Carhouse and Leslie Barns. In January 2019, Roncesvalles Carhouse partially reopened to service some of the Flexity Outlook streetcars used on routes 501 Queen, 504 King and 512 St. Clair. The carhouse returned to full capacity after completion of all remaining work. The work included:

- Special work on the north side of the yard, which was at the end of its useful life and was replaced.
- Within inspection bay 1, interior tracks 21–23 were replaced, and interior obstructions removed in order to accommodate Flexity Outlook streetcars. Provision was made for a high level platform. Also, the north end of inspection bay 1 was extended.
- Track 6 (on the east side of the yard) was extended to allow for additional storage.
- Tracks 3 and 4 were reinstated to provide more space, and tracks 1 to 4 were all extended southward to join track 5.
- OCS poles supporting the overhead wires were replaced to allow for pantograph operation.

In separate instances in August 2019 and January 2020, a streetcar going along the S-curve at the middle of the north end of the yard hurled its trolley pole shoe through the window of a nearby building outside the yard. The TTC suspected the cause of the two incidents was speed and perhaps an improper attachment of the shoe to the trolley pole. The shoe is made of brass and weighs 1.4–1.8 kilograms (3–4 lb). To prevent further incidents, the TTC has since required drivers to go around the S-curve at 5 km/h (3.1 mph) with the pantograph raised and the trolley pole lowered.

== Sunnyside Loop ==
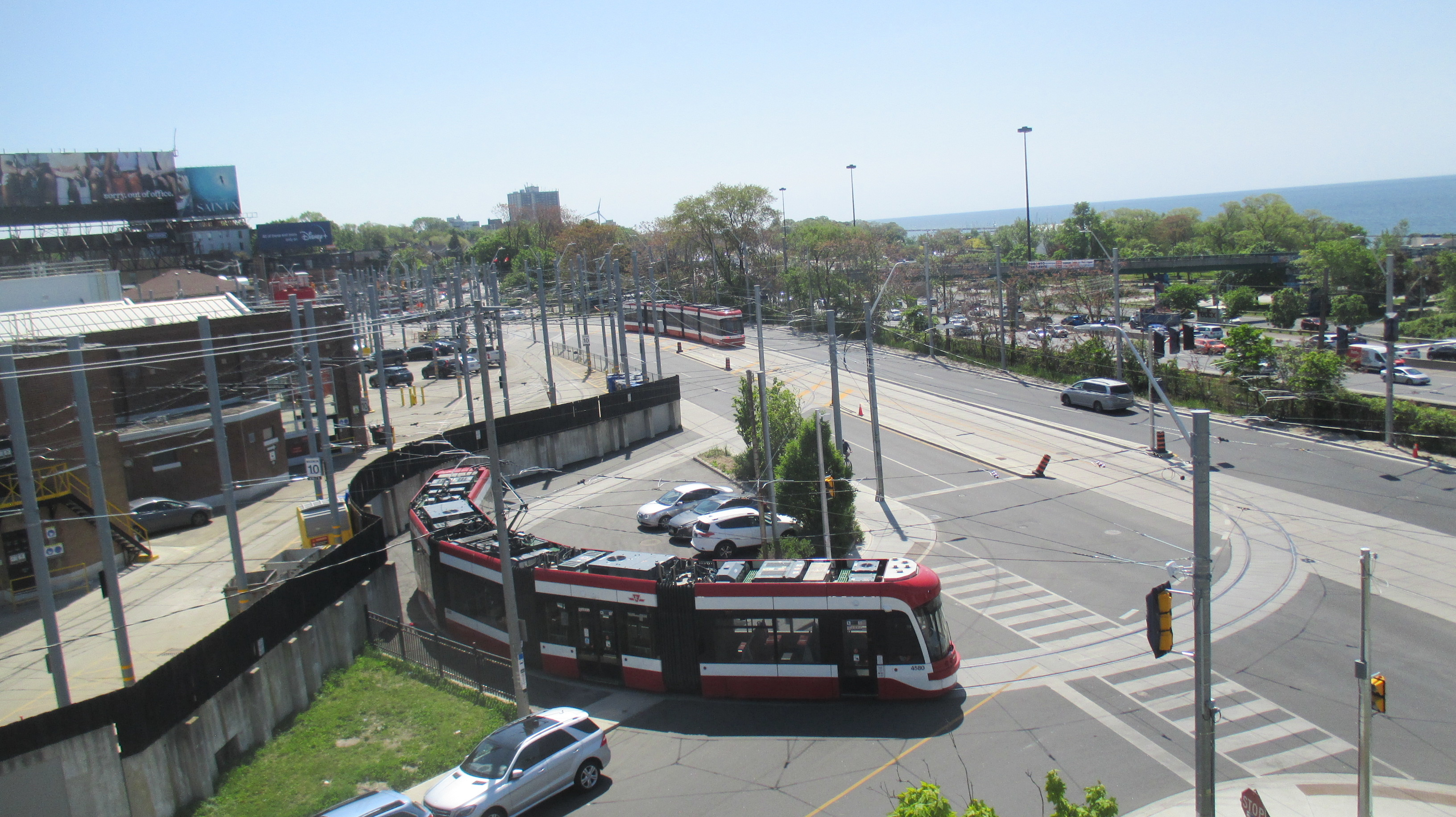
Sunnyside Loop

This is an anticlockwise streetcar loop, exterior to the southwest corner of the carhouse property. It is used to turn back westbound 501 Queen and 504 King streetcars, which can only enter the loop westbound from the Queensway and exit southbound on Sunnyside Avenue to return eastbound.

== See also ==
- Sunnyside Bus Terminal, a Gray Coach facility that operated from 1936 to 1990 next to Roncesvalles Carhouse
