= Neville Park Loop =

Terminus of Toronto 501 streetcar line

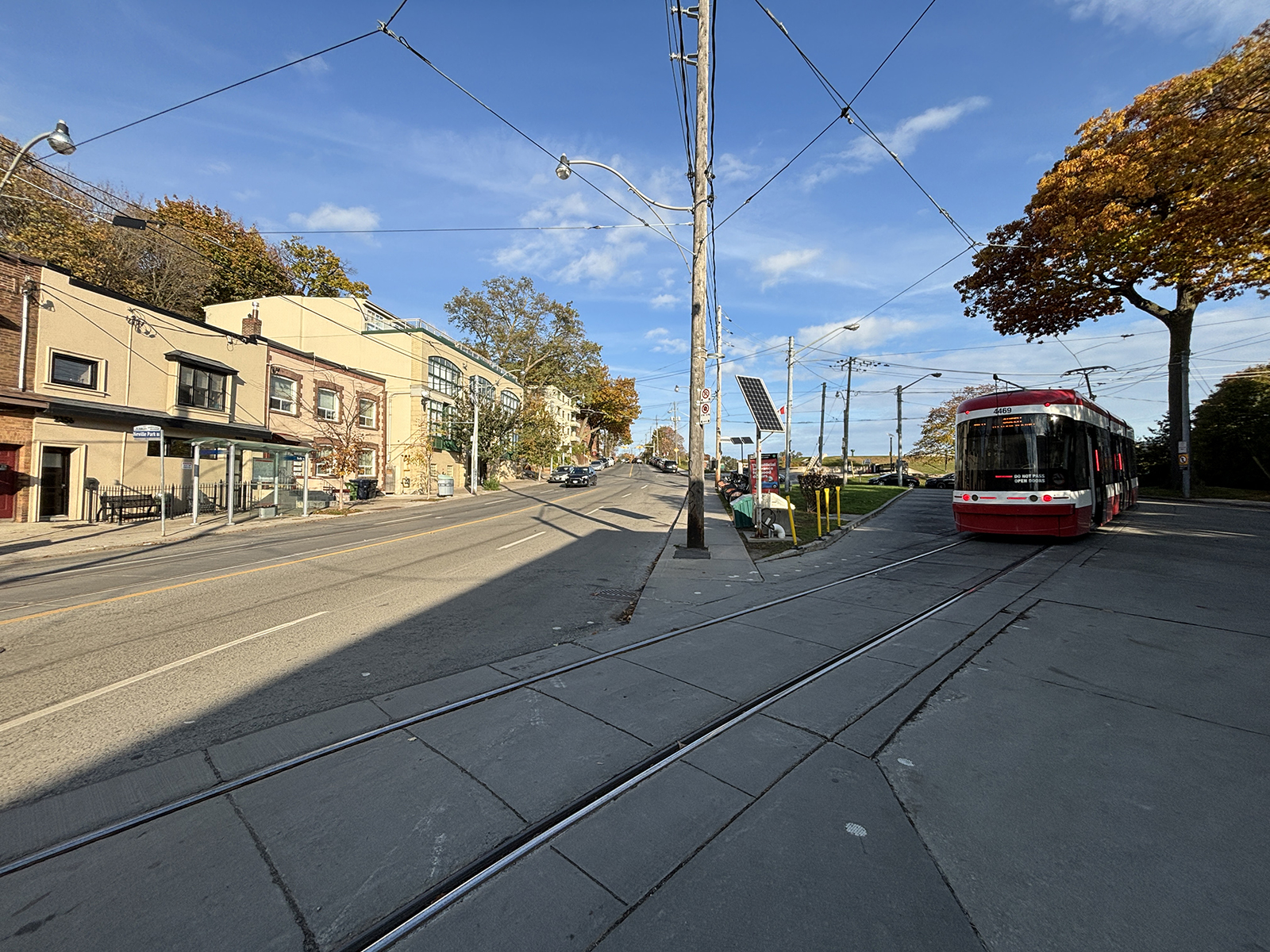

General information
- Location: Queen Street East at Nursewood Road; Toronto, Ontario; Canada
- Coordinates: 43°40′25.5″N 79°16′53″W
- Owner: Toronto Transit Commission

History
- Opened: July 2, 1922; 104 years ago
- Rebuilt: August 13, 1967; 59 years ago
Location

Neville Park Loop is the eastern terminus of the 301/501 Queen streetcar line, the longest streetcar route of the Toronto Transit Commission (TTC). It is also the terminus of the 143 Beaches/Downtown express bus service. It is located at the southwest corner of Queen Street East and Nursewood Road in the Beaches neighbourhood of Toronto. It is named after the street which is just west of the loop.

Streetcars enter eastbound and loop anticlockwise to exit at Nursewood Road and turn north to Queen Street where they return westbound.

== History ==
In 1914, the Toronto Railway Company built a wye at the eastern end of the streetcar line along Queen Street East. The wye was between Nursewood Road and Neville Park Boulevard near the eastern boundary of the old City of Toronto at the western boundary of Scarborough, Ontario. Service began at Neville Park on December 24, 1914.

In 1921, the newly created Toronto Transportation Commission took over and amalgamated existing streetcar systems within the old city limits. As part of a modernization program, the TTC decided to replace wyes with turning loops to improve operational efficiency at the end of the line. (The TTC's predecessor, the Toronto Railway Company preferred wyes at the end of line.)

On July 2, 1922, the TTC opened the Neville Park Loop to replace the old TRC wye. However, the TTC retained some of the old wye as a tail track south of Queen Street on Neville Park Boulevard. An eastbound streetcar could access this track only by backing in. In May 1989, the tail track was severed from the rest of the system. Some of the severed portion of this wye remains visible on Neville Park Boulevard, several metres south of Queen Street.

The original loop was located completely off-street at the northwest corner of Queen Street and Nursewood Road; that is, the loop did not touch Nursewood Road. The loop was rebuilt in 1967. When it re-opened on August 13, 1967, it now extended into Nursewood Road to accommodate two-car, multiple-unit PCC trains which had operated through the loop for 10 years. The rebuilt loop had a longer off-street area to hold an entire PCC train.

== Services ==
Although this is the terminus for 301/501 Queen streetcars, there is no passenger access to the loop. The first westbound stop is immediately opposite on the north side of Queen Street and the last stop eastbound is at Neville Park Boulevard. The 301/501 Queen streetcars then proceed westbound, following their route, usually towards Humber Loop or Long Branch Loop.

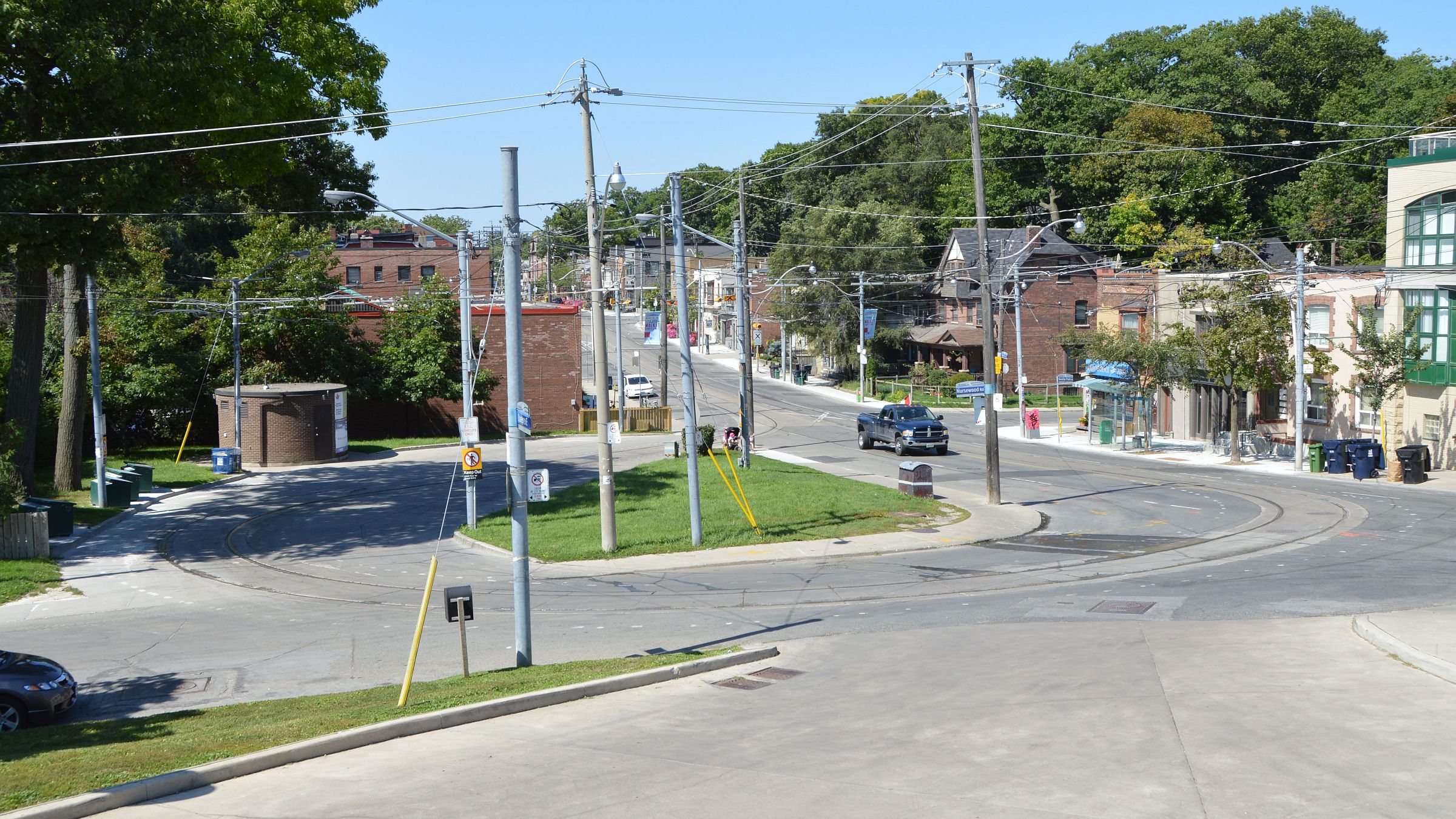
Overview of Neville Park Loop at the southwest corner of Queen Street East and Nursewood Road
