= 510 Spadina =

Streetcar route in Toronto, Canada

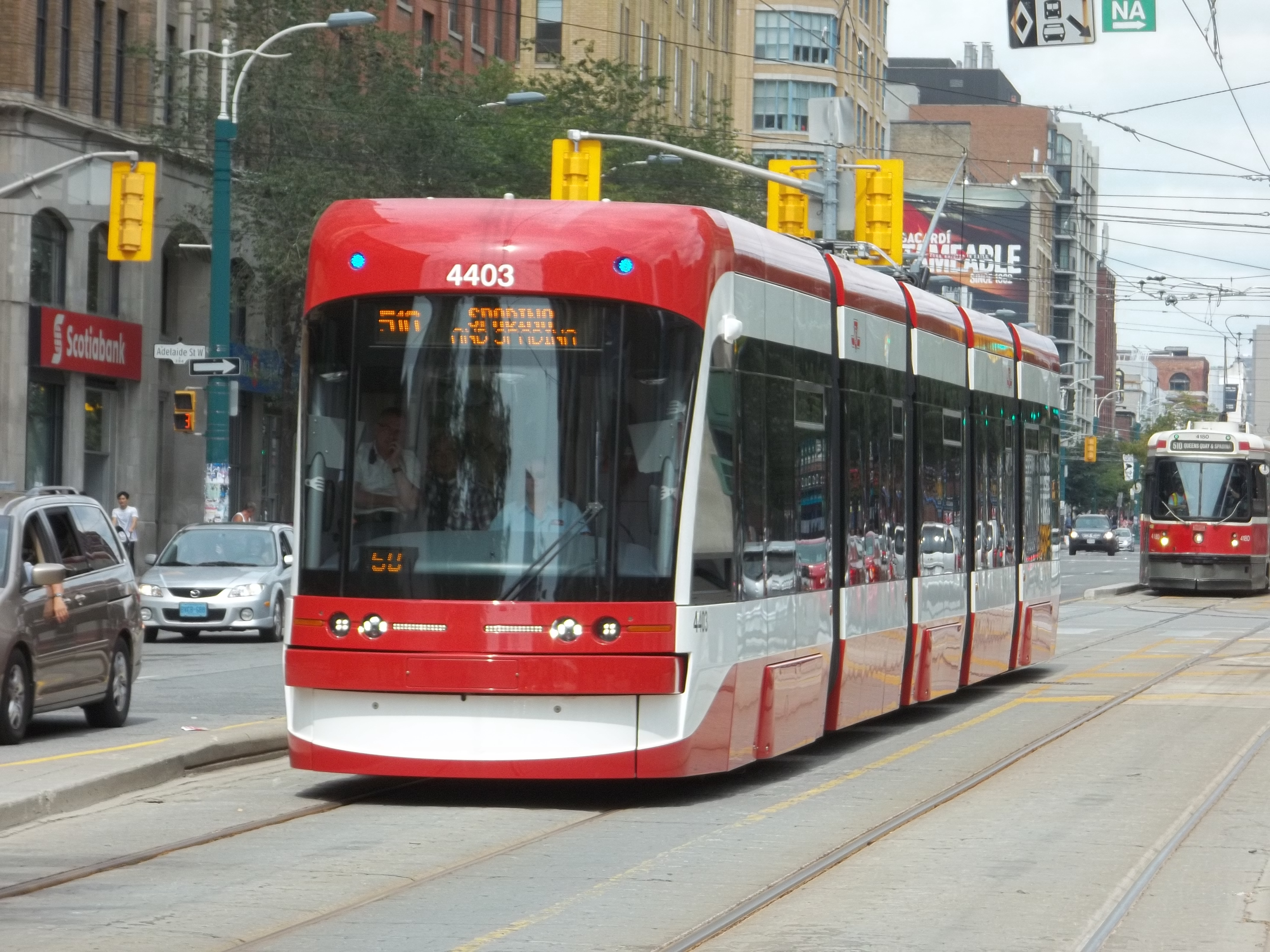
- Flexity Outlook streetcar on Spadina Avenue

Overview
- Locale: Toronto, Ontario
- Termini: Spadina station (north); King Street (south) for 510C Queens Quay and Spadina (south) for 510B Union station (south) for 510A
- Stations: Spadina; Union
- Website: Official route page

Service
- Type: Streetcar route
- System: Toronto streetcar system
- Route number: 510 (310 overnight)
- Operator: Toronto Transit Commission
- Depot: Leslie Barns
- Rolling stock: Flexity Outlook
- Daily ridership: 29,400 (2025, weekdays)

History
- Opened: 1878; 148 years ago

Technical
- Line length: 5.4 km (3.36 mi)
- Track gauge: 4 ft 10 7/8 in (1,495 mm)
- Electrification: 600 V DC overhead

510 Spadina (310 Spadina during overnight periods) is a Toronto streetcar route in Ontario, Canada, operated by the Toronto Transit Commission. The line started operating in 1990 and was extended in 1997; overnight service was reinstated in 2015.

== History ==
=== Earlier routes ===
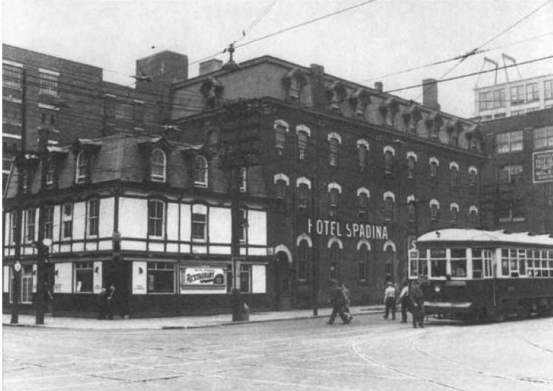
A double-ended streetcar on the original Spadina line, beside the Spadina Hotel on King Street

Streetcar service on Spadina Avenue began in 1878 as a horsecar line operated by the Toronto Street Railway. In 1891, the Toronto Railway Company created a route called the Belt Line that ran as a loop along Spadina Avenue, Bloor Street, Sherbourne Street, and King Street. In 1923, the Toronto Transportation Commission reconfigured the streetcar network, discontinuing the Belt Line and creating Spadina as a separate streetcar route. The Spadina route operated until 1948, when it was replaced by buses. The tracks on Spadina between Dundas Street and Harbord Street were used by the Harbord streetcar route until its discontinuation in 1966, after which, only the tracks between King and College streets were retained for diversions along Spadina Avenue.

=== Modern route ===
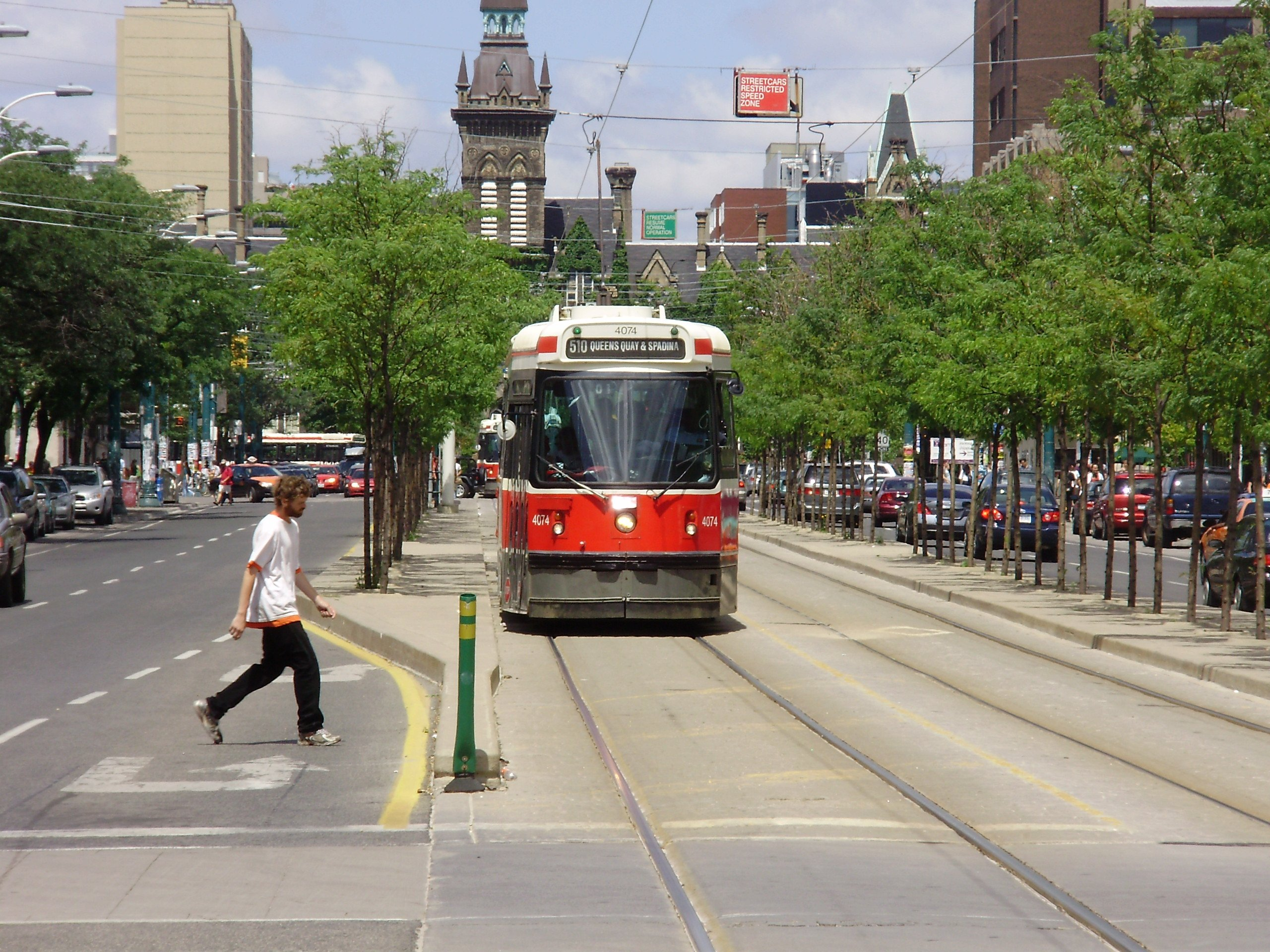
A CLRV car travels south on Spadina, south of College Street

The modern 510 Spadina route began as the 604 Harbourfront LRT route along Queens Quay in 1990, using CLRV and ALRV streetcars. The route was later renamed the 510 Harbourfront. It became the 510 Spadina and replaced the 77 Spadina bus when a new dedicated right-of-way was opened in 1997. The right-of-way extended the track north along Spadina Avenue from Queens Quay to Spadina station on Line 2 Bloor–Danforth.

The term "light-rail transit" (LRT), which had been adopted to project an image of modernity, was dropped when it led to residents and newspaper reporters imagining elevated guideways like those of the Scarborough RT running through their streets. It was found that the project was much easier to sell to the public and politicians when it was described as an improvement to the speed and reliability of traditional streetcar service.

In 2000, when the Queens Quay streetcar tracks were extended west to Bathurst and Fleet Streets, the name Harbourfront reappeared for a 509 Harbourfront route between Union station and Exhibition Loop. The 509 and 510 routes share the trackage that had been used by the 604.

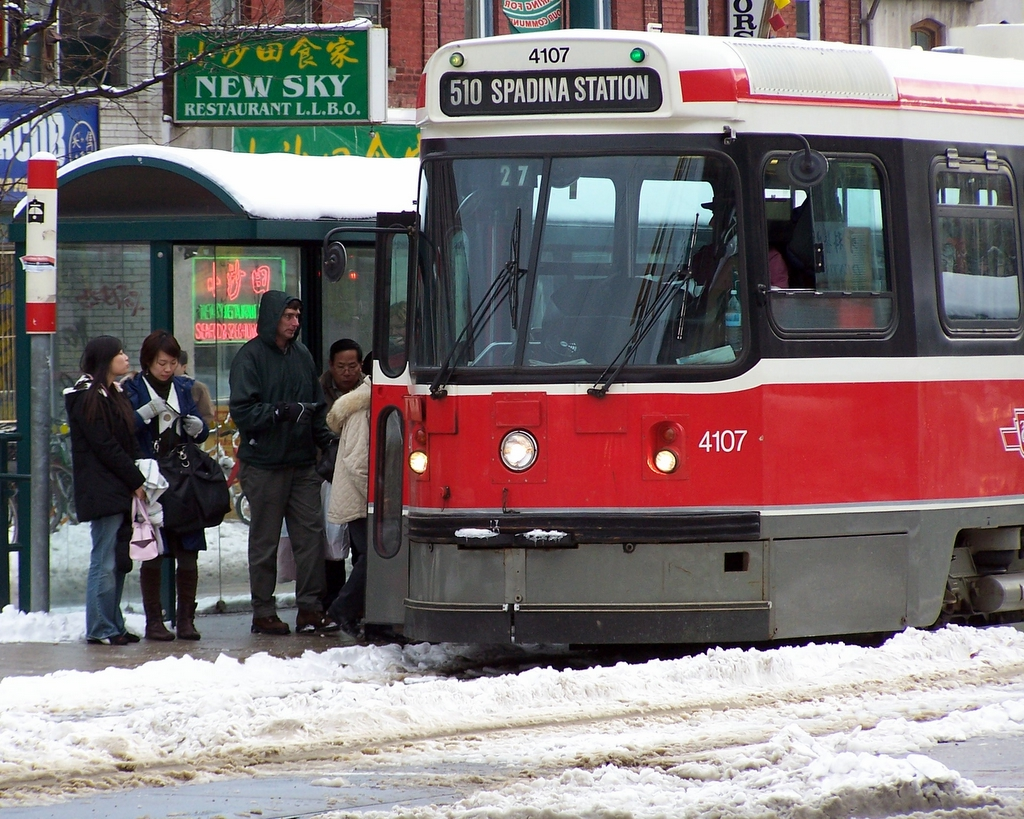
A CLRV streetcar on a winter day on the 510 Spadina line

In 2005, The Globe and Mail newspaper published an article that criticized the switch to a dedicated right-of-way streetcar as being less beneficial than promised. Based on TTC documents, the author argued that service is about one minute slower (from Queens Quay to Bloor) during afternoon rush hour than in 1990. The author also cited TTC documents which show that the cost-to-revenue ratio of the route has fallen with the switch from buses to streetcars. Mitch Stambler, the TTC's manager of service planning, responded by pointing out that streetcars offer a smoother and quieter ride, zero emissions, and economic development.

Ridership increased from 26,000 per day on the 77 bus route to 35,000 per day on the Spadina streetcar in 2004 and to over 45,000 per day between 2005 and 2006. Streetcars on the Spadina portion run every 2 to 3 minutes every day.

On December 15, 2008, the next vehicle arrival notification system was installed for the 510 streetcar in Spadina and Union stations. The next vehicle arrival notification system includes a display screen that shows the location of the streetcars in "real" time with a delay of one minute.

On June 18, 2012, all streetcar service on the line was suspended and replaced by buses. This was to allow major track work to be completed in preparation for the TTC's new low-floor Bombardier Transportation custom-made Flexity Outlook streetcars which were scheduled to enter service on the Spadina line in 2014. The upgrades were completed and full streetcar service was restored two years later on August 31, 2014, including a ceremony at 10:00 am when the first two accessible low-floor Flexity vehicles officially entered revenue service.

On September 6, 2015, after a 13-year absence, the TTC reinstated its overnight service on this route. The night service was designated first as 317 Spadina (based on the overnight equivalent from the 77 Spadina bus era) before being renumbered 310 Spadina on September 3, 2017 (to better align with the current overnight equivalent of the 510 Spadina line), and was part of the expanded Blue Night Network streetcar services resulting from a $95 million investment from Toronto City Council. During overnight periods, streetcars operate approximately every 30 minutes. The TTC had operated an overnight service using buses on Spadina from 1987 until 1992 when it was discontinued due to a series of cutbacks in TTC service.

On May 14, 2018, 510 Spadina became the second streetcar route in Toronto (after 509 Harbourfront) to use a pantograph instead of the trolley pole for electrical pickup.

On May 10, 2021, service was shortened to operate along Spadina Avenue from Spadina station to Queens Quay and Spadina only, to allow for an increase of service along the line. However, the 310 Spadina Blue Night service remains unchanged and continues to operate from Spadina station to Union station. On September 5, 2021, service to Union station resumed.

== Route ==
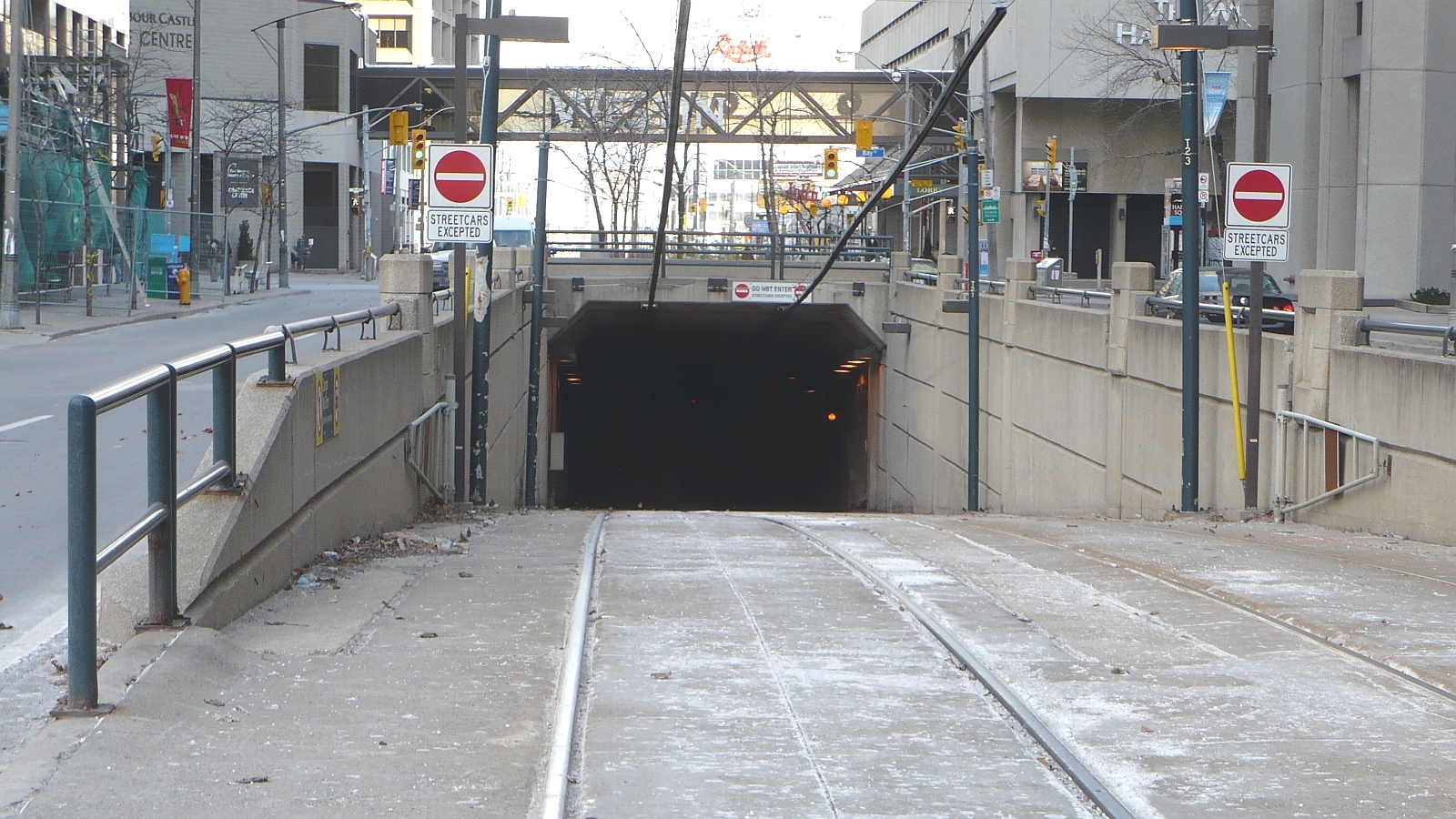
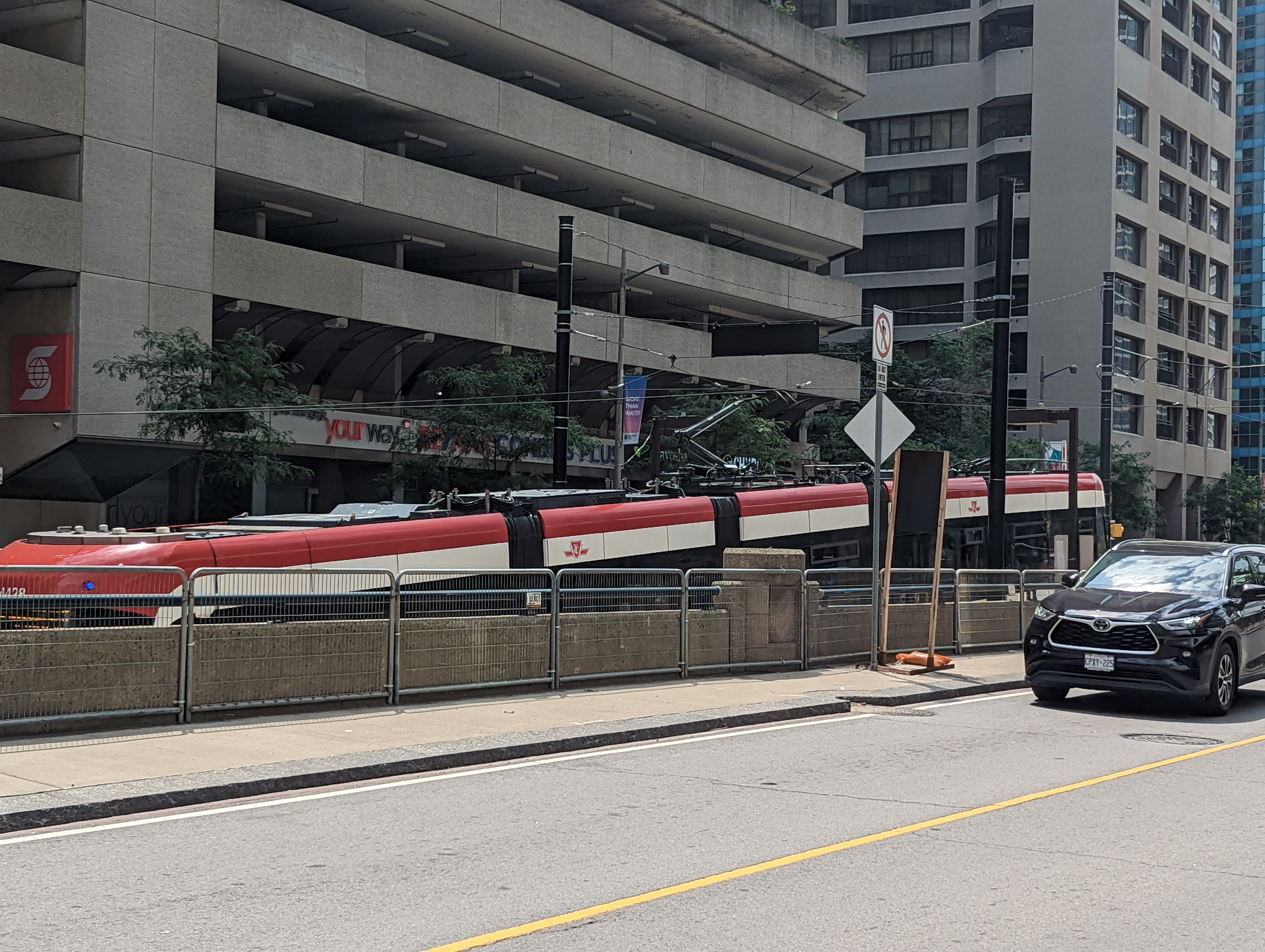
Ramp to Queens Quay, connecting underground and surface sections

510 streetcars operate entirely within dedicated streetcar rights-of-way, along Spadina Avenue, Queens Quay Boulevard and in a tunnel under Bay Street. Most stops along the routes are surface stops, with islands separating the regular traffic from the streetcar tracks, and have streetcar traffic signals, partial shelters, and railings to protect patrons from the traffic. Streetcars serve Union and Spadina subway stations from underground streetcar stations, and an additional underground streetcar station exists at Queens Quay on the approach to Union station. As of November 21, 2021, the 510 Spadina route operates as three branches:

- 510A Spadina: Spadina station to Union station
- 510B Spadina: Spadina station to Queens Quay and Spadina Loop
- 510C Spadina: Spadina station to Spadina Ave and King St.

Route 310 Spadina runs overnight between Spadina and Union stations, replacing the 510 Spadina service. It is part of the TTC's Blue Night Network, operating from approximately 1 am to 5 am.

=== Stop list ===
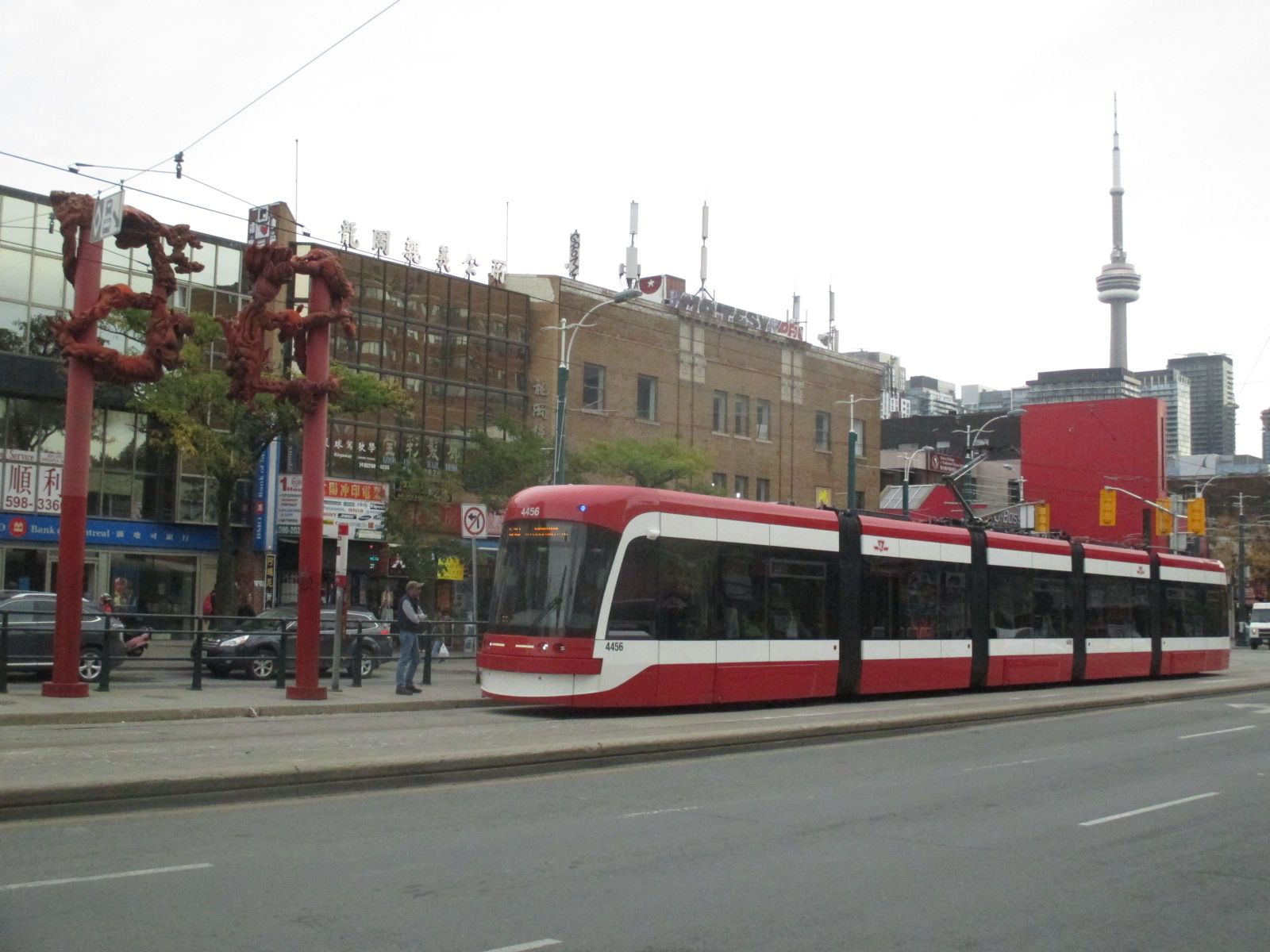
A Flexity Outlook on the 510 Spadina route northbound at Dundas Street

Stop	Type	Connections	Nearby points of interest
Spadina station	Underground station	127	
Sussex Ave	Surface stop		
Harbord St	Surface stop	94	University of Toronto
Willcocks St	Surface stop		
College St	Surface stop	506	
Nassau St	Surface stop		Kensington Market
Dundas St	Surface stop	505	Chinatown
Sullivan St	Surface stop		
Queen St	Surface stop	501	
Richmond St	Surface stop (northbound only)		
King St	Surface stop	504	Fashion District
Front St	Surface stop		
Bremner Blvd	Surface stop		Rogers Centre
Queens Quay Blvd	Surface stop	509	
Rees St	Surface stop	509	CN Tower, Ripley's Aquarium
Harbourfront Centre	Surface stop	509	Harbourfront Centre
Queens Quay	Underground station	509	Jack Layton Ferry Terminal
Union station	Underground station	509	Scotiabank Arena, CIBC Square
