= Leslie Barns =

Streetcar maintenance and storage facility in Toronto

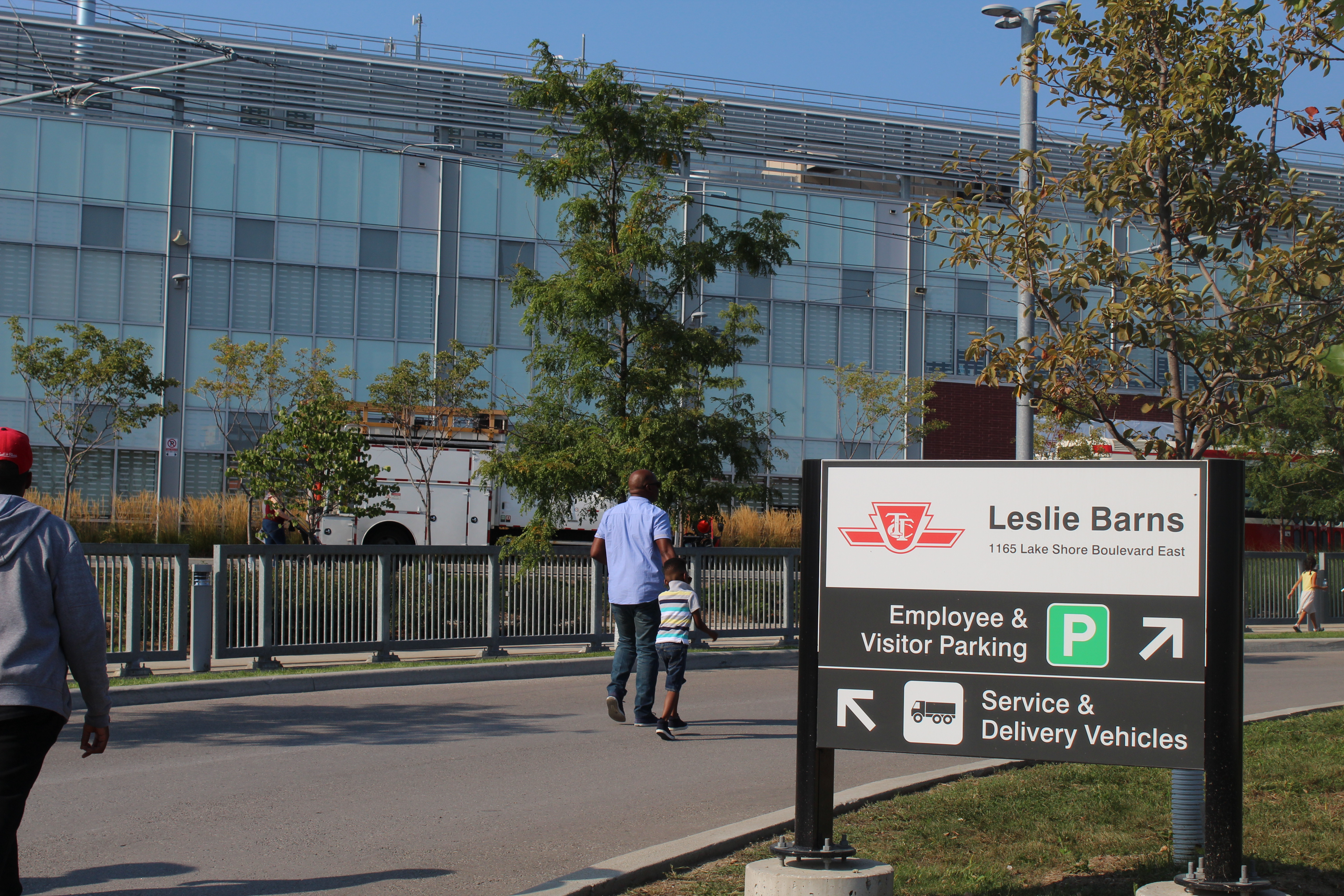

General information
- Location: 1165 Lake Shore Boulevard East; Toronto, Ontario; Canada
- Coordinates: 43°39′31″N 79°19′37″W
- Owner: City of Toronto
- Operator: Toronto Transit Commission

Construction
- Structure type: Flexity Outlook streetcar maintenance and storage facility

Other information
- Status: Active

History
- Opened: November 22, 2015; 10 years ago
Route map
Location

Leslie Barns is a Toronto Transit Commission (TTC) facility at the southeast corner of Leslie Street and Lake Shore Boulevard in Toronto, Ontario, Canada. It was built in 2015 to house and service the majority of the Toronto Transit Commission's fleet of Flexity Outlook light rail vehicles used on its streetcar network. The streetcar storage and maintenance facility at the complex is known as the David R. Miller Carhouse, named for former Toronto mayor David Miller.

== Background ==
While the existing Roncesvalles Carhouse and Russell Carhouse will house some of the vehicles, these older facilities cannot accommodate the entire fleet of Flexity streetcars, which are considerably longer than the Canadian Light Rail Vehicle/Articulated Light Rail Vehicle fleet.

The maintenance facilities at the Harvey Shops within the Hillcrest Complex, as at the two carhouses, are designed for cars with underfloor equipment and maintenance access from pits under the vehicles. The Flexity streetcars have their equipment on the roof, and require a different shop layout for maintenance. Another problem at the Harvey Shops is that most of the service bays can only be accessed by a transfer table that is only 15 metres (49 ft) long while the Flexity cars are 30 metres (98 ft) long. Thus, the Harvey Shops are unsuitable for the new fleet.

The TTC has ordered 204 Flexity streetcars. The plan is to house 60 of them at the west-end Roncesvalles Carhouse, 40 of them at the east-end Russell Carhouse, and the remaining 104 at the Leslie Barns.

The TTC has been considering adding 60 more Flexitys to the current 204-car order to handle growth in demand and possible new streetcar lines along the Waterfront. The Leslie Barns is designed with enough storage so that it plus the two existing carhouses could handle a fleet of 264 vehicles.

== Sites considered ==
The TTC considered six sites for the new facility. They were:

- Site 1: Ashbridges Bay, the site chosen, at the southeast corner of Leslie Street and Lake Shore Boulevard on surplus land at the Ashbridges Bay Wastewater Treatment Plant.
- Site 2: Between Eastern Avenue and Lake Shore Boulevard east of Heward Avenue (currently used as trailer storage)
- Site 3: Unwin Avenue, just east of Regatta Road, TEDCO site and now used by Toronto Parks and Recreation Urban Forestry Tree Nursery and Operations
- Site 4: 495 Commissioners Street, just west of the turning basin, site of the former Cascade paper mill.
- Site 5: 535 Commissioners Street just east of the turning basin, site of the Lafarge concrete plant.
- Site 6: Unwin Avenue, on the western portion of the old Hearn Generating Station property.

Site 1 was the TTC's preferred site. Site 2 was rejected because of its proximity to the Film Studio district and the need for an access track through a residential neighbourhood. Sites 3–6 were rejected because they were further from the existing streetcar system than sites 1 and 2.

Sites considered
- Hillcrest Complex
- Hillcrest Hyro corridor
- Exhibition Loop
- Danforth Garage

After the TTC announced its choice, local councillors asked the TTC to investigate additional sites away from their wards. (A local complaint was that the Ashbridges choice would deny the community future additional parkland, and there were concerns about streetcar traffic on Leslie Street.) Thus, four additional sites were briefly studied:

- Hillcrest Complex: Rejected because only 24 cars could be stored and serviced and because of high staffing costs for a small carhouse.
- Hillcrest Hydro Corridor: Not recommended because of electrical interference, the cost of burying Toronto Hydro's plant, and the added cost of a property lease.
- Exhibition Loop: Rejected because of lack of room for a servicing facility.
- Danforth Garage (former Danforth Carhouse): Rejected as it can hold only 20 cars resulting in high staffing costs for a small carhouse.

In 2020, with respect to a carhouse at the Hillcrest Complex, the TTC somewhat reversed its previous opinion and proposed a carhouse there for 25 vehicles in order to provide more storage space for future fleet expansion and to eliminate the travel time between Roncesvalles Carhouse and the 512 St. Clair line.

== Connecting track ==
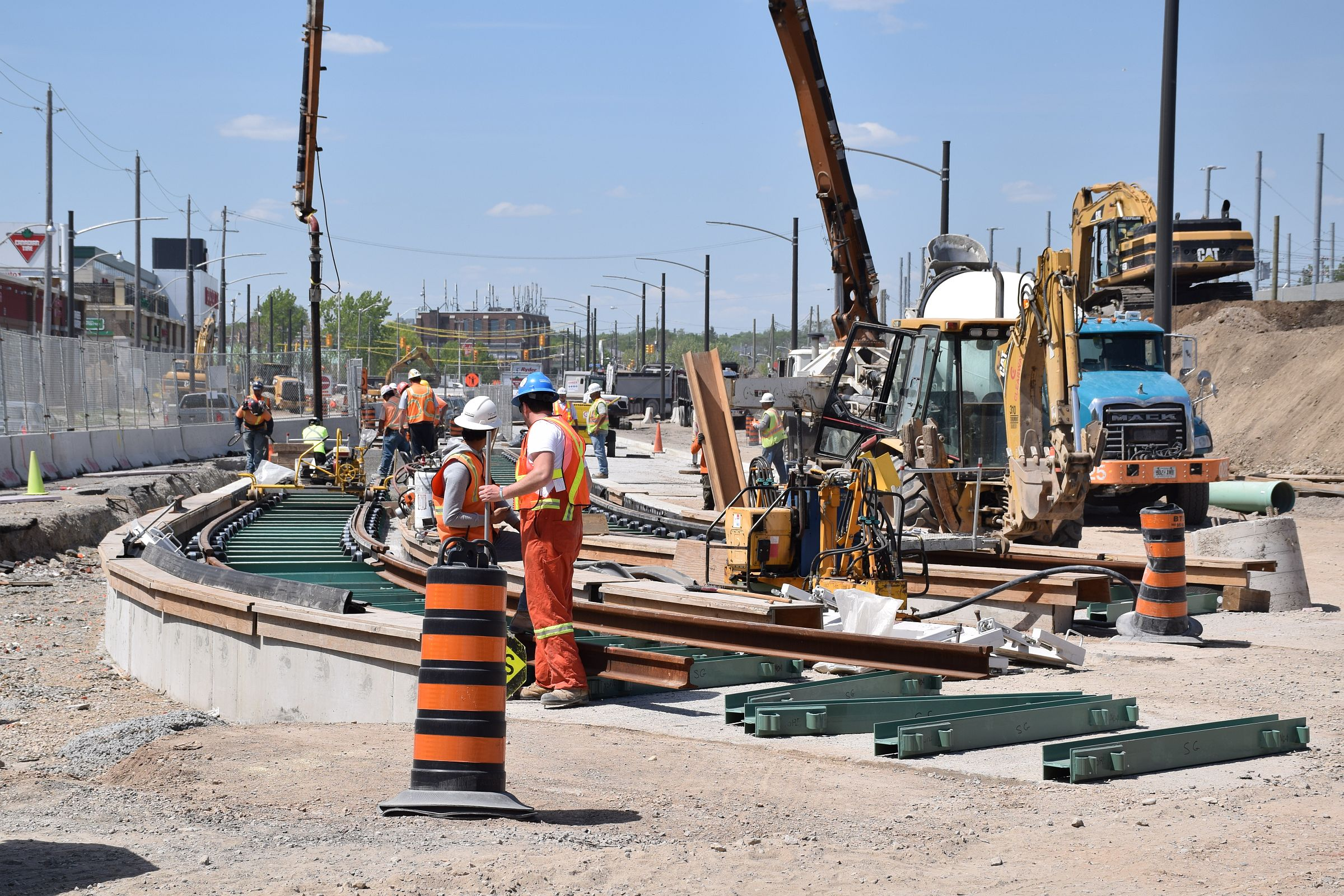
Tracks under construction

The Leslie Barns has a double-track, non-revenue streetcar line connecting the facility to the rest of the streetcar network. The line runs about 800 metres (2,600 ft) along Leslie Street from Queen Street East south to North Service Road where the facility entrance is located.

The track on Leslie Street is specially designed to minimize noise and vibration. The track is laid within a concrete channel or "tub" which has vertical concrete wings along a concrete base. This tub will contain a rubber-like substance that will provide vibration isolation between the track and the roadbed.

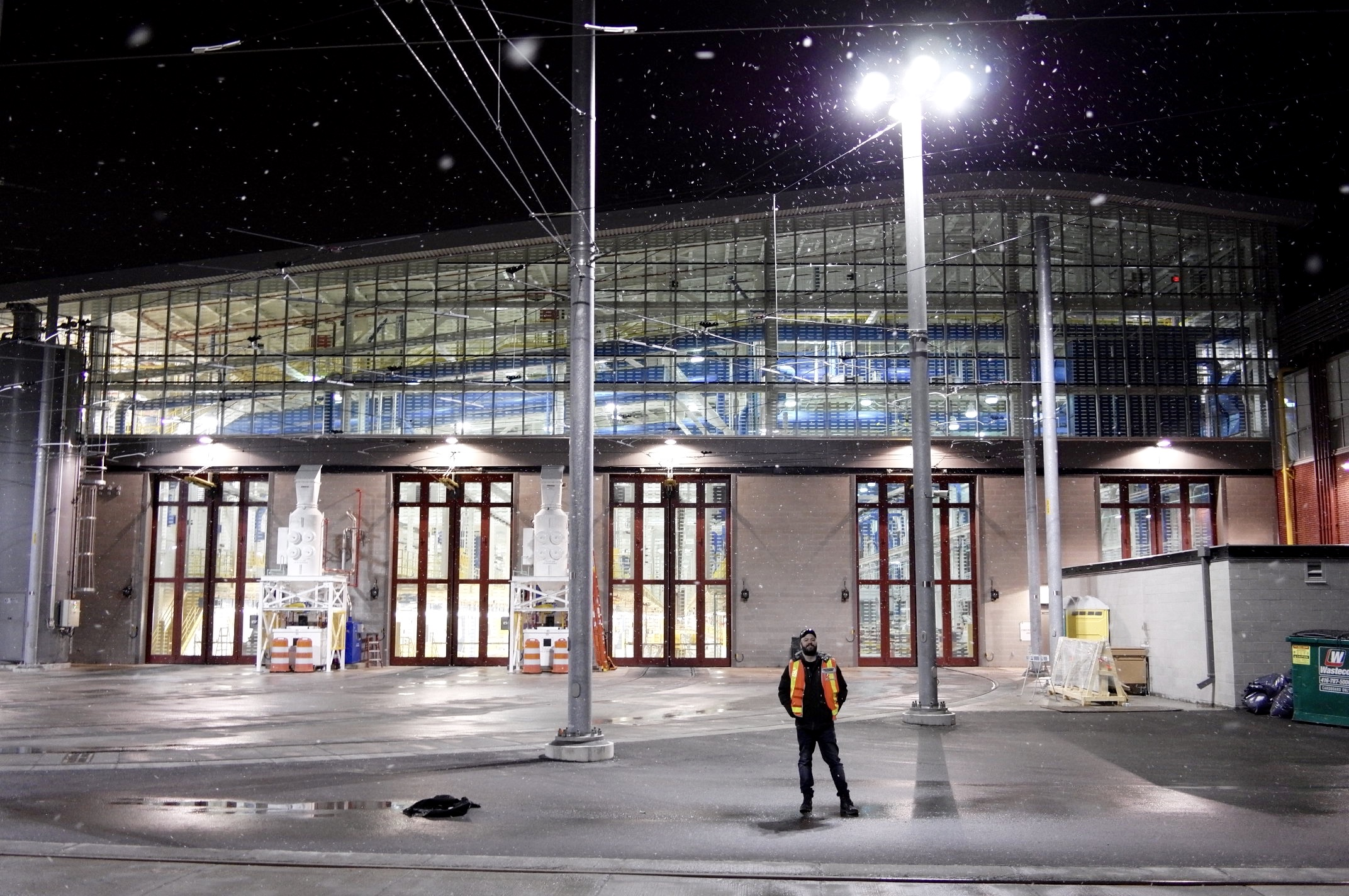
Outside Leslie Barns

Before City Council approved the Leslie Street connection, there were community concerns about introducing streetcar traffic on that street which is residential between Queen Street and Mosley Street. Thus, an alternative was suggested to run the connecting track further east through the Russell Carhouse and via the industrial Knox Street to Lake Shore Boulevard. The TTC rejected this proposal because of lower storage capacity at the Russell Carhouse, extra street and bicycle path crossings, extra time for streetcars to enter and leave service and project delays to switch plans.

As of April 2016, most streetcars enter service via Leslie Street at about 7:25 a.m. and return to the carhouse around 9 p.m.

== Facilities ==
The facility will consist of four buildings: the Carhouse 17,510 square metres (188,500 sq ft), the Traction Power Substation 685 square metres (7,370 sq ft), the Yard Control Huts 16 square metres (170 sq ft), and the Irrigation Hut 25 square metres (270 sq ft), for a combined floor area of 18,236 square metres (196,290 sq ft). The plot of land for the facility occupies 26,000 square metres (6.4 acres). The facility has indoor service bays for 30 Flexity streetcars and can store 100 more in the yard. It can provide fleet repair services for up to 20 vehicles at a time. Outside, there is a 250 metres (820 ft) long braking test track. In all, there are 8.3 km (5.2 mi) of track on the property.

Service bays in the Leslie Barns accommodate a two-tiered maintenance system. The undersides of the low-floor streetcars are accessed via pits. TTC workers access the HVAC and propulsion systems, which are built into the roof of the low-floor Flexity Outlook vehicles, via overhead catwalks. The carhouse is wired with the overhead catenary system that supplies power to the vehicles. The exception is the paint booth, into which the streetcars are "muled" or pushed.

Leslie Barns has an electronic streetcar-dispatch system to show the position of streetcars in the yard. With the electronic system, operators coming on shift can monitor the location of their assigned streetcar from the lounge. A maintenance worker or "yard jockey" delivers the vehicle to the operator on the west side of the barn.

About 200 TTC maintenance and operations workers will work at the Leslie Barns once all the new streetcars are delivered. The facility will also be the site for all streetcar operator and maintenance training.

The carhouse building has a north-sloping green roof, and a stormwater management pond at the east end of the yard to irrigate the rooftop plantings, a mix of alliums and sedums. Three hundred native trees will also be planted on the property. The carhouse building has specially glazed windows striped to deter birds from flying into the building.

A noise reduction wall was erected around the perimeter of the Leslie Barns to meet Ontario Ministry of the Environment noise limit requirements. The wall will include decorative features such as a red panel design and greenery.

The facility also has a Flexity simulator consisting of the interior of the operator cab for training operators.

== Parkland ==
Outside the facility walls, along Leslie Street and Lakeshore Boulevard, there is a linear park incorporating the Martin Goodman Trail, wide multi-use paths, grass, plants and benches. Grading will also reduce the perimeter wall's perceived height. Peek-a-boo panels will permit passersby to watch activity inside the yard. Vines will be trained up mesh panels on the wall.

== History ==
In June 2009, the Ashbridges Bay Streetcar Maintenance & Storage Facility (now the Leslie Barns) was projected to cost CA$345 million, but this did not include provision for soil removal and site remediation, nor for the connection track to Queen Street. Site remediation was complicated by the site's prior history as landfill of Lake Ontario.

On November 11, 2009, Toronto City Council chose the site for the Ashbridges Bay Streetcar Maintenance & Storage Facility at the southeast corner of Leslie Street and Lake Shore Boulevard.

In November 2012, the TTC decided to change the name of the carhouse from the "Ashbridges Bay Streetcar Maintenance & Storage Facility" to the more colloquial "Leslie Barns" at the request of the local community and councillors.

By June 2013, the capital cost of the facility was budgeted at $497 million.

By June 2013, the TTC had a contingency plan to store up to 22 older CLRV streetcars at Exhibition Loop in 2014 to make space for Flexity streetcars arriving before the availability of Leslie Barns.

In September 2013, construction began on the spur along Leslie Street from the facility to Queen Street East. The construction was projected to require 12 weeks of road closures.

On January 28, 2015, Natalie Alcoba wrote in the National Post that the facility was expected to be almost empty when it opened later in 2015 because Bombardier had fallen far behind delivery of the new vehicles. As of October 2015 only ten new Flexity vehicles were in operation, when the delivery schedule said 43 vehicles should have been delivered.

In May 2015, 60 metres (200 ft) of track was laid 9 centimetres (3.5 in) too high by the contractor and had to be rebuilt, resulting in delays to the track project time line to mid-July 2015.

With the opening of the Leslie Barns on November 22, 2015, the temporary storage of cars at Exhibition Loop ended. Although the Flexity streetcars started operating out of the facility on November 22, 2015, the barns were still under construction and would not be fully occupied by the TTC until early 2016.

On May 28, 2016, the TTC officially opened the Leslie Barns in a ceremony starting off a Doors Open event with the public visiting the facility. However, the Leslie Barns had been in at least partial operation since November 22, 2015.
