= Flexity Outlook (Toronto) =

Toronto streetcar model operated by the TTC

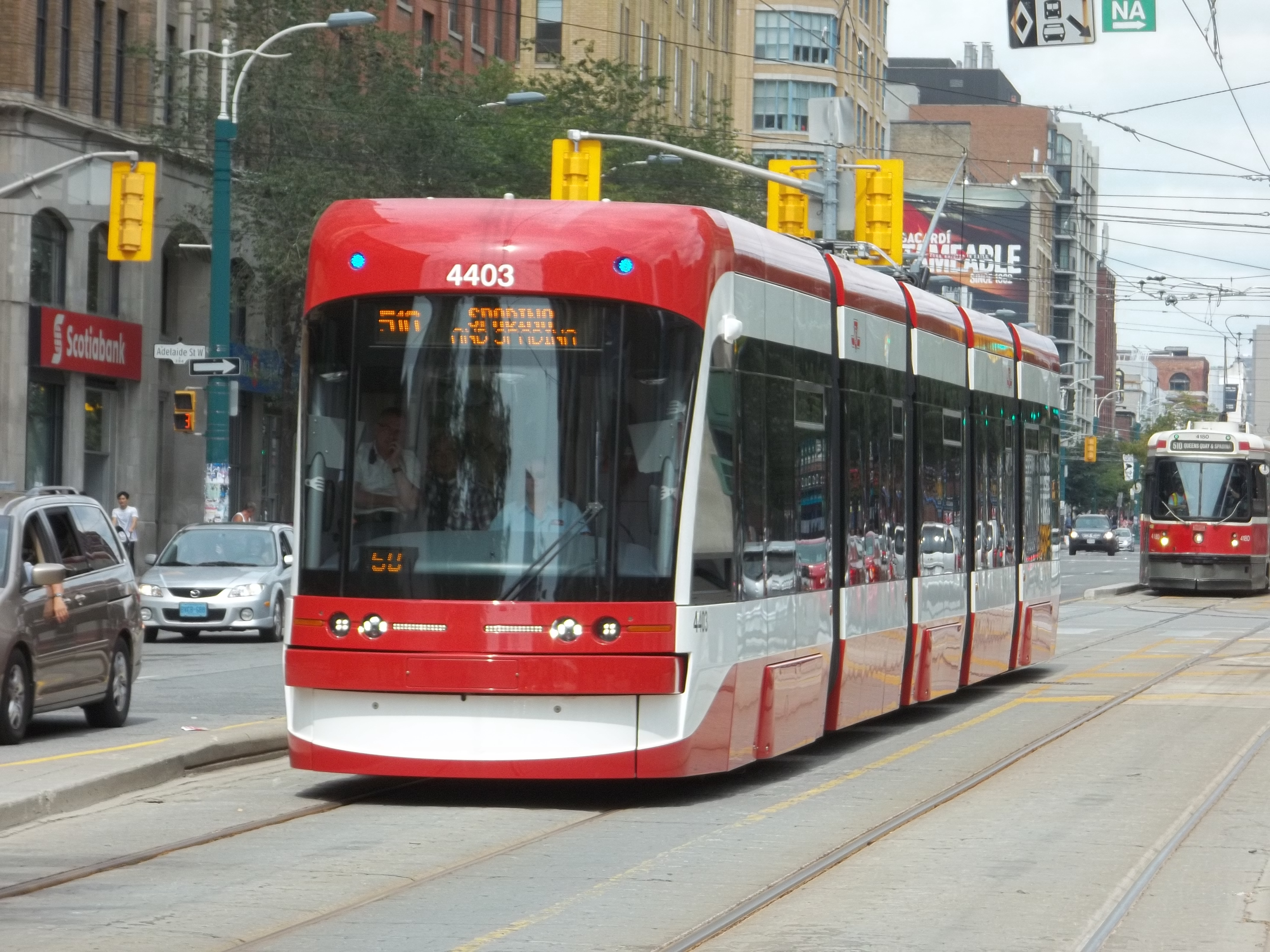
- Flexity Outlook on route 510 Spadina

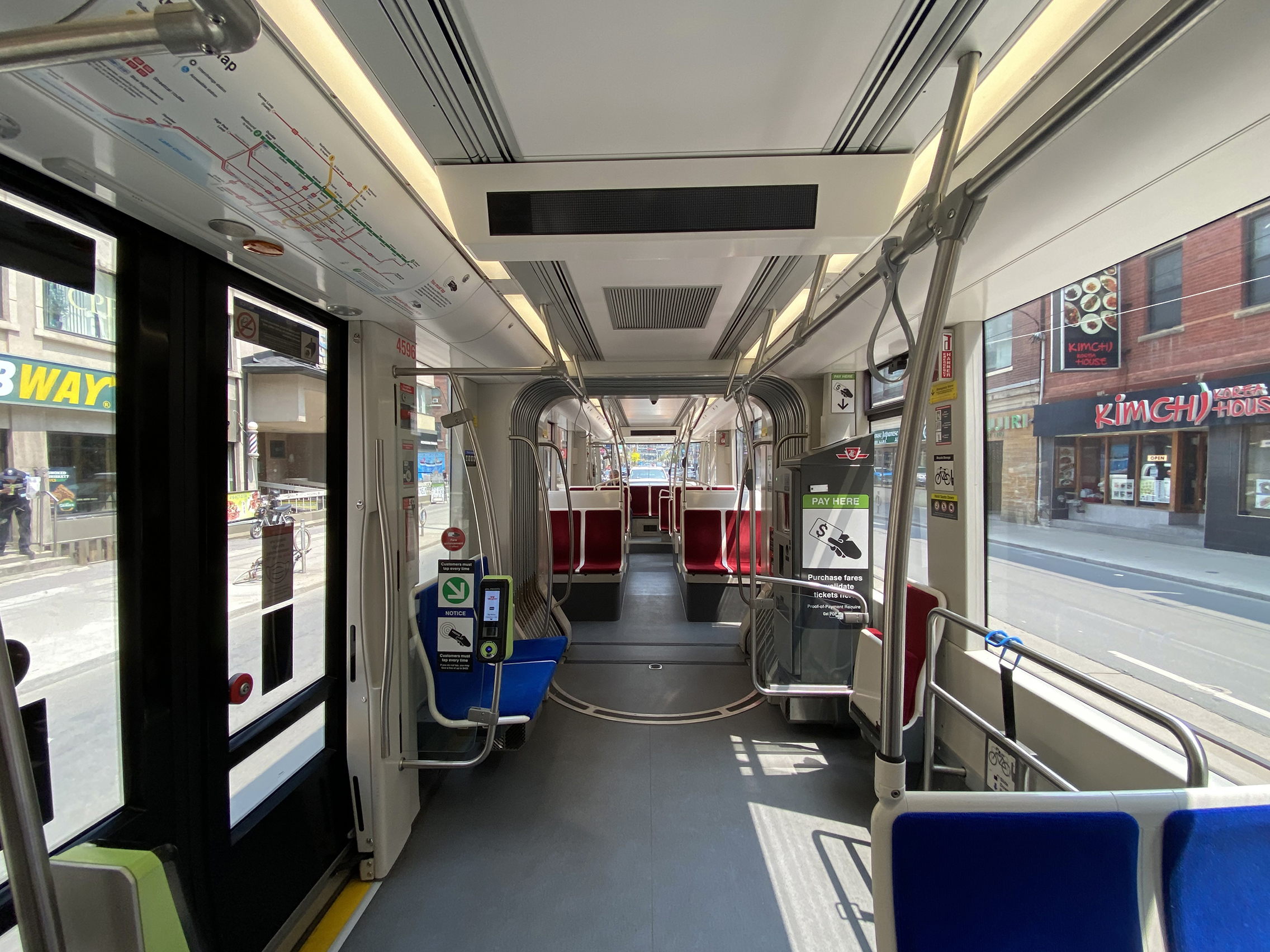
- Interior of the Flexity Outlook
- In service: 2014–present
- Manufacturer: Bombardier Transportation
- Built at: Thunder Bay (4400–4571, 4580–4663) / Kingston, Ontario, Canada (4572–4579); Ciudad Sahagún, Hidalgo, Mexico (chassis)
- Family name: Bombardier Flexity
- Replaced: Canadian Light Rail Vehicle; Articulated Light Rail Vehicle
- Constructed: 2009–present
- Entered service: August 31, 2014; 12 years ago
- Number in service: 264
- Formation: 5 articulated sections
- Fleet numbers: 4400–4663
- Capacity: 70 (seated), 130 maximum
- Operator: Toronto Transit Commission
- Depots: Leslie Barns, Roncesvalles Carhouse, Russell Carhouse
- Line served: Toronto streetcar system

Specifications
- Car body construction: Stainless steel
- Car length: 28 m (91 ft 10 in)
- Width: 2.54 m (8 ft 4 in)
- Height: 3.84 m (12 ft 7 in)
- Doors: 4 (right side only)
- Articulated sections: 5
- Maximum speed: 70 km/h (43 mph)
- Weight: 48,200 kg (106,300 lb)
- Electric systems: Overhead line, 600 V DC
- Current collection: Trolley pole or pantograph
- UIC classification: Bo′+Bo′+Bo′
- Minimum turning radius: 10.97 metres (36 ft)
- Track gauge: 1,495 mm (4 ft 10 7/8 in) Toronto gauge

The Flexity Outlook is the latest model of streetcar in the rolling stock of the Toronto streetcar system owned by the Toronto Transit Commission (TTC). Based on the Bombardier Flexity, they were first ordered in 2009 and were built by Bombardier Transportation in Thunder Bay and Kingston, Ontario, with specific modifications for Toronto, such as unidirectional operation and the ability to operate on the unique broad Toronto gauge (1,495 mm / 4 ft 10 7/8 in).

Excluding the TTC's heritage collection of a few older streetcars, the entire active streetcar fleet consists of Flexity Outlook vehicles. They replaced the Canadian Light Rail Vehicle (CLRV) and its articulated counterpart, the Articulated Light Rail Vehicle (ALRV), which were all retired in December 2019.

The Flexity Outlook is the first modern low-floor and accessible streetcar used in the city, improving access for people with disabilities, the elderly and people travelling with small children. With a length of over 28 metres (92 ft), they are the largest single-unit streetcars ever used by the TTC. They have four sliding doors, air conditioning, seating for up to 70 passengers, and an interior bicycle rack. The vehicles are equipped with two on-board fare vending machines (FVM) along with Presto card readers. The introduction of the vehicle led to the use of a proof-of-payment (POP) system with all-door boarding and alighting.

Line 5 Eglinton uses a similar Flexity Freedom light rail vehicle, which—like the Flexity Outlook—is also a low-floor accessible vehicle. The two models are not compatible for several reasons, including track gauge.

== Features ==
The vehicle is based on Bombardier's standardized Flexity Outlook product, which is also used in cities like Brussels, Marseille, and Geneva, but tailored to Toronto's needs. Specific design requirements included use of TTC's unique broad track gauge rather than standard gauge, the ability to handle a tight turning radius of 11 metres (36 ft), single-point switches, the ability to climb the city's steep hills and valleys, clearance, and ability to upgrade from trolley poles to a more modern pantograph current collection system. At 28 metres (92 ft) in length, the Flexity Outlook is almost twice as long as the TTC's older streetcars, with five articulated sections. Unlike previous streetcars used in Toronto, the vehicle is low-floor and accessible with major mechanical and electrical components mounted on the roof.

=== Accessibility ===
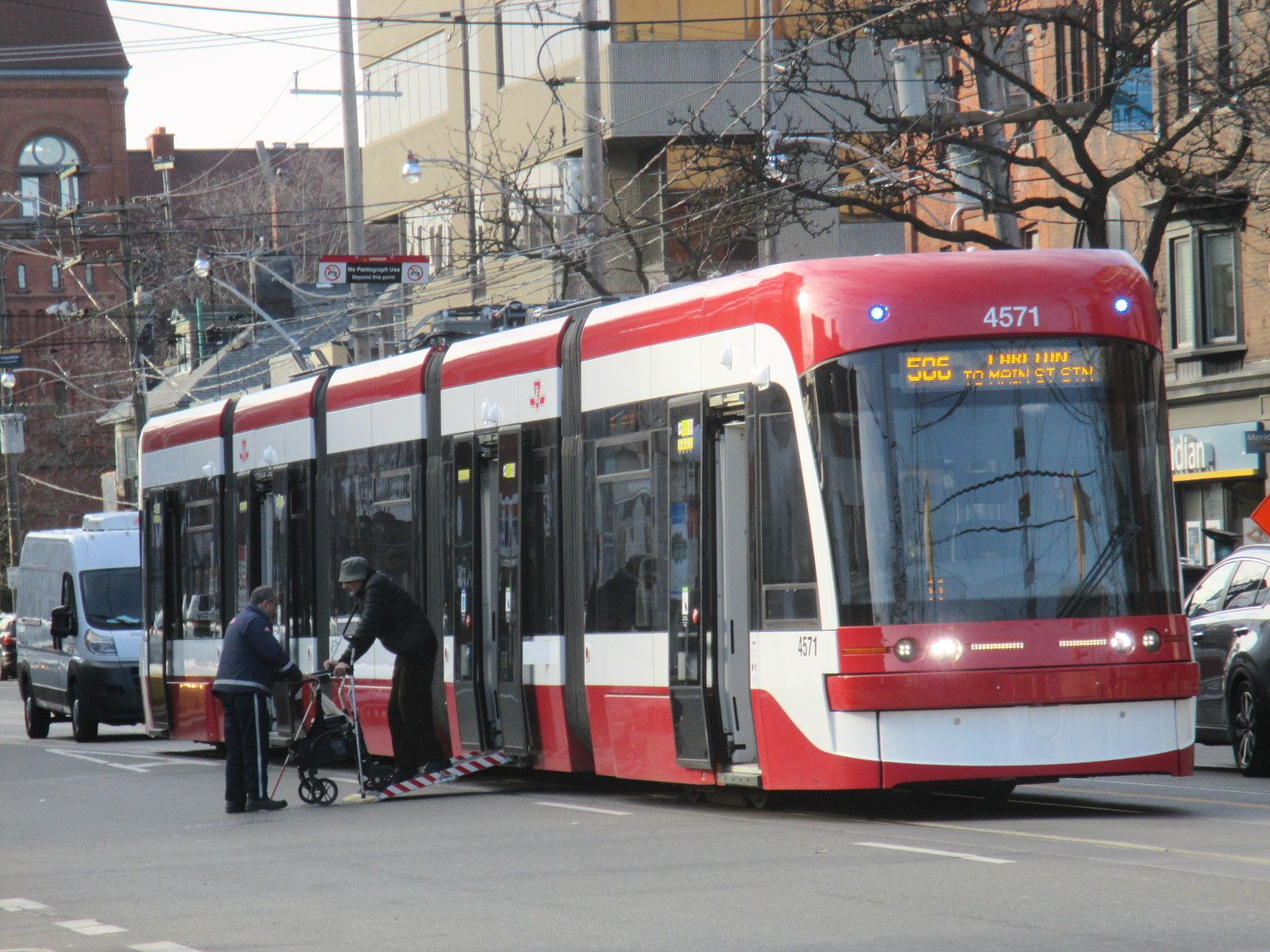
Operator helping passenger down the ramp deployed in the street

The Flexity Outlook streetcars are the TTC's first low-floor streetcars, and they are accessible for passengers using wheelchairs or mobility devices. Only one step is needed to board at any door, making accessing the streetcar easier for older people, pregnant women, people travelling with small children, or those travelling with heavy luggage.

An extendable loading ramp for riders using wheelchairs, strollers or other mobility devices is located at the second set of doors of the vehicle. A passenger can signal the operator to deploy the ramp by pressing the blue accessibility button by the inside or outside of this door. The ramp has two modes: if the streetcar stop is alongside a curb or raised platform, only a short portion is extended (the operator can open the ramp either from inside the driver booth or from the outside of the vehicle); if only street level is available, the operator will exit the vehicle and a further length of the ramp would extend to allow access at that level. According to Greg Ernst, the TTC's chief streetcar engineer, each Flexity streetcar deploys its ramp four times a day on average.

Inside the vehicle, there is one wheelchair-accessible area at the second door, with the capacity for two mobility aids, as well as three priority seating areas for people with disabilities, older adults, and pregnant women, located at the first, second and third door.

=== Fare collection ===
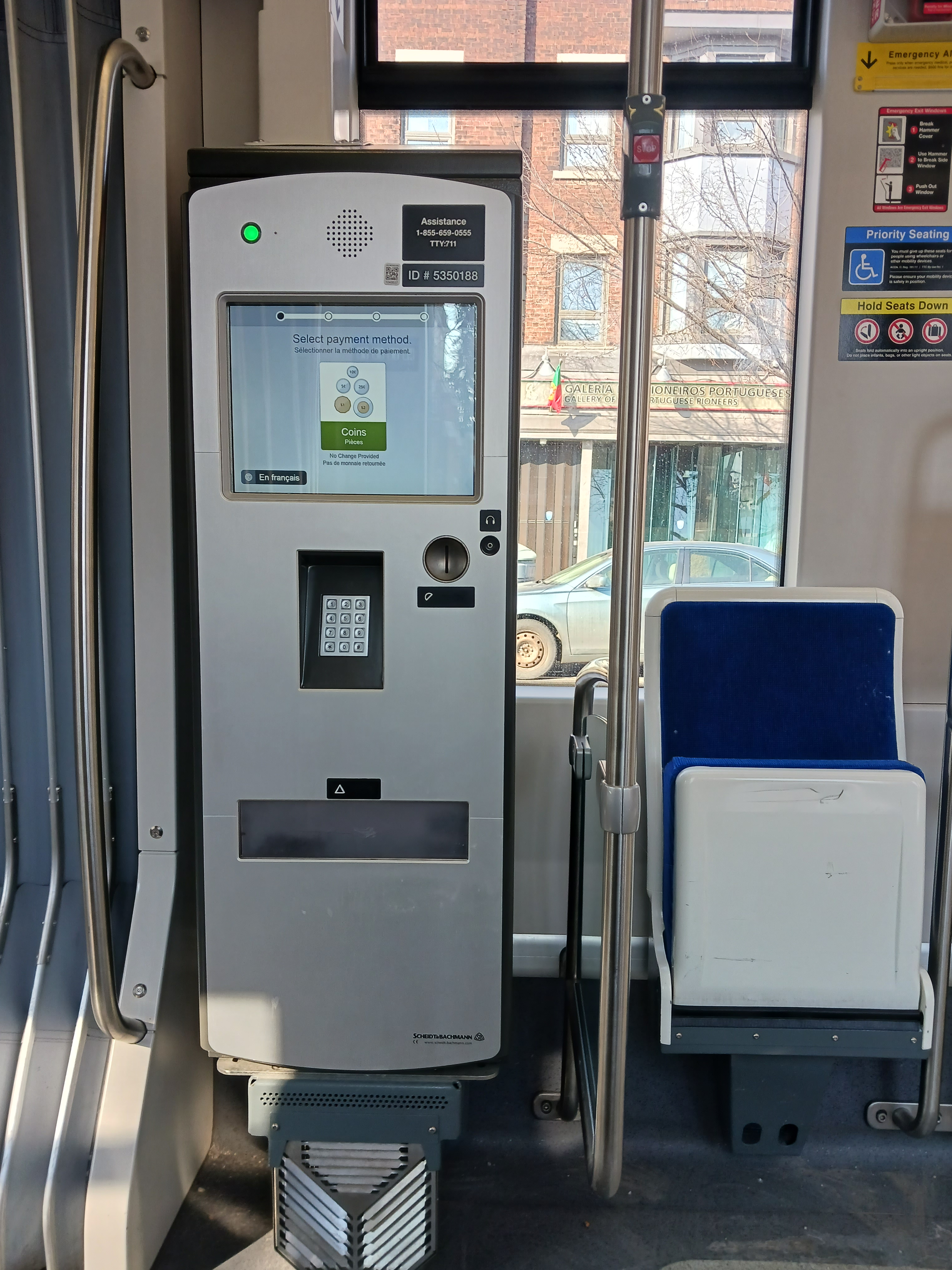
Onboard fare vending machine; customers paying their fares using coins can use this machine to obtain a single-ride paper ticket.

In the Flexity Outlook streetcars, a proof-of-payment (POP) system is used at all times. This is because the operator is not responsible for fare collection since the operator sits inside a closed cab. Under the POP system, passengers are required to carry proof that they have paid their fares, such as a paper transfer receipt or a tapped-in Presto card or contactless credit and debit card.

The Flexity streetcars have six Presto fare readers on them (with one reader at front and rear single doors and two readers at the middle double doors), where customers can tap their Presto card or contactless credit and debit card upon boarding to pay their fares or validate transfers. The ability to pay with a contactless credit or debit card was introduced in August 2023 as part of a system-wide TTC rollout.

Passengers paying with exact cash in coins can use one of the two onboard fare vending machines (FVM) located at the middle double doors and obtain a single-ride paper ticket, which acts as POP and to use as a transfer on other connecting TTC routes. From December 2015 until December 2018, FVMs also accepted single-fare payments by contactless credit and debit cards. At the time, the Flexity streetcars were the only surface vehicles in the TTC network where this form of payment was accepted; however, this feature was removed because it caused FVMs to malfunction.

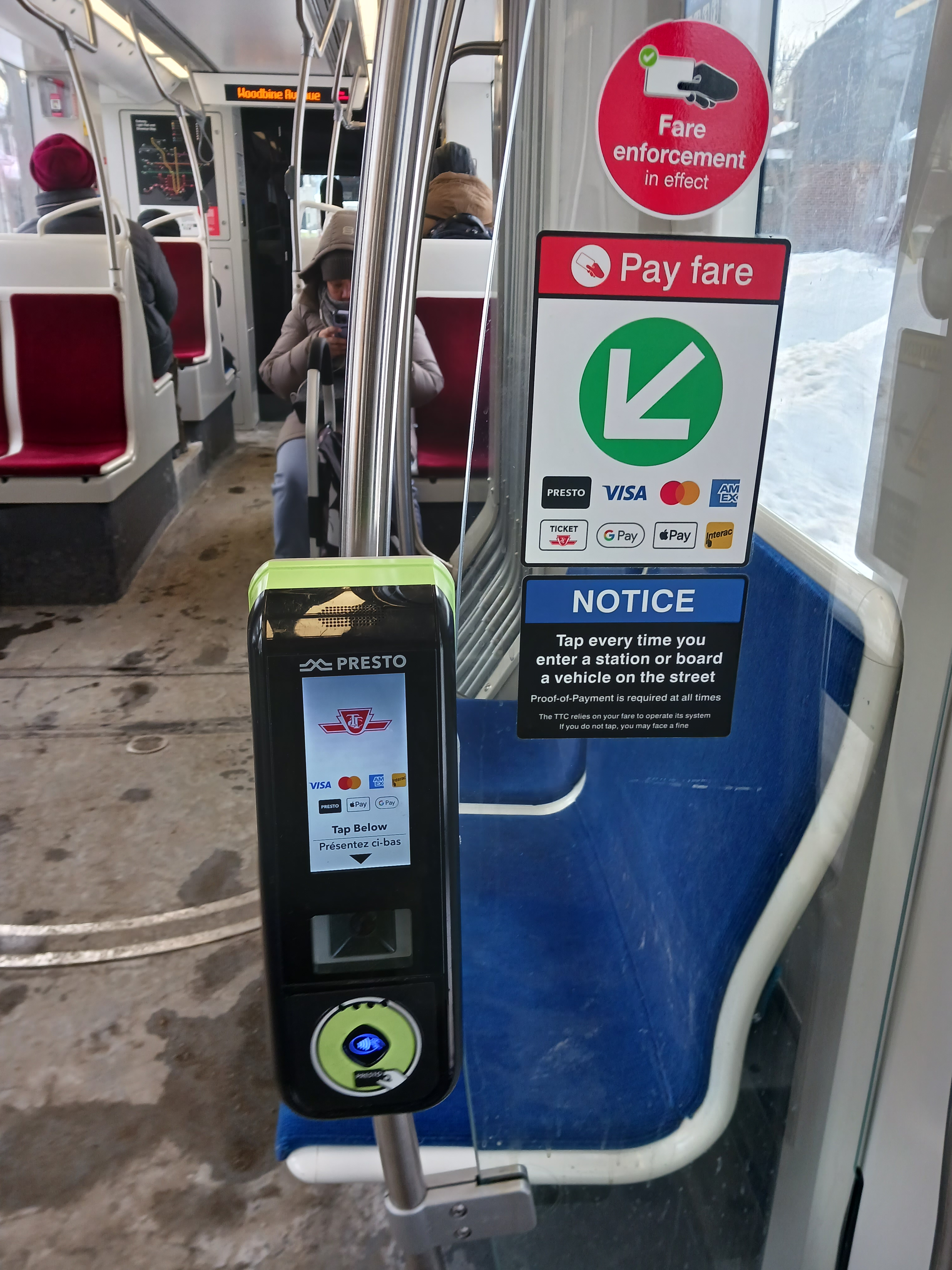
A Presto media reader. Readers are located at all Flexity Outlook streetcar doors for customers using Presto, credit or debit card to pay fares or validate transfers.

=== Audible warning signals ===
The Flexity streetcars have both a gong and a horn. Instead of the mechanical gongs used on older vehicles, the Flexity Outlook vehicles use an amplified digital recording of a gong. They are also the first vehicles to have built-in electronic horns fleet-wide upon delivery, while most of the CLRV and ALRV streetcars had their horns installed in the late 1990s. Despite the Flexity Outlook vehicles being heavy-duty streetcars, their horns are similar to those used on TTC buses or regular automobiles. The gong and the horn can be heard from both ends of the vehicle.

=== Destination sign ===
The Flexity Outlook streetcars are the TTC's first streetcars to be outfitted with amber digital LED destination and run number signs rather than manually operated roller blinds used on older vehicles. The destination signs are posted at the front, rear, and sides of the vehicle, which identify the route number, name, and destination. Older vehicles only displayed the route number and destination for brevity. The Flexity streetcars also display two blue bullseye lights on the front to indicate that they are accessible vehicles.

=== Automated voice announcement system ===
As with all TTC vehicles, the Flexity Outlook streetcars have on-board automated audible and visual next stop announcements, which are broadcast over the vehicle's interior public address (PA) system and on overhead signs. They were also the first vehicles – when they were introduced in 2014 – to be outfitted with external PA systems that announce the vehicle's route and destination, and – unlike other TTC vehicles – it can be used for live operator-based public service announcements.

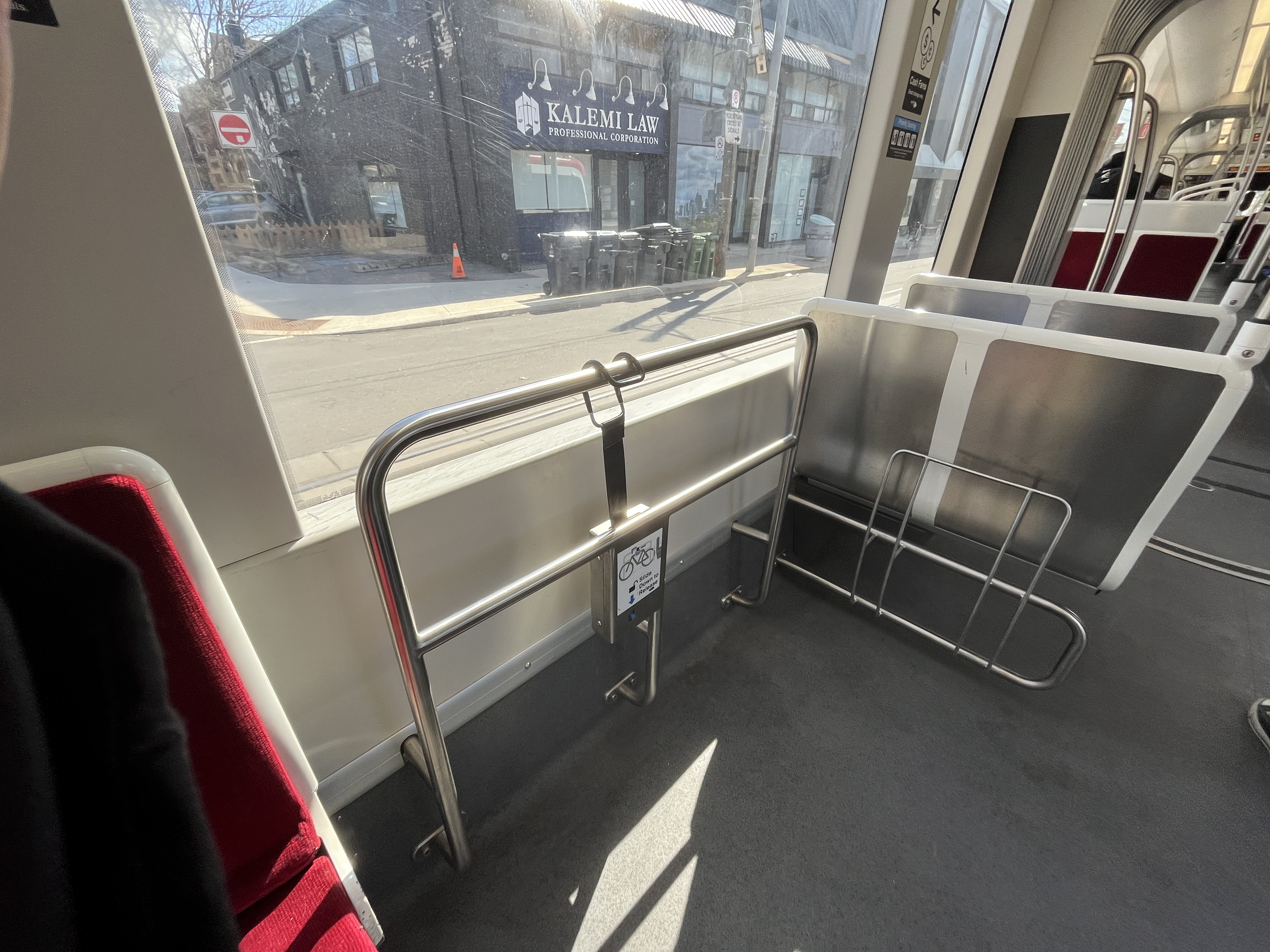
Bicycle rack installed on a Flexity Outlook streetcar

=== Bicycle rack ===
The Flexity Outlook streetcars have a bicycle rack, which is located inside the vehicle, by the third set of doors from the front and can store two standard-sized bicycles arranged parallel to the streetcar itself. The rack also has a retractable pull-out strap to help hold one of the bicycles in place.

=== Wheel squeal ===
The Flexity Outlook streetcars are equipped with an on-board wheel lubrication system to reduce squeal when the streetcars go around sharp curves. The TTC is also developing a wheel-mounted noise damping ring to further reduce high-pitch squeal, and hopes to begin prototype testing in the fourth quarter of 2017. The TTC is working to install improved lubrication system units at streetcar loops that are activated by the passage of a Flexity Outlook vehicle. These provide partial solutions to the problem. Other factors affecting wheel squeal on Flexity Outlook streetcars are:

- The sharper the radius, the greater the chance of squealing.
- Weather conditions such as rain, snow, humidity and temperature fluctuation can affect streetcar noise levels.
- Rainfall and other forms of precipitation washes lubricant away.

== Selection process ==
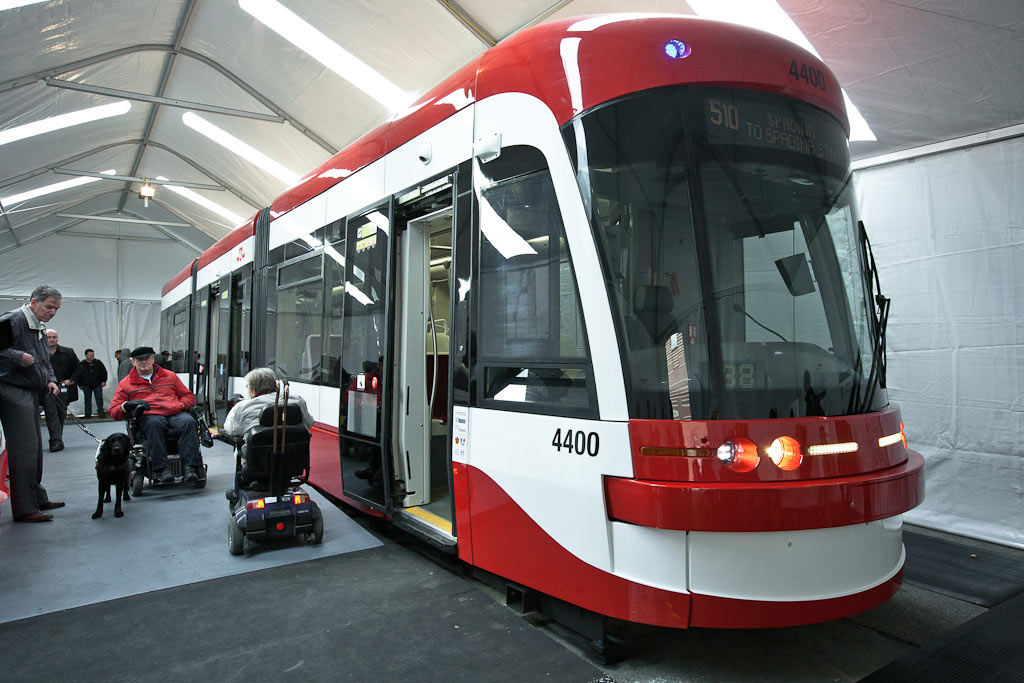
A mockup of the first three sections of the Flexity Outlook vehicle on public display at the Hillcrest Complex in 2011

With the TTC's former streetcar fleet nearing the end of its service life, the Commission began looking for a manufacturer to build new streetcars. In June 2007, the TTC launched a public consultation on the design of its new streetcars, including an online survey, and displays at Finch and Scarborough Centre stations, the Albion Centre, and Yonge–Dundas Square (now Sankofa Square). Mockups of the Flexity Swift (as used in Minneapolis) and Siemens Combino Plus (predecessor to the Siemens Avenio) were on display at the 2007 Canadian National Exhibition in front of the Enercare Centre, then known as the Direct Energy Centre.

On September 19, 2007, the TTC published their specifications for the "LF LRV", as they called the proposed new streetcars. The specifications required that the vehicle would be compatible with the TTC's existing tracks, with tight turning radii of 11 metres (36 ft), good hill-climbing ability given the city's topography with steep ravines, and compatibility with single-leaf switches. The tender requested a streetcar of 27 to 30 metres (89 to 98 ft), with multiple points of articulation, and three powered bogies.

Though the document stated that the TTC would accept a well-designed 70 percent low-floor streetcar, it decided to seek a 100-percent low-floor design, with folding ramps that could be fitted at the doors to allow stepless boarding where platforms were not available. The fleet replacing the CLRVs and ALRVs was to remain single-ended with doors on the right only, and to retain current collection by trolley pole, but the TTC also requested that provision be made for future conversion to pantograph, and that the option of buying a bi-directional version of the streetcar for new lines be available. Provision was to be made for ticket-vending machines on board, rather than have the driver take fares.

=== Bidding process ===
Bombardier, Siemens, AnsaldoBreda, Mytram, Vossloh Kiepe, and Kinki Sharyo all expressed interest in competing to supply the new streetcars, but most dropped out of the bidding at various stages. While the TTC expressed interest in the vehicles built by Škoda for the Portland Streetcar, that company did not submit a bid. Siemens gained a great deal of attention for its Combino Plus in 2007, with newspaper advertisements and a website, but eventually decided that "it was in [their] better interest not to bid". Only Bombardier and a small British firm, Tram Power, submitted bids.

Bombardier had displayed a mock-up of the Flexity Swift built for the Minneapolis project but later offered a variant of the Flexity Outlook to meet the 100-percent low-floor requirement, promoting it with a website called "The Streetcar Redefined". Tram Power's product was the Citytram, a prototype of which was being tested on the Blackpool Tramway until it caught fire on January 24, 2007.

On July 18, 2008, the TTC announced that both bids had been rejected – according to TTC chair Adam Giambrone, Bombardier's entry "would have derailed on Toronto streets", while TRAM Power's was not "commercially compliant" – and reopened the contract. Bombardier actively disputed this claim, adding that it could either supply a compliant vehicle or pay for CA$10.4 million of construction to make the TTC's track network compliant. The TTC entered into direct negotiations with three companies (Alstom, Siemens, and Bombardier) following its August 27, 2008, commission meeting.

On April 24, 2009, the TTC announced that it had chosen a customized version of the Flexity Outlook to replace the CLRV and ALRV fleet.

=== Contract award ===
On June 26, 2009, the Toronto City Council approved funding for 204 new vehicles and signed the contract with Bombardier. The City of Toronto committed one-third of the necessary funds, and requested funding from the provincial and federal governments for the streetcars. While the provincial government agreed to fund one-third of the project, the federal government was unwilling to provide any money before the June 27, 2009, deadline approached to finalize the contract with Bombardier. Finally, Toronto City Council voted on June 26, 2009, to commit the other one-third of the funding by deferring other capital projects, such that the funding formula became two-thirds municipal and one-third provincial funding. The official contributions were announced by TTC Chair Karen Stintz at the unveiling on November 15, 2012. The Province of Ontario contributed $416.3 million, the federal government indirectly contributed $108 million through its gas tax fund, and the City of Toronto and TTC contributed $662 million, for a total cost of $1.2 billion.

A partial mockup of the new streetcar was put on display at the Hillcrest Complex for tours in November 2011.

== Delivery ==
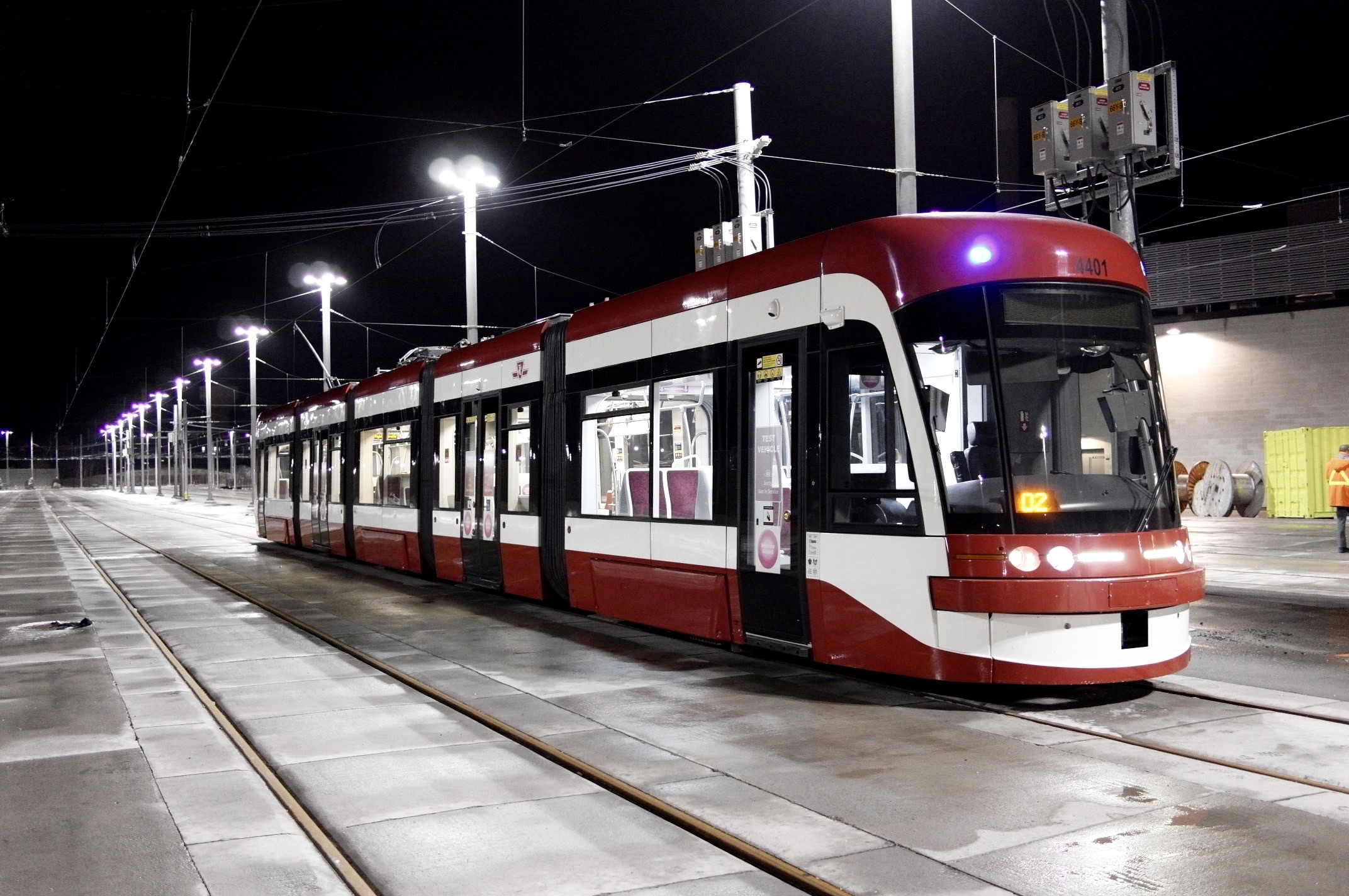
Flexity Outlook streetcar at night in 2016

=== Prototypes ===
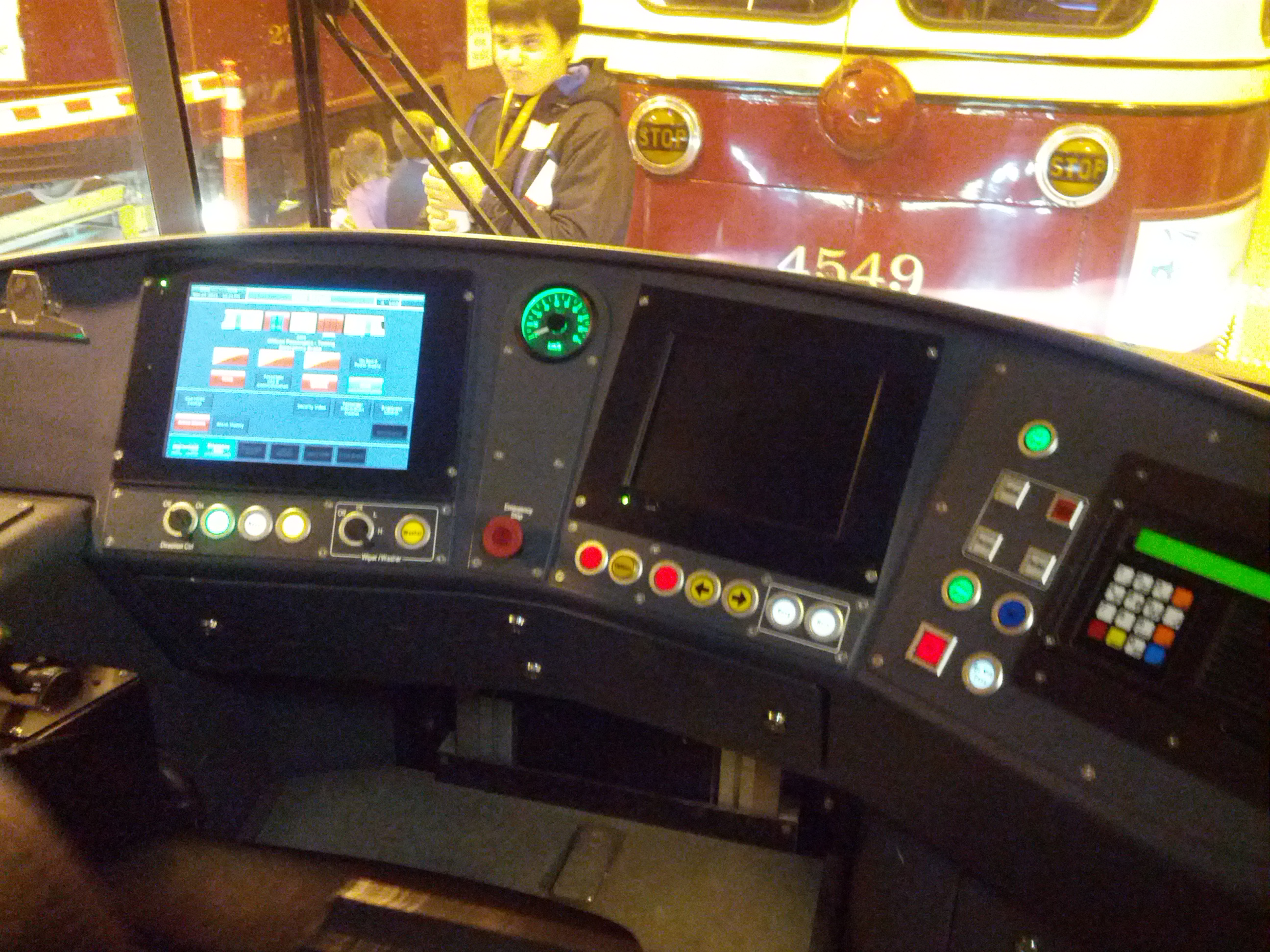
Flexity Outlook dashboard

The first vehicle arrived in Toronto on September 25, 2012, by rail from the Thunder Bay plant to Canadian Pacific Railway's Lambton Yard near Runnymede Road and St. Clair Avenue West.

It was loaded on a flatbed trailer and arrived at Harvey Shop at the Hillcrest Complex a few days later. Streetcar 4400 was the first of three test vehicles delivered for testing and technology verification. The carset has the same number as the wooden mockup streetcar. The new vehicle was unveiled to the public at the TTC's Hillcrest complex during a media conference on November 15, 2012.

The TTC added a railway siding with an unloading ramp at the Hillcrest Complex for the unloading of Flexity Outlook streetcars shipped by Bombardier. (The ramp was not finished in time for the arrival of 4400.) A CLRV streetcar was used as a tractor to pull a new Flexity Outlook off of the railway flatcar and down the ramp.

Prototype vehicles 4401 and 4402 underwent almost a year of extensive testing in Toronto. That testing triggered a change to the design of the loading ramps, over which a wheelchair used to tilt. The vehicles would only become TTC property when their ramps are retrofitted to the new design.

According to CEO Andy Byford in 2015, the first Flexity streetcars were so poorly manufactured that the TTC would not accept them for fear they would break down on bumpy city streets. At the Thunder Bay plant, when workers went to attach the under-frame to the sidewalls, they found they were not square. To solve the problem, they wanted to rivet the two pieces together. The TTC rejected that solution, as according to Byford, rivets pop. There were still issues with loose screws, wiring and electrical connectors as of May 2015. To address these problems, Bombardier retooled its Mexican operation in Ciudad Sahagún, Hidalgo (a former Concarril facility) and implemented new quality-assurance processes at Thunder Bay.

=== Introduction into service ===
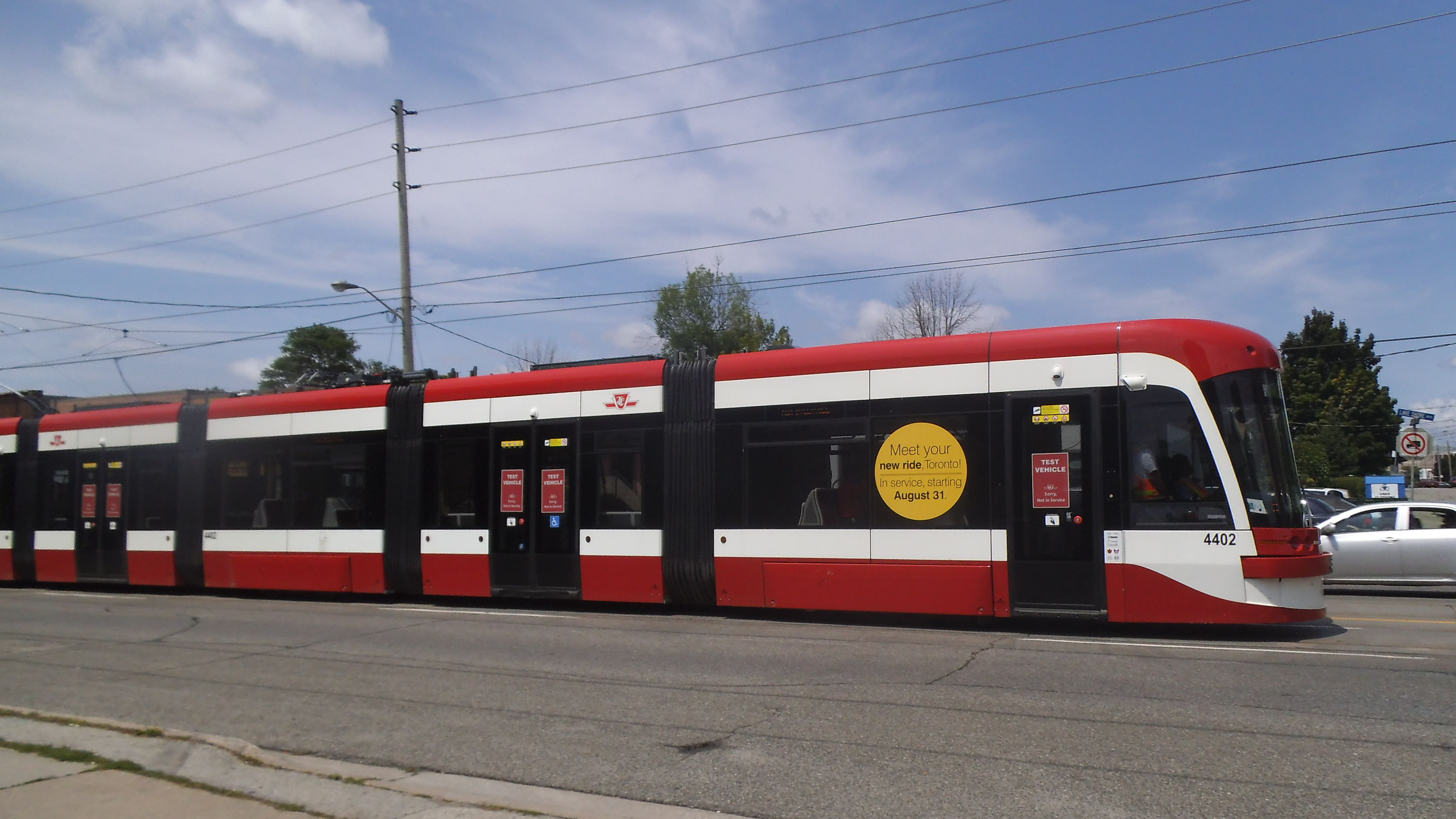
Flexity Outlook being tested in 2014

Beginning in 2013, the Flexity Outlook streetcars were tested on several routes, in a variety of weather conditions.

In July 2014, a labour strike started at the Bombardier Thunder Bay plant. TTC spokesman Brad Ross said that despite the strike, the new vehicles would enter service on time even if there was only one new vehicle ready for fare service. Bombardier workers voted to accept a new contract on September 12, 2014. The Bombardier plan had been to roll out a new vehicle every three weeks, but the company stated that measures would be taken to roll out three new vehicles per month until production was back on schedule. From 2014, Bombardier had supply chain problems resulting in situations of having too many of some components and shortages of others; the shortages resulted in production delays. Each vehicle consisted of roughly 10,000 components.

Flexity Outlook streetcars 4400 and 4403 entered service on August 31, 2014, on the 510 Spadina streetcar line. Streetcar 4403 was delivered on May 31, 2014. The TTC had hoped to start with six Flexity Outlook vehicles in service but had to settle for just two because of production problems including the Bombardier labour strike. In September 2014, a month after the rollout of fare service on the Spadina line, riders of other routes expressed jealousy and impatience over the delay before new vehicles were ready to serve their routes.

Before putting a newly delivered streetcar into service, the TTC tested its components, performed 600 kilometres (370 mi) of test running on the street, and installed the Presto fare machines. If the testing went well, the TTC would release the new streetcar into revenue service.

==== Delivery problems ====
In December 2014, Bombardier was behind schedule in delivering new vehicles. By mid-December, Bombardier should have delivered 43 vehicles but had only delivered three. Seven new vehicles should have been delivered in 2013. TTC CEO Andy Byford had warned Bombardier that he would insist that they meet the final schedule of all vehicles in time for new streetcars to replace the old fleet by 2019, or he would impose penalty clauses in the delivery contract. One additional vehicle was expected to be delivered before the end of the year.

In January 2015, the Leslie Barns facility for the new vehicles was expected to be almost empty when it opened in 2015, as Bombardier had fallen so far behind in delivery. In February 2015, TTC chair Josh Colle said Bombardier had agreed to deliver vehicles more frequently, and he expected a total of 30 vehicles to be delivered by the end of 2015. That goal was only achieved one year later at the end of 2016. According to the original plan, Bombardier was to have delivered 73 Flexity Outlook streetcars by the end of 2015.

By mid-October 2015, Bombardier admitted it had another production problem at its Ciudad Sahagún plant in Mexico, the same one responsible for faulty under-frames and sides on the new streetcars. The new problem is the "crimping of electrical connectors" causing new production and delivery delays. To correct the crimping issue, Bombardier has to effectively check 20,000 wires per vehicle requiring about 13 to 16 extra shifts per vehicle. Bombardier hopes to make up for the delay in 2016, when it would produce one streetcar every five days. Welding at the Ciudad Sahagún plant was also causing production problems. There was an inadequate knowledge transfer from German staff. Until 2016, there was also a high turnover of Mexican welders because of better-paying jobs elsewhere. To address the problem, Bombardier had to hire more expertise and strive to retain plant staff. Six welding techniques were originally used to build Flexity Outlook components, but this was later reduced to two to simplify production.

The earlier welding problems at the Ciudad Sahagún plant had an impact on the Thunder Bay plant. Bombardier also had promised to deliver four more new streetcars in April with the commitment to have 54 streetcars running in Toronto by the end of 2016. However, Bombardier backed off this promise, saying it would only deliver 16 new streetcars in 2016, that is, 13 more than had already been delivered by April 25, 2016, an average of fewer than two deliveries per month. Bombardier says it will use a second manufacturing plant in La Pocatière, Quebec, along with an additional assembly line in an unspecified location to help with production being completed in Thunder Bay. Bombardier hopes that the La Pocatière site will address the "dimensional issues with some parts and sub-assemblies" that delay delivery.

On September 28, 2016, TTC CEO Andy Byford said that there were 22 of the new streetcars in operation, and expressed doubts that Bombardier would be able to meet its promise of 30 total deliveries by the end of 2016. However, Bombardier shipped the 30th vehicle on December 14, which arrived in Toronto on December 21. With the TTC's permission, Bombardier shipped the last four Flexity Outlook streetcars of 2016 to the Hillcrest Complex in an almost-finished state and completed them at the Leslie Barns. This allowed Bombardier to meet its 2016 delivery promise. However, according to Bombardier's original delivery plan, there should have been 100 Flexity streetcars in Toronto at the end of 2016.

In January 2017, the TTC claimed that delays in delivery of the Flexity Outlook streetcars had resulted in both streetcar and bus shortages. Because the old CLRV and ALRV streetcars required extra maintenance, only 170 of the 200 old streetcars could be put into service. This shortage led to the replacement of streetcars by buses on some routes, which in turn led to a reduction of service on some bus routes.

According to its revised plan issued in May 2016, Bombardier would deliver 40 streetcars in 2017, 76 in 2018 and 58 in 2019 to complete the 204-vehicle order. On October 12, 2017, Bombardier stated that it would deliver 35 Flexity Outlook streetcars by the end of 2017 instead of the planned 40. The company cited supply chain problems and that, to address these problems, it was setting up a second production site in addition to Thunder Bay, seeking additional suppliers and asking existing suppliers to increase their production.

On January 1, 2018, the TTC announced that Bombardier had delivered 59 streetcars to date instead of the 65 it had predicted in October 2017 or the revised prediction of 63 from December. Thus, Bombardier delivered 29 streetcars in 2017 instead of the 35 predicted in October. In a December 21 email to the Toronto Star, Bombardier said it was still "mitigating issues in our supply chain". However, according to Bombardier's original delivery plan, there should have been 150 Flexity streetcars in Toronto at the end of 2017. TTC interim CEO Rick Leary revealed that the TTC was working on a contingency plan in the event that Bombardier missed the 2019 deadline.

In February 2018, Bombardier announced it would set up a second production line in Kingston, Ontario to complement production at its Thunder Bay plant. The Kingston production line would require at least 100 new Bombardier employees and would start production of Toronto Flexity streetcars in the third quarter of 2018. With two production lines, Bombardier plans to deliver 65 streetcars in 2018, and 77 in 2019. By December 2018, the TTC had 117 Flexity streetcars available for revenue service with four more approved for delivery. Bombardier had promised to deliver 121 streetcars by the end of 2018. Bombardier had invested $20 million to increase production capacity and began to produce Flexity streetcars at its Kingston facility in December 2018 (three months later than planned) as well as at Thunder Bay.

At a TTC board meeting on October 24, 2019, Bombardier said it lost money on the TTC order for Flexity streetcars, as customizing the Flexity Outlook model for Toronto's environment was not as easy as Bombardier had expected. The difficulties were adapting the vehicle to the non-standard track gauge, grades and sharp curves of the system, and replacing the type of steel used in order to resist salt corrosion. Another problem was the inadequate knowledge transfer of skills from Germany to the Bombardier plant in Mexico. At the time of this announcement, Bombardier had shipped 188 streetcars to Toronto and expected to ship the remaining 16 by the end of the year. However, Bombardier admitted that one of its suppliers, that produced doors and braking systems among other components, was having production difficulties.

On January 24, 2020, the TTC took delivery of the last of the 204 ordered from Bombardier. Streetcar 4603 was delivered by rail to the Hillcrest Complex from Thunder Bay. The last streetcar was a little over three weeks late, as Bombardier had promised to deliver the last car by the end of 2019. Just eight of the vehicles had been completed in Bombardier's Kingston plant; Bombardier had planned to have 30 vehicles manufactured there. Streetcar 4403 was delivered as a prototype and was sent back to Bombardier in May 2018 for conversion to TTC requirements; the modified streetcar was delivered on May 11, 2020.

==== Welding issues ====
In early July 2018, Bombardier announced it was recalling 67 of the 89 Flexity streetcars already delivered in order to correct a welding defect. The work is needed to allow the streetcars to last 30 years, their contractual service life. Some welds were not properly fused in several areas of the vehicle, such as on the bogie and the articulated portals. Bombardier would do the corrective work at its plant in La Pocatière, Quebec, with each vehicle requiring 19 weeks to repair.

On September 7, 2018, Flexity Outlook 4400 was the first to be pulled from service and sent by rail to La Pocatière. Bombardier expects to return it in June 2019. After fixing the first four or five vehicles, Bombardier expects a quicker turnaround for subsequent vehicles. Prototype 4401 had already been sent to La Pocatière in May 2018, but it was never in revenue service as Bombardier had not yet modified it to TTC requirements. Originally, the last affected streetcar was to be returned to Toronto by 2023. However, due to the decline in ridership in 2020 because of the COVID-19 pandemic, the TTC was able to send 22 instead of 7 streetcars at a time back to Bombardier for warranty repairs. The TTC expects all warranty work to be completed by the end of 2021 based on the revised schedule.

==== Legal action against Bombardier ====
On October 16, 2015, the TTC announced that it has asked its board to consider legal action against Bombardier. TTC staff is recommending that the TTC board "commence legal action, or make a claim allowed for already in the contract, of $50 million for late delivery" against Bombardier. Bombardier had committed to delivering 67 streetcars to the TTC by October 2015, but only ten were in service at the time.

On October 28, 2015, the TTC board voted in favour of a lawsuit against Bombardier "for at least $50 million to recoup lost costs", according to Chair Josh Colle, because of the company's failure to deliver the additional Flexity streetcars. TTC chief executive Andy Byford indicated that he was not interested in the money per se, and simply wants the streetcars. In a statement late that afternoon, Bombardier responded that it would not comment on the TTC's plan and would not offer "any speculation on potential impacts" on their operations. In April 2019, the TTC and Bombardier reached a settlement for an undisclosed sum.

=== Order options ===
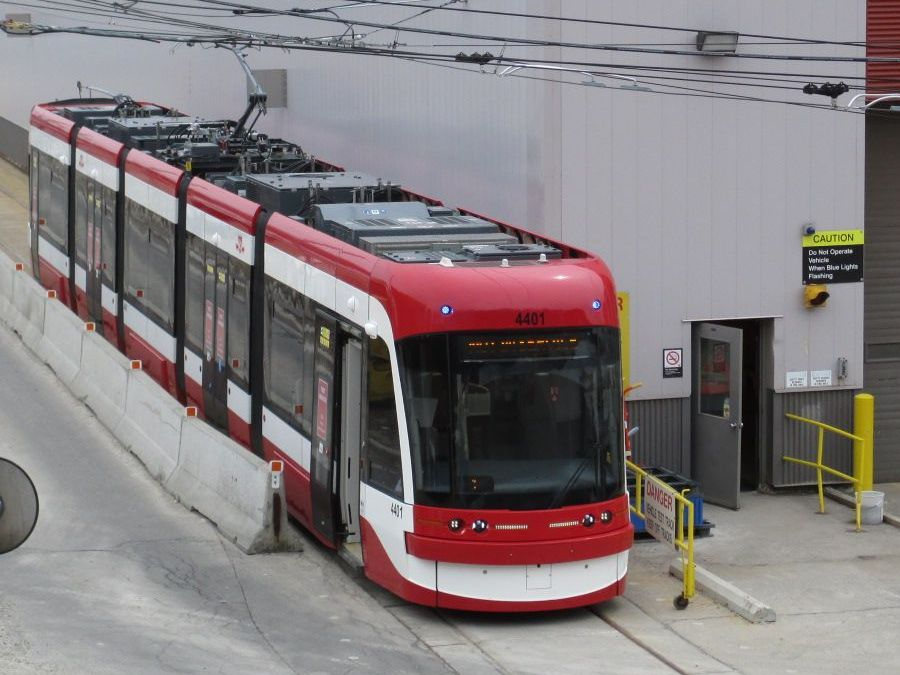
View of the roof with trolley pole lowered and pantograph raised at Hillcrest Complex

As early as June 2013, TTC CEO Andy Byford expressed the need for the TTC to order an additional 60 vehicles. According to a 2015 TTC report, the extra vehicles would address rising streetcar demand due to residential growth downtown. The option for 60 additional vehicles would cost of $361 million. The TTC can purchase an additional 60 vehicles at the current price, if the additional vehicles are ordered before the 60th vehicle is delivered. In September 2016, the TTC Board rejected the recommendation citing the Bombardier Flexity delivery delays, the extra cost of keeping the old fleet running, and the possibility of buying buses at a lower price with federal funding. Byford said that using buses instead of streetcars was inefficient due to capacity differences. TTC Chair Josh Colle said not considering the option is part of "our ongoing dramas and pressures with Bombardier." According to the Bombardier contract, the option for an additional 60 streetcars expired when the 60th car of the original order was delivered.

The Flexity contract originally specified the installation of pantographs only for the first 60 vehicles. On February 24, 2014, the TTC exercised an option to put pantographs on the remaining 144 vehicles at a cost of $4.5 million.

==== Additional options ====
In January 2018, the TTC Corporate Plan noted that 150 additional streetcars could be purchased by 2022 to increase system capacity, as well as to serve extensions along the city waterfront. In October 2020, the TTC board approved the purchase of 13 additional Flexity streetcars for $140 million, with an option to purchase up to 60 streetcars if additional funding became available. In May 2021, an agreement was reached to order 60 streetcars and expand the Hillcrest Complex at a cost of $568 million, with the cost shared between the three tiers of government. The Flexity streetcars would be built at the former Bombardier plant in Thunder Bay. Delivery of the vehicles was estimated to begin in 2023. These streetcars are to be built by Alstom following their acquisition of Bombardier Transportation in 2021.

The TTC put the first vehicles of the 60-vehicle order into service on the 504 King route on November 17, 2023. The TTC expected the remaining vehicles to be delivered by 2025. The cost of the order comes out of a $568 million streetcar program, which also covers reconfiguring the Hillcrest Complex to store at least 25 streetcars. The program cost was jointly funded by the federal and provincial governments ($180 million each), and the City of Toronto ($208 million).

== Operational history ==
=== Introduction into service ===
The Flexity Outlook streetcars were first introduced on the 510 Spadina line on August 31, 2014, with a full conversion to Flexity Outlook streetcars since January 3, 2016, making it the first fully accessible TTC streetcar line in the city. On September 12, 2017, 509 Harbourfront became the first streetcar route to operate Flexity streetcars with electrical pickup by pantograph instead of trolley pole. However, carhouse movements still had to be made using the trolley pole with the changeover at Exhibition Loop.

=== Rollout ===
The following table presents the rollout dates for Flexity Outlook streetcars by route. However, it does not give the current vehicle status for a route; for current streetcar route status, see Toronto streetcar system § Routes.

Route	Date of introduction	Remarks
510 Spadina	August 31, 2014	
509 Harbourfront	March 29, 2015	
514 Cherry	June 19, 2016	Operated from June 19, 2016, until October 7, 2018, when this route was discontinued and was replaced by two overlapping branches of the 504 King route.
512 St. Clair	September 3, 2017	Two-hour unlimited transfer pilot project ended upon the arrival of the first Flexity vehicle onto the route.
504 King	January 2, 2018	Some service started earlier: in January 2017 on weekends and holidays only, and on weekdays from December 4, 2017, to address increased ridership as a result of the King Street Transit Priority Corridor
501 Queen	January 6, 2019	Weekend service using the new Flexity Outlook streetcars began in September 2018; Flexity Outlook service seven days per week – mainly between Humber Loop and Neville Park Loop – began on January 6, 2019, and was extended to include full-time all-day service from Humber Loop to Long Branch Loop on September 1, 2019. The Humber–Long Branch portion was rebranded as 507 Long Branch in November 2023).
511 Bathurst	2015	They were used seasonally on several occasions from 2015, such as during the 2015 Pan American Games between July 10 and 26, 2015, and during the Canadian National Exhibition every summer since then (excluding the COVID-19 pandemic years) until the service became full time. Flexity Outlook service started full time on December 29, 2019, after the retirement of CLRVs from route 511.
508 Lake Shore	September 3, 2019	Service was suspended from March 2020 to October 30, 2023, due to lower ridership caused by the COVID-19 pandemic and subsequent reconstruction projects.
506 Carlton	October 13, 2019	
505 Dundas	April 20, 2020	
503 Kingston Rd	June 22, 2020	

=== 2018 ===
On February 20, 2018, the use of trolley poles on Flexity Outlook streetcars led to dewirements and damaged overhead infrastructure at the grand union intersection of King Street and Spadina Avenue, and along St. Clair Avenue. The trolley pole shoe contains a carbon insert to provide electrical contact with the overhead wire and to lower the shoe to clear overhead wire hangers. Carbon inserts wear out and must be periodically replaced. The inserts on Flexity Outlook vehicles quickly wore out in rainy conditions, lasting less than eight hours instead of the expected one to two days for rainy weather. Flexity Outlook streetcars draw more current than the older CLRV and ALRV fleet, and this also shortened the life of the carbon insert. Eventually, all overhead wires will be converted for pantograph use, resolving this problem.

In a heavy rainstorm on the evening of August 7, 2018, nine Flexity streetcars were damaged by flooding. Two streetcars were severely damaged after being partly submerged under a flooded underpass on King Street west of Sudbury Street after a flash flood blew a manhole cover. These two streetcars were sent to Bombardier's plant in Kanona, New York for restoration and replacement of damaged electrical components. Two other substantially damaged Flexity streetcars would be stored at the Leslie Barns for few months to effect repairs by Bombardier staff. Five others had only minor damage and were repaired within a few weeks. None of the damage was due to manufacturing problems. The TTC has since revised operating procedures to avoid flood damage to streetcars.

=== 2019 ===
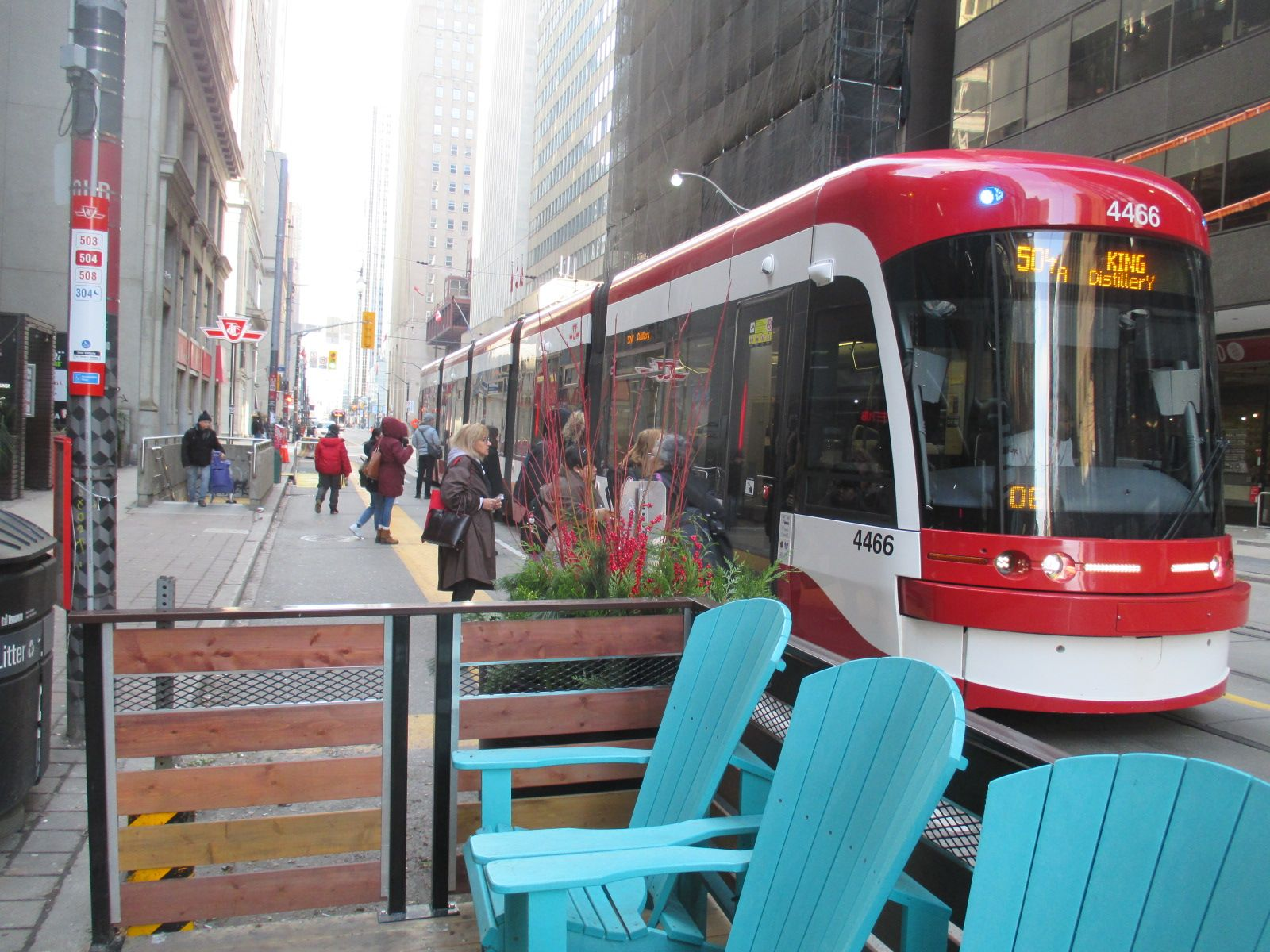
Flexity Outlook on the King Street Transit Priority Corridor in 2019

As of early 2019, Flexity Outlook streetcars have not been meeting expectations for reliability. The mean distance between failures (MDBF) for Flexity streetcars is expected to be 35,000 kilometres (22,000 mi). (MDBF includes only those failures that delay service by five minutes or more.) However, in March 2019, the MDBF was 13,223 kilometres (8,216 mi), a decrease of 1,554 kilometres (966 mi) from March 2018 and a decrease of 81 kilometres (50 mi) February 2019. Failures have occurred for the hydraulic brake system, doors, propulsion systems, wheel flange lubricators, among other parts. According to the May 2019 TTC CEO report, "Bombardier has developed various vehicle modification programs to help improve reliability." Despite these problems, the TTC is satisfied with the overall performance of the Flexity fleet, especially in winter.

On November 27, 2019, the TTC replaced all 35 Flexity streetcars operating on route 501 Queen with approximately 90 buses because of damage to the emergency brake system on 25 streetcars serving the route. The Flexity emergency brake system has metal bars that sit parallel to the rails and drop to the rails during hard braking in order to supplement the streetcar's disc brakes. A stationary object on the ground struck the metal bars on the left side of 22 streetcars travelling on route 501. Some metal bars were knocked off the streetcar, raising the risk of a derailment. The problem was compounded by an insufficient supply of replacement parts to repair all damaged vehicles. On November 28 and 29, 2019, the TTC ran test vehicles along the line with cameras pointed at the metal bar and determined that a 15-centimetre (6 in) piece of broken rail was the cause of the problem. The TTC suspected that the problem might have resolved itself during routine track maintenance. Route 501 service resumed on November 30, 2019, with spare CLRVs used to offset Flexity Outlook streetcars yet to be repaired.

In December 2019, the Canadian Light Rail Vehicle was retired from service, with the last of the 204 Flexity streetcars ordered delivered in January 2020. Due to construction projects and a shortage of streetcars, the Flexity streetcars did not enter service on all routes until mid-2020 during the early stages of the COVID-19 pandemic.

=== Since 2020 ===
In January 2020, the TTC planned to reduce streetcar frequency by 25 percent because the Flexity Outlook streetcars can carry more passengers than the older vehicles. Thus, a route that used to operate with a frequency of 5 minutes with older streetcars would operate with a frequency of 6 minutes and 15 seconds with Flexity Outlook streetcars. To compensate for the lower frequency, there would be less crowding on the longer Flexity Outlook cars, and running fewer streetcars was projected to save the TTC $45 million per year in labour costs.

By January 2020, after the retirement of the older CLRV and ALRV fleet, there were insufficient streetcars to service all streetcar routes for the foreseeable future, and the continued use of replacement buses was required. On routes that did use streetcars, buses may have supplemented streetcars during busy periods. In May 2021, 60 additional Flexity Outlook streetcars were ordered to satisfy growth in ridership to 2026, as well as to serve potential new or extended lines.

On February 18, 2024, the first four out of 60 additional Flexity streetcars were delivered. On December 16, 2025, the last of the 60-vehicle order went into service.

== Maintenance ==
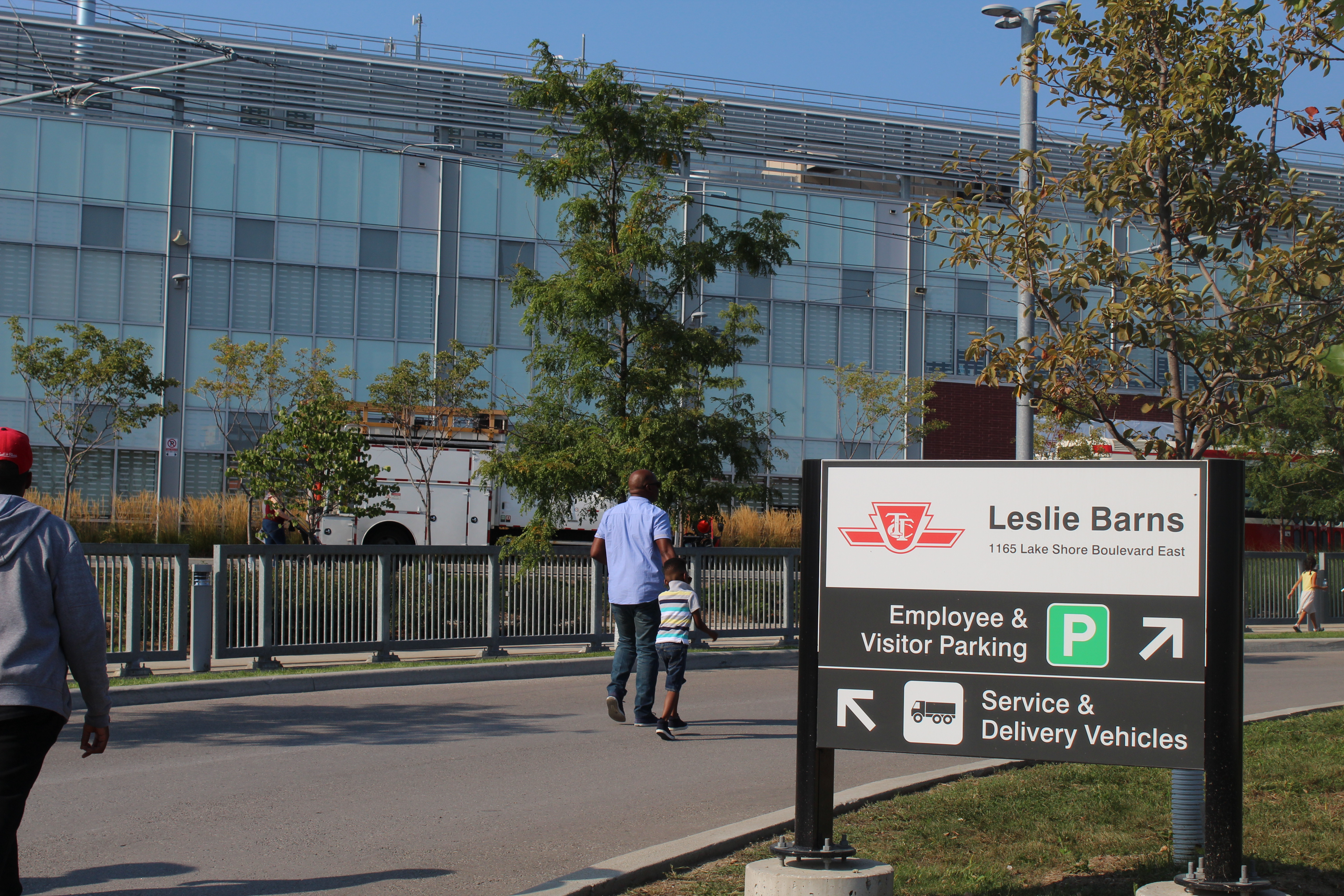
Leslie Barns maintenance and storage facility, which opened in 2015

The two existing carhouses had been designed to service the older high-floor streetcars with most equipment located under the vehicle floor, as opposed to low-floor vehicles with equipment located on the roof. They also did not meet the sufficient capacity to store all of the 30-metre (98 ft) Flexity streetcars.

On November 22, 2015, the TTC opened the Leslie Barns maintenance and storage facility, at the corner of Leslie Street and Lake Shore Boulevard East, exclusively to service the Flexity vehicles. A new building was also constructed at Roncesvalles Carhouse on the Queensway at Roncesvalles Avenue at the southern end of Roncesvalles Village to service the Flexity vehicles. In May 2021, it was announced that the Hillcrest Complex will be expanded and upgraded, allowing 60 additional streetcars to be delivered.

The TTC had set a target of 35,000 kilometres (22,000 mi) between failures for the Flexity streetcars, compared with about 7,000 kilometres (4,300 mi) on average between failures on the old fleet. The TTC had encountered door and communications problems with the delivered units. In December 2018, units failed on average after 12,500 km (7,800 mi) of service. Bombardier planned to resolve this problem in early 2019.

In February 2020, Bombardier informed the TTC that falling behind in maintaining its Flexity fleet could cause premature wear and higher rates of breakdown, and impact warranty coverage. The TTC had paused the vehicles' maintenance program in October 2019 due to the workload required to deal with Bombardier's welding repair program and to address broken brake shoes caused by a track defect. The TTC expected to resume the program in April 2020 amid the COVID-19 pandemic in Toronto and the resultant reduction in ridership as well as to clear up a 25-car backlog within six months. The maintenance program applies to Flexity Outlook streetcars that have been in service for two years and involves inspecting components such as gear box, driver controller, power unit, and doors.

== Training ==
To train drivers on the Flexity Outlook vehicles, a customized vehicular driving simulator is used, allowing navigation of the TTC's entire streetcar network using controls similar to those on the vehicles themselves. About a dozen landmark buildings and structures are depicted in the simulation, such as the CN Tower, Toronto City Hall and El Mocambo live music and entertainment venue at the northern end of Chinatown with most of the buildings along the simulated route being generic.

The simulator features a full-scale Flexity Outlook cab with the windshield replaced by a curved computer graphics screen. The trainee in the cab can hear simulated street sounds. Connected to the simulator is a nearby trainer's station, from which a trainer can simulate problems for the trainee such as traffic interference, weather conditions, power outages and random passenger conversations. The simulator can track trainee errors. Initially installed at Hillcrest Complex, the simulator was later moved to Leslie Barns, the main streetcar maintenance facility.
