= Braking test track =

The braking test track is a fundamental element of the vehicle industry proving grounds, designed for conducting vehicle braking system operability and efficiency tests under various braking circumstances. Such types of tests are highly significant in regard to road safety. Testing is an indispensable step prior to manufacturing newly developed braking systems and enabling their utilization under real traffic circumstances. The effects of all factors other than human factors influencing the process of braking can be thoroughly tested in a testing environment designed to this end, i.e. on a braking test track.

== Structure and characteristics ==
Several lanes enabling braking under different material characteristic conditions are necessary for testing as many of the circumstances that directly influence the braking effect as possible. Consequently, most of the traditional or so-called classic test tracks have several (5 to 8) differently paved braking lanes. Most test tracks attempt to provide surfaces with both higher and lower grip coefficients for testing and developing companies. Asphalt (with a higher and lower coefficient), basalt, ceramic and concrete are frequently used materials for surface paving. Certain test tracks even have chequer surfaces with alternative tiles of higher and lower coefficients, increasing the challenge for intelligent braking systems.

The number of settings provided by the available surfaces may be doubled by wetting them, for which mostly a 1–2 mm thick water coating is used. So-called aquaplaning lanes are also frequently provided for testers. The triggering of the phenomenon of aquaplaning, however, requires the provision of higher water levels. It is also important to provide for the collection of the water spilt onto the wettable braking surfaces, which is in most cases managed by using ditches.

In order to enable the testing of extreme braking situations, e.g. emergency braking from high speed, it is necessary for the lanes to be designed with a length of typically 150–250 m. Additionally acceleration lanes with the appropriate length are also required for reaching high speed, which enable even heavy-duty vehicles to reach 100 km/h. This way it becomes possible to test the braking systems of trucks and buses.

An adequate amount of data and test results are necessary to draw the conclusions, which can be achieved by repeated tests. In order to perform repeated tests fluently and safely it is necessary to design a route separated from the test (braking) zone that allows the test vehicle to return to the beginning of the acceleration lane quickly and safely.

== Goal and utilization ==
=== The significance of braking system testing ===
The braking systems of vehicles, especially those of motorised vehicles play a highly important role in road safety. The activation of the braking systems decelerates and stops the vehicle (or keeps it in an immobile standing position, e.g. with the handbrake). Depending on the country, different national or occasionally international regulations apply to braking systems. The braking effect of an installed system depends on several factors, e.g. on the human factors (routine, health condition and mental state of the driver), technical factors (structure of the system, technical condition of the individual components), weather (e.g. wet, icy surfaces), and the condition and quality of the pavement. Braking test tracks enable the testing of such technical, meteorological and pavement factors.

=== Traditional tests ===
Most traditional test tracks are equipped with surfaces suitable for testing ABS, ATC, ESP systems as well as brakeforce intervention systems connected to all braking systems. At the same time such surfaces are also suitable for the testing of other active systems.

=== Automatic Emergency Braking System tests ===
The number of necessary vehicle industry tests has multiplied with the implementation of ADAS (advanced driver-assistance systems). The combining of several functions has made the planned tests more complex too. Recently an increasing number of cars are equipped with emergency braking systems. Such systems need to be capable of sensing an obstacle which triggers the command that initiates the braking; at the same time, however, the appropriate intervention (braking) is also indispensable. Protocols for such tests, which all developers strive to comply with (Euro NCAP active safety system tests), already exist; these tests are conducted, however, under highly limited, well predefined circumstances. It is practical to carry out such tests on several different surfaces.

=== Platooning tests ===
Platooning tests, i.e. testing vehicles advancing in convoy pose a further challenge. A typical situation to be tested is when the first vehicle produces a signal for intervention (which could even be an intervention based on sensing), and then transmits it to the following vehicles, which need to receive and process the signal with the least possible latency, and initiate the necessary intervention.

=== Other tests ===
It is not unusual to use a braking test track for testing the efficiency of the braking system of a vehicle crossing several different lanes angularly.

== Braking test tracks on existing proving grounds ==
Most proving grounds in Europe have braking test tracks. The most well-known examples are the Boxberg Proving Ground constructed by Bosch (Germany), Automotive Testing Papenburg GmbH constructed by Daimler (Germany), Applus Idiada (Spain), Aldenhoven Testing Center (Germany). The Zalaegerszeg Test Track currently under construction in Hungary will also feature a braking test track.

=== Boxberg Proving Ground, Boxberg, Germany ===
The braking test track of the Boxberg Proving Ground provides testing opportunities under various grip conditions on its seven lanes differing in quality and grip and its track sections equipped with track wetting functions. The surface of the braking test track is partially shared with one of the acceleration lanes of the dynamic platform.

Available lanes: chequered lane, asphalt, ceramic, basalt (polished), concrete, aquaplaning lane, basalt concrete.

=== Automotive Testing Papenburg GmbH, Papenburg, Germany ===
The 300 m long braking test track of the Papenburg Test Ground provides testing opportunities on eight lanes differing in quality and grip, which can be wetted as preferred; furthermore which are connected through a 280 long and 30 m wide acceleration lane to the oval platform, thus enabling acceleration to higher speeds. The braking test track is closed with a 150 m long asphalt safety surface.

Available lanes: chequered lane, asphalt (100 m aquaplaning lane), mixed basalt & asphalt, basalt (polished), asphalt, concrete, “blue asphalt”.

=== Aldenhoven Testing Center, Aldenhoven, Germany ===
The length of the braking test track at the Aldenhoven Testing Center is 150 m, which contains an asphalt and a ceramic pavement lane. Both lanes are 4 m wide and may be wetted as preferred. The braking test lane is surrounded on both sides by a safety zone. A 200 m access acceleration lane is also part of the braking test track.

=== Applus Idiada, Spain, Tarragona ===
The braking test track at Applus Idiada is divided into two separate zones.

Zone 1 may be used only by one a vehicle at a time. The surface used for the braking tests is 250 m long and has five lanes with different kinds of pavement. The lanes may be wetted as preferred. The braking test track is closed with a safety area.

Lanes: concrete, basalt, asphalt, ceramic, aquaplaning lane

Zone 2 may be used by two vehicles simultaneously, as there is a dividing area between the two lanes used for braking tests. Both lanes are 250 m long and 5 m wide and are paved with asphalt; one of them, however, is not wettable.

=== Zala ZONE Vehicle Industry Test Track, Zalaegerszeg, Hungary ===
The braking test track under construction at the Zala ZONE Vehicle Industry Test Track is designed for testing ABS, ATC and ESP systems; it has six special, differently paved and lanes, which can be wetted separately by the inbuilt wetting and draining system. Its 700 m acceleration lane and 200 m long braking surface enables the testing of longer combination vehicles as well.
