= Spadina Hotel =

Building in Toronto, Ontario, Canada

Coordinates: 43.645701°N 79.395506°W

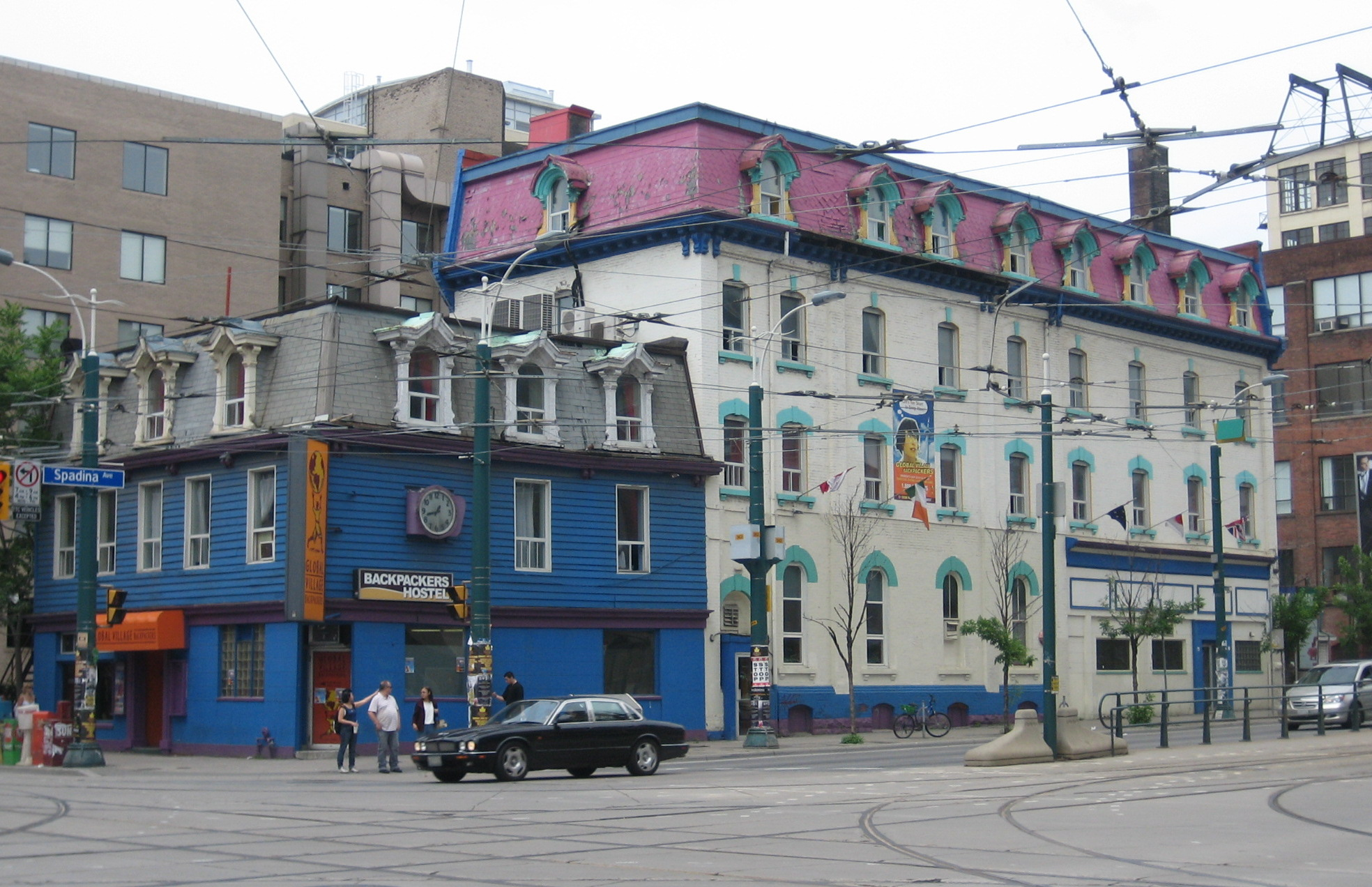
The brightly coloured Global Village Backpackers

The Spadina Hotel was one of the names of the hotels operated at 460 King Street West, in Toronto, at the corner of Spadina Avenue and King Street. The hotel was built in late 1873, the three storey Victorian building featuring a small clock on the east facade. A four-storey annex was later built to the north of the hotel. It has been known by at least half dozen names, and has had many proprietors. It is now a commercial office building including a programming school.

== History ==
Initially the hotel was owned by James Richardson, and known as Richardson House. Robert Falconer acquired it in 1906, and renamed it the Hotel Falconer. Charles Zeigler acquired it in 1914, and renamed it the Zeigler′s Hotel. In 1917 the Chartered Trust and Executor Company foreclosed on the hotel′s mortgage. The property was transferred to the Imperial Bank of Canada. According to a 1917 report in the Financial Post, at the time of the foreclosure the building was worth $12,500 CAD. According to the Financial Post the next hotel to open in the building was a ″temperance hotel″.

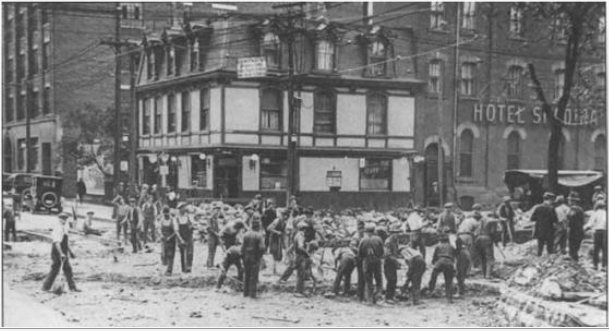
In 1921 the hotel bore a large sign saying ″Hotel Spadina″.

Toronto Sun columnist Mike Filey speculated that the 1917 change of name from the Zeigler Hotel to the Hotel Spadina was to counter prejudice against German names during World War I. The Hotel operated under the names Hotel Spadina, or Spadina Hotel for the next eighty years.

In 1982 Douglas Martin, of the New York Times, described the hotel′s bar as a ″cozy, mainly working-class bar″, while he reported Canadians' reaction to one of Pierre Trudeau's speeches.

Over its history it has been home to many notable residents. In the 1960s and 1970s it was a centre of the Queen Street West music scene, and saw such visitors as Leonard Cohen and the Rolling Stones. On the second level, the Cabana Room was a central venue to the strip. The Jack Nicholson film The Last Detail was also partially filmed at the hotel.

According to the National Post, Ernest Hemingway, who was a reporter for the Toronto Star before he became a famous writer, used to stay there. They reported that Leonard Cohen and the Tragically Hip used to perform there. According to the BC Music Review, it was also one of the venues of Toronto's punk scene.

The hotel was renamed the Global Village Backpackers in 1997 and the once seedy hotel became a welcoming youth hostel to Toronto, Ontario. With 190 beds (four people per room) it was the largest youth hostel in Toronto. The hostel closed on January 20, 2014.

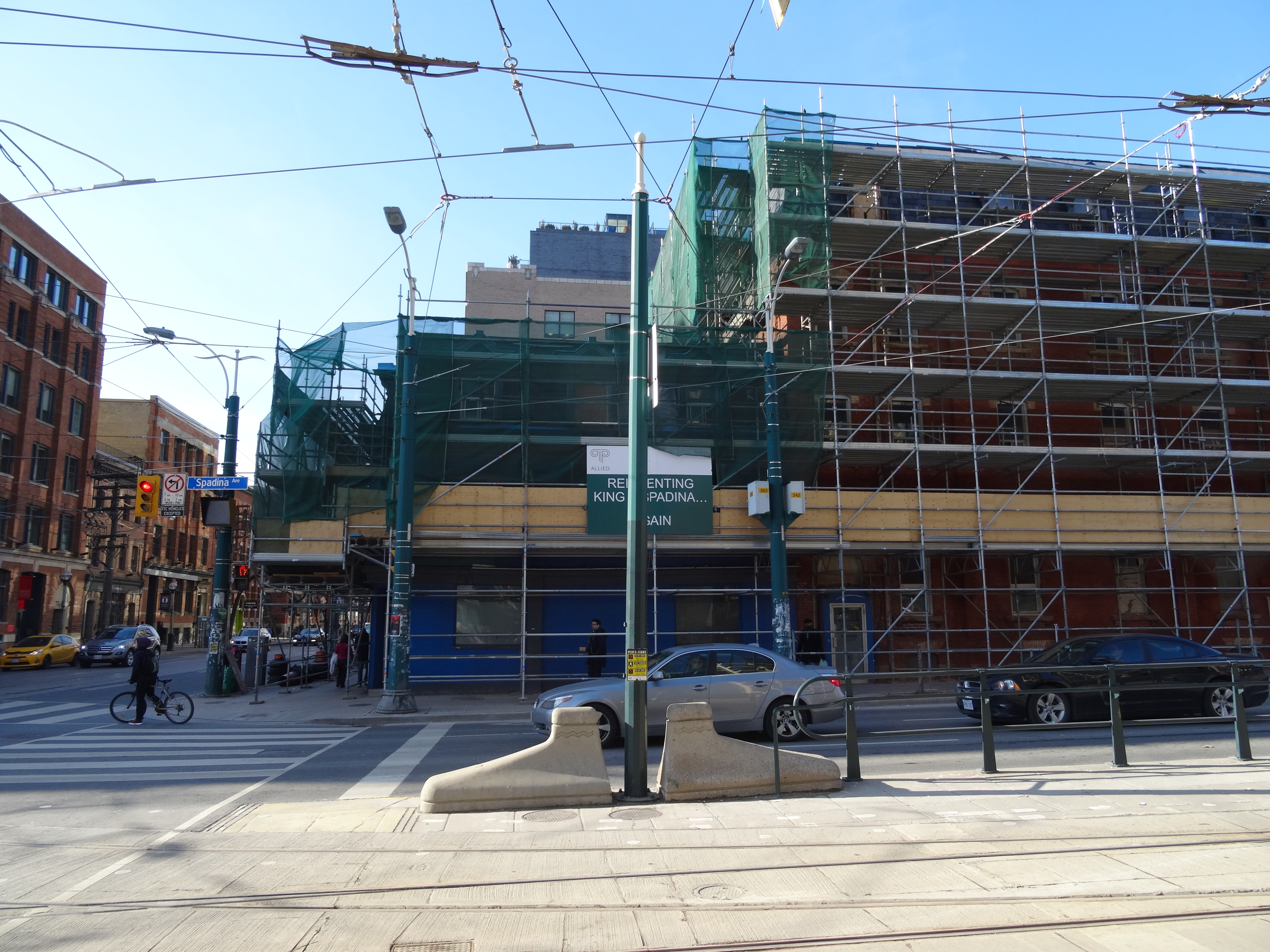
The Hotel's new owners stripped decades of paint off the east and south facades in late 2014.

In July 2014, Allied Properties Real Estate Investment Trust announced it was in negotiations to purchase the Hotel and the property it sat on. When the purchase was finalized in November 2014 Allied completed its ownership of all the properties between King and Adelaide. After its purchase, Allied clad the building in scaffolding, and began repairs to the facade, which had fallen into disrepair.

Konrad Group announced the launch of a new "innovation hub" at the iconic corner in 2015. The "hub" is the home and headquarters for BrainStation, Konrad Group's digital and technology training arm.
