= Toronto subway rolling stock =

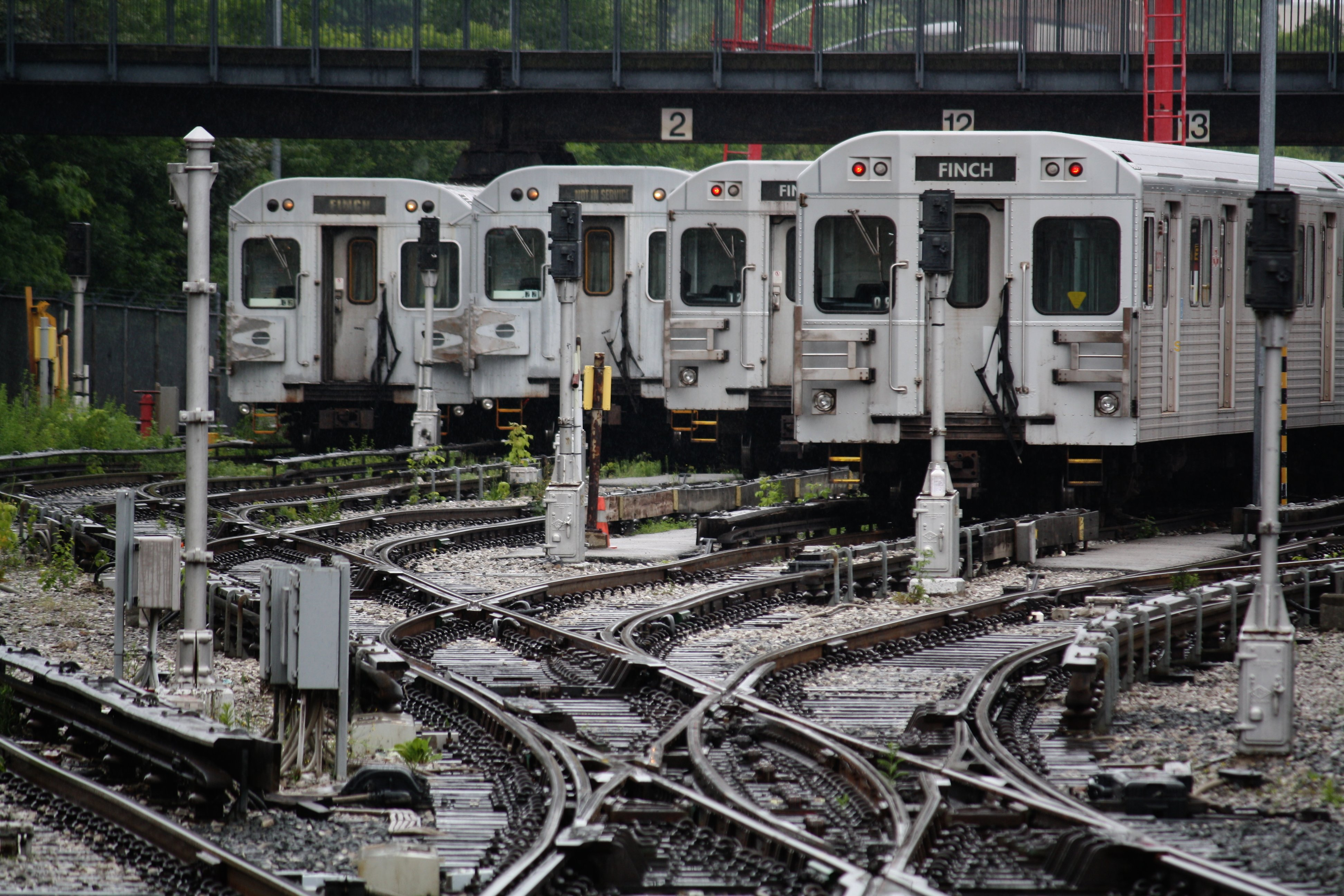
H-5 and T-1 trains parked at the Davisville Subway Yard

The Toronto subway system's rolling stock consists of 880 subway cars for Line 1 Yonge–University, Line 2 Bloor–Danforth, and Line 4 Sheppard. The rolling stock is owned and maintained by the Toronto Transit Commission.

== Subway trains ==
Identifier	Quantity	Year(s) built	Builder & model	Class	Date retired	Notes
5000–5099	100	1953–1954	GRC&W	G-1	October 6, 1990	5080–5081 experimentally retrofitted with fluorescent lighting. 5068–5069 converted to service cars RT 36 & RT 37 (grinding train power units) in February 1991; 5066–5067 & 5074–5075 had been held for future conversion to service cars; 5098–5099 preserved by the Ontario Electric Railway Historical Association.
5100–5105	6	1954–1955	GRC&W	G-2	October 6, 1990	Experimental aluminum train
5200–5227	28	1956	GRC&W	G-3	October 6, 1990	Non-driving motor cars permanently coupled with mating G-1 cars (50xx-52yy-52xx-50yy)
5110–5115	6	1958–1959	GRC&W	G-4	October 6, 1990	Experimental cars built as an integral train (5110-5111-5112-5113-5114-5115); electro-dynamic braking equipment and motors removed April 1966 through March 1967 (for installation in service cars), and remarshalled as: 5110–5115, 5030-5111-5114-5031.
5300–5335	36	1962–1963	MLW	M-1	May 1, 1999	5300–5301 preserved by the OERHA
5336–5499	164	1965–1966	HSC RTC-75	H-1	November 29, 1999	5374–5375 rebuilt to service cars RT 9 & RT 10; 5388–5391 scrapped due to Christie station fire in October 1976; 5391 rebuilt to service car RT 23 in March 1984.
5500–5575	76	1971	HSC RTC-75	H-2	September 28, 2001	5500–5505 equipped with experimental Hitachi chopper controls and regenerative braking and reclassed as H-3 in 1973; converted back to H-2 between September 1984 and April 1985.
5576–5663	88	1974–1975	HSC RTC-75	H-4	January 27, 2012	Last subway cars outfitted with vinyl orange upholstered seats, also the last without air conditioning. They also had an interior design similar to the H-2 cars, with reduced seating in a 2+2 configuration (instead of 2+3) to allow for more standees. Some H-4 subway cars were retired from revenue service between 2000–2002 by the delivery of T-1 class cars. By January 27, 2012, all H-4 cars were retired from revenue service.
5670–5807	138	1976–1979	HSC RTC-75	H-5	June 14, 2013	5755 was retired in June 1984 and scrapped November 1985 due to accident in December 1981; 5754 modified in November 1985 for use as A or B unit to substitute for cars out of service for maintenance (can also operate as a single unit for testing); 5796 modified by UTDC in July–December 1990 to become T-1 prototype, which was retired and scrapped in September 2012; first subway cars outfitted with air-conditioning systems, all H-5 trains were retired from service by June 14, 2013, some of which were taken to Buffalo, New York for refurbishment, before being sold to the Lagos Rail Mass Transit, but scrapped by August 2015.
5810–5935	126	1986–1989	UTDC RTC-75	H-6	June 20, 2014	Accessible seating areas were added near the operator's cab and the first set of doors in each car during technological upgrades (like the T-1s) between 2005 and 2008. All H-6 trains were retired from service by June 20, 2014.
5000–5371	372	1995–2001	BT RTC-75	T-1	Active	First cars with AC propulsion, cars 5344–5345 converted to Toronto Rocket T35A08 mock-up cars in June–July 2006. Electronic side destination signs, including automated audible pre-boarding route and destination announcements and closed-circuit television cameras have since been installed on all T1 trains.
5381–5386 ⋮ 6131–6136; 6141/2/5/6 ⋮ 6191/2/5/6	480	2009–2015	BT T35A08	Toronto Rocket	Active	76 six-car permanently coupled trains with open gangways being delivered. First train delivered on October 1, 2010. Sets are numbered 5xx1-5xx2-5xx3-5xx4-5xx5-5xx6. In February 2013, set 5461–5466 was retrofitted with additional plastic yellow handholds, and external door chimes, displacing the exterior blue lights on the car. Similarly, another set, 5851–5856 was also modified with the same features as with set 5461–5466 in May 2014. External door chimes, electronic side destination signs, including automated audible pre-boarding route and destination announcements, have since been installed on all TR trains. First subway cars to adopt numbering in the 6000s. Set 5471–5476 was temporarily converted to a four-car train for testing purposes on Line 4 Sheppard, which was converted to full Toronto Rocket operation. After the testing phase, six additional four-car trains were received for use on Line 4, which reduced the original 80 six-car trainset order to 76 six-car trainsets. Unlike the six-car trains, the four-car trains feature two pairs of A (cab) and B (non-cab) cars, numbered 61x1-61x2-61x5-61x6. All six four-car TR Trains are in service on Line 4 and all seventy-six six-car TR Trains are in service on Line 1.

Builders
BT	Bombardier Transportation
GRC&W	Gloucester Railway Carriage & Wagon Co.
HSC	Hawker-Siddeley Canada
MLW	Montreal Locomotive Works
UTDC	Urban Transportation Development Corp.

All active Toronto Transit Commission (TTC) subway cars are equipped with flip-up seats located in each car (near the operator's cab), which can accommodate mobility devices such as wheelchairs, strollers, scooters, and bicycles. The new Toronto Rocket trains have two designated areas in each car with automatic flip-up seats, and high-level platforms allow access to all cars.

=== Toronto Rocket ===
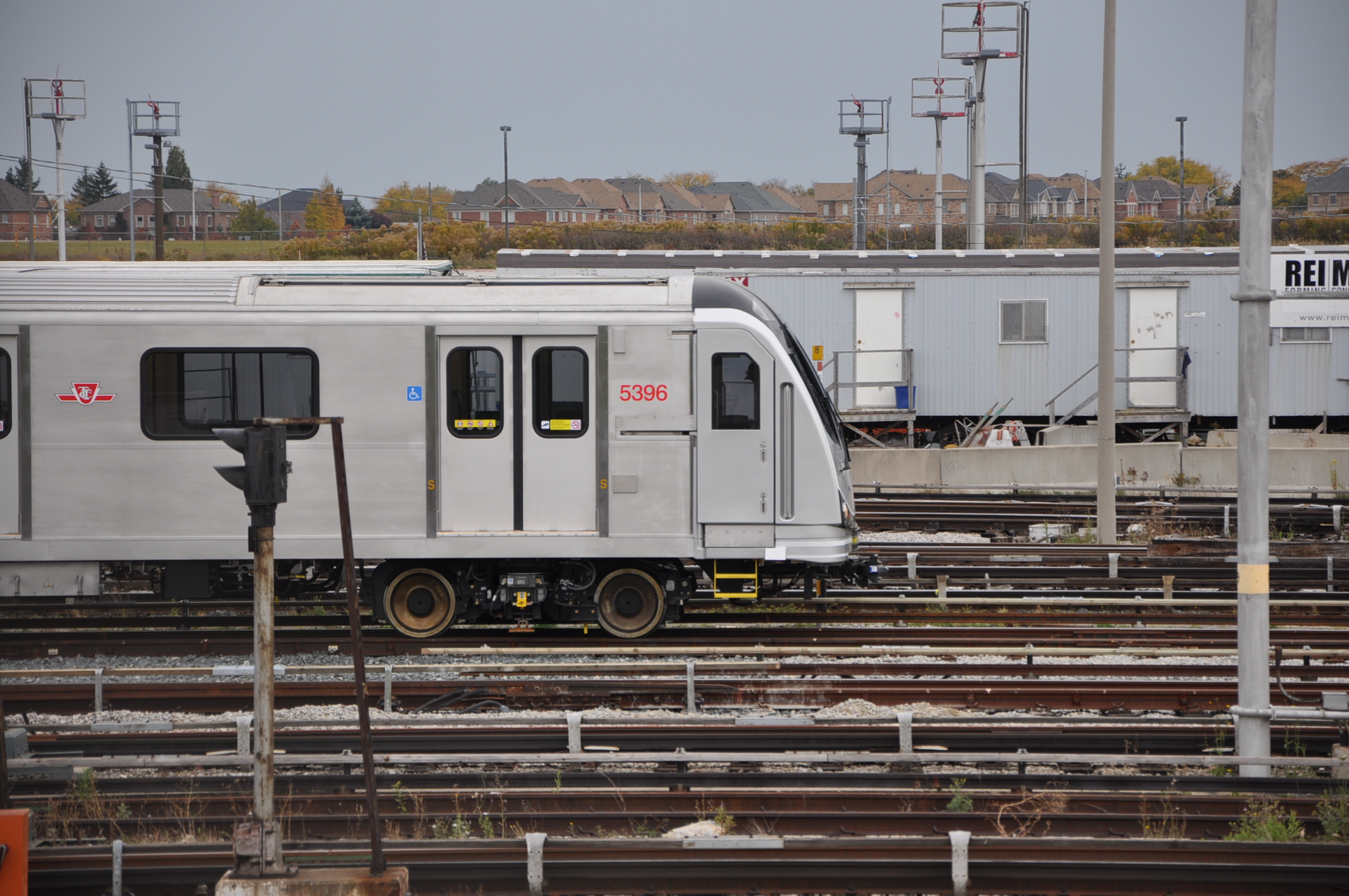
The front of the Toronto Rocket, Toronto's newest subway train, viewed from the side

As of January 2025, the Toronto Rocket (TR) is the newest version of TTC subway trains and operates on Lines 1 and 4. Its design differs from its predecessors, which were formed by coupling sets of married pairs of identical cars. The trains consist of six cars for Line 1 and four cars for Line 4, both of which are connected with open gangways, similar to Bombardier's Movia family of metro trains. They only have two full-width operator cabs per trainset (as opposed to one on the right-hand corner of every subway car on the older versions), greater accessibility options and the skin of the train is welded rather than the previously used riveting method. The TRs' exterior front and rear destination and train run number signs are outfitted with digital orange LED boards, while all previous TTC train models use back-lit roller signs.

The first of the new TR trains was scheduled to be delivered in late 2009, but in early 2010, TTC officials stated that the new trains would not enter service until late 2010. The first train arrived on TTC property in October 2010, and entered revenue service on July 21, 2011.

=== Next-generation cars ===
By 2022, the TTC had decided that the next generation of subway cars would have a design different from the T1 and TR fleets. Like the TR fleet, riders would be able to walk the full length of the interior of the new trains. Like the T1 trains and unlike the TR fleet, the new trains would consist of three coupled pairs. Only the two end cars of the new trains would have cabs; cab-less cars would have hostler controls to allow the independent movement of cab-less pairs within workshop areas.

In April 2024, a TTC staff report recommended ordering 80 new trains, 55 to replace the T1 fleet on Line 2 and 25 for Line 1. The estimated cost of the new trains was at $3.23 billion with the earliest delivery being in 2030, four years after the lifespan of the T1 fleet.

In July 2024, TTC CEO Rick Leary reported that the TTC would launch procurement for 70 new trains, pending funding from the federal government.

By March 2025, the federal government had signed an agreement for $2.3 billion in funding for the new trains. In August 2025, it was announced that the competitive procurement process which had been underway had been cancelled and that all new trains would be built at the Alstom Thunder Bay plant in a single-sourced contract. The decision was made to keep most of the work to build the new trains in Canada in the face of U.S. tariffs and economic uncertainty. All three levels of government agreed to equally share the cost of the Alstom contract, which would be subject to an independent cost estimate. The initial order was for 70 Alstom Metropolis 6-car train sets: 55 to replace the T-1 fleet plus 15 to support the Scarborough extension on Line 2 and the Yonge North extension on Line 1, with the option to procure more trains from Alstom in the future.

== Former Line 3 Scarborough trains ==
All units were retired in July 2023 at the time of the line's closure.

Numbers	Year(s) built	Builder & model	Notes
3000–23, 3024–27	1982–1983, 1986	UTDC ICTS Mark I	3014 was displayed at the 1983 Canadian National Exhibition. All units have been refurbished. Refurbished cars include, since 2015, electronic side destination signs, including automated exterior audible pre-boarding route and destination announcements, along with closed-circuit television cameras and a new vinyl wrap.
ST-1	1984	Niigata Transys	Centre-cab diesel locomotive
ST-2	1984	(likely) Arva Industries	Non-motored rail maintenance car with Wajax hydraulic crane
ST-3	1984	Niigata Transys	Non-motored rail grinding truck
ST-4	1986	Schmidt & TTC	Snow-blower installed on a non-powered PCC truck
ST-5	1987	TTC	Non-motored power rail cleaner and de-icer
ST-6	1987	General Crane and Hoist	Non-motored rail grinding truck
ST-7	2002	Mercedes-Benz Unimog U 5000 short cab	Equipped with crane and Arva Industries snowblower
E291		New Holland TC 18	Tractor used to push cars where there is no traction power

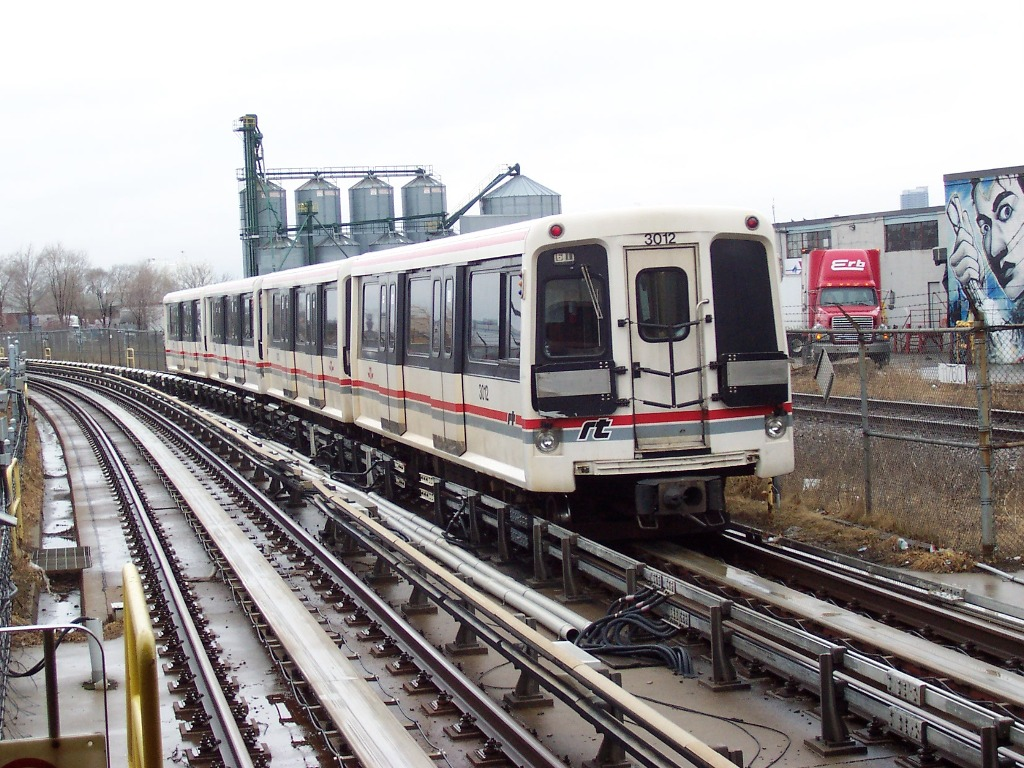
A Line 3 train in its typical four-car configuration in its original 1985–2015 livery

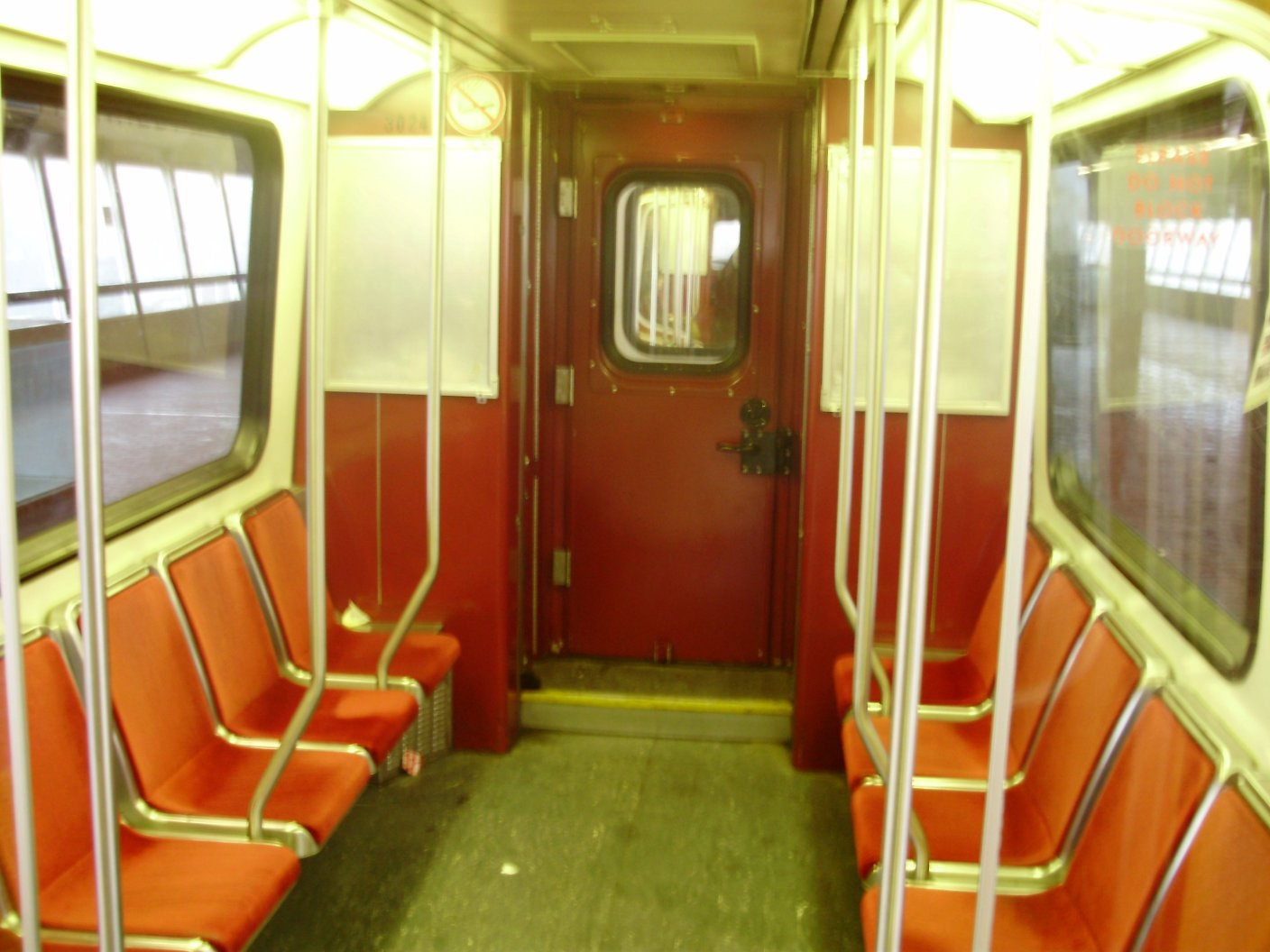
An interior view of a Line 3 train

== Work vehicles ==
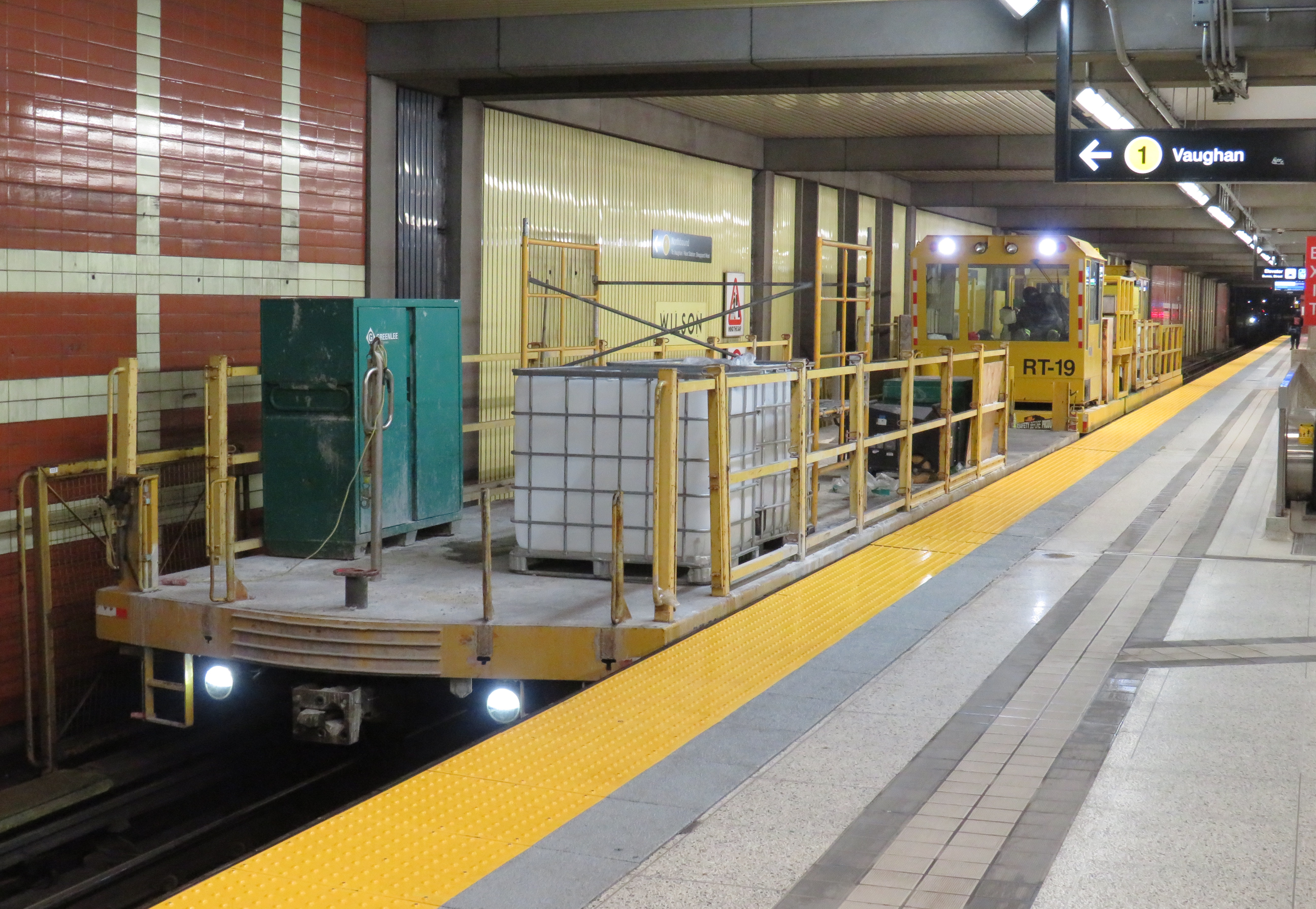
RT-19 general utility work car at Wilson station

Work vehicles are used for infrastructure maintenance within the subway. Most work vehicles are painted yellow, with the exception of retired passenger cars, which retain their natural aluminum exterior with added yellow accents.

Identifier(s)	Type	Year(s) built	Builder	Notes
RT 1, 2, 42, 47, 57, 58, 59, 70	Unpowered flatcar	1997-2005	Arva Industries	
RT 5	Tunnel leak repair	1997	Arva Industries	
RT 6, 46, 56, 84	Drain vacuum	1997-2011	Arva Industries	
RT 7	Diesel locomotive	1998	Plasser American	
RT 8	Unpowered rail delivery system	1997	Plasser American	Consists of 13 articulated bogies
RT 9/10, 30/31, 32/33, 38/39, 60/61, 62/63, 64/65, 66/67, 68/69	Structure maintenance & tunnel liner rehab		Hawker Siddeley Canada, Arva Industries	Even numbered cars are retired H-4 subway cars. Odd numbered cars are powered flatcars.
RT 11	Unpowered crane car	2000	Arva Industries	
RT 13/14/15, 34/35/36	Asbestos removal consist		Arva Industries	RT 13/14 and 34/35 are retired H series subway cars. RT 13 and 36 are powered flatcars.
RT 16, 17	Tunnel washer	1996	Arva Industries	Nicknamed The Clean Machine and Krystal Klean respectively
RT 18	Diesel locomotive	1977	Anabel Corporation of Houston, Texas	
RT 19	General utility		Arva Industries	
RT 20	Diesel crane car		Arva Industries	
RT 21, RT 41	Diesel tie tamper	1993	Plasser American	
RT 25, 73	ATC installation	1973	Nippon Sharyo	
RT 27	Unpowered beam replacement crane for maintenance of the Prince Edward Viaduct	1986	TTC	Non-motored trucks reused from a 1953–1954 G series Gloucester car
RT 28, 55	Crane car	2000	Arva Industries	
RT 29	Tunnel liner rehab	2001	Arva Industries	Painted a warmer shade of yellow than the rest of the fleet
RT 40	Non-motored ballast spreader	1989	Dynex	
RT 48, 49	Snow thrower/utility	2001	Arva Industries	
RT 50-53	Unpowered snow thrower	1999	Arva Industries	
RT 71	Tri-Mode locomotive	2006	Arva Industries	
RT 72, 76	Overhead maintenance & ATC installation			
RT 77-80	Ballast buggy		Arva Industries	Used alongside RT 40
RT 81	Anchor bolt drilling			
RT 82, 83	Crane car		Arva Industries	
RT 85	Structure rehab, leak repair, track welding	2013	Arva Industries	
RT 87, 88	Crane car		Arva Industries	
RT 89	Track vacuum car	2017	Arva Industries	
RT 90/91	Track inspection vehicle	1996-2001	Bombardier Transportation	T-1 subway cars retired from regular service following a 2008 crash at Wilson Yard, converted to work cars in 2018

== Track gauge ==
The Toronto Transit Commission uses two different track gauges:

- 4 ft 8 1/2 in (1,435 mm) standard gauge – Line 5 Eglinton, Line 6 Finch West, and the former Line 3 Scarborough
- 4 ft 10 7/8 in (1,495 mm) Toronto gauge – subway and streetcar
