= M series (Toronto subway) =

Canadian subway car

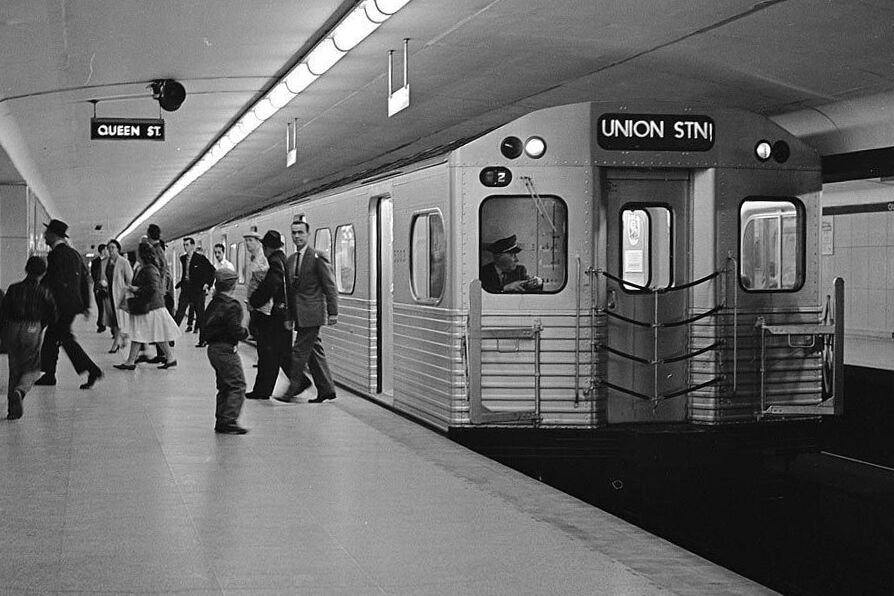
- An M-series train at Queen station in 1962
- In service: 1963–1999
- Manufacturer: Montreal Locomotive Works
- Built at: Montreal, Quebec
- Constructed: 1961–1962
- Entered service: September 30, 1962
- Retired: May 3, 1999
- Number built: 36
- Number preserved: 2 (Note: Owned by Halton County Radial Railway, a private museum)
- Number scrapped: 34
- Predecessor: G-1
- Successor: H-1
- Formation: 2 car mated pairs (operated as 3 pair (6 car) trains)
- Fleet numbers: 5300–5335
- Capacity: 83 (formerly 84) seated
- Operator: Toronto Transit Commission
- Lines served: Yonge–University; Bloor–Danforth

Specifications
- Car body construction: Aluminum
- Car length: 23.012 m (75 ft 6.0 in)
- Width: 3.14 m (10 ft 4 in)
- Height: 3.65 m (12 ft 0 in)
- Floor height: 1.1 m (3 ft 7 in)
- Doors: 8 (4 per side) per car
- Maximum speed: 89 km/h (55 mph)
- Weight: 27,215 kg (60,000 lb)
- Traction motors: DC
- Power output: 120 hp (89 kW)
- Auxiliaries: None (?)
- Electric systems: Third rail, 600 V DC
- Current collection: Contact shoe
- Braking systems: Westinghouse Brake & Signal Co. digital electro-pneumatic braking and Electro-dynamic reheostatic service brake
- Track gauge: 4 ft 10 7/8 in (1,495 mm)

The M series, also known as M-1, was the second series of rapid transit rolling stock used in the subway system of Toronto, Ontario, Canada. They were built by Montreal Locomotive Works in Montreal, Quebec, Canada, from 1961 to 1962. They were the first Toronto subway cars to be manufactured in Canada, and only one of two series built outside Ontario.

== History ==
By 1960, the Toronto Transit Commission was preparing to expand its subway system to include the University branch of Line 1. The TTC wanted subway cars with a larger 23-metre (75 ft) design and also wished to expand upon some of the experimental features in the existing G-series cars. The new design was pushed forward by general manager John G. Inglis.

A total of only 36 M-series cars were built. As the subway expanded and more trains were necessary, the TTC turned to Hawker Siddeley to build the next series of Toronto subway cars, the H series.

=== Design ===
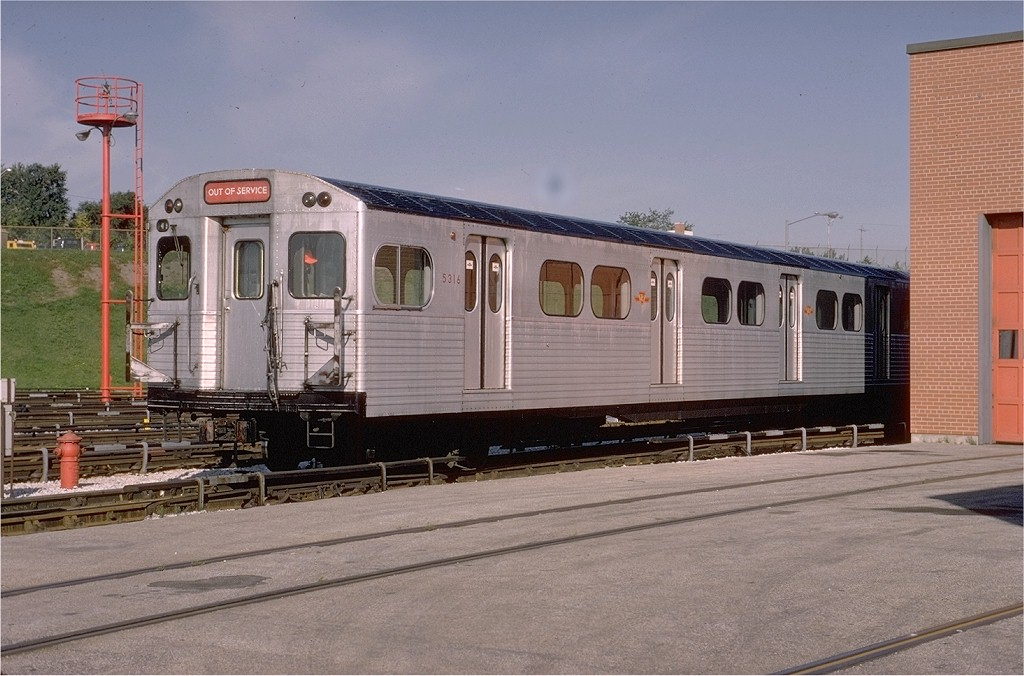
An M-series train at the Greenwood Subway Yard

The TTC performed testing at St. Clair station and Union station with a 23-metre (75 ft) test vehicle known as the "Duncan Dragon". Built at the Duncan Shops by Leonard Bardsley and the D&D Equipment Company, the test car consisted of two trucks with three panels and was designed to test the size of train that could successfully navigate the tunnels. A steel girder with railings allowed workers to walk and ride the car during tests.

After specifications for the new cars were finalized, Alco's Montreal Locomotive Works was contracted to build the new cars, dubbed M-1. The cars are historically notable as the first subway cars produced in Canada and, at the time of their construction, the longest subway cars in the world. All subsequent TTC cars have followed the size and length specifications of the M series (though the Toronto Rocket deviates from the two-car married-pair formation) and influenced several other transit authorities to examine the use of longer cars.

=== Retirement ===
The M-1 trains were decommissioned on May 1, 1999, and scrapped soon afterwards. All were scrapped except cars 5300 & 5301, which were given to the Halton County Radial Railway museum for preservation.

== See also ==
- Clearance car, special car to check for obstructions
- Toronto subway rolling stock
