= T series (Toronto subway) =

Rapid transit rolling stock in Toronto since 1995

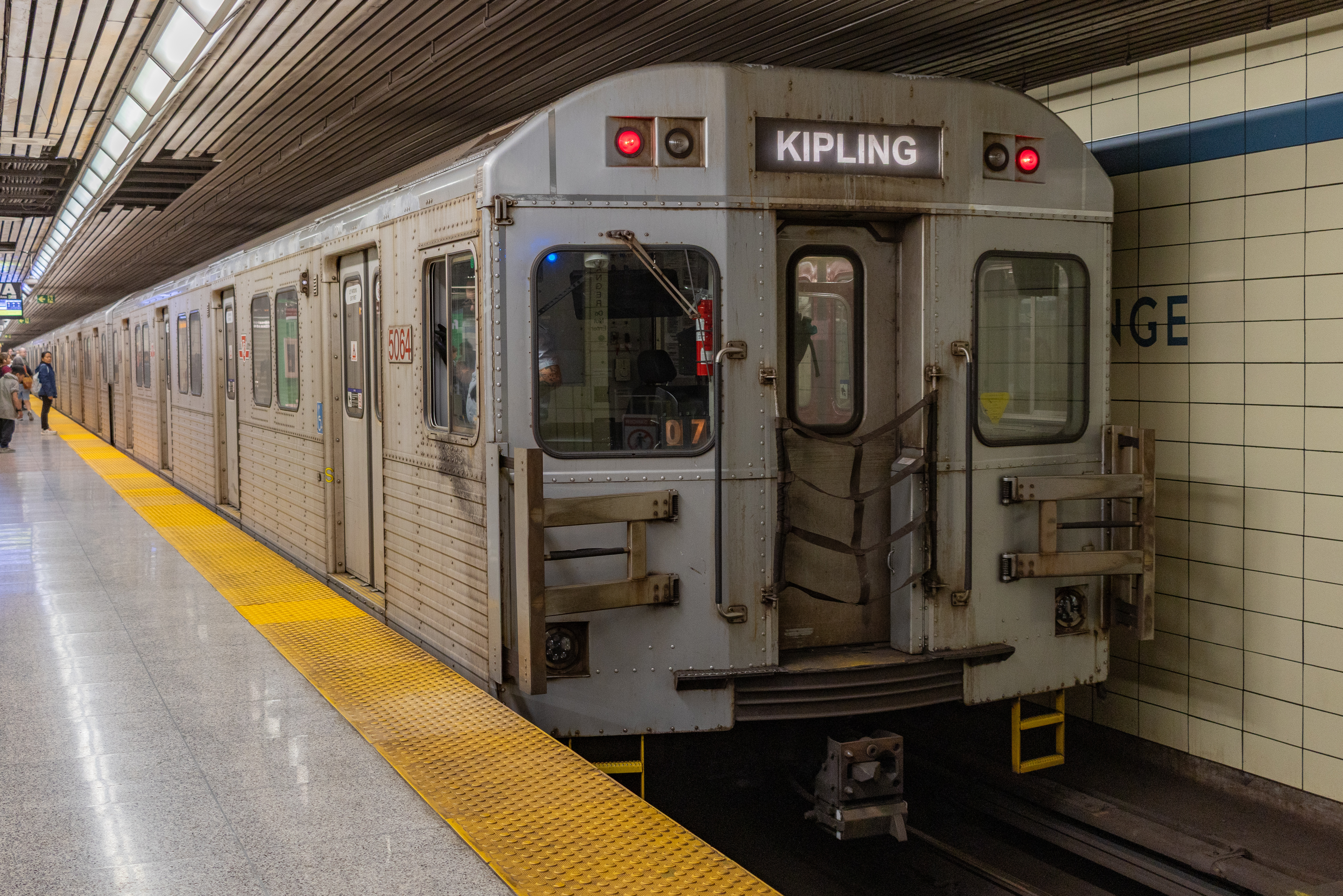
- A T-1 subway car at Bloor–Yonge station

- The interior of a T-1 subway car
- In service: 1996–present
- Manufacturer: Bombardier Transportation
- Built at: Thunder Bay, Ontario
- Replaced: M-1, H-1, H-2
- Constructed: 1995–2001
- Number built: 372
- Number in service: 370
- Number scrapped: 2
- Formation: 2 car mated pairs, operated as 2- or 3-pair (4- or 6-car) trains
- Fleet numbers: 5000–5371 (re-used from retired TTC vehicles, G-series, M-1, H-1 subway trains)
- Capacity: 66 seated (per car)
- Operator: Toronto Transit Commission
- Depot: Greenwood Yard
- Line served: Bloor–Danforth

Specifications
- Car body construction: Aluminum
- Car length: 23 m (75 ft 5 1/2 in)
- Width: 3.14 m (10 ft 3 5/8 in)
- Height: 3.65 m (11 ft 11 3/4 in)
- Floor height: 1.1 m (43.3 in)
- Doors: 8 sets (4 sets per side) per car
- Maximum speed: Train max: 88 km/h (55 mph); Service revenue max: 75 km/h (47 mph)
- Weight: 33,095 kg (72,962 lb)
- Traction system: GTO-VVVF (Adtranz/Westinghouse)
- Traction motors: Adtranz 1507A 104.2 kW (139.7 hp) 3-phase AC synchronous motors
- Power output: 2,500.8 kW (3,353.6 hp)
- Acceleration: 0.85 m/s^{2} (2.8 ft/s^{2})
- Deceleration: 1.30 m/s^{2} (4.3 ft/s^{2}) (service); 1.38 m/s^{2} (4.5 ft/s^{2}) (emergency)
- Auxiliaries: 120/208 V AC battery auxiliary
- Electric system: 600 V DC third rail
- Current collection: Contact shoe
- Braking systems: Regenerative and Pneumatic
- Track gauge: 1,495 mm (4 ft 10 7/8 in) Toronto gauge

The T series, also known as the T-1, is the fourth series of rapid transit rolling stock used in the subway system of Toronto, Ontario, Canada. They were ordered by the Toronto Transit Commission (TTC) in 1992 and built in one production set between 1995 and 2001 by Bombardier Transportation in Thunder Bay, Ontario, Canada.

Currently based entirely out of Greenwood Yard, the T-1s are the older of the two currently active series of rolling stock on the heavy-rail lines in the Toronto subway network. Following the introduction of the newer Toronto Rocket train sets, all T-1 trains now operate exclusively in six-car configurations on Line 2 Bloor–Danforth. They previously operated on Line 1 Yonge–University and in a four-car configuration on Line 4 Sheppard until the retirement of the last remaining H-series trains in 2014 and until the implementation of one-person train operation on the latter in 2016.

== Design advances ==
The T-1 cars entered service between 1996 and 2001 and became the mainstay of the TTC subway fleet. By 1999, they had replaced the older M1s, H1s, H2s and prototype H3s, along with some H4s, many of which had been in revenue service since the 1960s.

The T-1s had many of the same technical specifications of the H series, including the same married pair configuration, and incorporated many of the design elements that had been refined throughout the H-series program. Each model in the H-series production run improved on the last, adding features such as a single-handle controller for acceleration and braking, air conditioning, a change from camshaft to chopper control, and regenerative braking. The T-1 built on those advances (such as changing from a rotary-type to a fore–aft, joystick-type controller) while integrating new computer technology (analogous to the New Technology Train of the New York City Subway), creating a more modern train. The T-series cars were the first TTC cars to use AC propulsion, rather than DC propulsion as used in all previous rolling stock, all of which are now retired.

Other improvements included wider entry and exit doorways, flip-up seats for the installation of wheelchair positions (which are now marked in blue velour to signify priority seating areas instead of the red velour used for other seats), and the removal of vertical stanchions along the car's centre line, making them the TTC's first subway cars to be wheelchair-accessible. The interior colour scheme consists of grey floors and walls and dark red doors and panels, unlike the simulated woodgrain panels used on the predecessor H-series cars.

== Lines served ==
- Line 1 Yonge–University (March 11, 1996 – May 27, 2015)
- Line 2 Bloor–Danforth (2000–present)
- Line 4 Sheppard (November 24, 2002 – October 8, 2016)

== Future ==
The T-1s have a life expectancy that allows them to remain in service until 2026. However, at the end of 2019, the TTC proposed an overhaul to extend the T-1 fleet's life by 10 years.

The TTC also considered upgrading the fleet to run on an automatic train control (ATC) system, which it is in the process of installing to replace the current wayside signalling system on Lines 1 and 4 and is expected to install on Line 2 by 2030 in conjunction with the opening of the Scarborough subway extension. However, due to prohibitively expensive costs of such a retrofit, it is unlikely that this will happen in the near future, and the TTC plans to replace all T-1 trains with new ATC-compatible equipment instead.

In October 2022, the TTC had issued a request for proposals for new Line 2 trains similar to the Toronto Rockets, which would have replaced the T-1s. Later in June 2023, due to a lack of funding, the order was cancelled.

In November 2023, the province promised to contribute $758 million for the purchase of 55 new subway trains to replace Line 2's T-1 fleet, provided that the federal government and the city each made a matching contribution. In November 2024, the federal government announced it would also contribute $758 million.

In total, the new fleet of 55 trains would cost $2.3 billion. In late 2024, the TTC expected delivery of the new trains to start in 2030. The TTC budgeted $163 million to keep the old T-1 fleet operational until it is fully replaced. On August 15, 2025, it was announced that the new trains will be built at the Alstom Thunder Bay plant in a single-sourced contract to keep most of the work in Canada. The order will be for 70 trains: 55 to replace the T-1 fleet plus 15 to support the Scarborough extension on Line 2 and the Yonge North extension on Line 1.

== Gallery ==
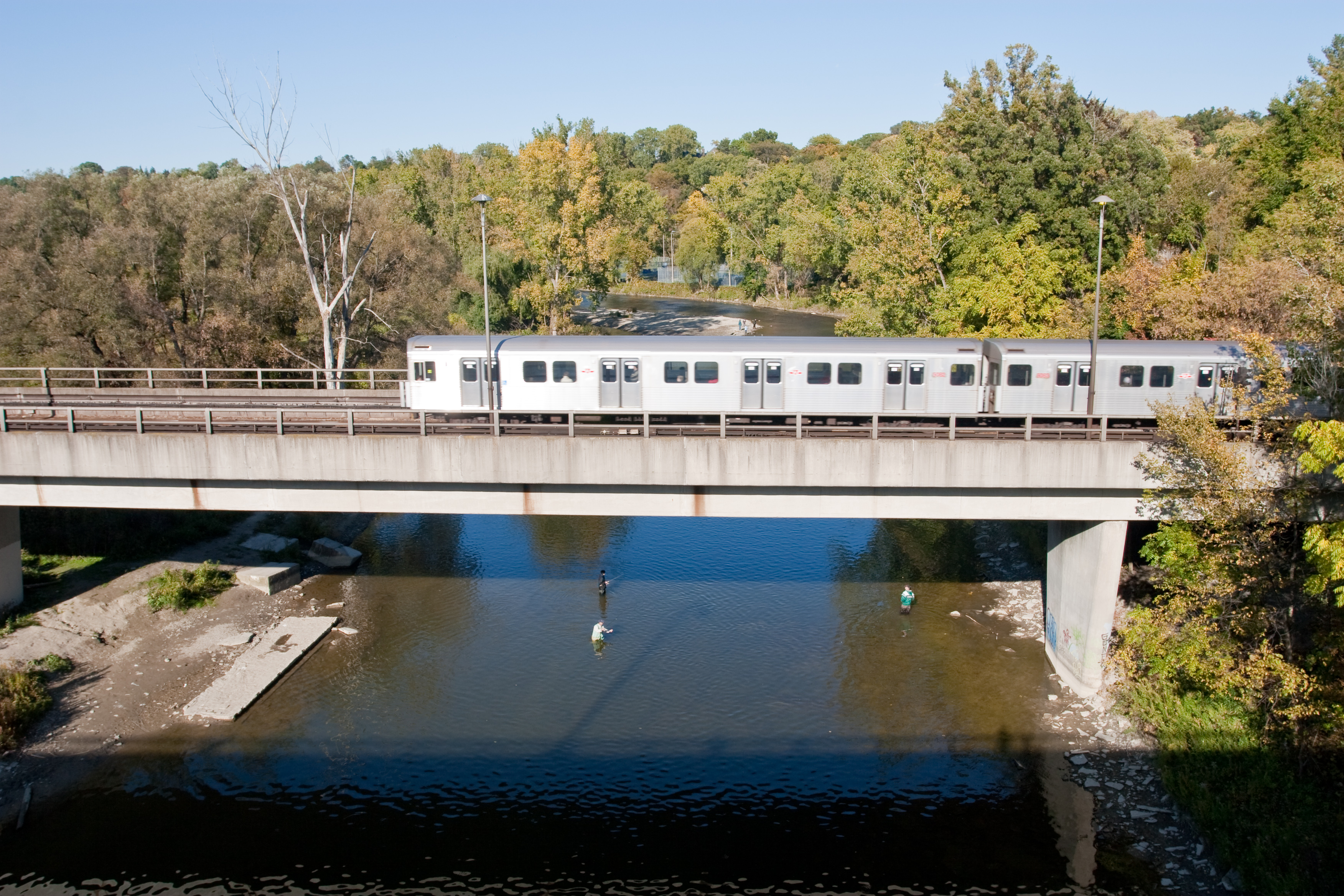
A T-1 crosses the bridge over the Humber River on its way west to Old Mill station

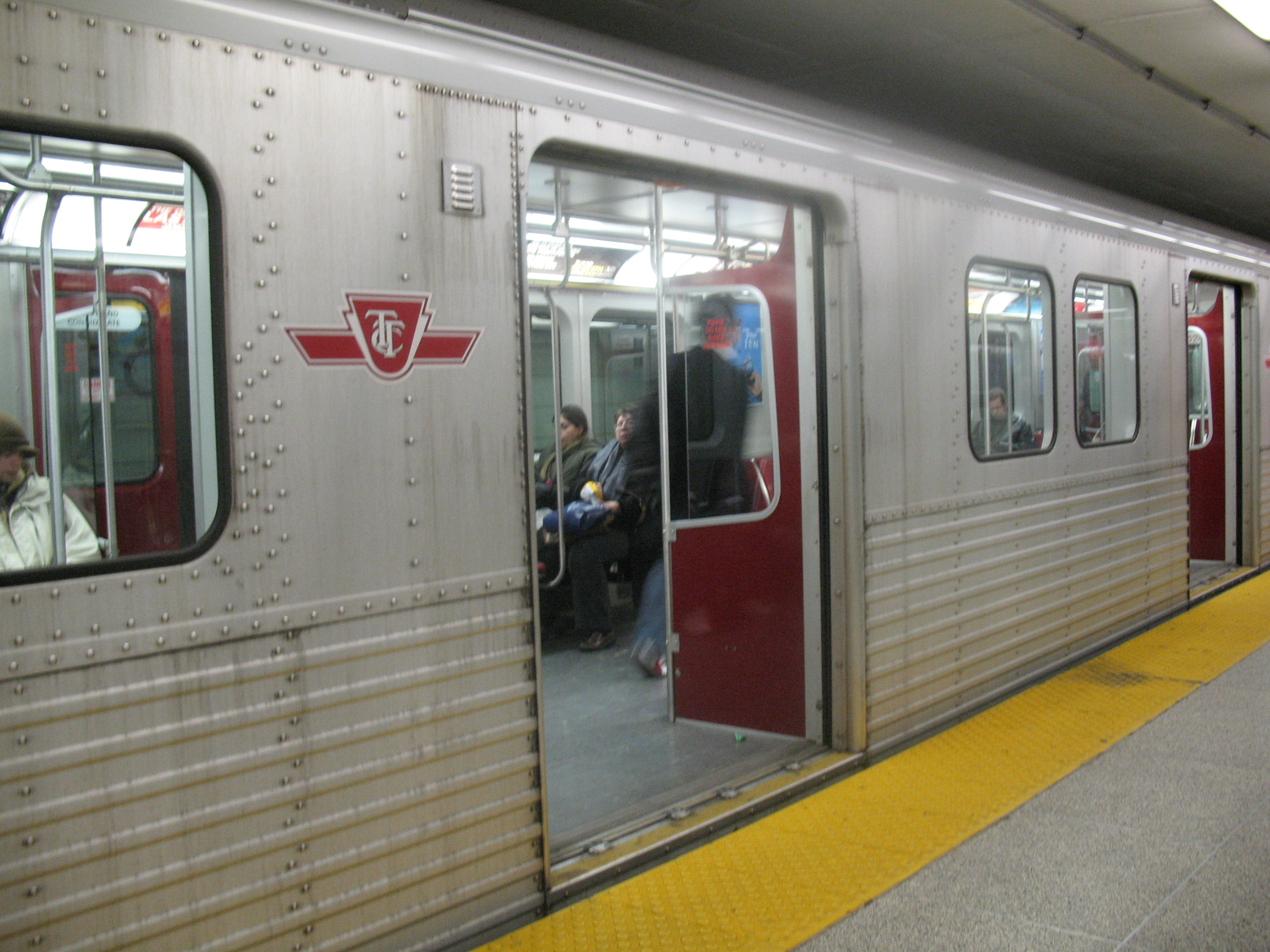
The T-1s feature wider doors than their predecessors.

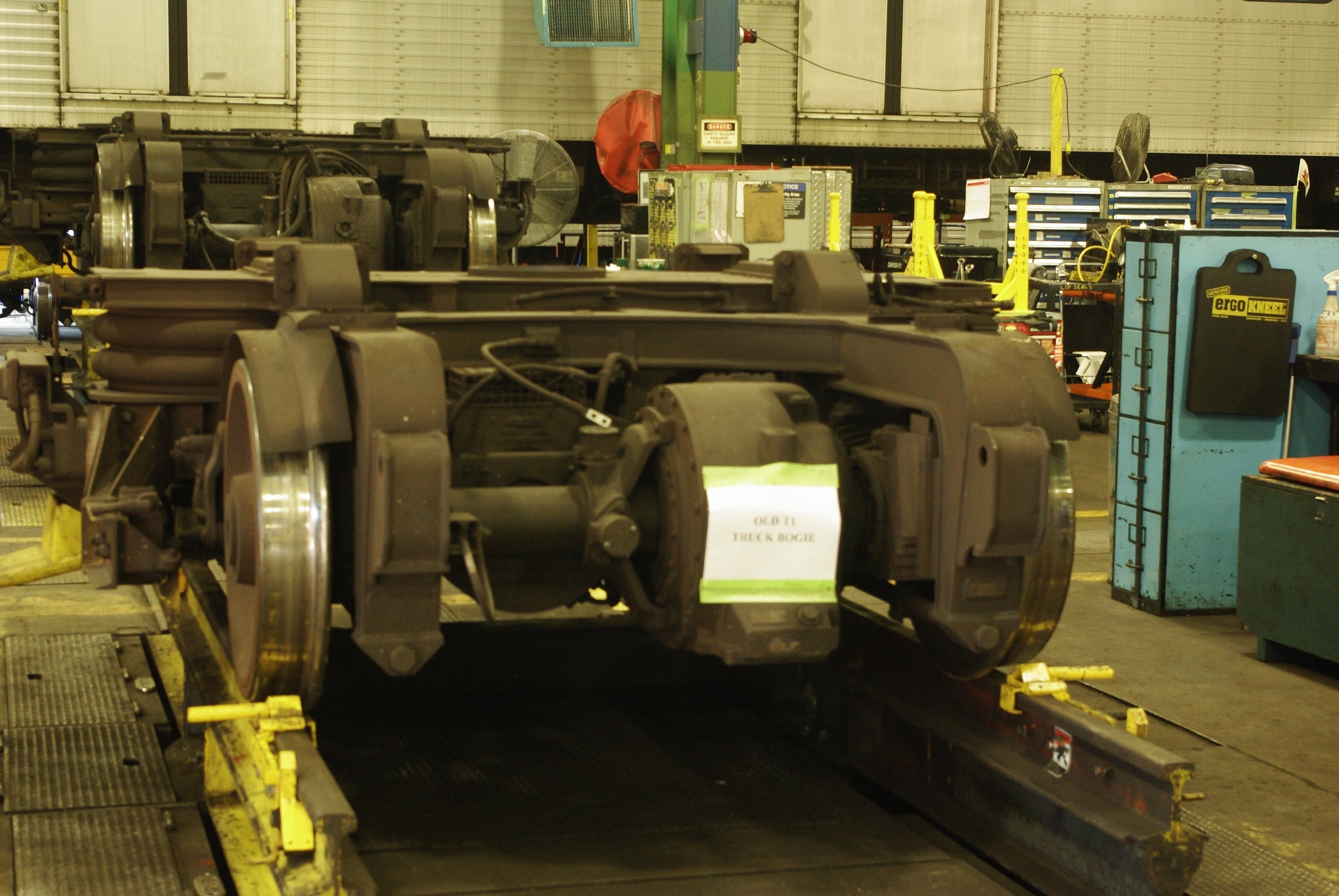
An old T-1 Bogie at Greenwood Yard

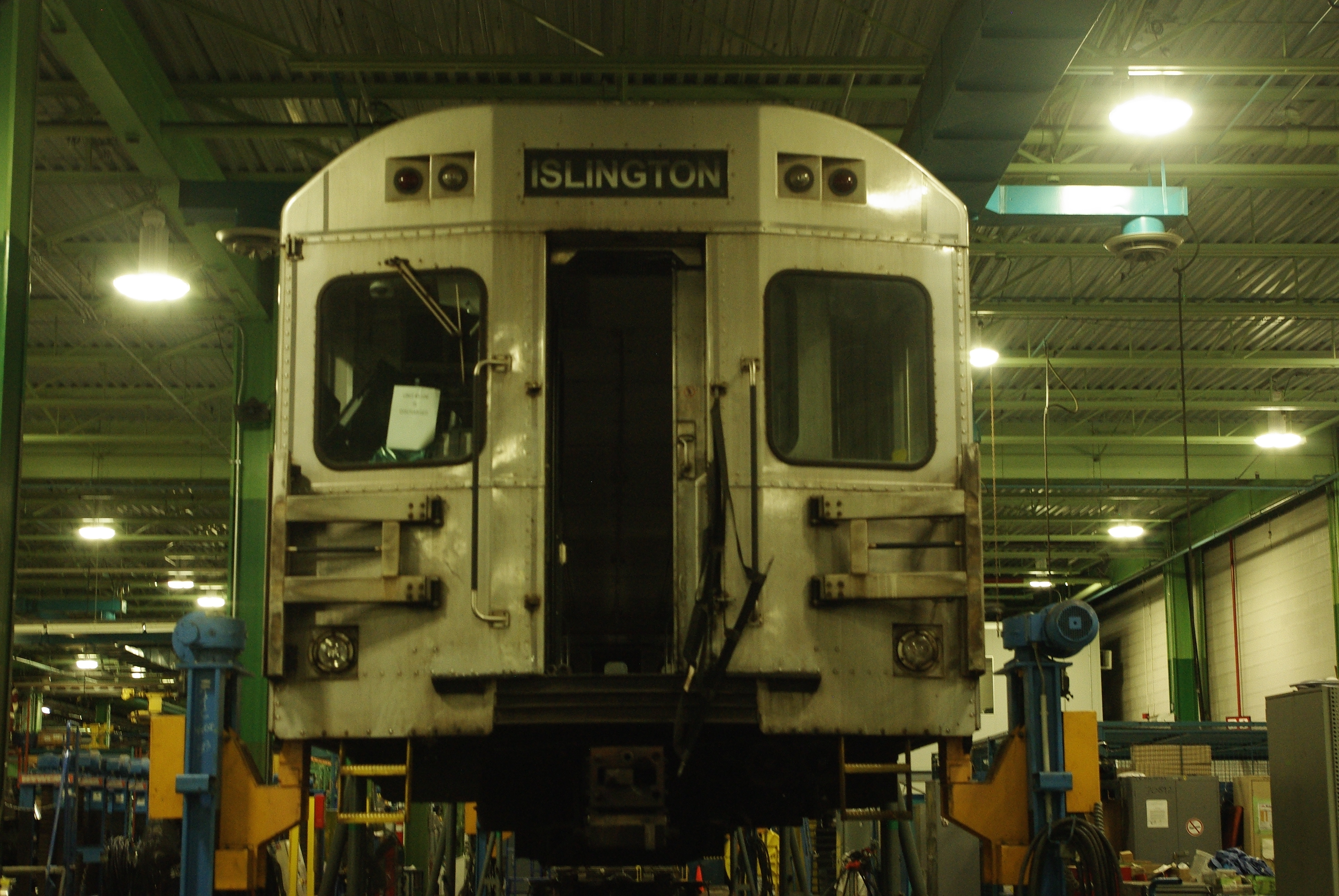
A T-1 in the shops at Greenwood Yard
