= Tempo (railcar) =

Type of Canadian railcar

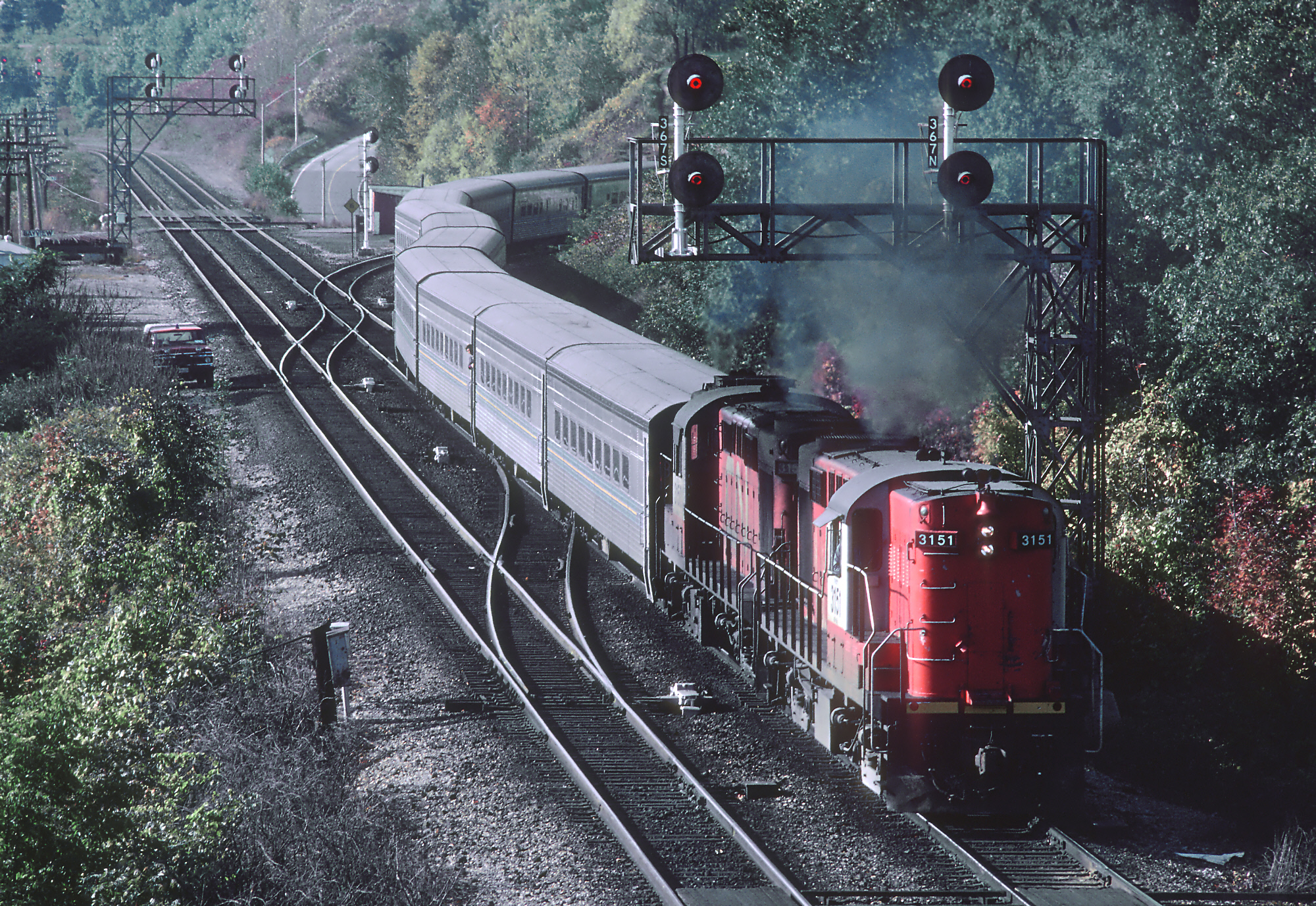
- Tempo cars in Via Rail service, 1981
- In service: 1968–present
- Manufacturer: Hawker Siddeley Canada
- Number built: 25
- Operators: Canadian National Railway; Via Rail; Ski Train; QIT-Fer et Titane; Algoma Central Railway

Specifications
- Car body construction: Aluminum
- Power supply: 480 or 550 V HEP
- Braking system: Outboard disc brakes
- Track gauge: 4 ft 8 1/2 in (1,435 mm)

The Tempos are a fleet of 25 lightweight streamlined railway coaches built by Hawker Siddeley Canada for the Canadian National Railway in 1968. The cars were the centrepiece of a new set of intercity passenger trains in Southwestern Ontario. The fleet passed to Via Rail in 1978 and later saw use with the Ski Train, QIT-Fer et Titane, and the Algoma Central Railway.

== Design ==
The cars were constructed out of aluminum. Canadian National rebuilt six MLW RS-18 diesel locomotives to haul them. The locomotives were equipped with head end power (HEP) and painted in a unique red-orange and grey livery. The cars were built to use Canadian National's standard 575 volt HEP; in 1982-83 Via rebuilt them to use 480 volts. The cars rode on "inside bearing trucks with outboard disc brakes."

The original fleet consisted of five club/galley cars, five coach/cafe cars, and fifteen coaches. The club cars seated 39, the cafes 16 (in the coach section), and the coaches 80. In 1969 Canadian National rebuilt one of the club cars into an 80-seat coach and another into a 52-seat coach/galley car. The seating in the club car was 2×1, common for parlor cars.

When the Canadian National reacquired part of the fleet in 2009 it refurbished the cars, replacing the windows, carpet, and seat upholstery.

== Service ==
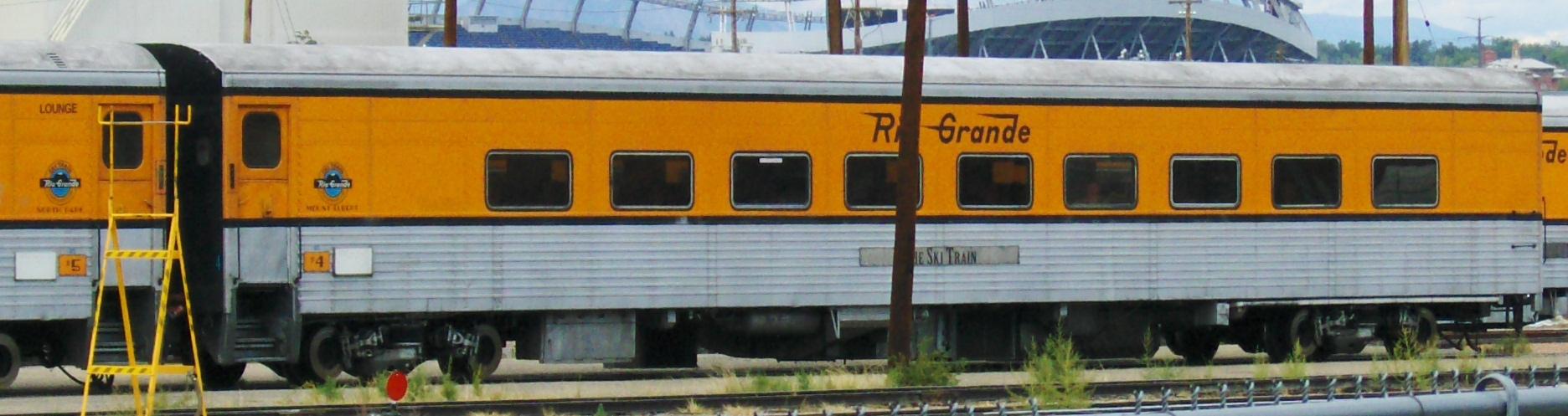
Tempo cars in Ski Train service, 2008

The Tempos entered service on the Canadian National Railway in mid-June 1968. Canadian National operated the Tempos as integrated trainsets. Routes served included Toronto–Windsor and Toronto–Sarnia. At the outset each set comprised a club/galley car, three coaches, and a coach/cafe. Travel time was four hours. The cafe/coach and the addition of luggage racks in the coaches allowed the elimination of dining and baggage cars. In 1971 Canadian National ran five daily "Tempo" trains: four to Windsor and one to Sarnia. Via Rail inherited the fleet and leased the RS-18s. By 1980 the Tempos were limited to the Windsor route. Via later placed the Tempos in service on the Chicago–Toronto International. These were pulled by LRC locomotives.

Via Rail stored the five cafe cars in 1986 after a regulatory change permitted it to serve alcohol in coaches. In 1987 Via Rail included up to four Tempo coaches on the International. The cars ran between Toronto and Sarnia on Sundays only. The remainder of the fleet was stored. At the end of 1987 Via sold all but four of the cars. Four of the coaches went to QIT-Fer et Titane, which used them to shuttle workers. 17 cars, including the three remaining club/galleys, the coach/galley, the five coach/cafes, and eight coaches, went to the Ski Train in Denver. On the Ski Train they replaced 1915-vintage cars which had been sold to the Napa Valley Wine Train. Via withdrew its four remaining Tempos in 1990 because of budget cuts.

QIT acquired three more coaches in 1998. The sole remaining Via Tempo car, coach No. 370, was reported at the Toronto Maintenance Centre in 2000. After the closure of the Ski Train the Canadian National acquired its rolling stock for use on the Algoma Central Railway.
