= Halton County Radial Railway =

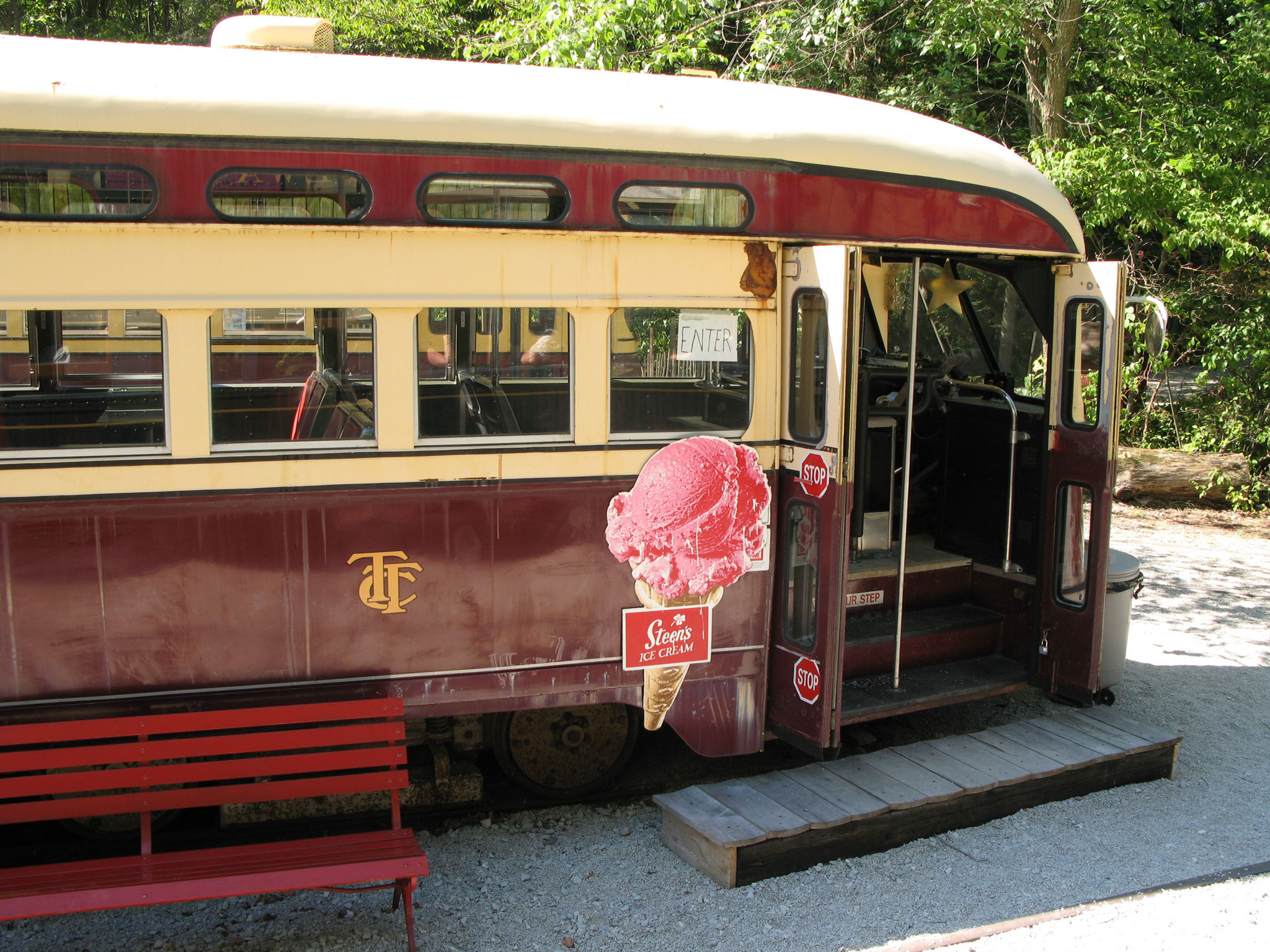
- A former TTC streetcar (PCC A-15 #4618) at the museum, now serving as an ice-cream shop.
- Established: December 1953; 72 years ago
- Location: 13629 Guelph Line, Milton, Ontario, Canada
- Coordinates: 43.57962°N 80.11337°W
- Type: Railway museum / Heritage railway
- Website: https://www.hcry.org

The Halton County Radial Railway is a working museum of electric streetcars, other railway vehicles, buses and trolleybuses. It is operated by the Ontario Electric Railway Historical Association (OERHA). It is focused primarily on the history of the Toronto Transit Commission (TTC) and its predecessor, the Toronto Transportation Commission, Its collection includes PCC, Peter Witt, CLRV and ALRV, and earlier cars from the Toronto streetcar system as well as G-series and M-series Toronto subway cars.

The museum is open to the public, with rides on many of its vehicles. It is located between the villages of Rockwood and Campbellville in Milton, Ontario, Canada, along part of the Toronto Suburban Railway's former right-of-way. The tracks conform to the TTC's track gauge of 4 ft 10 7/8 in (1,495 mm), which is 60 mm (2 3/8 in) wider than 1,435 mm (4 ft 8 1/2 in) standard gauge. Vehicles from other systems must be altered to accommodate the tracks, and cars intended for third-rail power must be reconfigured for use with overhead wire. In 1889, electric railway service on routes radiating from Toronto, Ontario began. An Ontario Historical Plaque was erected at the Halton County Radial Railway Museum by the province to commemorate the Radial Railways' role in Ontario's heritage. Museum Peter Witt streetcars can be seen in the 2005 film Cinderella Man on the streets of Toronto to give it a 1930s New York City appearance.

== History ==
The Halton County Radial Railway and the OERHA was formed in 1953 by a group of men who wanted to save Toronto Transit Commission streetcar 1326 from being sent to the scrap yard. After the donation of this streetcar, the dream grew. Land that used to be a part of the Toronto Suburban Railway in Nassagaweya Township was acquired, and subsequently, a number of other street and radial cars were eventually rescued. The museum's grand opening took place in 1972.

Since the beginning, the vision of the HCRR was to inform, educate and inspire the public about the electric railway history of Ontario and Canada. Today, the museum displays and operates a variety of historic streetcars, radial cars and work cars, and maintains a collection of photographs, memorabilia and archival materials. The oldest rail car in the collection dates from the late 1800s.

== Gallery ==
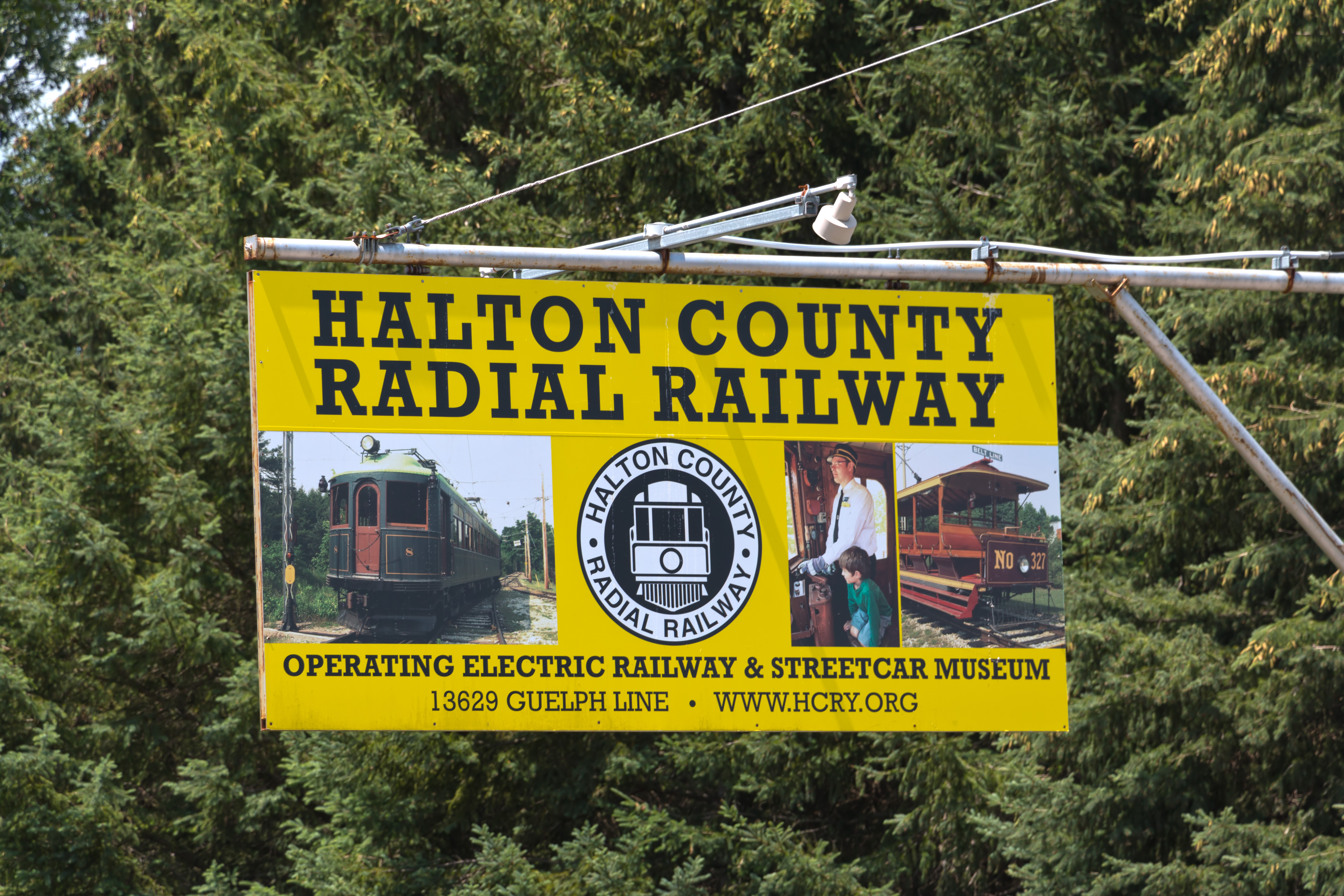
Entrance sign located on Guelph Line in Milton, Ontario

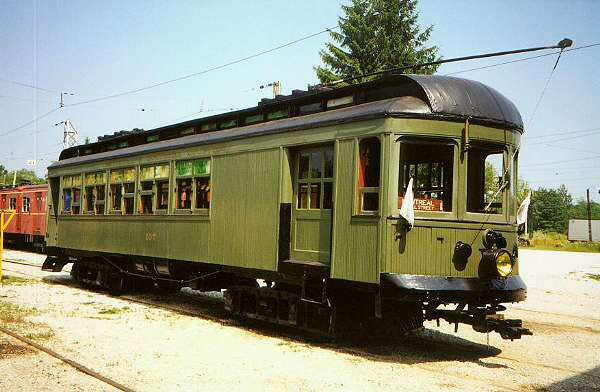
Montreal & Southern Counties 107 (built by Ottawa Car Company)

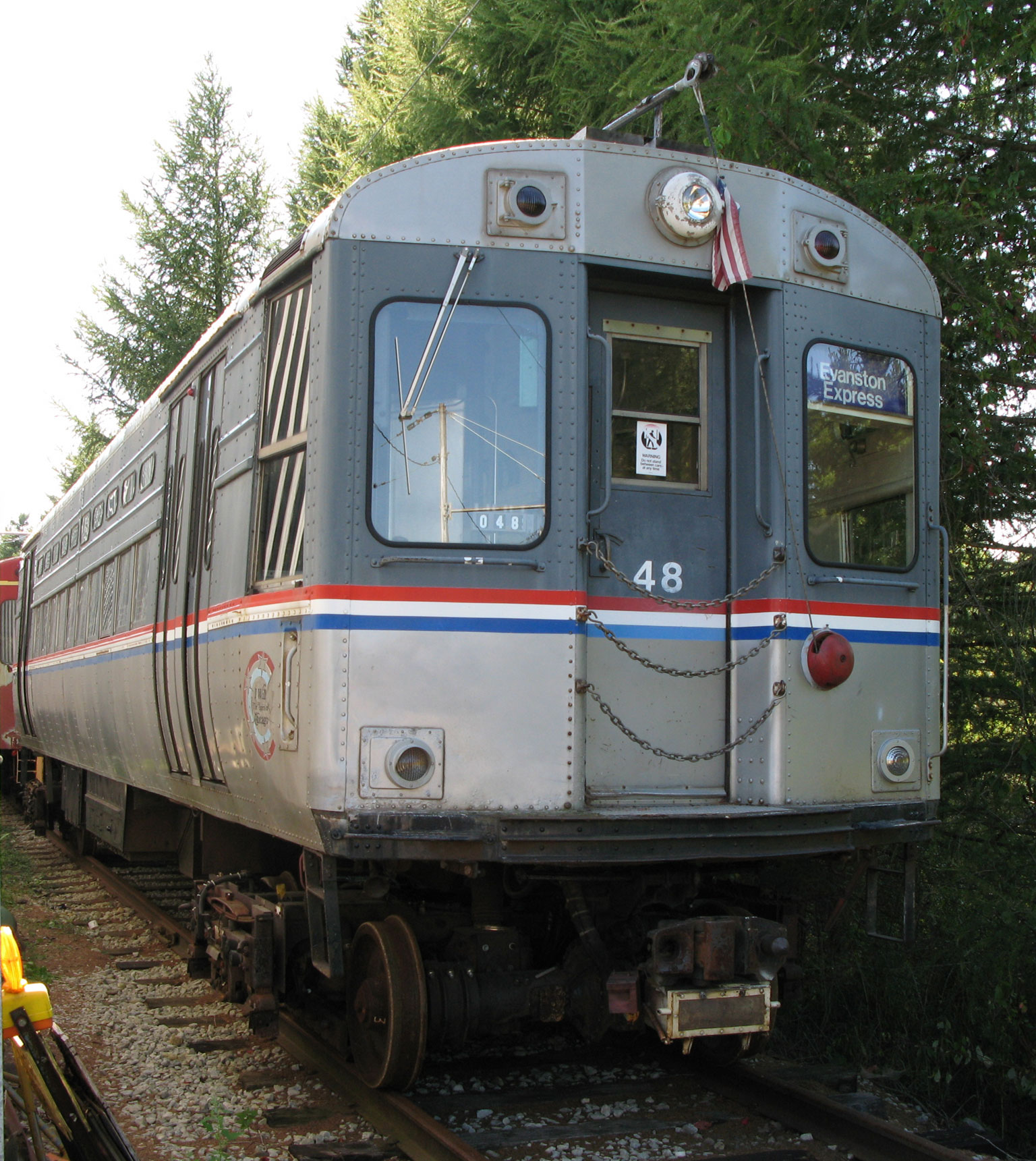
St. Louis Car Company-built 1-50 series train of the Chicago "L", originally considered for the Toronto subway

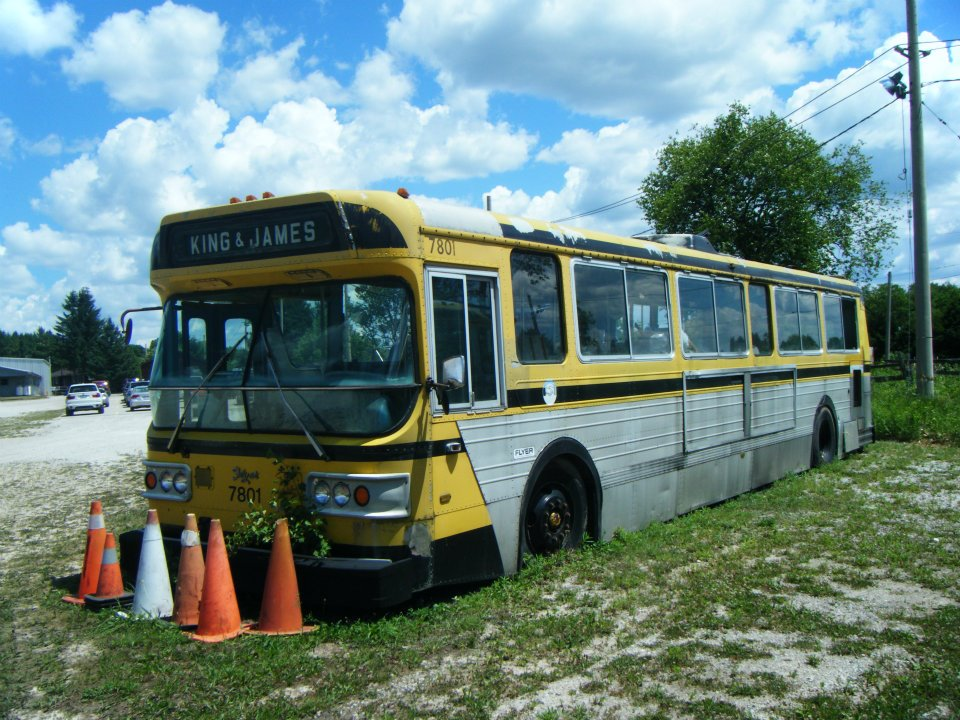
Flyer Industries E800A trolleybus used on the Hamilton trolleybus system

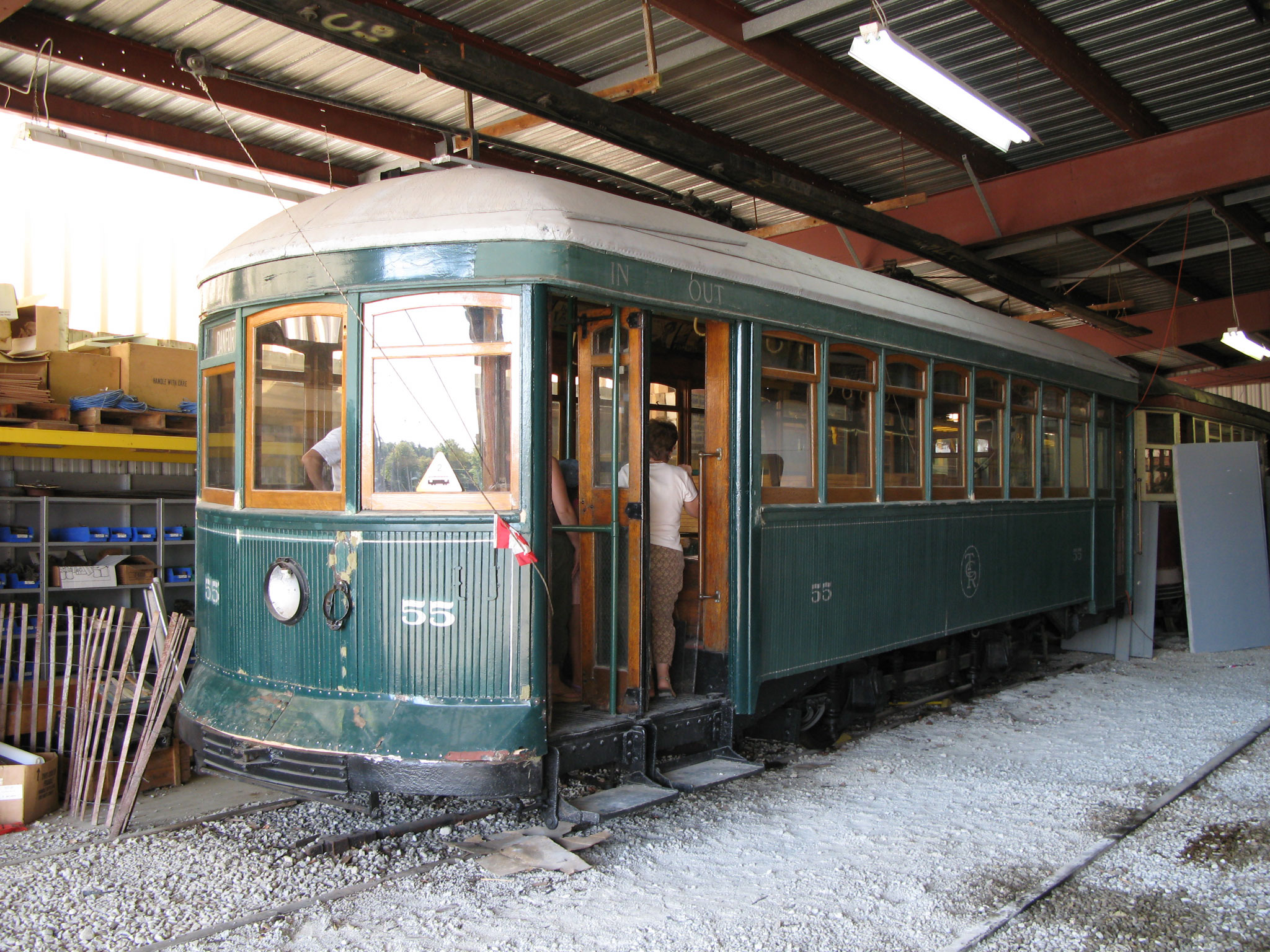
Toronto Civic Railways 55 is one of the few surviving Preston Car Company-built cars

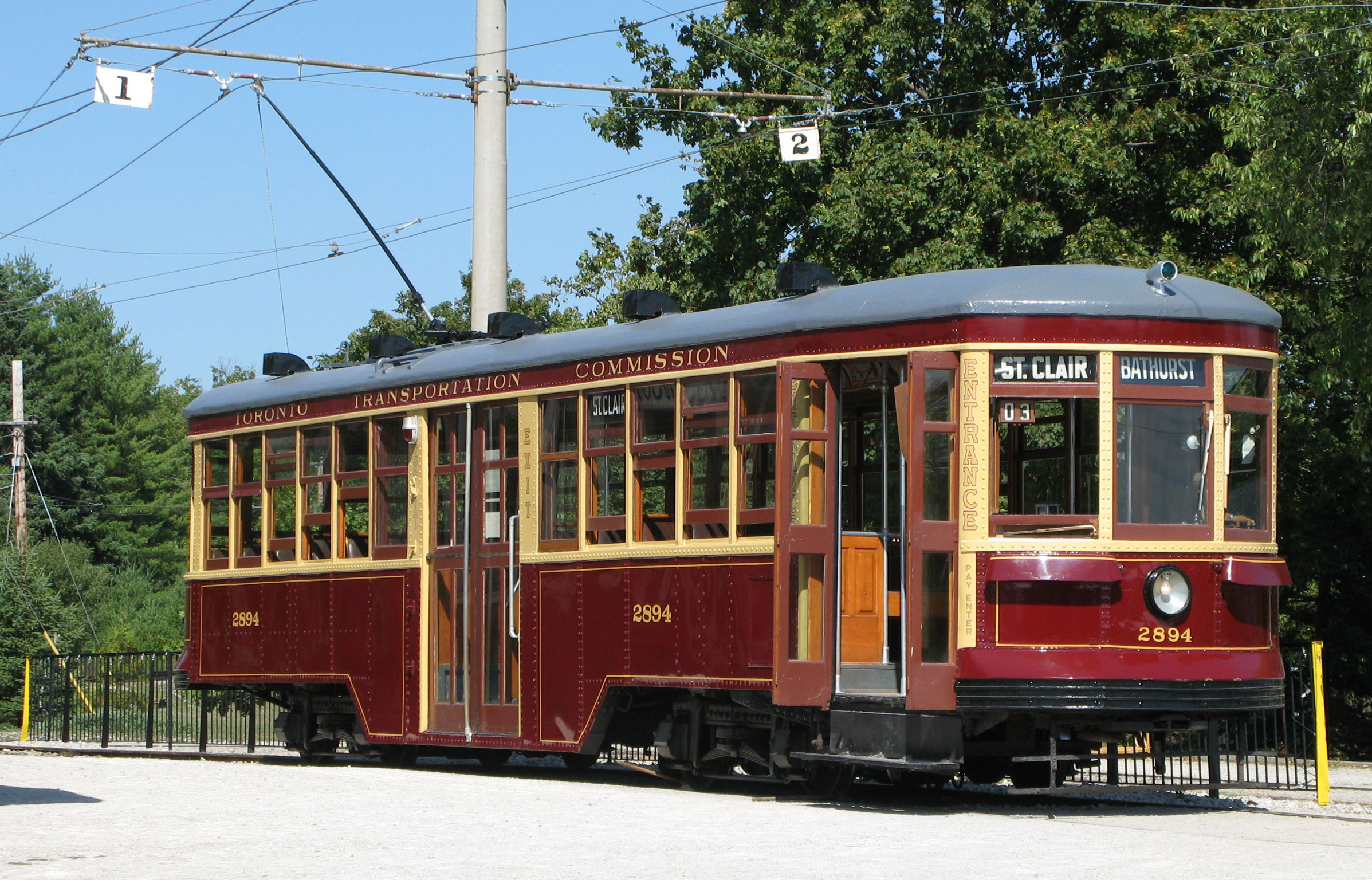
This Canadian Car & Foundry Peter Witt streetcar 2894 restored into the TTC’s original 1921 livery

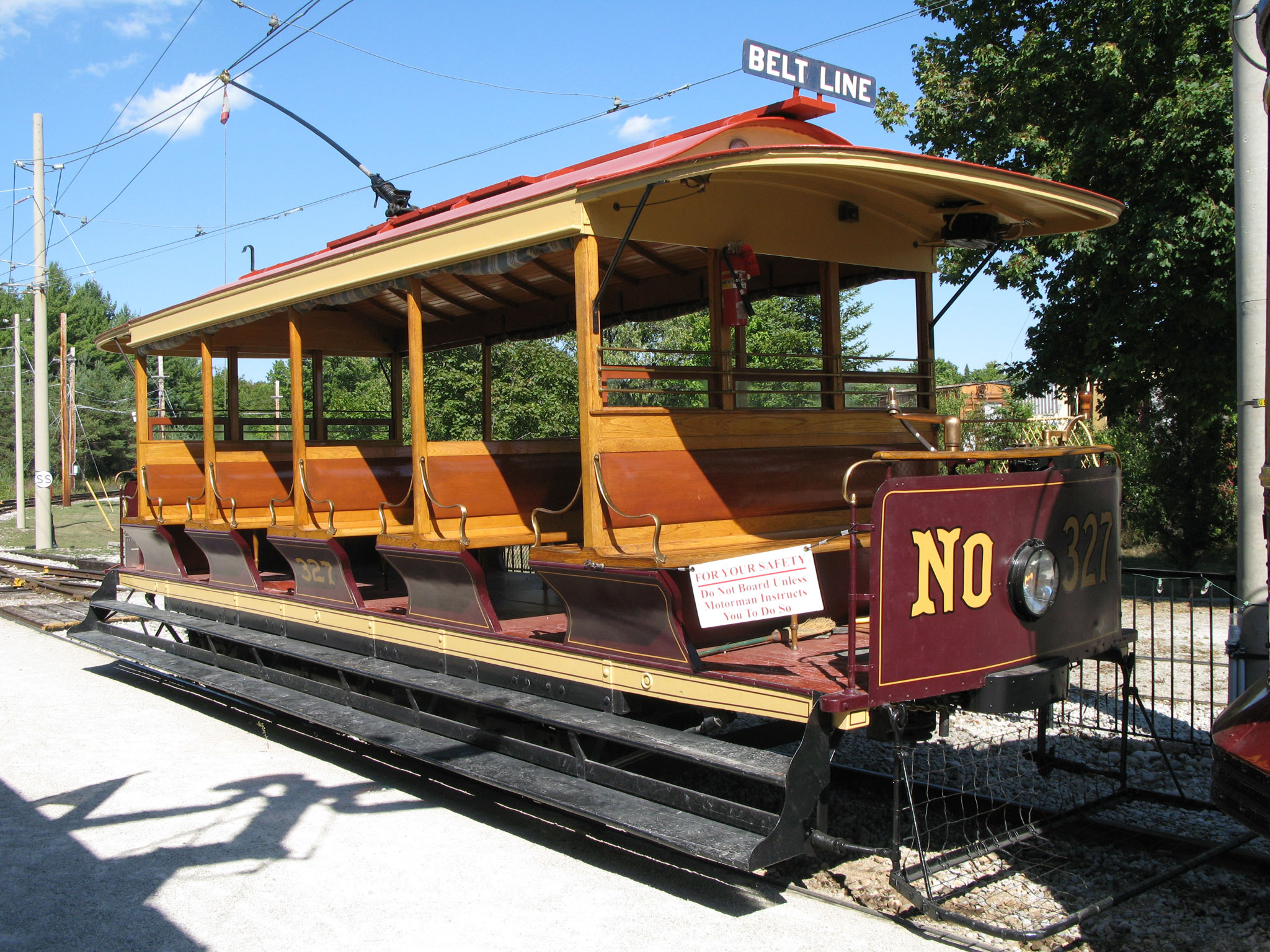
Car 327 is a 1930s replica (built by Toronto Transportation Commission) of the original 1890s Toronto Railway Company vehicle

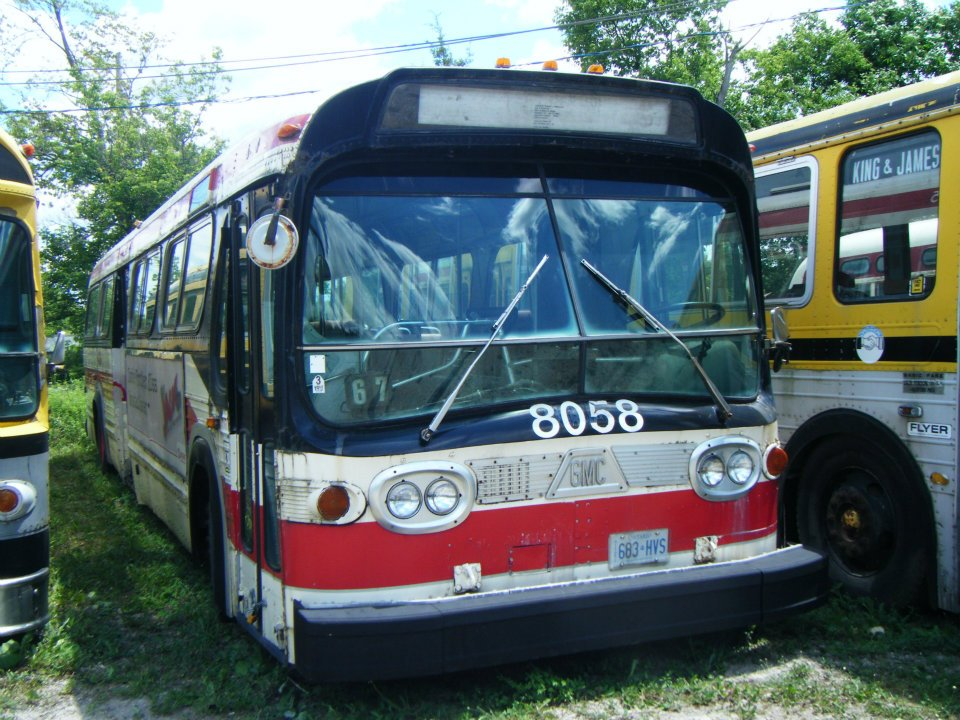
1975 GM New Look bus T6H 5307N #8058 from the TTC

== TTC Collection ==
- TTC CLRV streetcars 4003 (built by SIG), 4010, 4039, 4040, 4053 and 4178; acquired 2019–2020.
- TTC ALRV streetcar 4204; acquired 2019 and one of two last ALRV operating in 2019
- TTC G1 subway cars 5098 and 5099
- TTC MLW M1 subway cars 5300 and 5301
- TTC CCF-built Peter Witt streetcar 2894, 2424 and 2786, 2984
- TTC PCC streetcars CCF-built 4000 (A1), 4386 (A6), 4426 (A7), 4600 (A8 / A15), 4611 and 4618 (A8 / A15); 4684 is an A12 St Louis Car built ex-Louisville Railway #509 and ex-Cleveland Transit System #4259
- TTC UTDC ICTS Mark I cars 3026 and 3027

== See also ==
- Canadian Pacific Railway
- Hamilton Street Railway
- History of rail transport in Canada
- List of heritage railways in Canada
- List of museums in Canada
- Northern Ontario Railway Museum
- Toronto radial lines
- Toronto streetcar track gauge
- Toronto subway track gauge
- Toronto Transit Commission
