= H series (Toronto subway) =

Subway rolling stock in Toronto

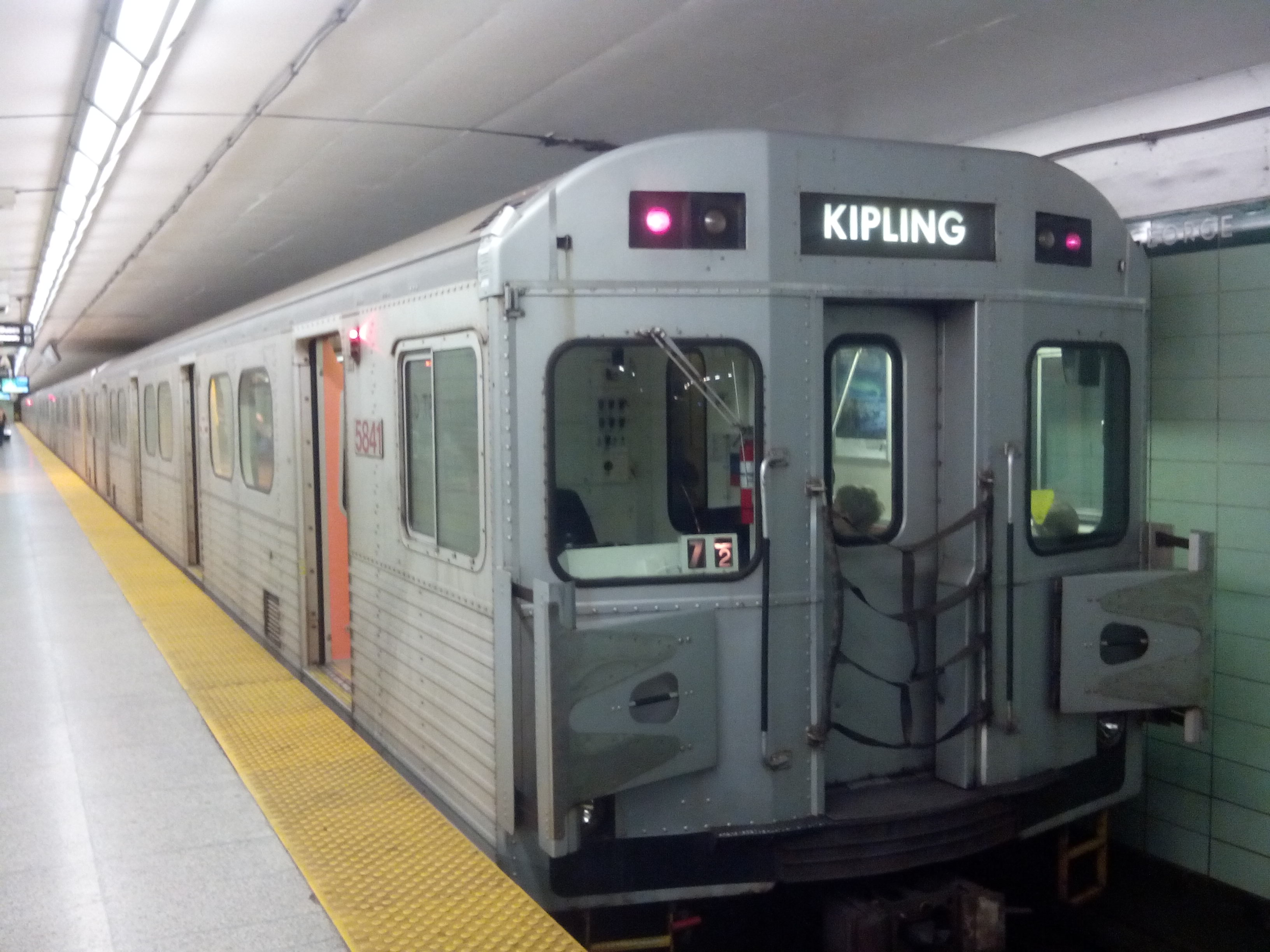
- An H-6 train at St. George station
- Stock type: Electric multiple unit
- In service: 1965–2014 (TTC); H-1: 1965–1999; H-2/H-3: 1971–2001; H-4: 1974–2012; H-5: 1976–2013; H-6 (TTC): 1986–2014; H-6 (Ankara Metro) 1997–2019
- Manufacturers: H-1, H-2, H-4, H-5: Hawker Siddeley; H-3: Hawker Siddeley, TTC; H-6 (TTC): UTDC; H-6 (Ankara Metro): Bombardier Transportation
- Built at: Thunder Bay, Ontario (H-1–H-6); Toronto, Ontario (H-3 TTC modifications)
- Replaced: G series
- Constructed: H-1: 1965–1966; H-2/H-3: 1971; H-4: 1974–1975; H-5: 1976–1979; H-6 (TTC): 1986–1989; H-6 (Ankara Metro): 1996–1998
- Entered service: H-1 July 26, 1965 (Toronto Subway); H-2 March 10, 1972 (Toronto Subway); H-4 October 1, 1974 (Toronto Subway); H-5 May 18, 1977 (Toronto Subway); H-6 May 26, 1987 (Toronto Subway); H-6 1997–1998 (Ankara Metro)
- Retired: H-1: November 29, 1999; H-2: September 28, 2001; H-4: January 27, 2012; H-5: June 14, 2013; H-6: June 20, 2014 (Toronto Subway); H-6: 2019 (Ankara Metro)
- Scrapped: H-1: 1997–1999; H-2/H-3: 2001–2002; H-4: 2001–2012; H-5: 2012–2013; H-6 (TTC): 2014–2015
- Number built: H-1: 164; H-2/H-3: 76; H-4: 88; H-5: 138; H-6 (TTC): 126; H-6 (Ankara Metro): 108
- Number scrapped: H-1: 161; H-2/H-3: 76; H-4: 80; H-5: 136; H-6 (TTC): 126
- Successor: T-1 (TTC); Toronto Rocket (TTC)
- Fleet numbers: H-1: 5336–5499; H-2/H-3: 5500–5575; H-4: 5576–5663; H-5: 5670–5807; H-6: 5810–5935 (TTC)
- Capacity: 76 seated
- Operators: Toronto Transit Commission (1965–2014); Ankara Metro (1997–2019)
- Depots: Davisville, Greenwood, Wilson
- Lines served: Yonge–University (H-1, H-2, H-5); Bloor–Danforth (H-1, H-2, H-4, H-6)

Specifications
- Car body construction: Aluminum
- Car length: 22.86 m (75 ft 0 in)
- Width: 3.14 m (10 ft 4 in)
- Height: 3.65 m (12 ft 0 in)
- Floor height: 1.1 m (3 ft 7 in)
- Doors: 8 sets (4 sets per side) per car
- Maximum speed: 88 km/h (55 mph)
- Weight: H-1: 25,630 kg (56,500 lb); H-2: 25,590 kg (56,420 lb); H-4: 26,180 kg (57,720 lb); H-5: 30,440 kg (67,110 lb); H-6: 32,660 kg (72,000 lb)
- Traction system: Camshaft Resistance control (H-1, H-2, H-4); Thyristor Chopper control (H-3, H-5, H-6)
- Power output: H-1: 121 hp (90 kW); H-2–H-4: 116 hp (87 kW); H-5: 126 hp (94 kW); H-6: 123 hp (92 kW)
- Auxiliaries: 120/208 V AC Battery Auxiliary
- Electric systems: Third rail; 600 V DC (TTC); 750 V DC (Ankara Metro)
- Current collection: Contact shoe
- Braking systems: Electro-pneumatic, rheostatic, and regenerative (H-3, H-5, H-6 only)
- Safety system: Automatic train stop
- Track gauge: 4 ft 10 7/8 in (1,495 mm) (TTC); 1,435 mm (4 ft 8 1/2 in) (Ankara Metro & Expo Express)

The H series is the third series of rapid transit rolling stock used in the subway system of Toronto, Ontario, Canada. They were built in six production sets, named H-1 to H-6, from 1965 to 1990 in Thunder Bay, Ontario, for the Toronto Transit Commission (TTC). The entire rolling stock was retired in 2014, though thirteen remaining cars still exist as work cars, including three H-1 cars.

The first five sets were manufactured by Hawker Siddeley Canada until 1979, when the company was purchased by the Urban Transportation Development Corporation (UTDC), which then took over production. They operated alongside their predecessor models, the M series, while the H-6 trains replaced the last remaining G-series trains in 1990.

All H-series cars were manufactured in a facility Hawker Siddeley inherited from Canadian Car & Foundry, which had earlier produced PCC streetcars for the TTC's streetcar network. The facility was taken over first by Bombardier Transportation in 1991, then by Alstom in 2021. They include the successor of the H series, the T series, introduced in 1996 and which replaced earlier H-series (H-1, H-2, and the prototype H-3) trains by 1999. The remaining H-4, H-5, and H-6 trains were replaced between 2011 and 2014 by the newest model, the Toronto Rocket.

== History ==
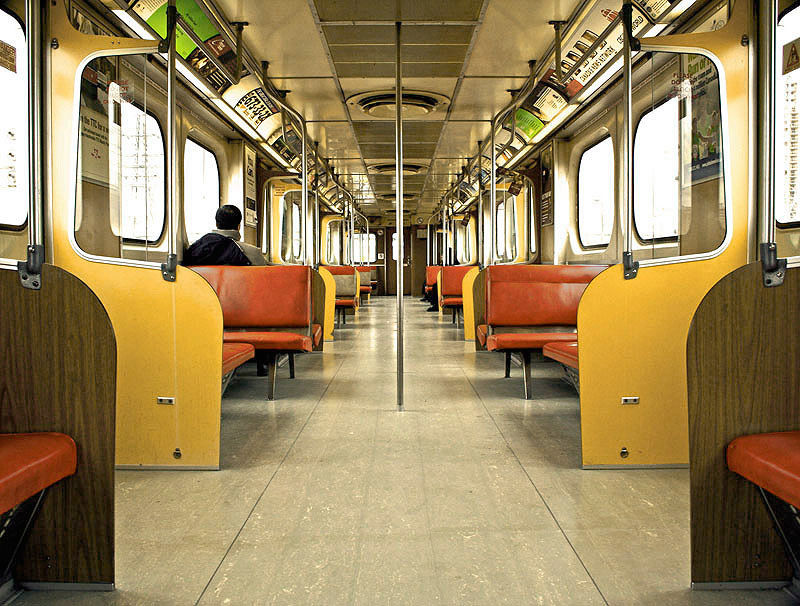
Interior of an H-4 subway car. The H-4s had an interior design similar to that of the H-2 subway cars but had less seating to allow for more passengers. The H-4s were the last H-series cars to have large padded bench seats. The H-2 and H-4 cars had beige doors, yellow panels, orange padded seats, dark brown walls and light brown floors. These were the last Toronto subway car models not equipped with air-conditioning systems.

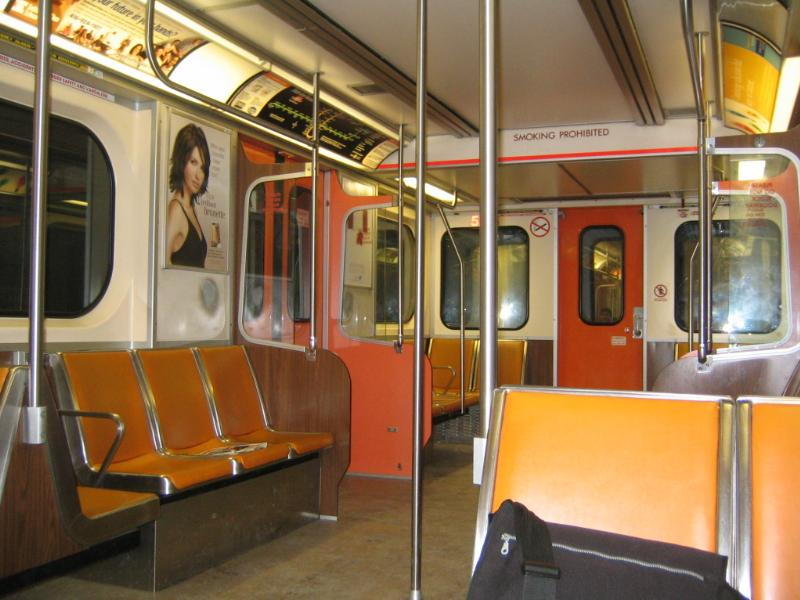
Interior of an H-6 subway car with individual vinyl orange covered seats.

Based on the 75 ft (22.86 m) M1, the early H-series cars improved on the design, notably by enlarging the operator's cab and using a single-handle controller. Revisions were made to the designs, and each production model in the H series improved on the last. The H-5s were the first subway cars in the TTC fleet to use chopper controls and were also the first cars with regenerative braking and air-conditioning systems. They had a brighter and more modern passenger interior. Black vinyl seats were replaced by red fabric seats. Individual seats replaced the padded bench seats used on previous models. The interior colour scheme consisted of red floors, cream walls, yellow doors and panels, and brown simulated wood grain panels. The H-6s replaced the original red G-class cars and were used almost exclusively on the Bloor-Danforth line, with no further H-series orders made. The H-6s were similar to the H-5s, but had light brown floors, and orange doors and panels. A prototype T-series car was built by UTDC in 1990–1991, and evaluated by the TTC. By the time the TTC was ready to order new cars in 1992, UTDC had been sold to Bombardier. Bombardier added new technology such as AC propulsion to a platform based on the predecessor H-series cars.

48 cars based on the H-1 model were built and used for the Expo Express in Montreal, for Expo 67. 108 modified H-6 cars were produced for the Ankara Metro by Bombardier from 1996 to 1997.

== Retirement and future ==
The H-1 and H-2 cars were replaced by the T1-class cars. The last 12 remaining H-1 cars were retired on November 29, 1999. All of the H-2 cars were retired by September 28, 2001. Nearly all H-1 and H-2 cars were scrapped, although a very small amount of H-1 cars are used as subway work vehicles. Some H-4 cars were retired when T1-series cars were delivered.

In 2006, the TTC placed an order with Bombardier Transportation for the first 39 articulated Toronto Rocket (TR) trains to be operated on the Yonge–University-Spadina (YUS) line. This allowed the TTC to retire the remaining H-4 and H-5 cars.

A contract option was exercised in 2010, when the TTC ordered 31 additional new TR trains making 70 trains in total. This allowed for the retirement of the H-6 subway cars on the Bloor–Danforth line and to have enough new TR trains available for the opening of the YUS line extension to Vaughan.

With the arrival of the articulated TR trains in 2011, many T1-series trains were transferred from the YUS line to the Bloor–Danforth line. This allowed for the retirement of the H-4 cars, between the fall of 2011 until January 27, 2012, when the last H-4 train made its last run during the morning rush on the Bloor-Danforth line. The H-4s were expected to be scrapped at Future Enterprises in Hamilton, Ontario, although some H-4 cars were retained for use as maintenance trains.

The H-5 trains were replaced shortly thereafter by the arrival of more TR-series trains. The last H-5 train made its final service run on June 14, 2013, as an unscheduled midday run, with the train consist 5791-5790, 5779-5778, 5789-5788 making a round-trip on the YUS line on run 96. That trip began at Wilson station en route to Finch station. On the return trip, the train encountered technical difficulties at Eglinton West station, meaning the train had to go out of service. While many H-5 subway cars were scrapped, some cars were sent to the United States for refurbishing and were expected to be shipped to the Lagos Metropolitan Area Transport Authority of Nigeria for the Lagos Rail Mass Transit project. However, the trains were scrapped instead with subway car 5790 being the last H5 to be removed from TTC property on October 2, 2013. As of 2025, Subway car 5707 remains the last H5 ever to exist sitting in the back of a building on Upton Road in Scarborough.

The H-6s were the only version of the H series still in service when, on June 20, 2014, the last H-6 train took its final run on Line 2 Bloor–Danforth. The round-trip began at Greenwood station, and headed eastbound to Kennedy station, then westbound to Kipling station and back to Kennedy station where the train was decommissioned. This marked the end of all remaining H-series subway trains which had been in service with the TTC after 49 years. (The H-6s were replaced by more T1s, which had been transferred from Line 1 to Line 2 following the arrival of more TR trains.) It was reported that some H-6 cars were to be sold to the Lagos Metropolitan Area Transport Authority for use on a new Lagos Light Rail project (along with some of the already-retired H-5 cars). However, TTC officials later announced that the deal had been cancelled. Only 75 H-5 cars were shipped to Lagos following their retirement in 2013 and all of the H-6s were scrapped after retirement in 2014. However, the 75 H-5 cars sent to the United States were scrapped in August 2015 after Eko Rail decided to purchase newly made cars from the Chinese rolling stock company CRRC Dalian.

- H-1: 5336–5499
- H-2: 5506–5575
- H-3: 5500–5505 (experimental/modified versions of the H-2 that led to development of the H-5)
- H-4: 5576–5663
- H-5: 5670–5807
- H-6: 5810–5935
