= G series (Toronto subway) =

Class of subway car in Toronto, Canada

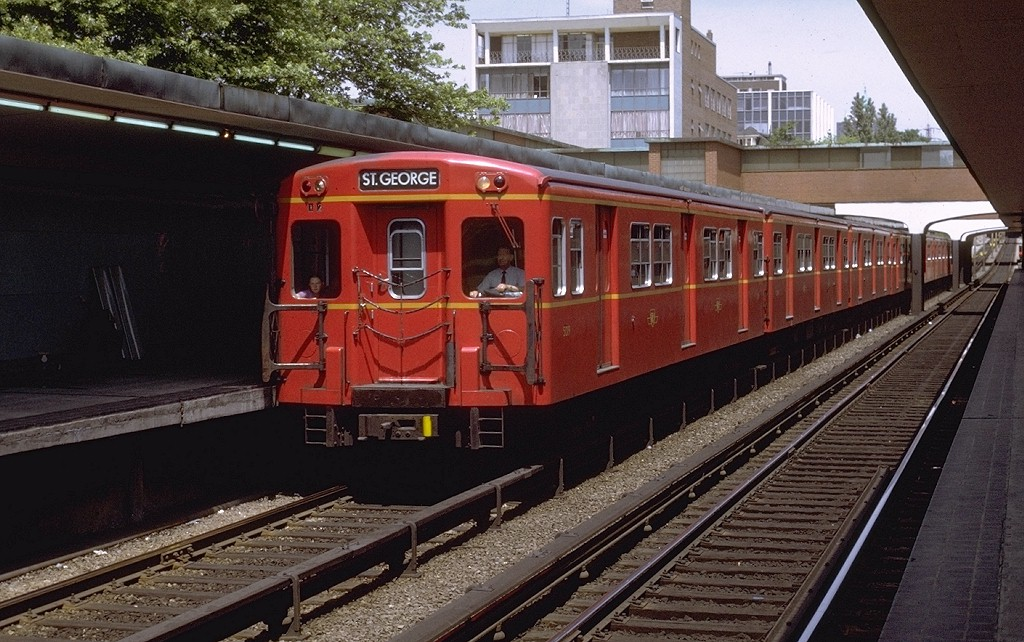
- A G-series train heads south at Rosedale station circa 1971
- In service: 1954–1990
- Manufacturer: Gloucester Railway Carriage and Wagon Company
- Built at: Gloucester, England
- Constructed: 1953–1959
- Entered service: March 30, 1954
- Retired: October 26, 1990
- Number built: 140 (total); G-1: 100; G-2: 6; G-3: 6; G-4: 28
- Number preserved: 2 (Note: Owned by Halton County Radial Railway, a private museum)
- Number scrapped: 136
- Successor: H series
- Fleet numbers: G-1: 5000–5099; G-2: 5100–5105; G-3: 5110–5115; G-4: 5200–5227
- Capacity: 62 seated
- Operator: Toronto Transit Commission
- Line served: Yonge–University

Specifications
- Car body construction: Steel (G-1, G-3, G-4); Aluminum (G-2)
- Car length: 17 m (55 ft 9 1/4 in)
- Width: 3.2 m (10 ft 6 in)
- Height: 3.5 m (11 ft 5 3/4 in)
- Doors: 6 sets (3 sets per side) per car
- Weight: 38,140 kg (84,000 lb)
- Traction motors: Crompton Parkinson
- Power output: 68 hp (51 kW)
- Auxiliaries: None (?)
- Electric systems: Third rail, 600 V DC
- Current collection: Contact shoe
- Braking systems: Westinghouse Brake & Signal Company digital electro-pneumatic braking and Electro-dynamic reheostatic service brake
- Track gauge: 4 ft 10 7/8 in (1,495 mm)

The G series was the first rolling stock of rapid transit cars used on the Toronto subway, built 1953–1959 by the Gloucester Railway Carriage and Wagon Company of Gloucester, England, for the Toronto Transit Commission (TTC) of Toronto, Canada.

As the only Toronto subway cars to be manufactured outside of Canada, its design was mainly influenced by the Q38 and R stocks of the London Underground. Since the TTC's original concept for the subway system foresaw the use of rapid transit cars derived from the Presidents' Conference Committee (PCC) design of its streetcar network, the cars were also equipped with bulls-eye incandescent lighting similar to that of a PCC, and a small operator's cabin located in the front left corner of each car. To this end, it was influenced by the 6000-series cars used on the Chicago "L", felt through the work of DeLeuw, Cather & Co. of Chicago, whom the TTC contracted as a consultant for the rapid transit project.

The G-series cars were frequently described as "robust and reliable", despite being constructed overweight and energy-inefficient. The last G-series train ran on October 26, 1990, with the G series having been replaced by H-series trains. The only surviving cars, still mated in original condition, are fleet number 5098 and 5099, which are kept at the Halton County Radial Railway in Milton, Ontario.

== Prototypes ==
Two mockup cars were delivered with slight variation from the final design:

- doors slid on the outside of the cars
- more interior lighting
- no additional handle bars for standees
- ceiling vents – missing on final design

== Design ==
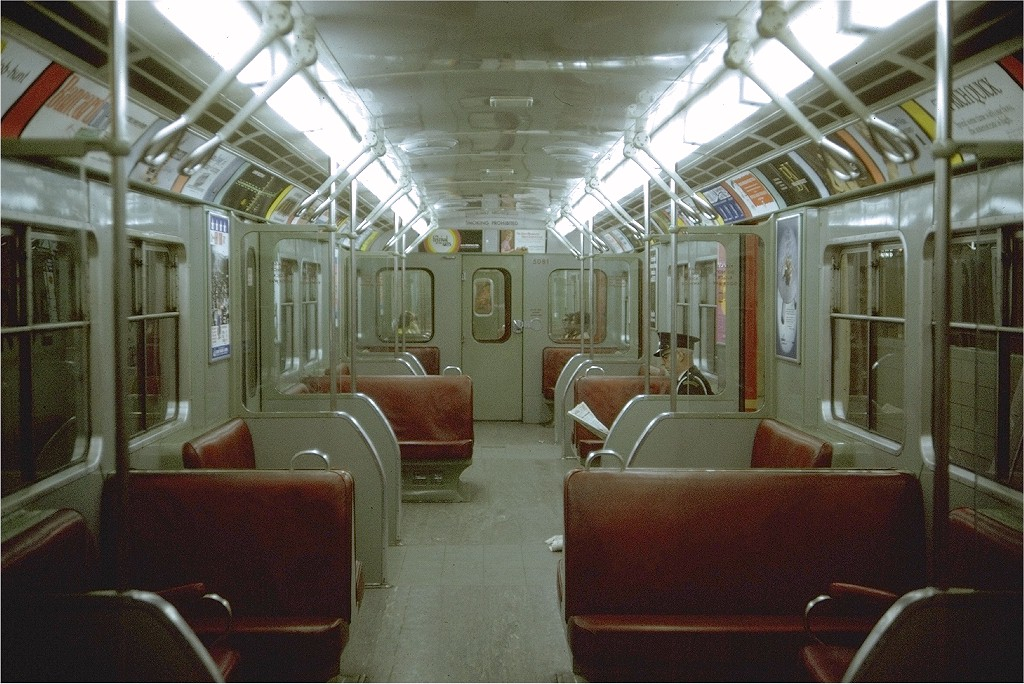
The interior of a G-1 car, one of two where the original incandescent lighting was experimentally replaced with fluorescent

A total of 140 cars were built. Most were steel-bodied and had painted exteriors; however, six G-2-series experimental aluminum-bodied cars demonstrated the benefits of using aluminum for rapid transit car construction. The G-3-class cars were built as "non-driving motors" in that they had motorized trucks but were equipped with an operator's cab without driving controls and thus could only be used in the middle of the train.

The G cars were originally designed in 2-car "married pair" formations, and were run in trains consisting of 2, 3 or 4 sets (4, 6 or 8 cars). When the G-3-class non-driving cars were introduced in 1956, 14 pairs of the G-3-class cars were inserted between G-1-class cars to form semi-permanently coupled 4-car trainsets, which could be coupled to the 2-car sets or operated on their own. The G-series vehicles were the only subway trains with painted livery.

== Scale models ==
Two 1/16 scale models of cars 5042 and 5043 were commissioned by Sir Leslie Boyce of GRC&W and constructed by Bassett-Lowke, and have been located at Hillcrest and Greenwood at various times. The model cars are stored and on display at the Hillcrest Training Centre.

A HO scale version has been produced by Canadian model railroad company Rapido Trains in celebration of the 70th anniversary of the Yonge subway line along with a diorama display of St.Clair station.

== See also ==
- 6000-series (CTA)
- Harris trains, suburban EMU cars for Melbourne, Victoria, Australia that used the same carbody
