= Hawker Siddeley Canada =

Manufacturing company

- Type: Subsidiary
- Industry: Aerospace, Mass transit/railcar manufacturing
- Founded: 1962; 64 years ago
- Defunct: August 2001
- Fate: Divested by Hawker Siddeley group and assets acquired by UTDC
- Successor: UTDC (mass transit), SNC-Lavalin (Can-Car Rail) (railcar), Orenda Engines (aerospace), Halifax Industries Limited (shipbuilding)
- Headquarters: Mississauga, Ontario, Canada
- Products: Railcar, Mass transit cars, Streetcars, Aircraft engine, Ships
- Parent: Hawker Siddeley Group
- Subsidiaries: Avro Canada (Dominion Steel and Coal Corporation, Halifax Shipyard Limited and Canadian Car and Foundry), Orenda Engines

Hawker Siddeley Canada was the Canadian unit of the Hawker Siddeley Group of the United Kingdom and manufactured railcars, subway cars, streetcars, aircraft engines and ships from the 1960s to the 1980s.

== History ==
Founded in 1962 as the Canadian division of British Hawker Siddeley Group, the company assumed the assets of the A.V. Roe Canada Company Ltd.

Hawker Siddeley Canada focused on manufacturing heavy rail cars (hopper and tank cars) and transit vehicles (subway cars, intercity railcars and streetcars). Major clients included:

- Toronto Transit Commission – H series (Toronto subway) (H1 to H5 only as H6 built by UTDC and H3 rebuilt H2 by TTC) cars
- GO Transit – bi-level coaches Series I to II (Series III to IV were jointly built with UTDC)
- Soo Line Railroad
- CN Rail Cabooses (79200-79349 c. 1967)
- Canadian Wheat Board – cylindrical grain hoppers
- Saskatchewan Grain Car Corporation – grain hoppers
- Massachusetts Bay Transportation Authority – Orange (1200 series) and Blue line (0600 series) transit cars
- National Railways of Mexico – passenger coaches (4600/4700/5600 series)

Hawker Siddeley Canada headquarters was in Mississauga, Ontario. Its formation in 1962 saw the company acquire control of several A.V. Roe Canada subsidiaries including the Canadian Car and Foundry (CC&F) as well as the Dominion Steel and Coal Corporation (DOSCO) conglomerate, which included various steel mills, coal mines, manufacturing plants, and Halifax Shipyards. Consequently, Hawker Siddeley had two primary railcar manufacturing plants:

- CC&F factory in Thunder Bay, Ontario, for manufacturing railway transit cars, and
- DOSCO factory in Trenton, Nova Scotia, for manufacturing railway freight cars (TrentonWorks), along with the Trenton Forge - the largest forge in North America.

Hawker Siddeley forced its DOSCO subsidiary to close money-losing coal mines and steel mills, subsequently expropriated by the federal and Nova Scotia governments (see: Cape Breton Development Corporation and Sydney Steel Corporation). Likewise, CC&F was forced to shed various assets. Halifax Shipyards was sold to Irving Shipbuilding Inc., a subsidiary of J.D. Irving Limited, in the 1990s.

Hawker Siddeley Canada's operations were then acquired by Kingston-based UTDC (later sold to Bombardier Transportation of Montreal, Quebec). SNC-Lavalin purchased the railcar business but mothballed the TrentonWorks plant, which was later acquired by the Government of Nova Scotia and sold to Greenbrier. SNC-Lavalin sold the Thunder Bay plant to Bombardier Transportation and the Hawker Siddeley Canada name was ultimately dissolved in 2001. Bombardier Transportation was later sold to French rail manufacturer Alstom including the former Hawker plant in 2021.

== Products ==
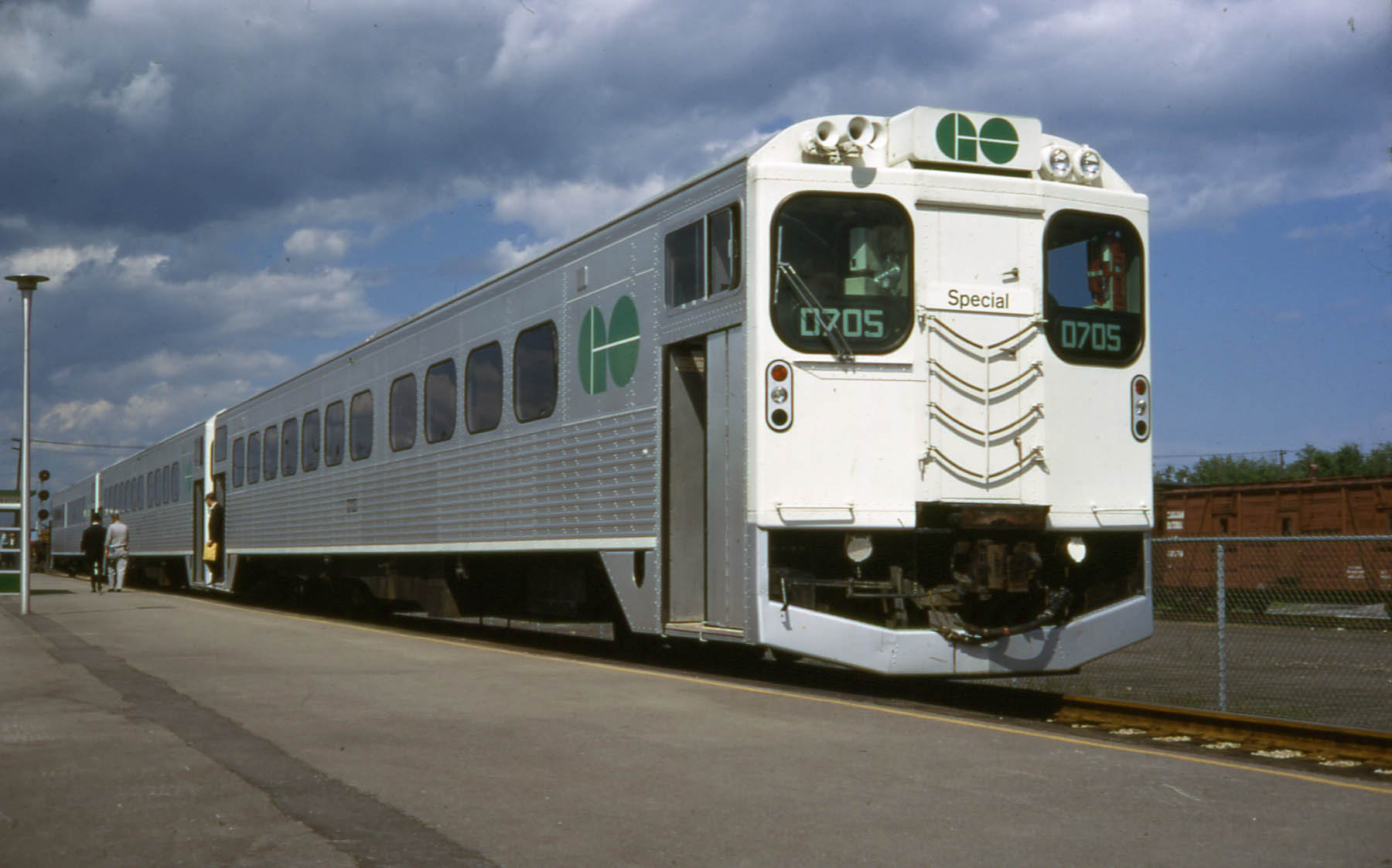
GO Transit cab car

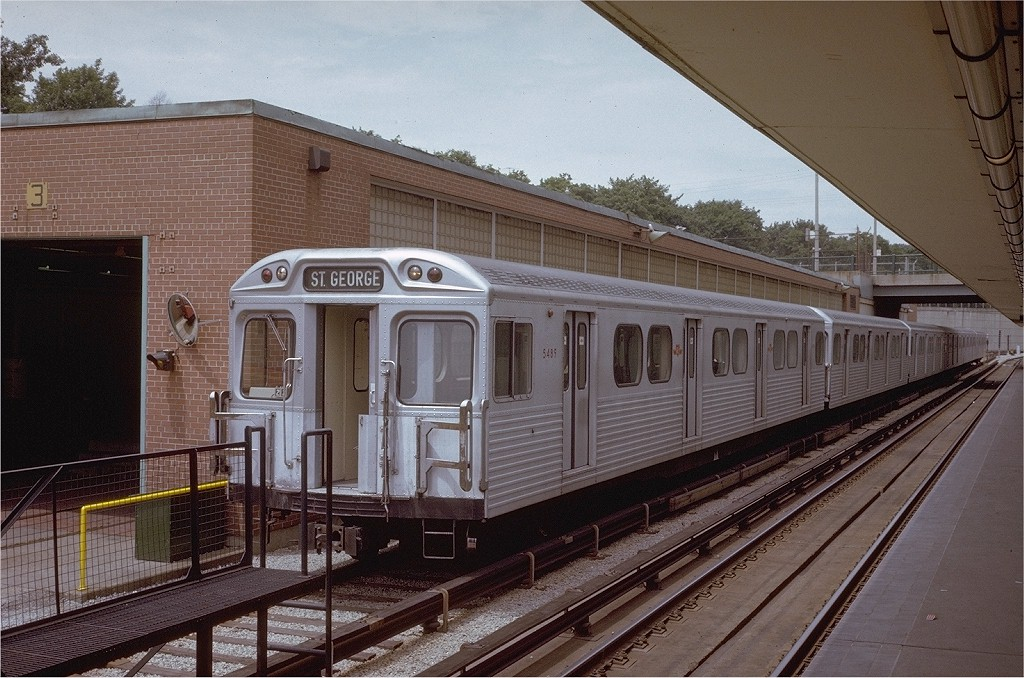
An H1 subway car built for the Toronto Transit Commission

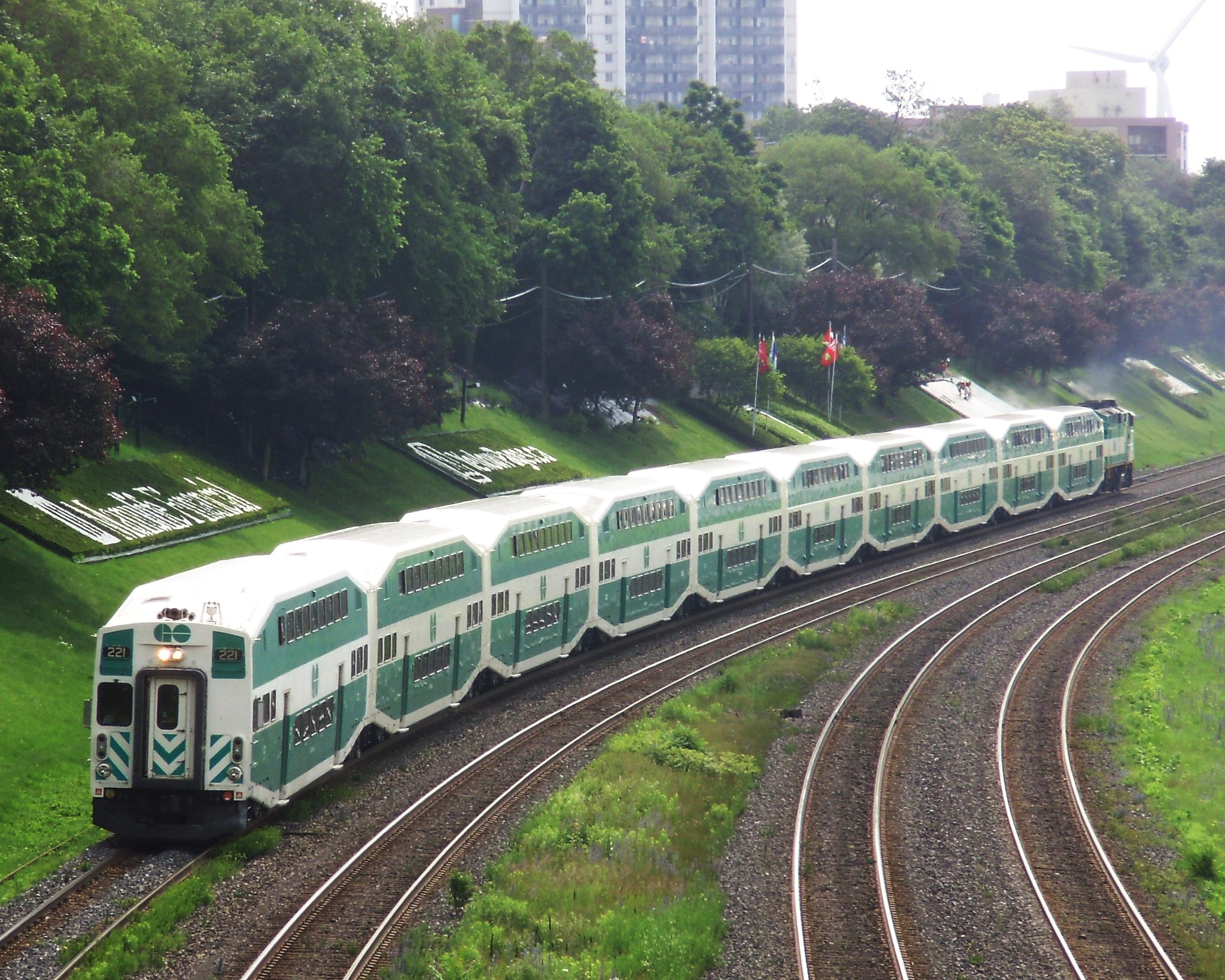
A GO Transit train consisting of bi-level coaches originally built by Hawker Siddley

A partial list of products made by Hawker Siddeley Canada:

Transit

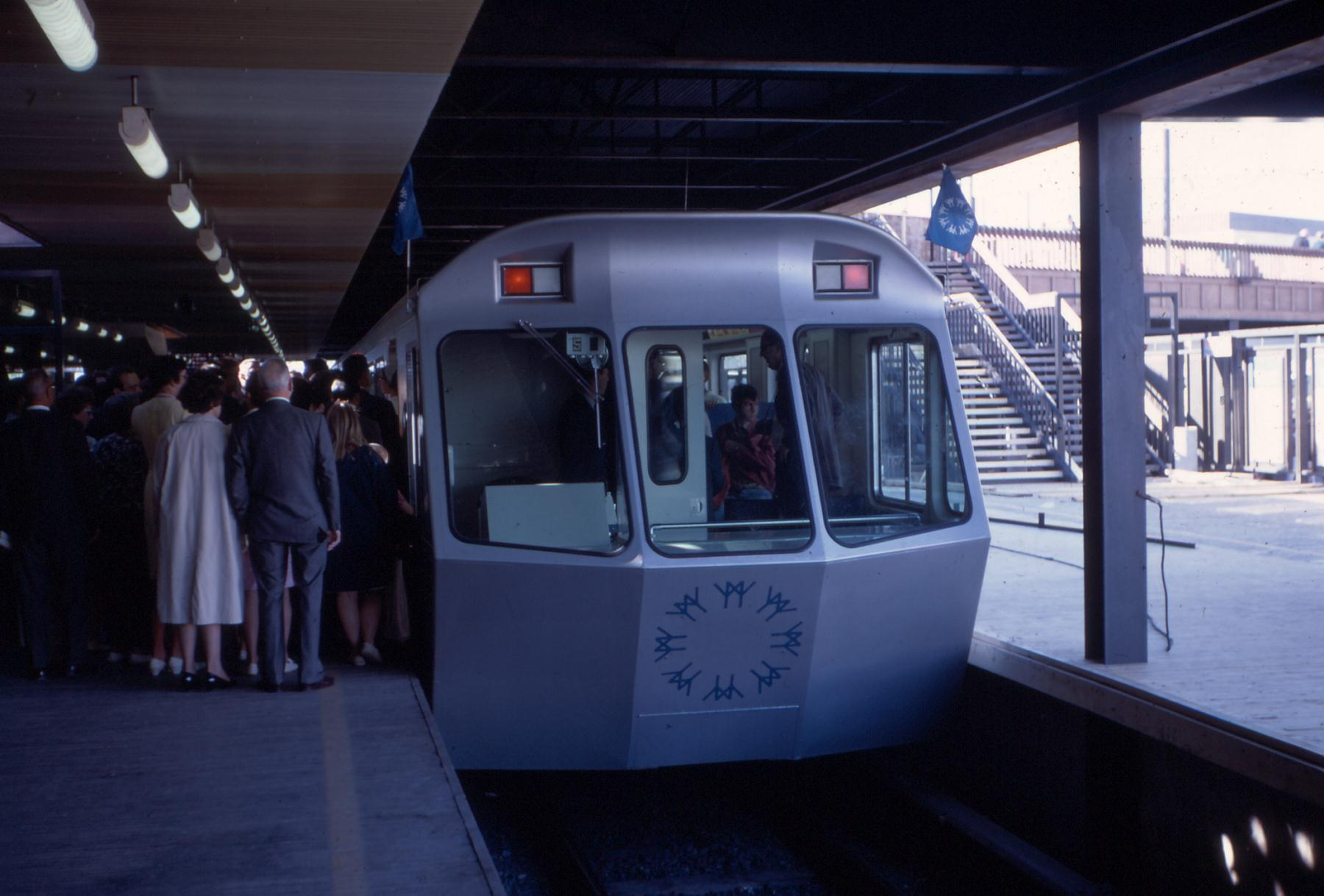
Expo Express car

- Subway cars - for the Toronto Transit Commission (1965–1979)
- Automated Expo Express surface metro cars - for the Expo 67 World's Fair (1965)
- PA3-type rapid transit cars for Port Authority Trans-Hudson (1972) and Massachusetts Bay Transportation Authority's Blue Line (1979) and Orange Line (1980)

Aviation

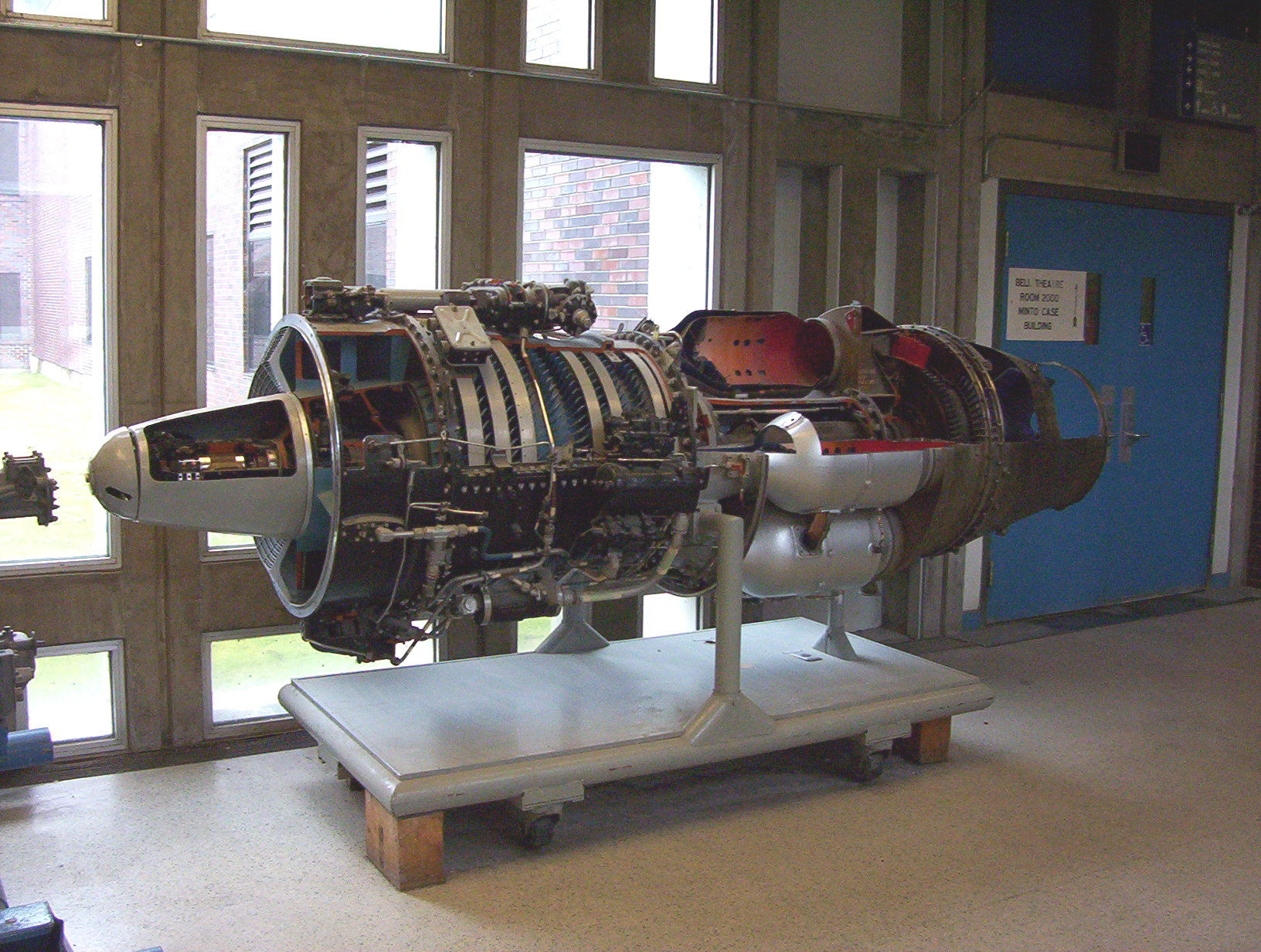
Orenda engine on display at Carleton University

Hawker-Siddeley Canada also manufactured aircraft engines for Avro Canada's Orenda Engines and other aircraft manufacturers:

- General Electric J79
- General Electric J85-CAN-40
- General Electric J-85-CAN-15

Rail

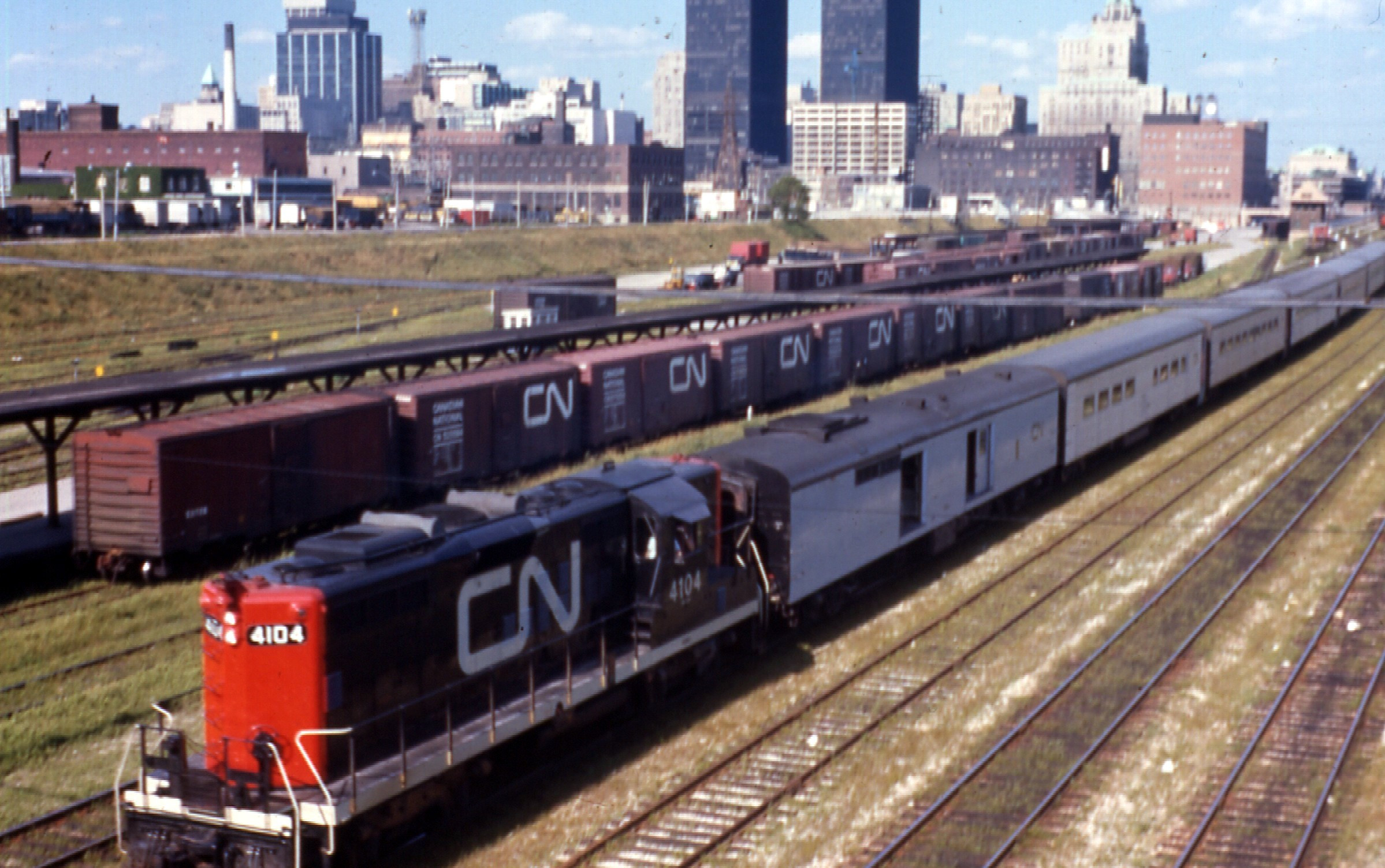
CN Rail locomotive pulling Tempo passenger cars

Hawker-Siddeley Transportation also produced railway freight cars primarily for Canadian railways and leasing companies during the 1970s and 1980s at plants in Thunder Bay, Ontario and Trenton, Nova Scotia. Today the Thunder Bay plant is owned by Bombardier Transportation. The Trenton plant was sold in 1988 to Lavalin Industries and renamed TrentonWorks. The Greenbrier Companies acquired the plant in 1995 but during a serious contraction within the railcar sector in the mid 2000s closed the plant. The Thunder Bay plant primarily built passenger rail and transit equipment, while the Trenton plant built freight cars.

- Covered Hopper Cars - for grain and other dry bulk commodities
- Tank Cars - for liquids and compressed gases
- Box Cars - for paper and general freight
- Flat Cars - for lumber, steel, vehicles and large bulky freight
- Gondolas - for steel, logs, stone, other bulk freight
- Passenger cars
  - RT85 lightweight "Tempo" passenger cars (Coach Class T3, Club Coach Class T1 and Club Café Class T2) for CN and NdeM.
  - RTC85/RTC-85SP/RTC-85SPD lightweight commuter cars for GO Transit.
  - BiLevel coaches.

Ships

See Halifax Shipyard - through the purchase of A.V. Roe Canada

== See also ==
- Urban Transportation Development Corporation
- Bombardier Transportation
- Montreal Locomotive Works
