= Jeffrey S. Lyons =

Canadian lawyer and community activist

- Born: 1939 or 1940; Hamilton, Ontario
- Died: July 26, 2015 (aged 75); Toronto, Ontario
- Education: University of Toronto
- Occupations: Lawyer, lobbyist
- Spouse: Sandy
- Children: 3
- Relatives: Sue-Ann Levy (niece)

Jeffrey S. Lyons (1939 or 1940 – July 26, 2015) was a Toronto lawyer, lobbyist, and community activist.

== Background ==
Lyons was born in Hamilton, Ontario, where his father owned the city's first chain of grocery stores, Lyons Food Mart.

Lyons moved to Toronto to study law, graduating from the University of Toronto and a member of the Law Society of Upper Canada. He practiced law in Toronto until his death at age 75.

Lyons was the founder of the Lyons Group and held various private and public roles, including a term as chair of the Toronto Transit Commission from 1987 to 1989.

Politically, Lyons was a fundraiser for both Progressive Conservative Party of Canada and the Progressive Conservative Party of Canada as well as numerous politicians and was friends with Paul Godfrey when he was both Chairman of Metropolitan Toronto and later publisher of the Toronto Sun.

As a lawyer, Lyons was a pioneer in Canada of the use of class action lawsuits, successfully arguing a case in the 1970s against Ford Motor Company which led to a 5-year anti-rust guarantee for consumers.

His niece, Sue Anne Levy, led a massive defense of her uncle in the pages of the Toronto Sun.

== MFP scandal ==
Lyons was a prominent lobbyist in the 1980s and 1990s who was especially prominent in lobbying at the municipal level. His reputation was tarnished and his influence diminished as a result of the MFP scandal. Justice Denise Bellamy was appointed to lead an inquiry into the computer leasing scandal and described Lyons in her report as the city's "most sought-after lobbyist" during the mayoralty of Mel Lastman. In 1999 Lyons had helped two firms, MFP and Dell Financial Services (DFS), compete for the same city computer-leasing contract. He was alleged to have demanded a $150,000 payment from Dell as a "success fee" for the contract if they won. The inquiry report concluded that it was "plausible" Lyons tried to solicit the fee on behalf of himself or city budget chief Tom Jakobek. In his testimony to the inquiry, Lyons admitted to funnelling $15,000 in campaign contributions from a city supplier to city councillors. While the Ontario Provincial Police investigated the matter after the inquiry, no charges were ever laid.

== Personal ==
Lyons was the uncle to Toronto Sun columnist Sue-Ann Levy. Lyons died at the age of 75 on July 26, 2015, after collapsing while running.

== Directorship held by Lyons ==
- Director of the Greater Toronto Airport Authority
- Director - Via Rail Canada
- Director of Ontario Place
- Member of the Executive Committee of the Chinese Cultural Centre of Greater Toronto
- Director on both the Progressive Conservative Party of Ontario Fund and the Progressive Conservative Party of Canada Fund
- Chairman of the Toronto Transit Commission
- Chairman of Gray Coach Lines Limited
- Chairman of Trentway-Wagar Properties
- Chairman of the Jays Care Foundation
- Vice Chairman of the Toronto Police Services Board
- President of the Expo’98 Consortium

Preceded by Julian Porter	Chairman of the Toronto Transit Commission; 1987-1989	Succeeded by Lois Griffin
