= Richard Leary =

Richard Leary may refer to:

- USS Richard P. Leary, a Fletcher-class destroyer of the United States Navy
- Richard Henry Leary (1840–1895), mayor of Dunedin, New Zealand
- Rick Leary, American-Canadian transportation executive
