= Toronto External Contracts Inquiry =

Investigation of municipal conflicts of interests

The Toronto External Contracts Inquiry is a judicial inquiry into allegations of conflict of interest around contracts entered into by Toronto, Ontario's municipal government in 1998 and 1999.

It is a follow-up to the city's earlier Computer Leasing Inquiry, and is investigating three other questionable contracts. However, as with the earlier inquiry, the External Contracts Inquiry is commissioned by Madam Justice Denise Bellamy of the Ontario Superior Court of Justice.

The External Contracts Inquiry was established by Toronto City Council on October 1, 2002, as an expansion of the Computer Leasing Inquiry. It began hearings on October 18, 2004, after the Computer Leasing Inquiry ended.

== TMACS ==
The first contract investigated by the External Contracts Inquiry involved the city's tax and billing management system.

On January 1, 1998, the city of Toronto and its five suburban cities (Scarborough, North York, Etobicoke, East York and York) were amalgamated into the single "megacity" of Toronto.

During the amalgamation process, the six municipal governments had to merge their computer systems. Five of the municipalities used a system called TXM, while North York used a system called TMACS. North York's treasurer, Wanda Liczyk, was the sole voice in favour of adopting TMACS for the amalgamated city, and when she subsequently became treasurer of the "megacity", she implemented TMACS without consulting city council.

TMACS was developed for North York's city government by two American software consultants, David Maxson and Michael Saunders. Testimony before the inquiry has confirmed that from 1989 to 1991, Saunders and Liczyk had a personal romantic relationship.

Although their relationship ended before Saunders was contracted by the city of Toronto, city staff have testified that Liczyk and Saunders still had a close friendship. In her testimony to the inquiry, Liczyk has acknowledged that her relationship with Saunders may have created the appearance of favouritism in her decisions involving Saunders. However, in response to suggestions that she should have declared a conflict of interest and recused herself from such decisions, Liczyk has testified that she is able to separate personal and business matters.

It has also been testified that Saunders was often rude and abrasive to city staff.

== Other Contracts ==
Two other city contracts will be investigated by the Inquiry. Testimony around these contracts has not yet been presented.
