= Karl L. Mallette =

Karl L. Mallette was a Toronto politician and Toronto Transit Commission Chairman and Commissioner.

A compositor by trade, he was first elected to local political office in 1959. He served on the Council of the Borough of Scarborough, first as a councillor and later as a controller. He was also a member of the Metropolitan Toronto Council. He was appointed a TTC commissioner in 1972, and was chairman from 1973 to 1975. He remained on the commission until 1984, and served as TTC's vice-chairman, and as president of TTC subsidiary Gray Coach Lines.

Preceded by Franklin I. Young	Chairman of the Toronto Transit Commission; 1973-1975	Succeeded by G. Gordon Hurlburt
