= Toronto Transit Commission =

Public transit agency located in Toronto, Ontario

- TTC logo and corporate crest

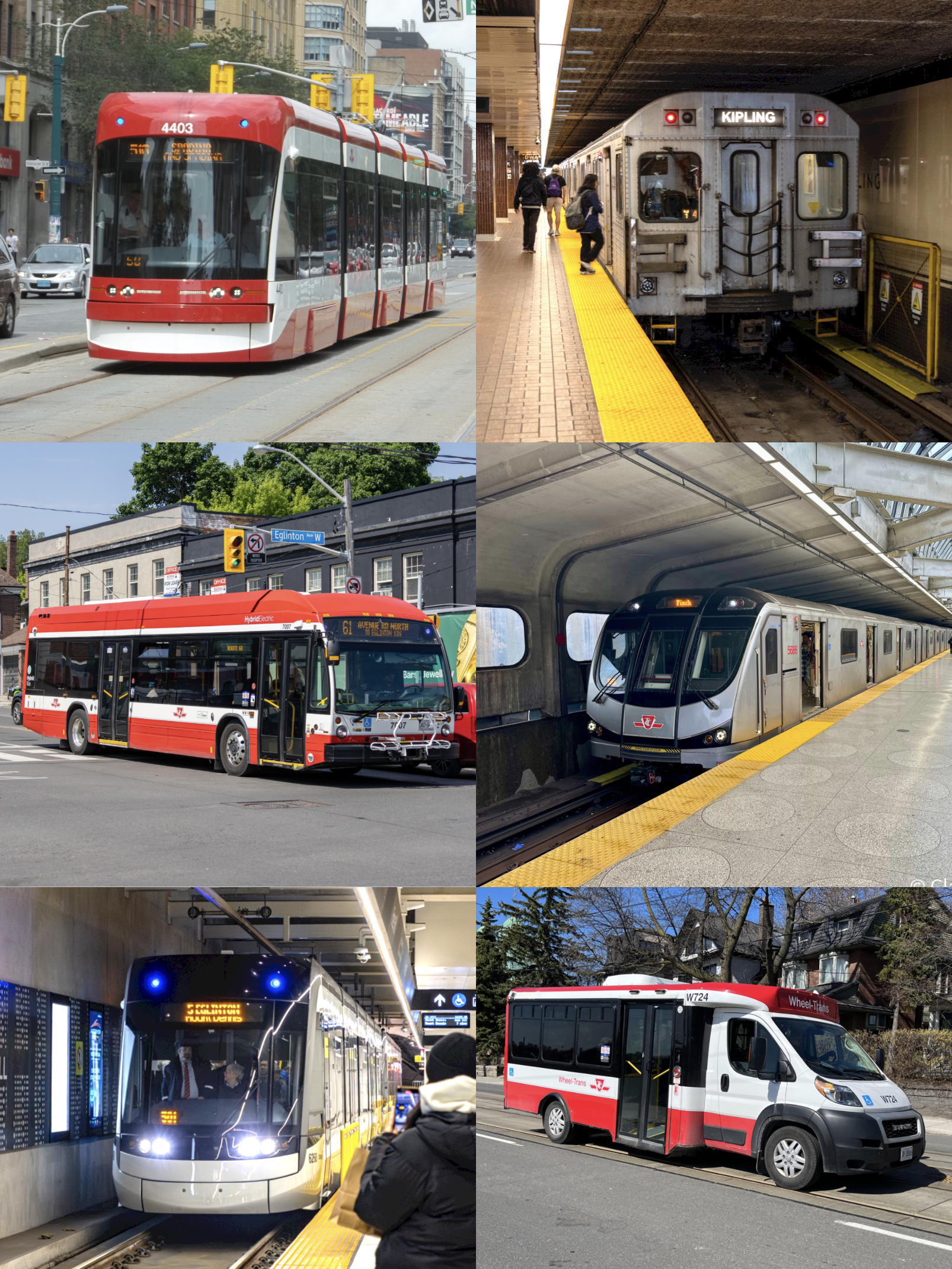
- From top, left to right: Flexity Outlook streetcar, T1 subway train, hybrid electric Nova Bus LFS, Toronto Rocket subway train, Flexity Freedom light rail vehicle, and Ram ProMaster CS-2 minibus.

Overview
- Owner: City of Toronto
- Locale: Greater Toronto Area
- Transit type: Bus; paratransit; rapid transit; streetcar
- Number of lines: 5 rapid transit lines; 11 streetcar routes; 160 bus routes
- Number of stations: 109 rapid transit stations; 620 streetcar stops; 8,640 bus stops
- Daily ridership: 2,435,100 (weekdays, Q2 2026)
- Annual ridership: 803,792,600 (2025)
- Key people: Paul Ainslie, chair; Mandeep Lali, chief executive officer
- Headquarters: William McBrien Building; 1900 Yonge Street; Toronto, Ontario, Canada
- Website: ttc.ca

Operation
- Began operation: September 1, 1921; 105 years ago
- Number of vehicles: 2,038 buses; 848 rapid transit cars; 233 streetcars; 268 Wheel-Trans buses

Technical
- Track gauge: 1,495 mm (4 ft 10 7/8 in) Toronto gauge (subway, streetcar); 1,435 mm (4 ft 8 1/2 in) standard gauge (LRT lines)

The Toronto Transit Commission (TTC) is the primary public transit agency in Toronto, Ontario, Canada, operating the majority of the city's bus and rail services. It is the oldest and largest of the urban transit service providers in Canada and has numerous connections to systems serving its surrounding municipalities.

Established as the Toronto Transportation Commission in 1921, the TTC operates 5 rapid transit lines, 74 subway stations, 43 light rail transit stops, approximately 167 bus routes, and 11 streetcar lines. The TTC is the most heavily used urban transit system in Canada; in 2025, the system had a total of 800,212,000 boardings.

== History ==
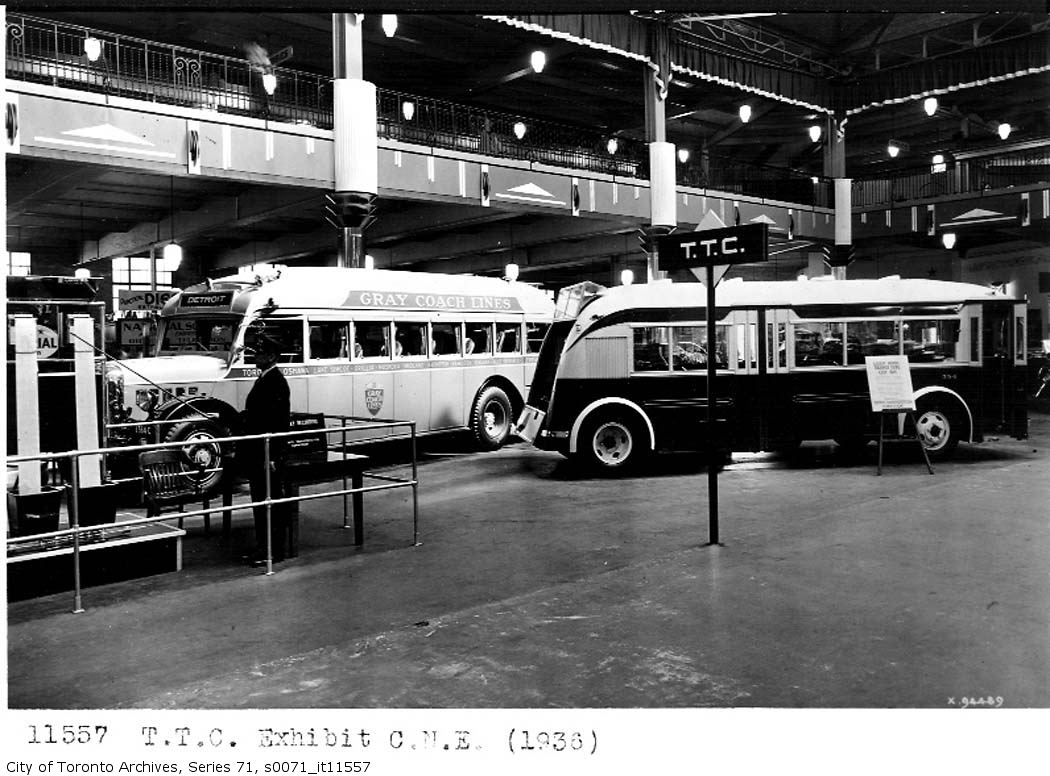
Two buses used by the TTC, 1936. The left bus was used by the agency's intercity bus line, whereas the right was used for local bus routes.

Public transit in Toronto started in 1849 with a privately operated transit service. In later years, the city operated some routes, but in 1921, assumed control over all routes and formed the Toronto Transportation Commission to operate them. During this period, streetcars provided the bulk of the service. In 1954, the TTC adopted its present name, opened the first subway line from Union to Eglinton, and greatly expanded its service area to cover the newly formed municipality of Metropolitan Toronto (which eventually amalgamated into the present City of Toronto). The system has evolved to feature a wide network of surface routes, with the subway lines as the backbone. On February 17, 2008, the TTC made many service improvements, reversing more than a decade of service reductions and only minor improvements.

In addition to buses, streetcars, and subways, the TTC also operated the Toronto Island ferry service from 1927 until it was transferred to the Metro Parks and Culture department in 1962. The City of Toronto now operates the ferry through its Fleet Services Division. The TTC also operated a suburban and regional intercity bus operator, Gray Coach Lines, from 1927 to 1990. Gray Coach used interurban coaches to link Toronto to points throughout southern Ontario. In addition, Gray Coach operated tour buses in association with Gray Line Tours. The main terminal was the Metropolitan Toronto Bus Terminal on Elizabeth Street north of Dundas Street, downtown. In 1954, Gray Coach expanded further when it acquired suburban routes from independent bus operators not merged with the TTC as it expanded to cover Metro Toronto. By the 1980s, Gray Coach faced fierce competition in the interurban service in the GTA. The TTC sold Gray Coach Lines in 1990 to Stagecoach Holdings, which split the operation between Greyhound Canada and the Government of Ontario three years later.

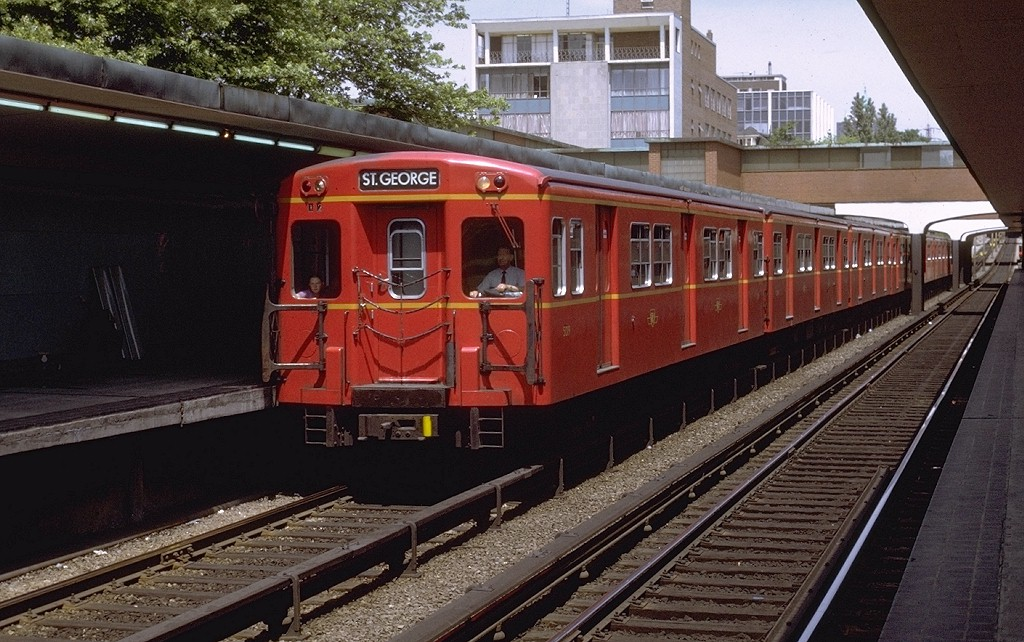
The TTC's slogan, "Ride the Rocket", originates from the red-painted G-series trains that were in service from 1954 to 1990.

The Gloucester subway cars, the first version of TTC subway cars, known as "red rockets" because of their bright red exterior, have been retired. The current T-series trains also have a red interior color scheme. The name lives on as the TTC uses the phrase to advertise the service, such as "Ride the Rocket" in advertising material, "Rocket" in the names of some express buses, and the new "Toronto Rocket" subway cars, which began revenue operation on July 21, 2011. Another common slogan is "The Better Way".

=== Finances ===
The TTC recovered 69.6 percent of its operating costs from the fare box in 2017. From its creation in 1921 until 1971, the TTC was self-supporting both for capital and operations (it had to pay property taxes until 1967). Through the Great Depression and World War II, it accumulated reserves that allowed it to expand considerably after the war, both with subways and major steady growth of its bus services into the suburbs. It was not until 1971 that the Metro Toronto government and the province started to provide operational funding, required primarily due to rising costs of delivering transit to low-density suburbs in Metro Toronto and large wage increases. Deficits and government funding soared throughout the 1970s and 1980s, followed by service cuts and a period of ridership decline in the 1990s, partly attributable to recession.

In 1997, the Progressive Conservative government under Premier Mike Harris implemented the "Common Sense Revolution" which, among other things, cut CA$42 million in provincial financing support for the Eglinton West subway line, and cut $718 million in municipal transit support, placing the entire burden of financing the system on municipalities and leaving the TTC with a $95.8 million/year funding shortfall. The TTC cut back service with a significant curtailment put into effect on February 18, 1996. Since then, the TTC has consistently been in financial difficulties. Service cuts were averted in 2007, though, when Toronto City Council voted to introduce new taxes to help pay for city services, including the TTC. As a result, since 2011, the TTC became the largest transit operator in Anglo-America not to receive provincial or state funding. The TTC has received federal funding for capital projects from as early as 2009. The TTC is also considered one of the costliest transit systems per fare price in North America. For the 2011 operating year, the TTC had a projected operating budget of $1.45 billion. Revenue from fares covered approximately 70 percent of the budget, whereas the remaining 30 percent originated from the City. From 2009 through 2011, provincial and federal funding amounted to 0 percent of the budget. In contrast to this, the Société de transport de Montréal receives approximately 10 percent of its operating budget from the Quebec provincial government, and OC Transpo receives 9 percent of its funding from the province. The fairness of preferentially funding transit in specific Canadian cities has been questioned by citizens.

On August 12, 2020, the Province of Ontario promised $404 million for TTC operations to compensate for reduced ridership and revenue loss during the COVID-19 pandemic, with more funding to come later. The TTC projected a shortfall of $700 million in 2020.

== Operations ==
=== Buses ===
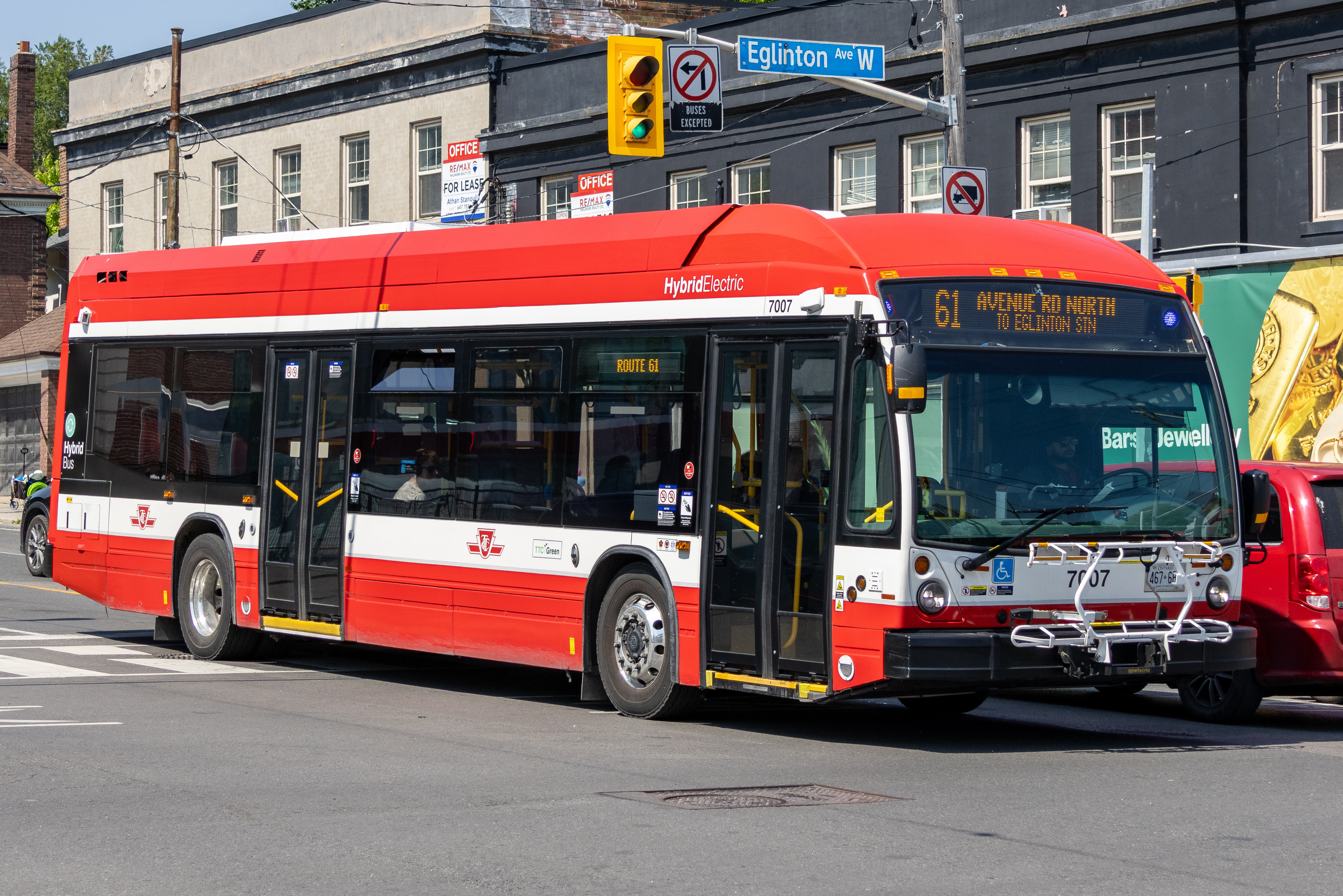
2023 Nova Bus LFS HEV

Buses are a large part of TTC operations today. However, before about 1960, they played a minor role compared to streetcars. Buses began to operate in the city in 1921, and became necessary for areas without streetcar service. After an earlier experiment with trolley buses in the 1920s, the Toronto trolley bus system that was relaunched in 1947 grew to nine routes, but all trolley bus routes were converted to bus operation between 1991 and 1993. The TTC always used the term "trolley coach" to refer to its trackless electric vehicles. Hundreds of old buses have been replaced with the low-floor Orion VII, and the TTC has acquired many hybrid electric buses. The TTC's hybrid buses, the Orion VII HEVs, were first put on the road in 2006; these were followed by the new 224 Orion VII Next Generation Hybrids in 2008 (. The next order of 190 buses, brought the total number of hybrids to 564, second only to New York City. The TTC added onto their hybrid buses fleet once again in 2009 with an additional 120 Orion VII NG HEV buses. Older TTC Orion VIIs from 2001 to 2006 feature the standard "breadbox" style, whereas newer buses, from 2007 onwards, feature Orion's new, more stylish body. With a total of 2,194 buses, the TTC is the third-largest transit bus operator in North America, behind the Metropolitan Transportation Authority in New York City (more than 5,600) and the Los Angeles County Metropolitan Transportation Authority (2,911).

The TTC also runs Wheel-Trans, a paratransit service for the physically disabled with special low-floor buses designed to accommodate wheelchairs and to make boarding easier for ambulatory customers with limited mobility.

The TTC ordered 153 Nova LFS Artic articulated buses with all newly ordered buses in service by January 2015. At 18 metres (60 ft) long, the Nova LFS Artics hold about 112 passengers, compared with 65 on a standard 12-metre (40 ft) bus.

Some of the newer TTC buses have USB-A ports for passengers to charge their mobile devices.

=== Subway ===
Schematic Toronto subway and streetcar map as of 2026. Note: Map does not reflect streetcar lines diverted or suspended due to Ontario Line construction.

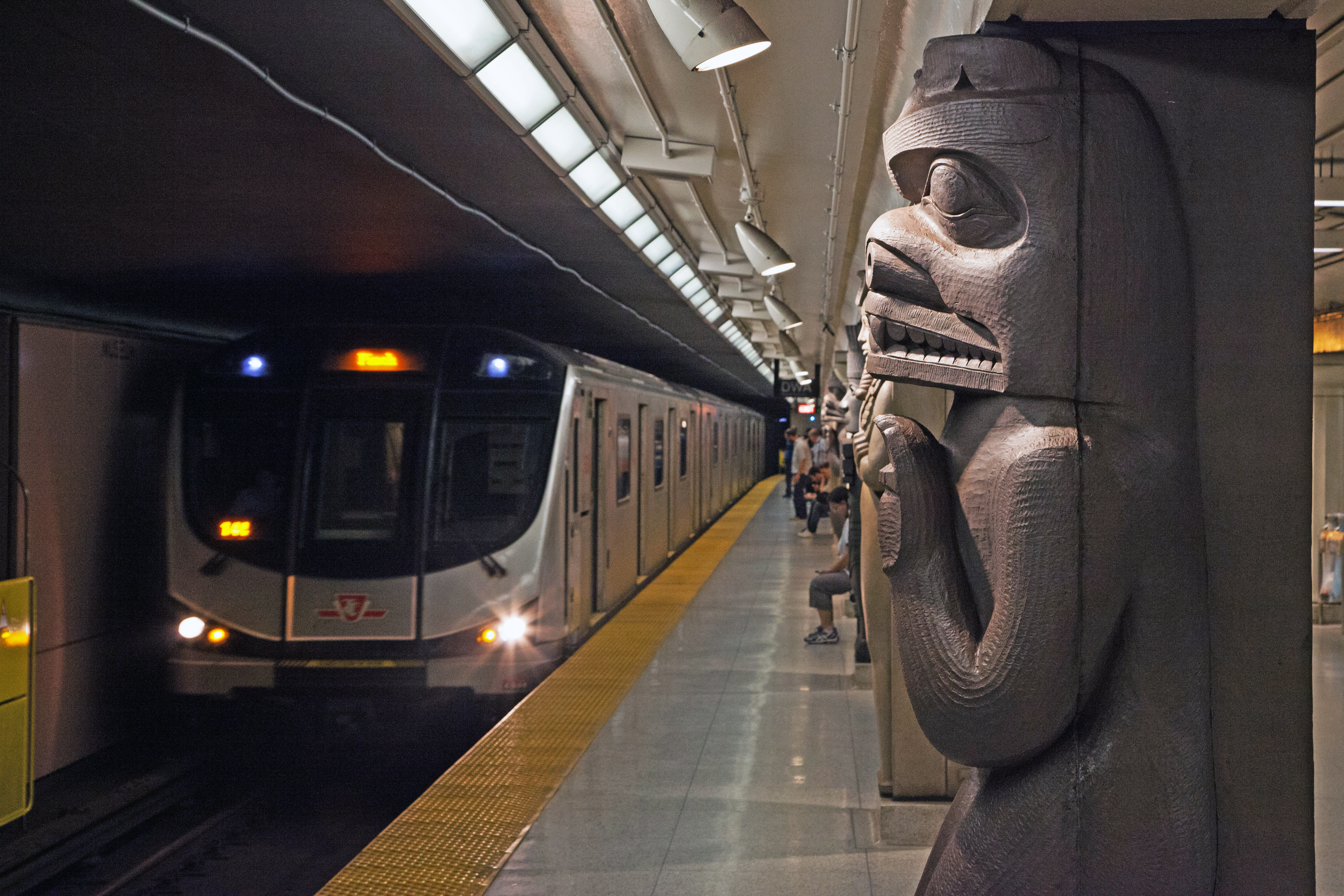
A Toronto Rocket subway train arrives at Museum station. The station is one of 74 operated along three different heavy rail subway lines.

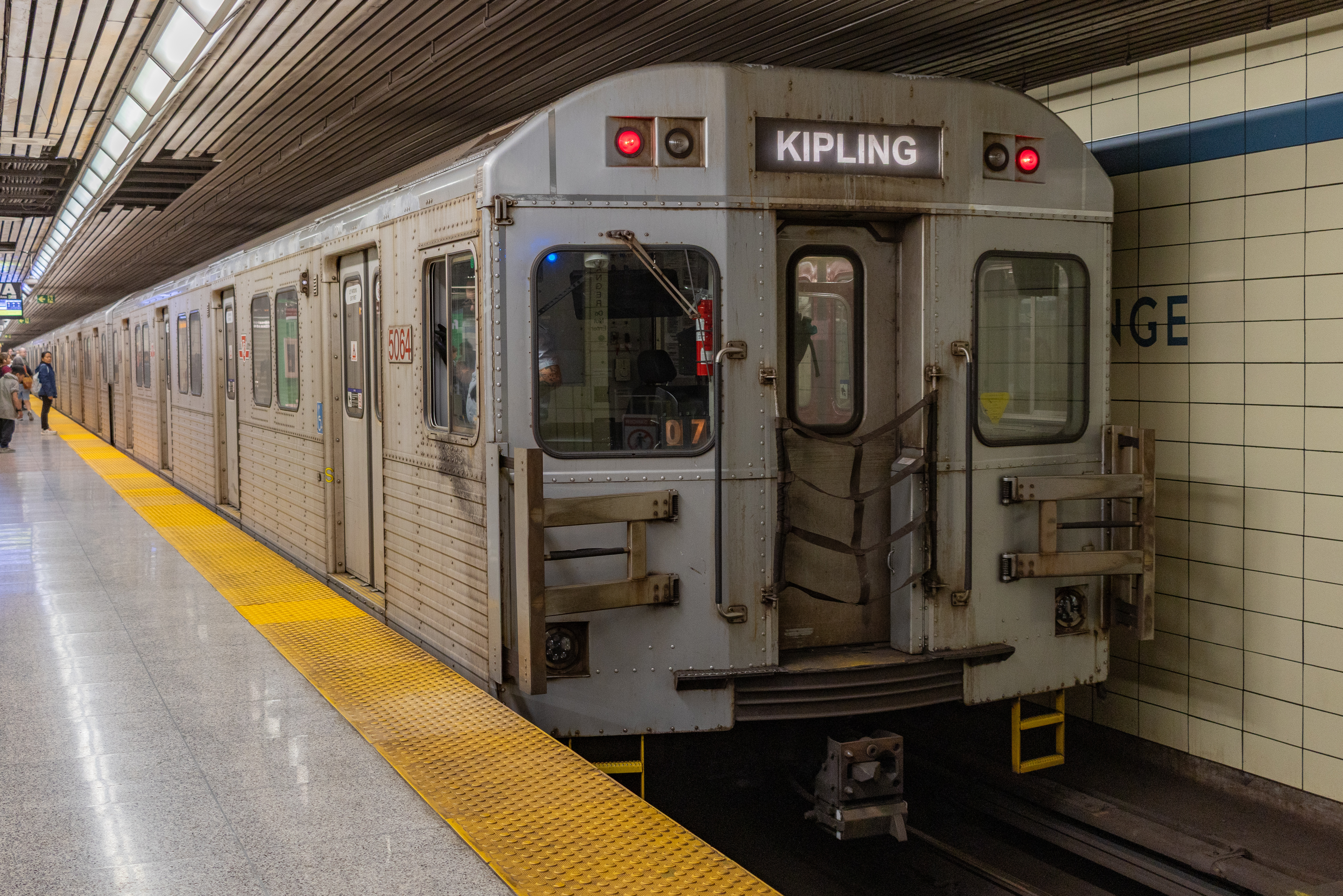
T1 subway train at Bloor–Yonge station in 2025

As of February 2026, the TTC operates 3 heavy rail lines and 2 light rail transit lines:

- Line 1 Yonge–University: Canada's first subway line. A U-shaped mostly north–south heavy rail line that opened in 1954 and was last extended in 2017.
- Line 2 Bloor–Danforth: An east–west heavy rail line that opened in 1966 and was last extended in 1980
- Line 4 Sheppard: An east–west heavy rail line that opened in 2002
- Line 5 Eglinton: An east–west light rail transit line that opened in 2026
- Line 6 Finch West: An east–west light rail transit line that opened in 2025

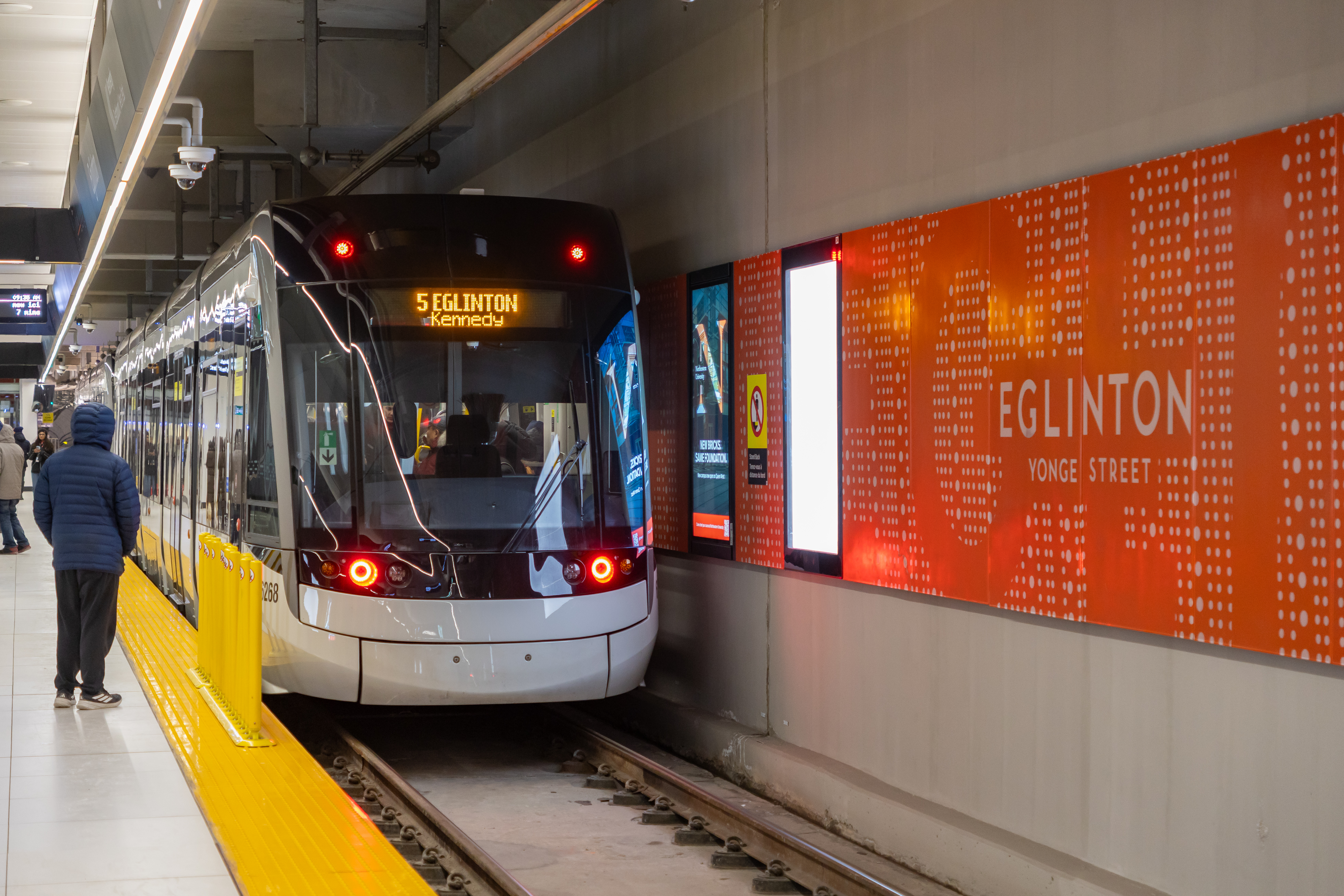
Line 5 Flexity Freedom at Eglinton station (2026)

From 1985 until 2023, Line 3 Scarborough, a partly elevated light metro line, served the district of Scarborough.

The three subway lines are served by 678 cars grouped in trains of four cars on Line 4 Sheppard, and six cars on Line 1 Yonge–University and Line 2 Bloor–Danforth. The three subway lines share non-revenue track connections and use the same technology. The rolling stock in use consists of the Toronto Rocket trains on Lines 1 and 4 and the T-series trains on Line 2. Line 3 Scarborough had a fleet of 28 S-series cars grouped into trains of four cars each and was not compatible with other subway lines, given that the S-series cars used 1,435 mm (4 ft 8 1/2 in) standard gauge. It shared no track connections or equipment. Due to the increasing difficulty of performing critical maintenance work on the S-series trains, the existing Line 3 Scarborough service was initially scheduled to be decommissioned permanently in November 2023; instead, the line closed four months ahead of schedule after a derailment on July 24, 2023. The line has been replaced by TTC bus service until the Line 2 Scarborough subway extension to Sheppard and McCowan opens for revenue service in 2030 at the earliest.

All subway lines provide service seven days a week from approximately 5:45 a.m. to 1:30 a.m. the following day (last train runs at approximately 1:45 a.m. in each direction) except for Sundays, when start of service is delayed until approximately 8:00 a.m. During the overnight periods, the subway and its stations are closed to enable maintenance at track level and in the stations themselves. Overnight service is provided by buses and streetcars operating above ground. These overnight routes are issued numbers in the 300-series and are referred to as Blue Night routes, indicated by a typical TTC bus stop sign with a blue band added.

==== Projects under construction ====
The Ontario Line, which is a rapid transit line and successor to the Relief Line, is expected to be completed by 2030. The Ontario government estimates the line's cost at $10.9 billion for the 15-kilometre (9.3 mi) stretch from Ontario Place to Don Mills Road and Eglinton Avenue East at Don Valley station (part of Line 5). It is the largest single expansion in Toronto subway history.

The Scarborough subway extension of Line 2 Bloor–Danforth is a 7.8-kilometre (4.8 mi) subway extension, which will continue Line 2 east towards McCowan Road and north towards Scarborough City Centre and to a new terminal at the intersection of McCowan Road and Sheppard Avenue. The $5.5-billion extension will replace the defunct Line 3 Scarborough and is expected to be complete in 2030 at the earliest.

The Line 5 Eglinton west extension will extend Line 5 Eglinton to Renforth station by 2030 or 2031 and will be mostly underground. After its completion, the line will travel through all six of Toronto's districts that were amalgamated in 1998 and bring the Toronto subway to Mississauga.

The Yonge North subway extension is an extension of Line 1 Yonge–University proposed by the government of Ontario, nearly identical to the existing planned Yonge subway extension proposed by the City of Toronto, Metrolinx, and York Region. It would extend Line 1 into Richmond Hill in York Region. The 7.4-kilometre (4.6 mi) line would travel north from Finch station to Richmond Hill Centre Terminal at Highway 7 and Yonge Street. The estimated cost for the project is $5.4 billion, and it is projected to open after the Ontario Line has been completed.

==== Future plans ====
Previous plans called for a second, eastward extension of Line 5 to the University of Toronto Scarborough campus, though this has since been replaced with plans for a separate Eglinton East LRT (EELRT), formerly known as the Scarborough Malvern LRT.

An extension of Line 5 Eglinton north beyond Renforth station is also planned to connect the line to Toronto Pearson International Airport. Two infill stops are proposed: Convair Drive (at grade) and Silver Dart Drive (elevated).

Metrolinx is studying an extension of Line 4 Sheppard, to replace the former Sheppard East LRT project, which would likely connect with the Line 2 Bloor–Danforth extension at McCowan Road and Sheppard Avenue, as well as extension westwards to add another connection to Line 1 at Sheppard West station.

An inactive proposal for light rail transit running along Jane Street as the Jane LRT has also been proposed.

=== Streetcars ===
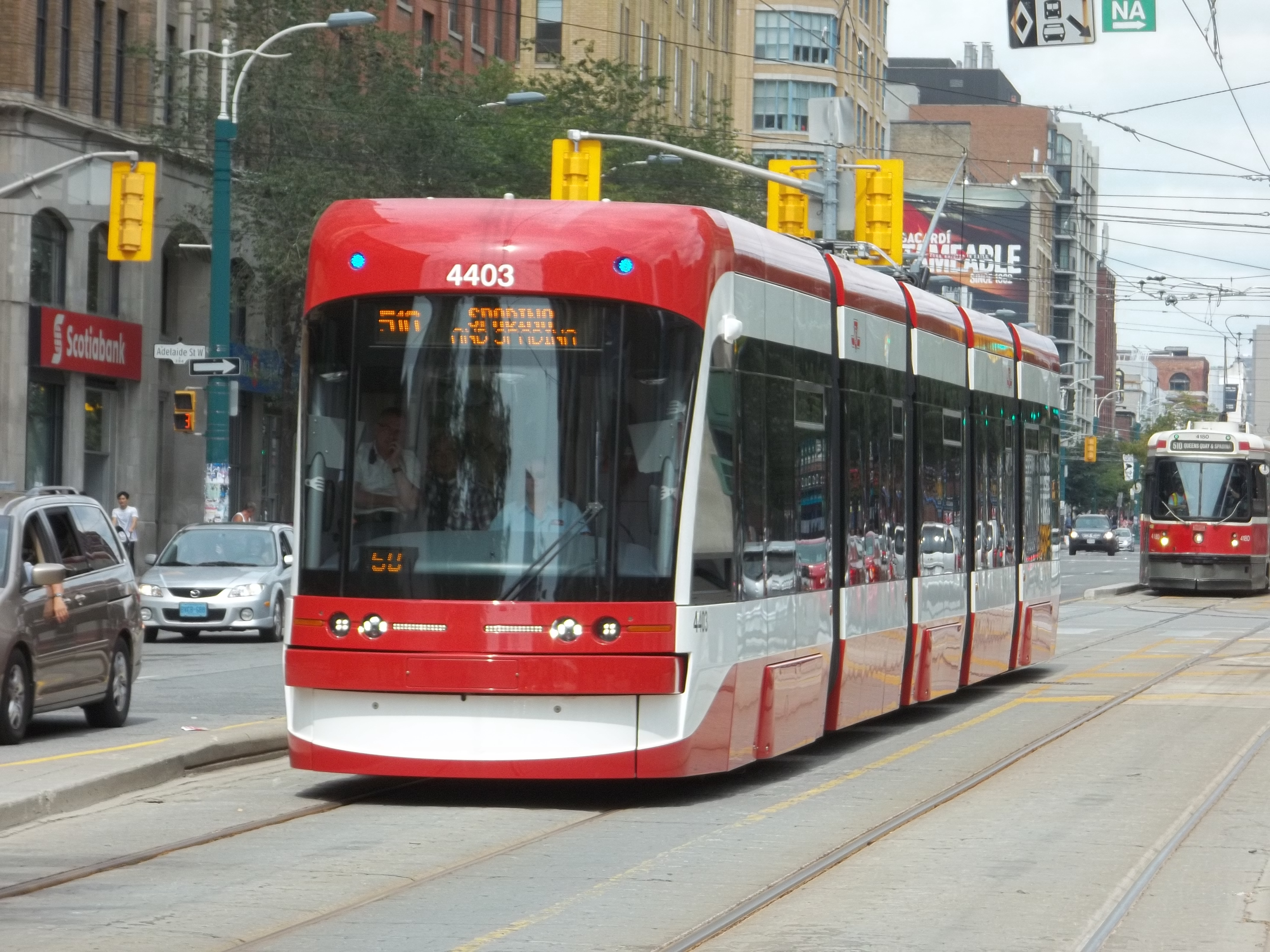
Flexity Outlook in 2014

Toronto's streetcar system is one of the few in North America still operating along street-running tracks. It has been operating since the mid-19th century. Horsecar service started in 1861, and 600 V DC overhead electric service began in 1892. New TTC routes since the 1940s have generally been operated by other modes of transportation, and the less busy streetcar routes have also been converted. Streetcar routes are now focused on the downtown area, although two run farther from the core: one being on St. Clair Avenue, 6 kilometres (3.7 mi) from Lake Ontario on average, served by the 512 St. Clair streetcar route, and another on Lake Shore Boulevard (the western portion of 501 Queen), which runs through the Etobicoke district nearly to the city limits with Mississauga at Etobicoke Creek in Long Branch.

Up until 1995, the TTC operated a fleet of 765 PCC-type streetcars, 540 of which it purchased new. The rest were purchased as other cities sold their PCC streetcar fleets.

From 1987 until September 2019, the TTC operated two-car Articulated Light Rail Vehicle (ALRV) streetcars, a longer version of the Canadian Light Rail Vehicle (CLRV) streetcars.

Following the retirement of the TTC's CLRV streetcars on December 29, 2019, the entire TTC streetcar fleet consists of the low-floor Flexity Outlook vehicles from Bombardier Transportation, the first of which entered service on the 510 Spadina route on August 31, 2014.

The TTC has also proposed a new streetcar extension east of Union, serving the eastern waterfront area. Starting at Union station, the new route would run down the waterfront before going north to Distillery Loop. It would then proceed to run on Ookwemin Minising and end on a looped section of track.

=== Wheel-Trans ===
A Wheel-Trans Ram ProMaster CS-2 Minibus in 2026

Toronto has operated a paratransit system, known as Wheel-Trans, since 1975. Wheel-Trans provides door-to-door accessible transit service for people are unable to use conventional transit services for all or part of the trip. In 2025, Wheel-Trans recorded 4,076,389 trips made by 47,121 passengers. The TTC operates a fleet of 276 accessible buses, and through contracts with taxi services, 360 accessible taxis and 1,800 sedan taxis.

The Metropolitan Toronto Social Services and Housing Committee began work on a public paratransit system in 1973 and launched Wheel-Trans in 1975. Toronto's system was born from the activism of Beryl Potter and the Trans-Action Coalition, which lobbied local Toronto governments for transit accessibility.

== Services ==
=== Fares ===
Since March 1, 2015, children 12 and under have been able to ride the TTC for free year-round. As of June 2, 2025, the TTC's fare payment system consists of cash fares, Presto cards and Presto tickets. Customers also have the option to pay the equivalent of the adult single-ride TTC Presto card fare prices by tapping a contactless credit or debit card on TTC Presto fare readers. Since April 3, 2023, the adult cash fare and single-ride Presto tickets has been $3.35 for a single trip. Since April 3, 2023, the cost of adult single fares using a Presto card has been $3.30. The Fair Pass program allows those eligible for the Ontario Disability Support Program (ODSP) or Ontario Works to receive a discount when using a Presto card.

As of September 1, 2026, the TTC's monthly fare capping program allows riders using their Presto card, credit card or debit card to pay only 47 TTC fares in a calendar month and then receive free travel for the remainder of the month offering similar benefits as a TTC monthly pass provides without the upfront cost.

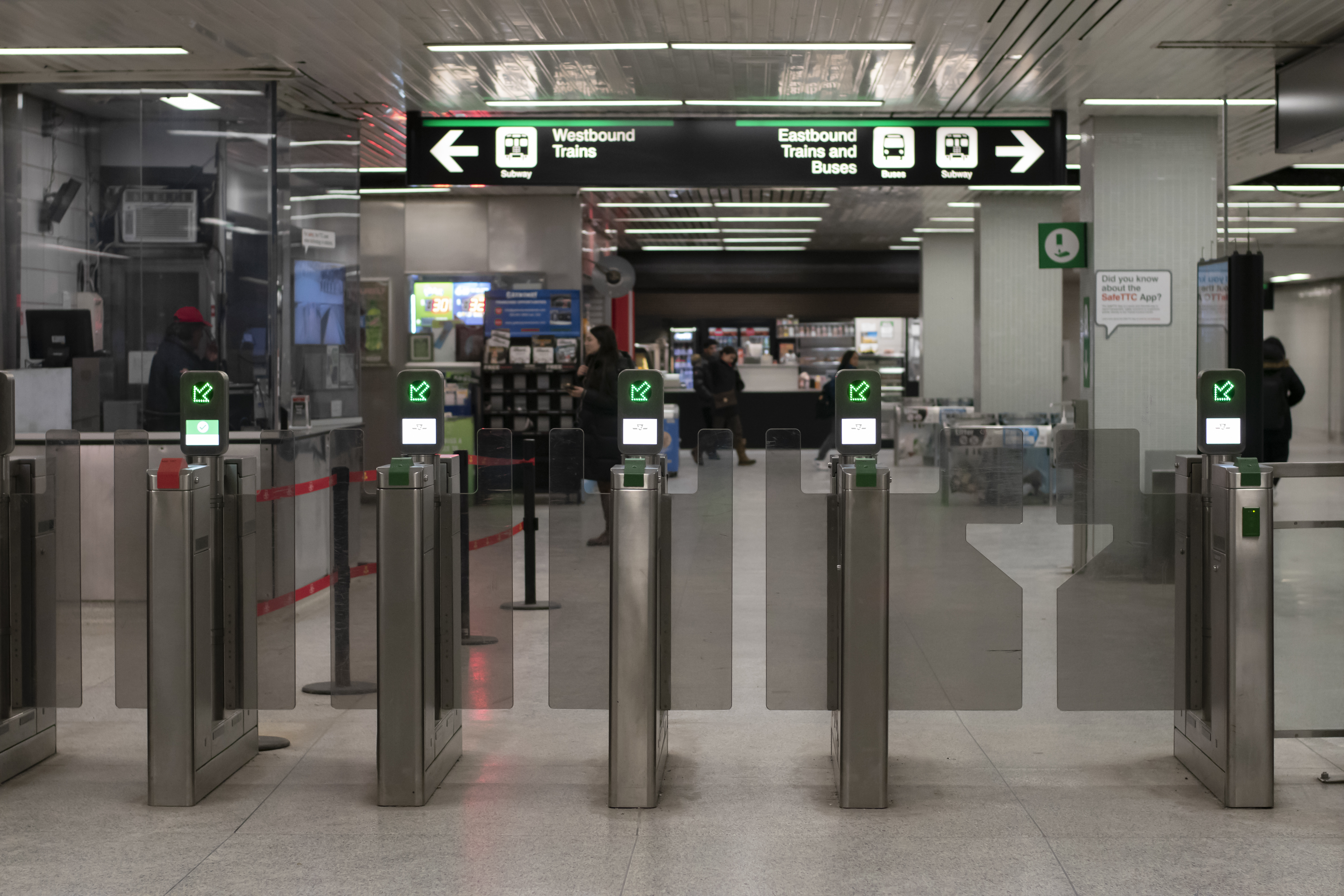
Paddle-style fare gates at Toronto subway stations are equipped with Presto readers, as seen in Victoria Park station in 2023.

The Presto card is an electronic unified contactless smart card–based fare payment system, owned and managed by Metrolinx, for use across the TTC transit network, along with several other transit service providers throughout the Greater Toronto and Hamilton Area (GTHA) including the Metrolinx-owned GO Transit, Union Pearson Express services and on OC Transpo in Ottawa. The TTC also provides limited-use paper Presto tickets, mainly for occasional riders, which come in 1-ride, 2-ride and day pass varieties. Users tap their Presto card or ticket on a Presto reader as they enter a TTC station or vehicle. Either their fare is automatically paid through stored value or validates the TTC's two-hour Presto transfer or TTC transit pass. Their card or ticket then acts as proof-of-payment (POP) to present to TTC staff such as fare inspectors, who carry hand-held devices to verify Presto fare payments, upon request. As of June 2018, Presto readers are available at the entrances of all subway stations and on all buses and streetcars.

Unlike the Presto card, Presto tickets can only be used on TTC services (subway and surface vehicles within the City of Toronto). They are not reloadable and cannot be used on any other transit service providers that use Presto.

=== Schedules and route information ===
On December 15, 2008, the TTC launched a new next vehicle arrival system (NVAS) to indicate the time of arrival of the next vehicle along a given route. All TTC streetcars have been upgraded with Global Positioning System (GPS) receivers and now operate with NVIS.

Real-time route information can be accessed from the NVAS from the City of Toronto Open Data initiative via SMS by texting the stop number displayed on the bus/streetcar stop pole, or with an app that uses NVAS data.

Route information can also be accessed by phone. Individual route schedules are available online.

Additional TTC information is circulated by "What's On" and "Rocket Rider / TTC Customer News" pamphlets on some vehicles. Information can be accessed in person at the TTC head office (Davisville station at 1900 Yonge Street), as well as at a TTC Info Centre, which opened in 2018, at Union station. Twitter users can communicate with TTCHelps for inquiries.

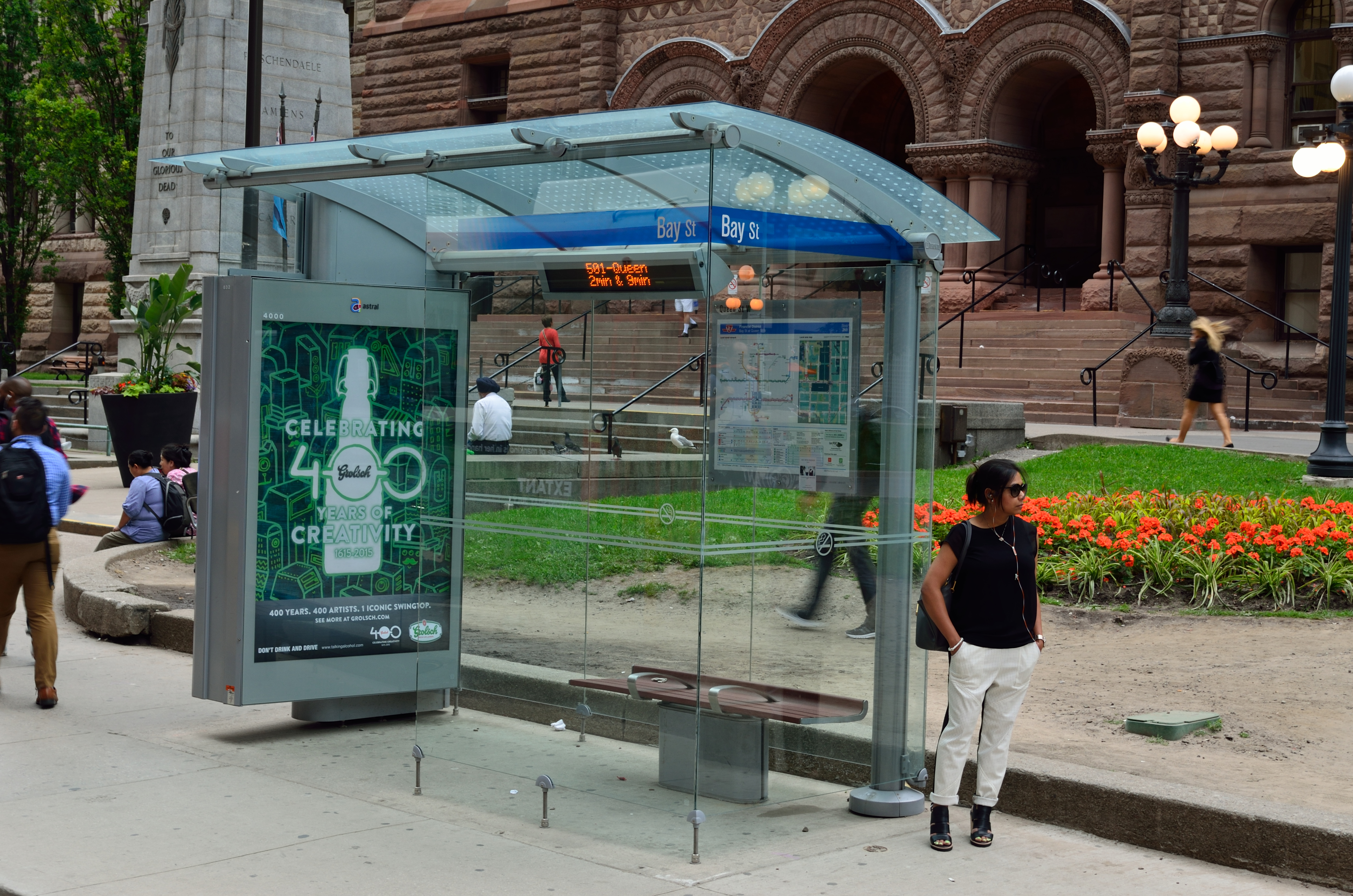
Some TTC shelters are equipped with displays that show when the next bus or streetcar will arrive, such as this one for 501 Queen.

Most subway stations are equipped with OneStop media screens that display the time until the next train, and other information. The next vehicle feature is available on LCD screens in all stations. Since mid-2011, all buses and streetcars have had the tracking feature enabled, accessible free online and by SMS for commuters.

On February 3, 2010, the TTC launched an online trip planner, which allows commuters to plan their routes and transfers on the TTC's website. However, since its launch, the trip planner has remained in beta mode with many bugs remaining to be fixed. In October 2010, the TTC integrated its trip planner with Google Maps. Transit information in Toronto has been available in Apple Maps since the release of iOS 9 in September 2015, when Apple Inc. first launched support for public transit data.

=== Connecting transit ===
==== Connecting GTA transit agencies ====
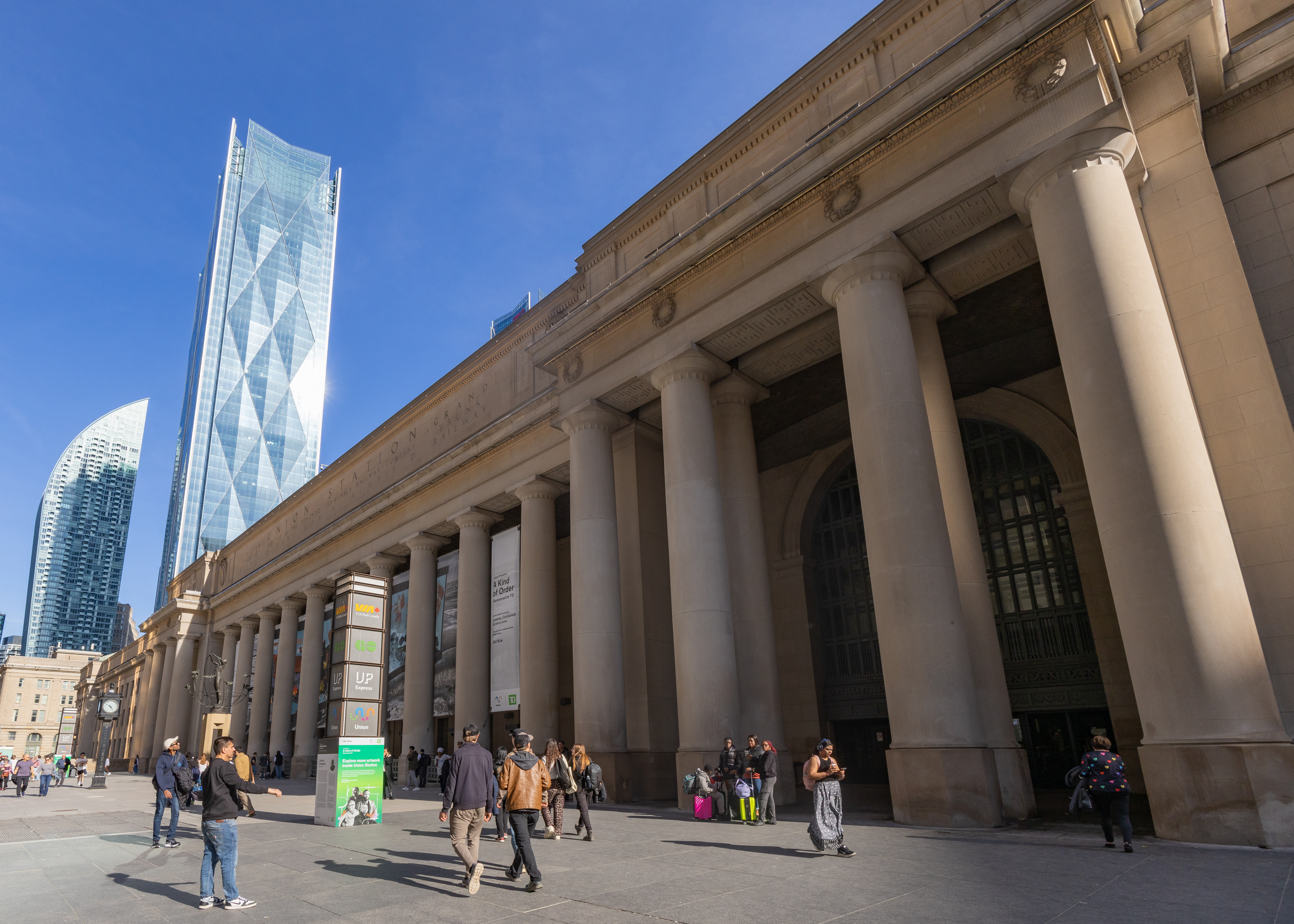
Union Station serves as an intermodal transportation hub for Toronto. TTC passengers may connect to intercity bus and rail services at this station.

The TTC connects with other transit systems of the Greater Toronto Area. GO Transit, Union Pearson Express, MiWay, York Region Transit (YRT), Brampton Transit, and Durham Region Transit (DRT) are connected to the TTC via some of Toronto's subway stations, GO Transit's commuter rail stations, and other hubs like Toronto Pearson International Airport. In addition to Union Station, there are six other stations where the TTC subway network and GO Transit commuter rail lines intersect.

Some bus routes of the surrounding local transit agencies run on Toronto streets along with TTC buses, mainly to reach TTC subway stations. Examples of this include YRT buses travelling on Yonge Street en route to Finch Bus Terminal, MiWay buses travelling on various streets in Etobicoke en route to Kipling Bus Terminal and DRT buses travelling on various streets in Scarborough en route to Scarborough Centre station. However, by law, other local transit agencies are prohibited from carrying passengers wholly within the City of Toronto. Therefore, YRT, DRT and MiWay buses can only drop off passengers inbound and pick up passengers outbound while within Toronto city limits.

Originally, there were no free or discounted transfers between suburban agencies (which still have separate fare structures) and the TTC. But on February 26, 2024, Ontario's One Fare Program, a GTA-wide fare integration program allowing free or discounted transfers between the TTC and other GTA transit systems (within either a two-hour or three-hour window if the trip involves GO Transit), was implemented. However, the policy only applies to fare payments made with Presto, credit, or debit card; customers paying with cash are ineligible to receive free or discounted transfers and are still required to pay a double fare.

==== Connecting inter-city transit agencies ====
Via Rail and Amtrak connect with the TTC at Union Station, while Ontario Northland, Megabus, FlixBus, and US-bound Greyhound intercity coaches connect with the TTC at the Union Station, Scarborough Centre, Highway 407, and Yorkdale bus terminals.

=== Cellular and Wi-Fi connectivity ===
The communication system used by surface vehicles is called the Communications and Information System. It was piloted in the 1970s, implemented in 1991, and is now deployed on all TTC surface vehicles.

==== Subway wireless services ====
From 2013 to 2024, the TTC provided Wi-Fi access in subway stations through its TConnect service.

In August 2023, Rogers implemented 5G wireless service at all the TTC's downtown stations and within the tunnels between them.

In September 2023, the federal government imposed new licence conditions requiring that cellphone and data services be available on the entire subway network by the end of 2026 and that all mobile wireless carriers, including Telus and Bell, have access to it.

As of September 2023, all downtown subway stations and some west-end stations, as well as the tunnels connecting them, had Rogers 5G wireless service. The service is available to customers of Rogers and Freedom Mobile; however, customers of other carriers (such as Bell and Telus) can make 911 calls. 5G wireless service is available between Bloor–Yonge and Dupont stations on Line 1, and between Castle Frank and Keele stations on Line 2. The stations and tunnels between Vaughan Metropolitan Centre station and Sheppard West station on Line 1 have a non-5G service.

In December 2024, the TTC announced the discontinuation of the TConnect service on December 27, 2024, due to low usage.

=== Accessibility ===
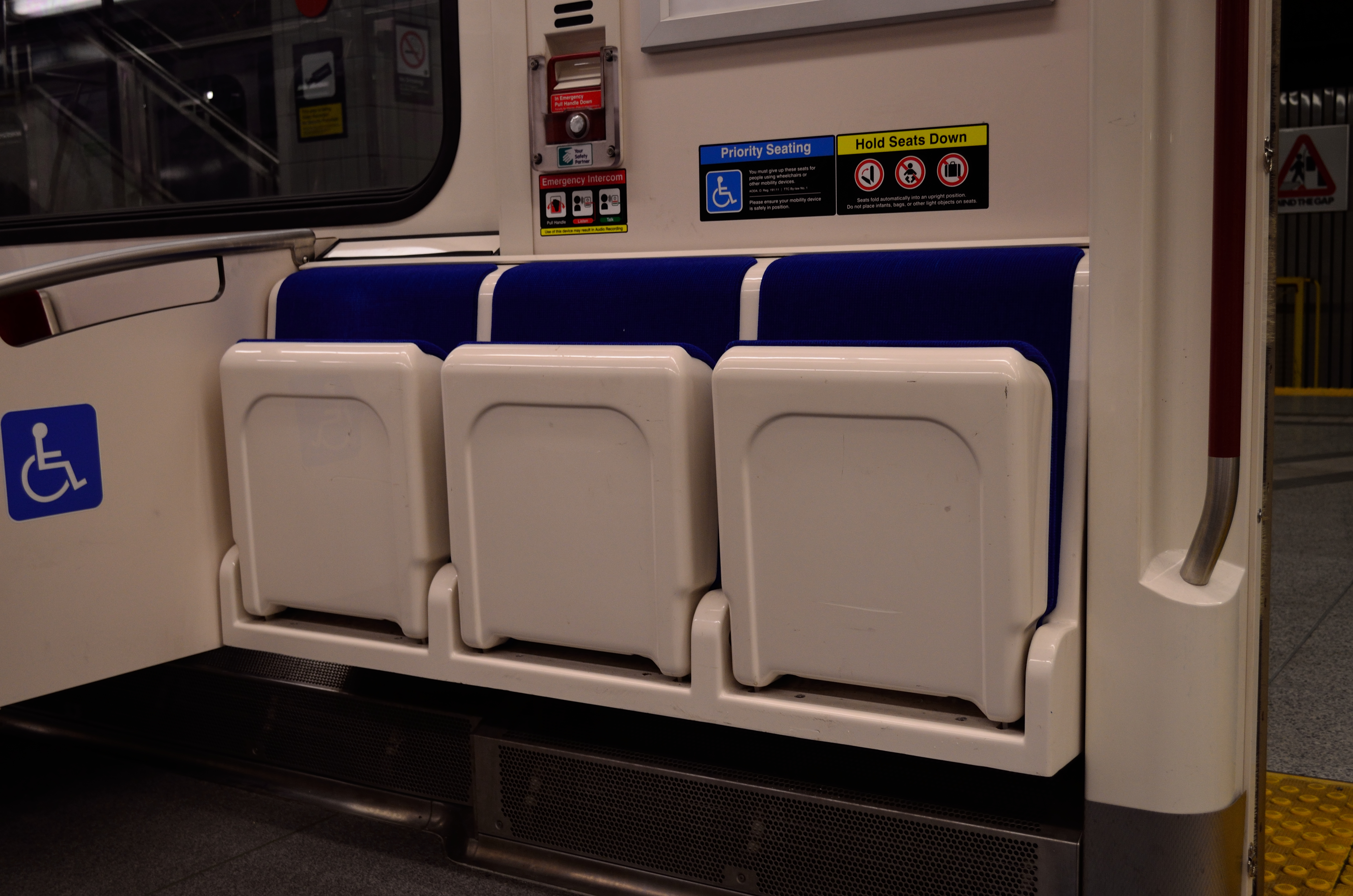
The accessible area on a Toronto Rocket subway train features automatic folding seats.

The Wheel-Trans door-to-door service has been available since 1975. Starting in the 1990s, the TTC focused on providing accessible services on conventional bus routes and the subway system. 56 of the 75 stations on Lines 1 and 2 are wheelchair accessible and are equipped with elevators, and all stations on Lines 4, 5 and 6 are fully accessible. In December 2011, all bus routes became accessible with the retirement of the commission's last inaccessible buses.

Starting in the 2010s, attention to accessibility was expanded to encompass the streetcar system. On August 31, 2014, the commission launched its new fleet of low-floor Bombardier Flexity Outlook streetcars. With the decommissioning of the last of the CLRV and ALRV streetcars on December 29, 2019, all TTC streetcar routes are now served by low-floor streetcars, making all TTC vehicles accessible.

As per Accessibility for Ontarians with Disabilities Act (AODA) guidelines, all surface vehicles and subway trains have been equipped with the on-board automatic next stop announcement system since February 2008. It operates over speakers indicating the next stop. A digital display on TTC revenue service vehicles (except on Line 2 Bloor–Danforth) shows the name of the upcoming streets and stations as the vehicle progresses on its route.

All TTC revenue service vehicles are equipped with external speakers that play automated announcements of the route and destination of vehicle travel starting in 2015 on some buses and 2016 on subways.

== Infrastructure ==
=== Stations, stops and terminals ===
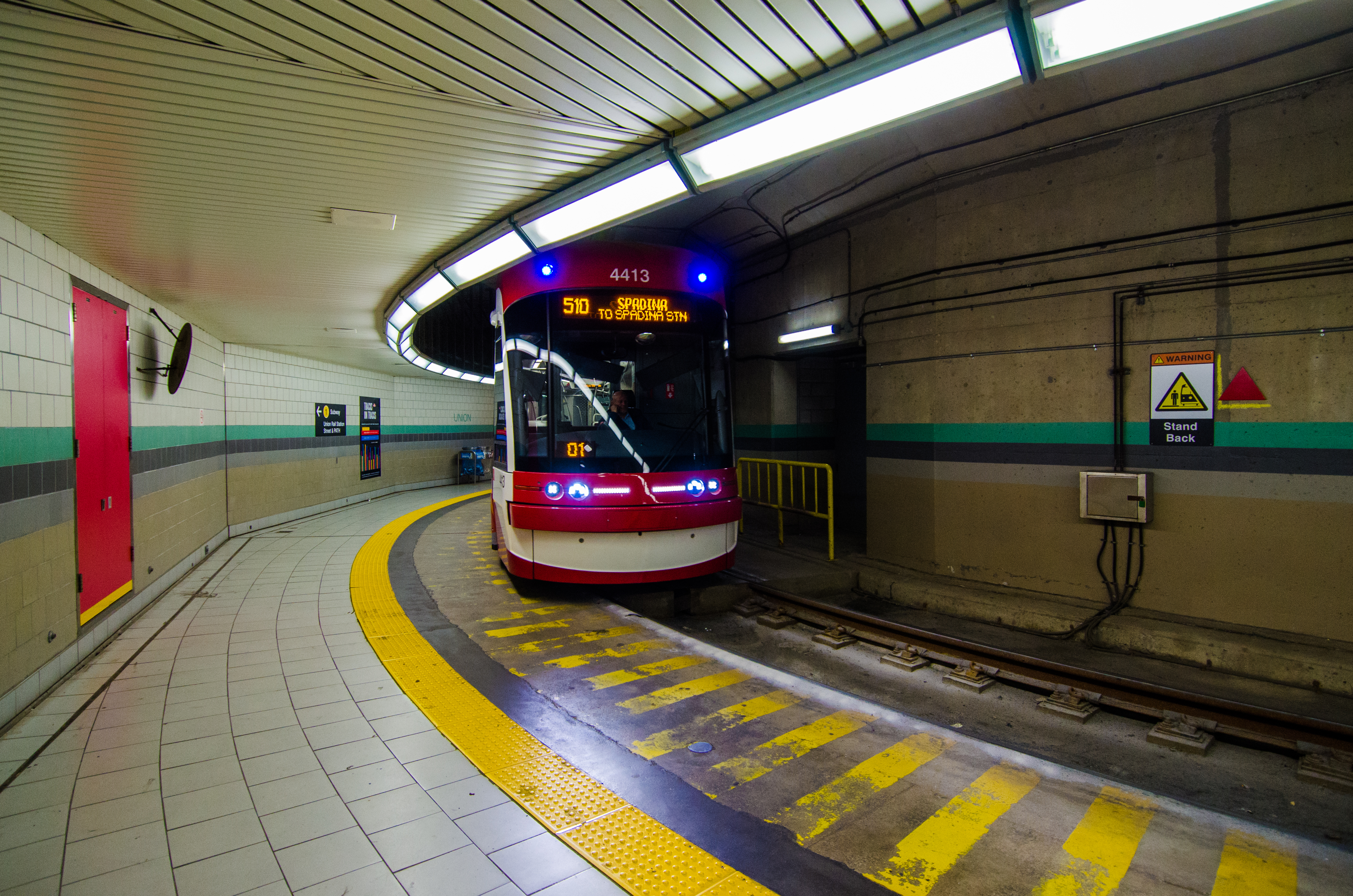
510 Spadina streetcar at Union station loop

Most TTC surface routes terminate at loops, side streets, or subway stations. The TTC is one of the few mass transit systems in Canada where many surface routes can be accessed inside a paid-fare zone common to other routes or subway lines. This feature allows boarding via the rear doors at terminals, reduces the usage of paper transfers, and the need of operators to check for proof-of-payment. However, if people are caught entering fare-paid terminals illegally from the street, they could be fined up to $500 for fare evasion. With the exception of Caledonia, Greenwood, High Park, Jane, Keelesdale, Old Mill, and Runnymede, all subway stations' off-street terminals are within the fare-paid area. In a unique case, Humber College, connections are made at the Humber College Bus Terminal, which is located outside the station and was a pre-existing terminal that served the adjacent Humber Polytechnic north campus prior to the station opening.

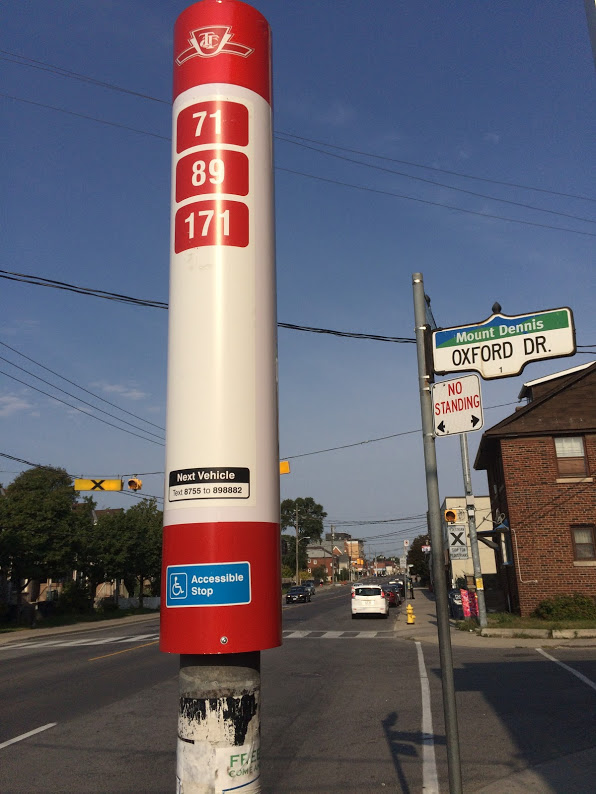
A TTC bus stop pole in Mount Dennis

The shelters in the system are installed and maintained under contracts with Astral Media (later became a part of by Bell Media) (with CBS Outdoor since 2006 and previously Viacom Media) and Toronto Transportation Services. Approximately 4,100 shelters are managed by Toronto Transportation. Some shelters are solar powered and include next vehicle arrival displays.

There are four versions of shelters found in the city:

- Kramer Design Associates Ltd/Cantilevered arch roof – newest version being installed
  - Cantilever arch roof canopy – used on the 512 St. Clair streetcar line
- Contemporary or Barrel vault dome roof – some by Daytech and installed by Viacom/CBS are found mostly in suburbs like Scarborough
  - Barrel vault dome canopy – select stations with streetcar platforms
- Traditional flat top – older version in Old Toronto and variants in Etobicoke
  - High Capacity Traditional – used on 510 Spadina streetcar line
- Classic shelters – oldest version without advertisements and found mostly in the suburbs outside of Toronto's pre-1998 limits

As of December 2025, there are 11 sets (men's and women's) of public washrooms located on the TTC system, all at subway stations that are major transfer points, at the ends of subway lines, or former ends of subway lines. All (with the exception of Highway 407 and Vaughan Metropolitan Centre stations, which only connect with regional buses) are located within the fare paid area and thus available only to TTC passengers.

=== Headquarters and facilities ===
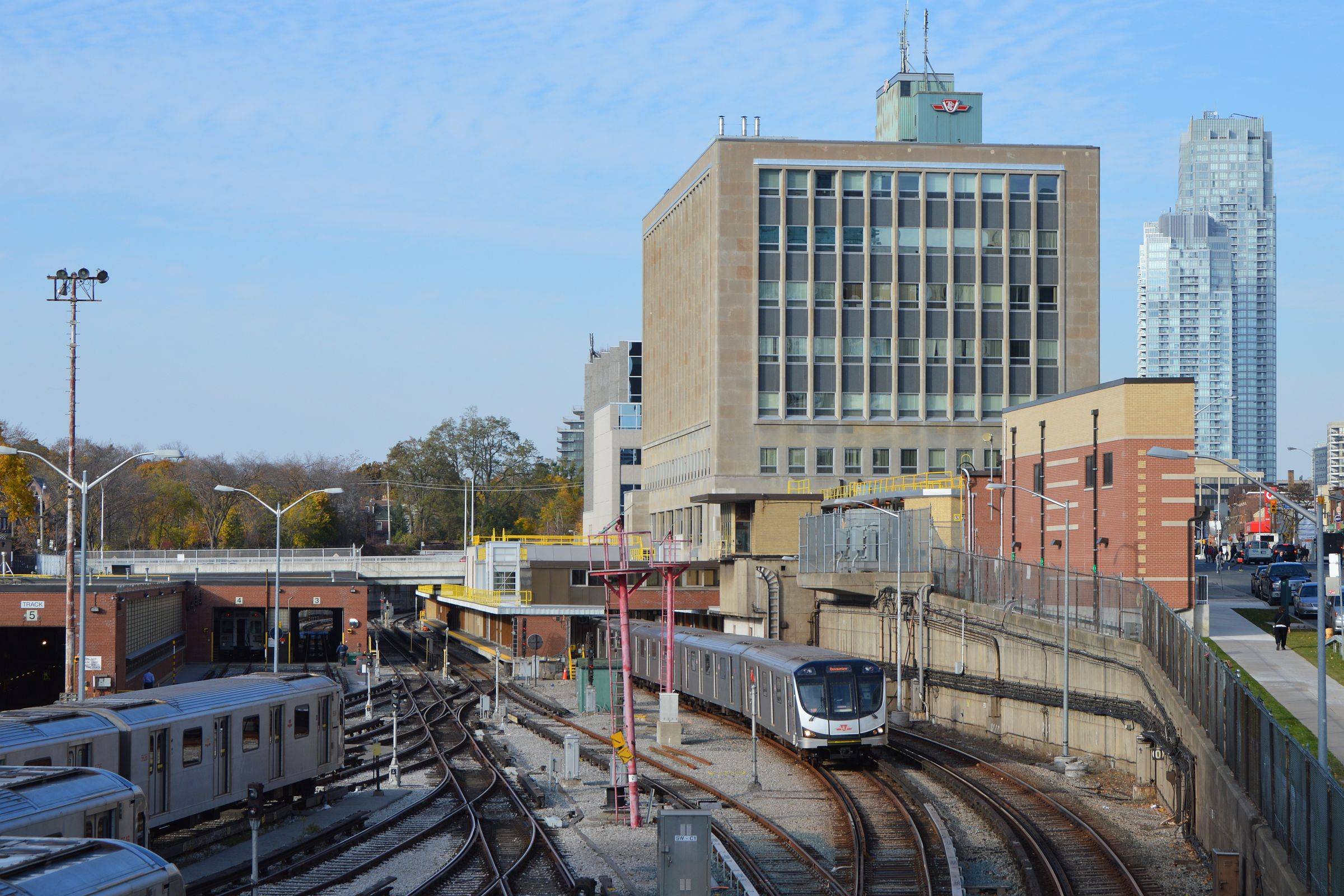
The TTC head office, the William McBrien Building, above Davisville station and next to Davisville Yard, a maintenance facility for subways

TTC buses and streetcars are operated out of a number of garages and carhouses located around the city and are serviced at several other facilities. The surface routes are divided into several divisions. Individual divisions have a manager, an on-duty mobile supervisor, a CIS communications centre, and a garage facility tasked with managing the division's vehicle fleet and routes.

The TTC's head office is in the William McBrien Building, located at 1900 Yonge Street at Davisville Avenue, which opened in 1957. The Davisville station bus terminal occupies part of the building's ground floor. The previous TTC headquarters was at Yonge and Front Streets in the Toronto Board of Trade Building, which was later demolished.

There are plans to relocate the head office to a yet-to-be-built site at 4050 Yonge Street near York Mills Road. The site is a commuter parking lot with a TTC entrance to York Mills station. Build Toronto is charged with helping the commission relocate, but it is facing political opposition from many mayoral candidates.

=== Commuter parking lots ===
The Toronto Parking Authority on behalf of the TTC operates 30 commuter parking lots, all at subway stations, with a total of 13,981 parking spaces. Effective April 1, 2009, it eliminated free parking for Metropass holders. All passengers using parking facilities during peak hours must pay for the service since then. The rates vary by location from $2.00 to $7.00 between 5:00 a.m. and 3:00 p.m. on weekdays, with lots offering discounted or free parking at other times. Most TTC-owned lots are open (uncovered) parking lots; certain lots are located in covered garages, such as the Yorkdale lot, which is located in the namesake shopping centre's underground parking garage.

== Safety ==
=== Safety programs ===
Safety features provided by the TTC include:

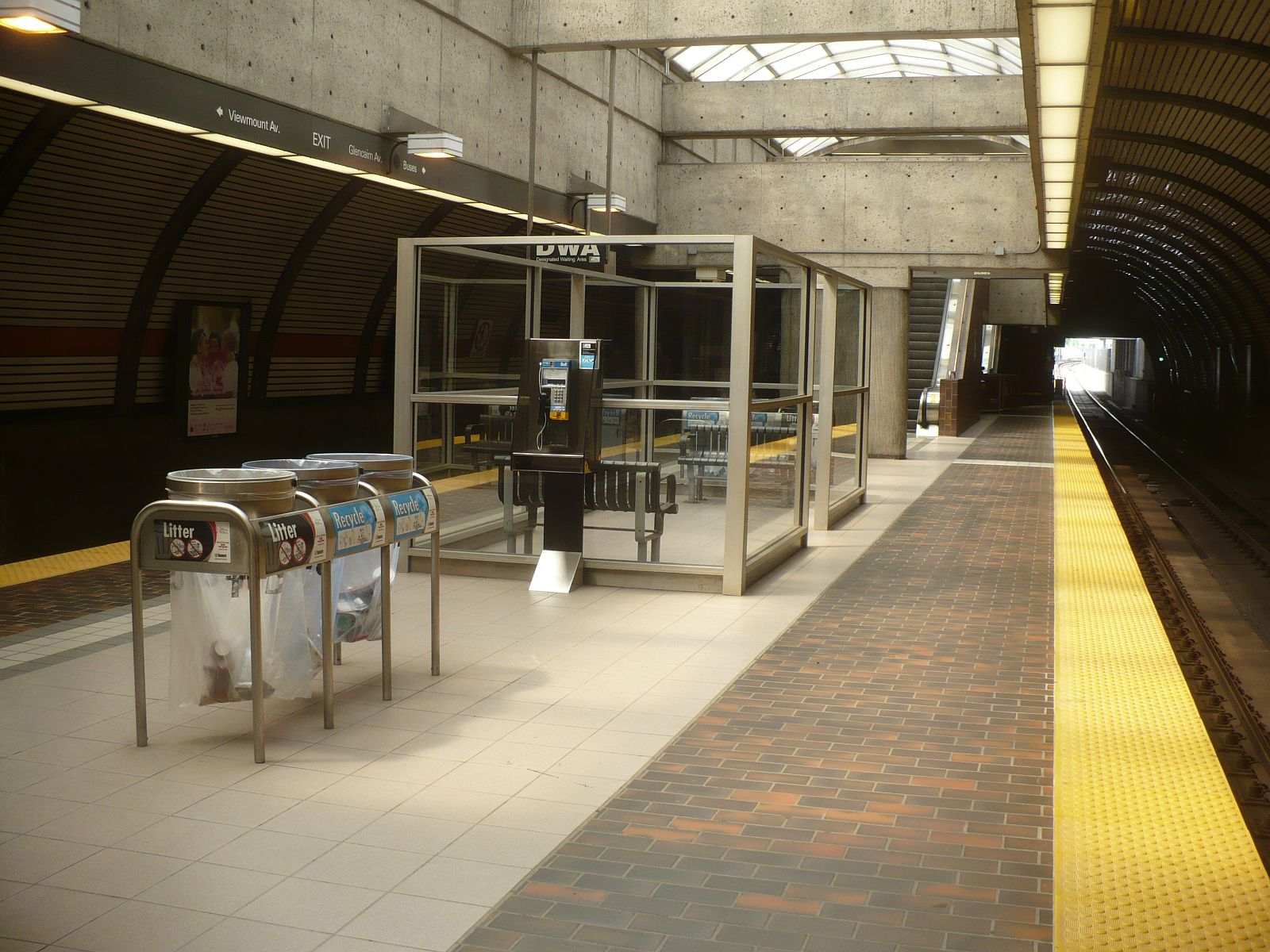
A designated waiting area (DWA) at Glencairn station in 2014. DWAs are well-lit waiting areas that are monitored, have intercoms, and are situated near the location where the guard car stops.

- Request stop: all passengers travelling alone on TTC buses can ask the driver to stop at points between bus stops. The program started in 1991, due in part to the activities of serial rapist and killer Paul Bernardo. On October 13, 2011, after many requests from the public and, finally, a letter by LGBTQ+ rights group Queer Ontario, the TTC announced that it would make the Request Stop Program available to all passengers in need; from 1991 to 2011, the program was only available to women.
- Designated waiting areas (DWA) on rapid transit platforms: these are well-lit, have intercoms, are monitored by security cameras, and are near the location where the guard car stops.
- Toronto paramedics: stationed at key locations within the subway system during the morning and evening rush to assist with medical emergencies and provide a faster emergency response. This also reduces delays on the rapid transit system.
- Emergency power cut stations: indicated by a blue beacon and located on both ends of all rapid transit platforms with a PAX telephone that can be used contact the Transit Control Centre's emergency line (3555).
- Yellow emergency alarm (formerly "Passenger Assistance Alarm"): yellow strips on all subway cars since 1977; they have also been installed on the Flexity Outlook streetcars as well as on Line 5 Eglinton and Line 6 Finch West vehicles.
- Emergency stopping mechanisms (passenger/guard emergency valve or PGEV): on the T1 trains on Line 2 Bloor–Danforth.
- The Toronto Rocket trains on Line 1 Yonge–University and Line 4 Sheppard, the Flexity Outlook streetcars, and the Line 5 Eglinton and Line 6 Finch West trains use a two-way intercom for passenger communication with the train crew.
- Approximately 12,000 cameras monitoring activities at TTC stations, on buses, streetcars, and Toronto subway trains.
- Underground alert messages: displayed on the subway platform video screens to notify passengers about criminals
- TTC Transit Enforcement Unit: consisting of fare inspectors and special constables

==== Crisis Link ====
In June 2011, the TTC announced a new suicide prevention program called "Crisis Link" aimed at people who are in a station and in immediate danger of performing self-harm. Special speed dial buttons have been installed on payphones in station Designated Waiting Areas that "link" the caller to a 24-hour crisis counselling service provided by Distress Centres of Toronto. Signage has also been placed in high-risk areas of the station platform directing those at risk to use the service. The program includes 141 speed dial buttons on the system's payphones and 200 posters placed on station platforms.

==== ThisIsWhere initiative and SafeTTC mobile app ====
In September 2017, the TTC created an iOS/iPadOS and Android app called ThisIsWhere that allows users to report harassment and other personal safety incidents to the TTC. The name was later changed to "SafeTTC" and launched on September 6, 2017.

=== Transit Enforcement Unit ===
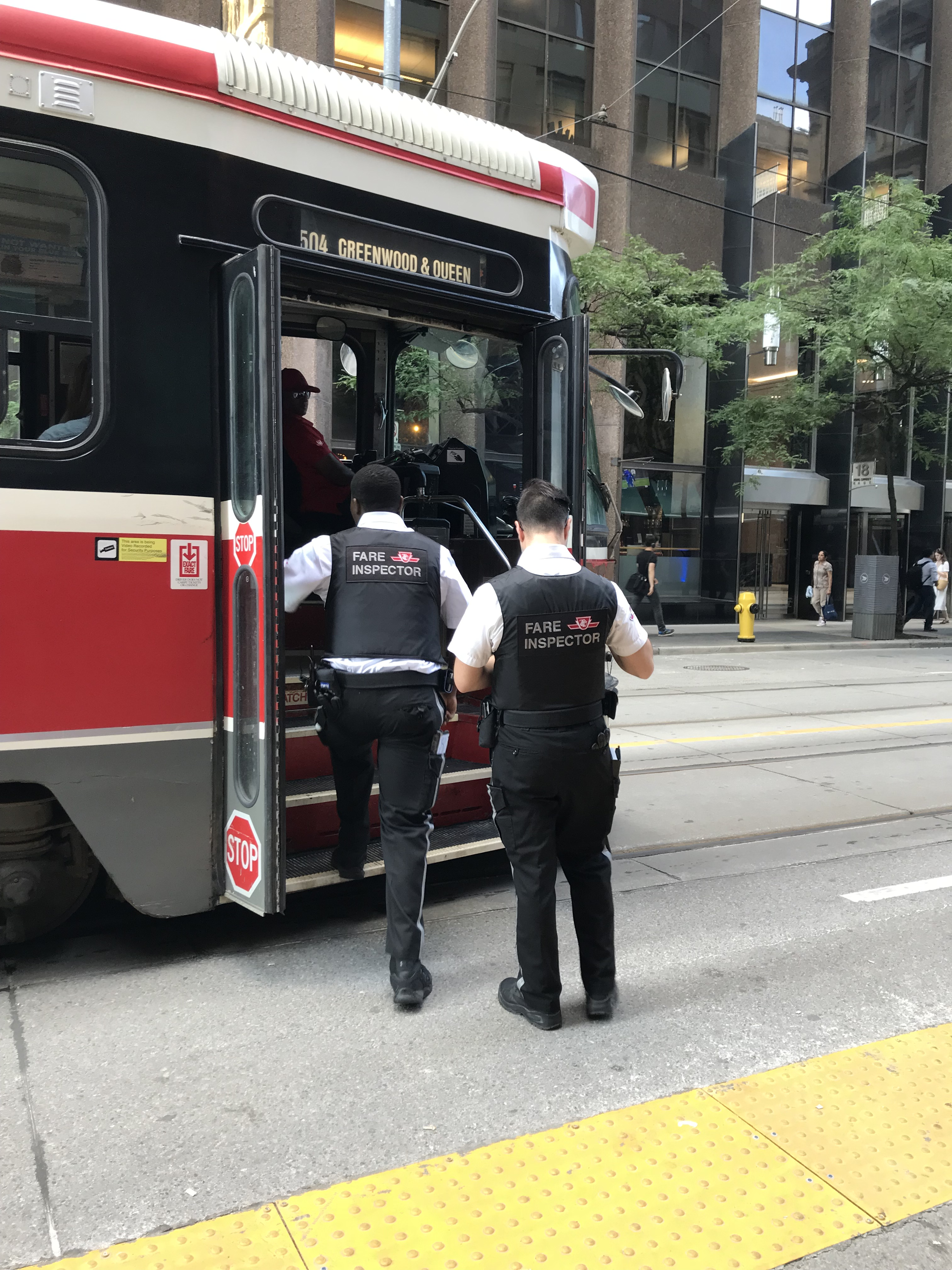
Fare inspectors of the Transit Enforcement Unit board a CLRV streetcar for inspection in 2018.

From 1997 to 2011, the TTC employed special constables, who were responsible for safety and security and had similar policing powers to Toronto Police Service officers. During the phase-out of the special constables, the Toronto Police reinstated its Transit Patrol Unit, which had been cancelled in the mid-1990s. The special constables were replaced by bylaw enforcement officers known as transit enforcement officers, as part of the TTC's Transit Enforcement Unit.

The negotiation between TTC and the Toronto Police Services Board took place in 2013 resulting in restored special constable status and peace officer authority.

There is a difference between special constables and fare inspectors. Fare inspectors have no authority to detain a person, and so it is possible to simply walk away with no repercussions. In contrast, special constables have the same authority as police officers.

==== Bylaws enforced ====
The TTC's By-law No. 1 is a by-law governing the actions of passengers and employees while on Commission property. It can be enforced by a "proper authority" which is defined in the by-law as: "an employee or agent of the TTC wearing a TTC uniform; an employee or agent of the TTC carrying an identification card issued by the TTC; or a municipal police officer." The by-law covers rules regarding fare payment and conduct while in the system. Effective October 12, 2009, a revised version of the by-law has been issued. Revisions include the restriction of placing feet or "any object that may soil" on seats, the prohibition against using offensive language (including via the user-generated displays at Pioneer Village station, which are part of the public art installation LightSpell, although the displays have not yet been activated), and the provision that one must give up their seat to a person with a disability or pregnancy in priority seating areas.

=== Communications ===
The TTC uses three primary voice and data communication systems. The first is the system used by Operations, Security and Maintenance. This system operates on five ultra high frequency (UHF) conventional frequencies. Channels 1, 3, 4 and 5 are used for day-to-day operations, while channel 2 is reserved for the Wheel-Trans service.

The second system, the Communications and Information System (CIS), is used by buses and streetcars, and employs transmission facilities throughout the city. Conceived in the late 1970s and fully implemented in 1991, it consists of a computer unit on board each bus and streetcar called the Transit Radio Unified Microprocessor (TRUMP). This is attached to a transponder receiver, which allows CIS operators to track the location of the vehicle using a computational system known as dead reckoning. The TRUMP unit also allows vehicle and CIS operators to send and receive text messages for such things as short turns and route adjustments. There is also the option of voice-based communication between the vehicle and CIS operators. With the introduction of NextBus technology to provide real-time arrival information, the CIS has been updated to use a combination of GPS data and the previous dead reckoning (signpost-based) system. If internally managed TTC communications are unavailable, the TRUMP unit operates on Bell Mobility's CDMA network to communicate with divisional operations and transit control.

In 2012, the TTC began research into transitioning from the outdated and antiquated CIS to a newer computer-aided dispatch (CAD) system. Utilizing this technology would help improve headways, provide more reliable communications and allow divisional supervisors to locate vehicles in real time (the current GPS system only sends location updates every 20 seconds). Implementation of the system, later named the Vehicle Information System & Integrated Operations Network (VISION), began in 2016, with the contract for associated equipment awarded to Clever Devices ULC. After extensive testing, deployment of VISION on vehicles in revenue service began in the summer of 2018, with plans to fully equip the entire bus and streetcar fleet by 2019.

The third system, known as the "wayside system", consists of UHF MPT-1327 Trunking radio sets used by the three heavy-rail subway lines. They replaced older devices which communicated by the third rail, and are divided into separate systems representing their respective subway lines. This trunking system allows Transit Control to communicate directly with a single train, a zone encompassing several trains, or the entire line. (Line 3 Scarborough uses a single channel UHF system, much the same as the system used by operations staff.)

All of these systems can be monitored by a scanner capable of the UHF Low band (406–430 MHz). Numeric codes—often referring to people or positions (299 Bloor – Subway Line mechanic at Bloor)—are also announced through the radio and the overhead paging system. The TTC also has several "Plans" ("Plan A" through "Plan G") that are used in emergencies but are not announced on the PA system and only referred to on the radio.

==== OneStop media system ====
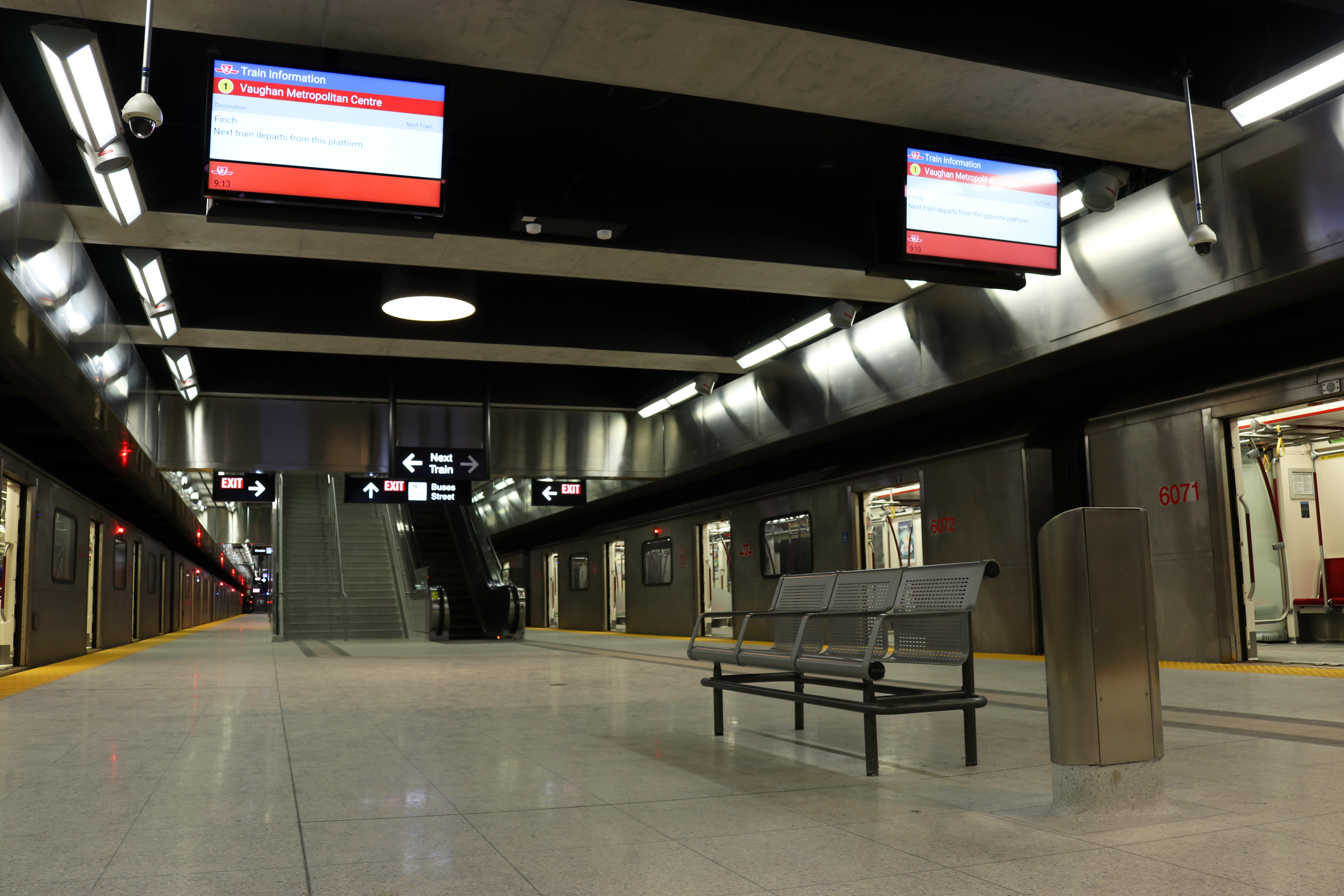
Large LCD television screens that display the news and updates for TTC services are installed in most subway stations, such as Vaughan Metropolitan Centre station.

The TTC, in partnership with Pattison OneStop (formerly OneStop Media Group), have installed large LCD television screens in most subway stations throughout the system except on Line 5 Eglinton and Line 6 Finch West. The new media system replaced the old "Subway Online" system, which was decommissioned.

The signs feature third-party advertising, news headlines and weather information. From its inception in 2005 until December 31, 2017, the news feed and advertising for television programs were supplied under a contract with Bell Media's 24-hour local cable television news service, CP24. Since January 1, 2018, the service has been provided by Global Television Network's Toronto television station CIII-DT 41, which is owned by Corus Entertainment. The signs also provide TTC-specific information regarding service changes and delays, information pertaining to using the system, and Toronto Police alerts about suspects. The system can also be used when an Amber alert is issued, which also may include announcements via the PA system.

In September 2008, TMU station (then known as Dundas station) was the first to feature a "next train" announcement integrated into the signage. The system has been expanded to many other stations since its initial rollout. Since mid-July 2009, the majority of stations have been equipped with this service and since January 2018 – coinciding with a content provider switch from CP24 to Global News – the next train arrival time notices were also updated to provide the line number and the destination of the next train. While Line 5 and 6 stations have screens that display the arrival times for the next two or three trains, they display neither news nor weather headlines provided by Global News.

== Governance ==
As an agency of the City of Toronto, the City has full authority over the TTC's mandate and structure. The TTC is responsible to Toronto City Council through its board, composed of members of council and citizens, led by the chair.

=== Constituting legislation ===
The Municipality of Metropolitan Toronto Act established the Toronto Transit Commission to succeed the Toronto Transportation Commission in 1954. When the City of Toronto Act was last updated in 2006, the TTC was continued under the updated act. Toronto Municipal Code, chapter 279 stipulates additional fiscal and policy requirements for the TTC, as well as sets out the requirements for the TTC board. The TTC itself regulates the use of its system via TTC By-law No. 1, the most current revision being the 2009 revision.

=== Board and chair ===
The TTC board consists of ten members: six Toronto City Council members and four citizens. The citizen members are nominated through an independent public process by the Civic Appointments committee. The mayor of Toronto appoints the chair of the TTC, currently Jamaal Myers. The chair must be a member of Toronto City Council. The board elects a vice-chair from among its members.

List of chairs of the TTC
Chair	From	Until
Philip W. Ellis	1921	1929
Frederick L. Hubbard	1929	1930
William C. McBrien	1931	1932
S.J. McMaster	1932	1933
William C. McBrien	1933	1954
William G. Russell	1954	1955
Allan A. Lamport	1955	1959
Charles A. Walton	January 3, 1959	1960
Clarence C. Downey	1960	1963
Ralph C. Day	February 12, 1963	June 27, 1972
Franklin I. Young	July 5, 1972	May 28, 1973
Karl L. Mallette	August 14, 1973	January 21, 1975
G. Gordon Hurlburt	January 21, 1975	March 31, 1979
Julian Porter	May 15, 1979	1987
Jeffrey S. Lyons	1987	1989
Lois Griffin	1989	1991
Michael Colle	1991	1994
Paul Christie	1994	1998
Howard Moscoe	1998	2000
Brian Ashton	2000	2002
Betty Disero	2002	2003
Howard Moscoe	2003	2006
Adam Giambrone	December 1, 2006	December 1, 2010
Karen Stintz	December 1, 2010	February 19, 2014
Maria Augimeri	February 19, 2014	November 30, 2014
Josh Colle	December 1, 2014	December 13, 2018
Jaye Robinson	December 13, 2018	November 24, 2022
Jon Burnside	November 24, 2022	August 8, 2023
Jamaal Myers	August 8, 2023	Incumbent

== Management and personnel ==
The TTC has more than 12,000 employees. Most are operators, but the commission also employs supervisors, custodians and a wide range of skilled tradespeople who work on vehicles and critical subway and surface infrastructure.

The day-to-day operations of the TTC are managed by the chief executive officer (formerly the chief general manager or CGM). Mandeep Lali was appointed CEO in June 2025, after the departure of Rick Leary at the end of August 2024; Leary had succeeded Andy Byford in January 2018.

=== Executive personnel ===
- Mandeep Lali, CEO
- Fortunato Monaco, chief operating officer

=== Station managers ===
In 2013, the TTC assigned group station managers on most subway lines and hired an additional manager upon the opening of the Line 1 extension to Vaughan:

- Lines 1 Yonge–University and 4 Sheppard
  - Finch to St. Clair on Line 1 and Line 4
  - St. Andrew to Summerhill
  - Yorkdale to Osgoode
  - Vaughan Metropolitan Centre to Wilson
- Lines 2 Bloor–Danforth and formerly 3 Scarborough
  - Broadview to Kennedy on Line 2 and Line 3 (until Line 3's closure in July 2023)
  - Castle Frank to Spadina
  - Bathurst to Kipling

=== Labour relations ===
Unionized workers of the TTC workers have performed strike actions numerous times since 1952. At the request of Mayor Rob Ford and Toronto City Council, on March 30, 2011, the Province of Ontario passed legislation classifying the TTC an essential service, which removed the employees' right to strike. On May 8, 2023, a Superior Court judge overturned the designation on the basis that the TTC did not meet the judicial definition of an "essential service" and therefore the restrictions on striking were unconstitutional.

==== 2024 averted strike ====
A TTC strike was set to begin on June 7, 2024, at 12:01 a.m. if a deal between the TTC and the Amalgamated Transit Union Local 113 was not reached. The previous April, union members had voted overwhelmingly in favour of strike action if necessary, after their previous collective agreement expired at the end of March 2024. However, the TTC and the union reached a tentative agreement at approximately 11:30 p.m. on June 6, 2024, and so the strike was averted.

The key issues for the union and its members related to job security, protections against contracting out jobs, and improvements in benefits for active members and pensioners. The president of the Amalgamated Transit Union Local 113, Marvin Alfred, confirmed the next morning that a tentative agreement had been reached late the night before and that talks had continued until almost 4 a.m. "What we have right now is a deal", he said. "We have something signed, but we're still preparing and making sure we can have something tangible for our membership," he told CBC Radio's Metro Morning.

==== Workplace safety ====
In 2022, TTC employees were surveyed by their union as part of Transit Worker Assault Awareness Day. 73 percent of those surveyed (out of approximately 3,100 people) reported experiencing workplace violence. In March 2023, Jennifer McKelvie, the deputy mayor of Toronto, requested section 269.01 of the Criminal Code be amended to include assault against transit workers.

=== 2018 benefits fraud investigation ===
In 2018, as a result of their involvement in a health insurance scam involving Healthy Fit, an orthotics shop, 223 employees were dismissed or forced to retire early, while ten faced criminal charges.

== Subsidiaries ==
Beside the main transit operations, the TTC has subsidiaries:

- TTC Insurance Company Ltd. — deals with insurance risks from operations; established 1994
- Toronto Transit Infrastructure Ltd. — provides advisory services on infrastructure projects
- Toronto Coach Terminal Inc. — handled the operations of the Toronto Coach Terminal, which was closed in 2021

== See also ==
- List of metro systems
- Transportation in Toronto
- Transport in Ontario
