= Julian Porter =

Julian Harris Porter
- Born: December 4, 1936 (age 89); Toronto, Ontario, Canada
- Spouse: Anna Porter
- Relatives: Dana Porter, father

Julian Harris Porter, KC (born December 4, 1936), is a Canadian lawyer and was Chairman of the Toronto Transit Commission from 1979 to 1987.

== Background ==
Porter was born December 4, 1936, to Dorothy (nee Ramsay) and Dana Porter. His father was a Canadian lawyer and former Attorney General of Ontario. After graduating from the University of Toronto Schools, he studied at the University of Toronto, and the Osgoode Hall Law School. He was called to the bar in 1964 and appointed Queen's Counsel in 1975. He is married to the publisher Anna Porter.

== Public service ==
Porter was appointed as a Commissioner to the Toronto Transit Commission Board in 1977 and elected Chairman in 1979, following the resignation of G. Gordon Hurlburt. He was Chairman of the TTC until 1987.

Prior to joining the TTC, Porter was President of the Canadian National Exhibition. He was the youngest person to hold that position to that time. He represented Canada at the UNESCO World Conference on Copyright in Paris and was a Director of Toronto Life magazine, the Cancer Research Foundation and Harbourfront Centre in Toronto, Ontario.

Porter has been a Director of the Stratford Festival.

== Law practice ==
Subsequent to his tenure on the TTC, Porter has continued practising law, and is recognized by the Law Society of Upper Canada as a specialist in civil litigation. He has been a sole practitioner since 2000, and has given numerous lectures to the Law Society of Upper Canada, the Canadian Bar Association, and libel lawyers. He is the co-author of the legal text, Canadian Libel Practice. He has also been a Bencher of the Law Society of Upper Canada since 1999.

He is a fellow of the American College of Trial Lawyers, and has received an honorary LL.D from Queen's University.

In 2019, Prime Minister Justin Trudeau retained Porter as his counsel for a libel action against Opposition Leader Andrew Scheer, for comments Scheer made over the SNC-Lavalin affair.

== Politics ==
Porter was the candidate for the Progressive Conservative party in the 1985 Ontario provincial election in the St. David riding, the same riding formerly represented by his father in the Ontario Legislature. Porter ran against his personal friend Ian Scott who was the Liberal candidate. Scott won the contest and would serve as Attorney General of Ontario in the government of David Peterson.

Political offices
Preceded by G. Gordon Hurlburt	Chairman of the Toronto Transit Commission; 1979-1987	Succeeded by Jeff Lyons
