= Mandeep Lali =

British transportation executive

Chief Executive Officer of the Toronto Transit Commission
- Incumbent
- Assumed office July 7, 2025
- Preceded by: Rick Leary; Greg Percy (interim)

Mandeep S. Lali is British public transportation executive who has been the chief executive officer (CEO) of the Toronto Transit Commission (TTC) since 2025. Prior to joining the TTC, Lali was vice president and chief operating officer for subways at New York City Transit (NYCT), and held senior roles at Transport for London (TfL).

== Career ==
=== London and New York ===
Lali began his career working for Transport for London in London, England, holding a number of progressively senior roles over 13 years. He joined OTIS elevators, where he worked for nearly seven years as an executive director, including on the Crossrail project with TfL. Lali went on to work for the Metropolitan Transportation Authority (MTA) in the United States, where he was vice president and chief operating officer for subways at New York City Transit for three years.

=== Toronto Transit Commission ===
In May 2025, the Toronto Star reported that Lali had been hired as CEO of the TTC. The TTC formally announced his appointment on June 5 at a press conference in Scarborough Centre Station, where Lali joined TTC Chair Jamaal Myers and Mayor Olivia Chow. He began as CEO on July 7, replacing Greg Percy, who was appointed interim CEO following the resignation of Rick Leary in 2024.

Civic offices
Preceded by Rick Leary; Greg Percy (interim)	Chief Executive Officer of the Toronto Transit Commission; 2025–present	Succeeded by Incumbent
