= Franklin I. Young =

Canadian aviator (1909–1973)

Franklin Inglee Young (August 7, 1909–October 11, 1973) was a Canadian pilot and pioneer of early aviation in Canada.

He was born and educated in Toronto, Ontario. In 1927, he began flying with Elliot Air Service Hamilton, Ontario and barnstormed on a trans-Canada tour, then later piloted with such charter companies as Aircraft Limited, Century Airways, and National Air Transport until 1932.

In 1933 he joined Dominion Skyways at Rouyn, Quebec as a bush pilot and accepted a job as a pilot for Trans-Canada Air Lines (TCA) in 1937.

During World War II he acted in a key role with TCA's Atlantic Ocean ferrying operations.

Young flew several inaugural continental and transcontinental flights while with TCA/Air Canada and also acted as a check pilot for Americans applying to fly with Trans-Atlantic Ferry Command.

Later in his career, Young became general manager of operations for the line's eastern Canada region, playing a major role in shortening the flight path of TCA aircraft on the transcontinental route along what is now known as the Great Lakes Airway. He retired in 1970.

Young was then appointed to the Toronto Transit Commission in 1970 and was elected Chairman by his fellow Commissioners in 1972, following the retirement of Ralph Day.

Young was a member of the TTC during the critical period when the TTC voted to retain streetcars in Toronto, which led to the rebuilding of 173 PCC streetcars and the development of the Canadian Light Rail Vehicle as the new streetcar for Toronto.

Young died in Toronto on October 11, 1973 and was inducted into Canada's Aviation Hall of Fame in 1974.

"His aviation knowledge, applied to pilots of Canada's national airline during its formative years, and as an instrument flight instructor of RCAF pilots, provided an increased safety factor for both civilian passengers and military aircrew alike and substantially benefited Canadian aviation."

Preceded by Ralph Day	Chairman of the Toronto Transit Commission; 1972-1973	Succeeded by Karl L. Mallette
