= Anna Porter =

Canadian publisher and novelist

- Born: Anna Maria Szigethy; Budapest, Hungary
- Education: University of Canterbury
- Occupations: Publisher, writer
- Spouse: Julian Porter

Anna Maria Porter OC OOnt is a Canadian publisher and novelist.

== Life and career ==
Born Anna Szigethy in Budapest, Hungary, she emigrated to New Zealand in 1956. She received a bachelor's degree and Master of Arts degree from the University of Canterbury. She started at McClelland & Stewart in 1969 and became president and publisher of Seal Books. In 1979, she founded Key Porter Books and in 1986 she purchased a majority stake in Doubleday Canada.

In 2004, she was appointed to the Board of Governors of York University.

In 1991, she was made an Officer of the Order of Canada for being "instrumental in bringing Canadian titles to the attention of the international market place". In 2003, she was awarded the Order of Ontario. She has been awarded honorary degrees from Ryerson University, St. Mary's University, and the Law Society of Upper Canada.

In 2004, Porter sold her interest in Key Porter Books to focus on writing. She has published three mystery novels and three books on Middle European history. Her most recent book is The Ghosts of Europe, published in September, 2010.

She is married to the lawyer Julian Porter.

== Selected works ==
- Farewell to the 70's: a Canadian salute to a confusing decade (1979)
- Hidden Agenda (1985)
- Mortal Sins (1987)
- The Bookfair Murders (1997)
- The Storyteller: memory, secrets, magic and lies (2000)
- Kasztner's Train: the true story of an unknown hero of the Holocaust (2007)
- The Ghosts of Europe: journeys through central Europe's troubled past and uncertain future (2010)
- Buying a Better World: George Soros and billionaire philanthropy (2015, Dundurn Press)
- The Appraisal (2017)
- In Other Words: How I Fell in Love with Canada One Book at a Time (2018)

== Awards and honours ==
- 2007: Nereus Writers' Trust Non-Fiction Prize, winner, Kasztner's Train
- 2008: Charles Taylor Prize, shortlist, Kasztner's Train
- 2010: Shaughnessy Cohen Prize for Political Writing, winner, The Ghosts of Europe

== Sources ==
- "Women in the Canadian book trade". Archived from the original on 2006-02-27.
- "York University profile".
- "Women's Post Profile".
