= G. Gordon Hurlburt =

Canadian politician

G. Gordon Hurlburt was a Toronto politician and Toronto Transit Commission Chairman in the 1970s.

He was active in the 1960s and 1970s in local politics. He served as Councillor and Controller in the Borough of North York and was a member of the Metropolitan Toronto Council. He was appointed a TTC Commissioner in 1970, became vice-chairman in 1973, and was chairman from 1975 to 1979.

Preceded by Karl L. Mallette	Chairman of the Toronto Transit Commission; 1975-1979	Succeeded by Julian Porter
