= C. C. Downey =

Canadian lawyer and politician

Clarence Downey
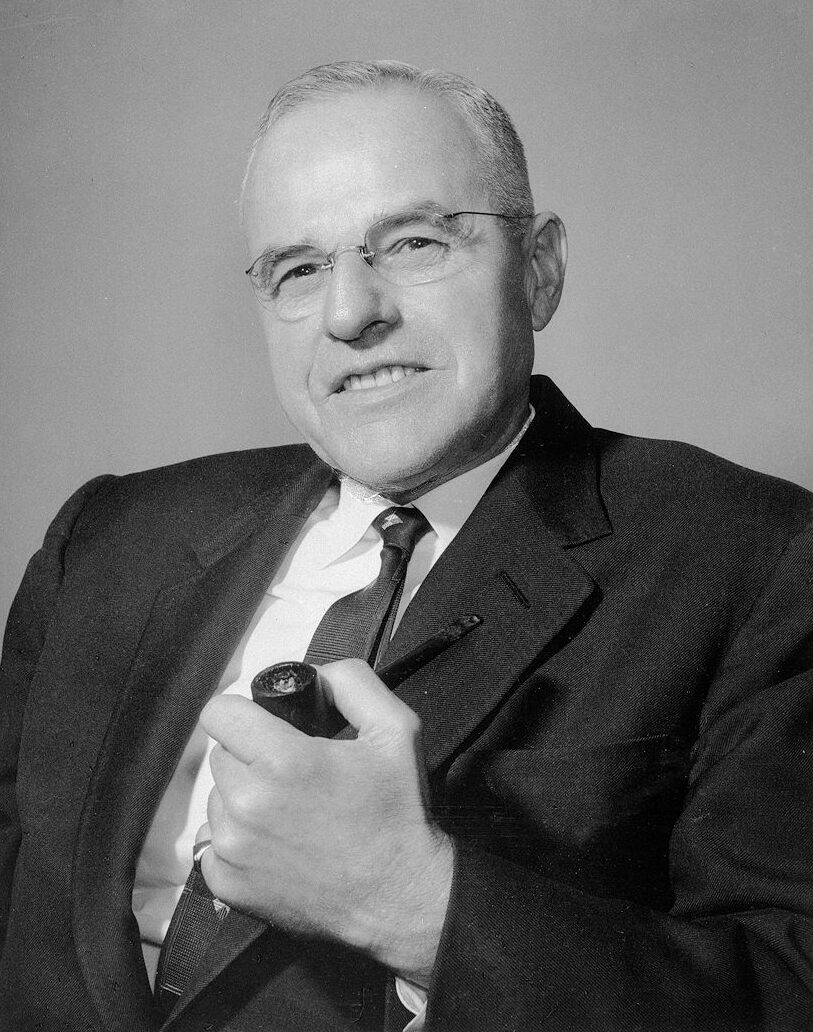
- Downey, c. 1960

Personal details
- Born: Toronto, Ontario, Canada

Clarence C. Downey, QC (1897-June 8, 1982) was a Canadian lawyer and municipal politician in Toronto, Ontario.

He was born in Toronto, Ontario, and was educated at the University of Toronto and Osgoode Hall Law School. He lived in the Toronto suburb of Swansea, and served on the Swansea Village Council from 1928 until 1945, as Councillor, Deputy Reeve, and Reeve. He was the senior partner in the law firm of Downey, Shand and Robertson, and was made a King's Counsel in 1941. He was appointed a TTC Commissioner in 1960, and served as chairman from 1960 to 1963. He remained a Commissioner until 1968.

Preceded by Charles A. Walton	Chairman of the Toronto Transit Commission; 1960–1963	Succeeded by Ralph C. Day
