= Transit Enforcement Unit =

Special constabulary in Ontario, Canada

- Motto: Service, Courtesy, Safety

Agency overview
- Formed: June 1, 1997 (as Special Constable Services); February 1, 2011 (as Transit Enforcement Unit)
- Legal personality: Special constabulary

Jurisdictional structure
- Legal jurisdiction: Property owned or used by the Toronto Transit Commission
- Governing body: Toronto Police Services Board, TTC Board

Operational structure
- Special constables: 101
- Provincial offences officers: 114
- Elected officer responsible: Michael Kerzner, Solicitor General of Ontario
- Agency executive: Nicole Elhers, Head of Special Constable Services

Website
- Official website

Former special constable shoulder flash

The Transit Enforcement Unit (TEU; formerly known as the Special Constable Services Department) is a special constabulary maintained by the Toronto Transit Commission (TTC) in Toronto, Ontario, Canada. First established in 1997, the unit consists of special constables and provincial offences officers, also known as transit fare inspectors or TTC fare inspectors. The unit's special constables have the full powers of a police power on or in relation to TTC property, and, as of 2023, the unit employs 101 special constables out of an authorized complement of 145.

== History ==
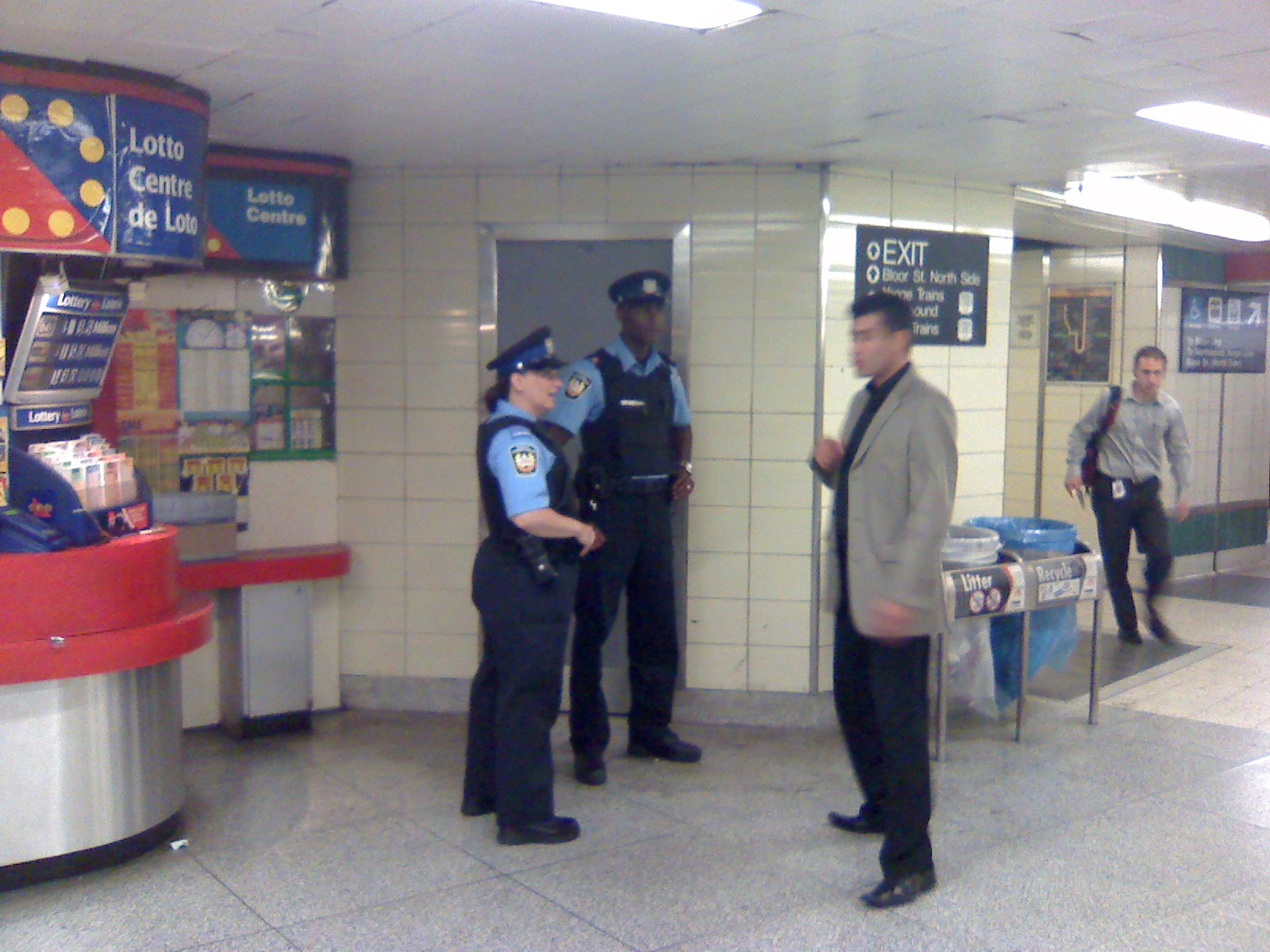
TTC constables in Bloor–Yonge station

Starting in July 1987, the TTC employed staff designated as provincial offences officers, responsible for the enforcement of TTC by-laws, responding to calls for service and protecting TTC employees, customers, and assets. Prior to the creation of the Transit Enforcement Unit, policing on the TTC was limited to patrols by these by-law officers and periodic patrols by the Metropolitan Toronto Police.

The Transit Enforcement Unit was created in June 1997, after the Toronto Police Services Board, with the approval of the Solicitor General, designated the employees responsible for safety and security as special constables under Section 53 of the Police Services Act. The designation was governed by a contractual relationship between the TTC and the Toronto Police Services Board, and empowered the previous by-law officers to make arrests and enjoy the full powers of a police officer while on TTC property.

In the late 2000s, Toronto City Council, which governs but is separate from the Police Services Board, approved a plan to dramatically expand the unit by several hundred special constables with expanded police authority. During subsequent implementation discussions with the Police Services Board, several incidents came to light where individual TTC special constables had overstepped their authority and exercised police powers outside of TTC property, and the board ultimately terminated the TTC's special constabulary. In 2013, the Police Services Board approved then-CEO Andy Byford's plan to restore the agency's special constabulary with slightly fewer powers and an independent complaints process.

In 2014, a former Phoenix Police Department commander, Mark Cousins, was appointed chief special constable of the Transit Enforcement Unit.

In August 2014, fare inspectors were introduced concurrent with the introduction of Flexity low-floor streetcars. All streetcar lines started to use an honour system where passengers pay their fare using electronic fare machines or by using the Presto fare system. TTC fare inspectors would then inspect passengers' fare media while on a vehicle, exiting a vehicle, or at subway stations.

In 2015, fare enforcement officers were equipped with stab vests and updated uniforms but gave up their batons and handcuffs as part of an effort to make the inspectors more customer friendly.

In 2018, the TTC tested the use of plainclothes fare enforcement officers in addition to uniformed officers and special constables.

TTC special constables were among the first responders to the 2018 Toronto van attack, working alongside police and members of the public to secure the scene and provide first aid to victims.

On February 7, 2020, two special constables and a fare inspector arrested a 34-year-old after he refused to provide proof-of-payment while riding a streetcar, provoking a brief fight that resulted in the transit user pleading guilty to two counts of assaulting a peace officer and the two special constables being fired for using "unnecessary" and "unauthorized" force. In the wake of the incident, the City of Toronto ombudsman called for the TTC to reform the unit's "paramilitary" culture.

In 2021, three members of the unit were placed on administrative leave after the TTC ordered an external investigation into allegations of favoritism, harassment, and improper use of the overtime system based on complaints made to the TTC's whistleblower hotline. The investigation turned up no evidence of wrongdoing, and the commission was subsequently sued by the suspended officers, who alleged that they were targeted regarding personal disagreements with TTC CEO Rick Leary, who had wanted to disband the unit.

By the end of February 2025, the TTC again deployed plain-clothed fare inspectors. Both uniformed and plain-clothed inspectors received the same training on how to interact with the public. Initially, plain-clothed inspectors only warned riders who did not pay their fare, but by mid-March they were issuing tickets. Plain-clothed inspectors carry employee and provincial offence officer ID and must identify themselves when interacting with a member of the public.

On March 19, 2017, fare inspections started for bus riders. Inspectors would monitor station bus platforms and check fares for riders exiting buses or entering subway stations.

Effective July 20, 2025, TTC fare inspectors were rebranded as provincial offences officers. On that date, the uniforms were changed to grey shirts and vests labeled "Provincial Offences Officer" on the back. The change stemmed from a 2019 Toronto Auditor General’s report that the system needed to enhance the visibility of staff to enhance fare compliance.

== Organization ==
The Transit Enforcement Unit has four sections:

- Patrol (special constables)
- Provincial offences officers
- System Security (special constables and protective services guards/supervisors)
- Training and Logistical Support (special constables and fare inspectors)

=== Authority ===
==== Special constables ====
Transit enforcement officers (TEOs) are sworn as special constables by the Toronto Police Services Board under the Police Services Act, granting them limited police powers. They have the same powers as a police officer to enforce the Criminal Code, the Controlled Drugs and Substances Act, the Liquor Licence Act, and the Trespass to Property Act.

Specifically, TEOs:

1. have powers and obligations of a peace officer under ss. 495 to 497 of the Criminal Code and subsections 495(3) and 497(3) of that act, apply to the special constable as if they were a peace officer
2. have powers of a police officer for the purposes of ss. 16, and 17 of the Mental Health Act, R.S.O. 1990, c. M.7, as amended
3. have powers of a police officer for the purposes of ss. 31(5), 36(1), 47(1) and (1.1), and 48 of the Liquor Licence Act, R.S.O. 1990, c. L.19, as amended
4. have powers of a police officer for the purposes of ss. 9 of the Trespass to Property Act, R.S.O. 1990, c. T.21, as amended
5. are designated as provincial offences officers for the purposes of enforcement of the Liquor License Act, Trespass to Property Act and TTC By-law No. 1

TEOs are also designated as agents/occupiers of the TTC.

==== Provincial offences officers ====
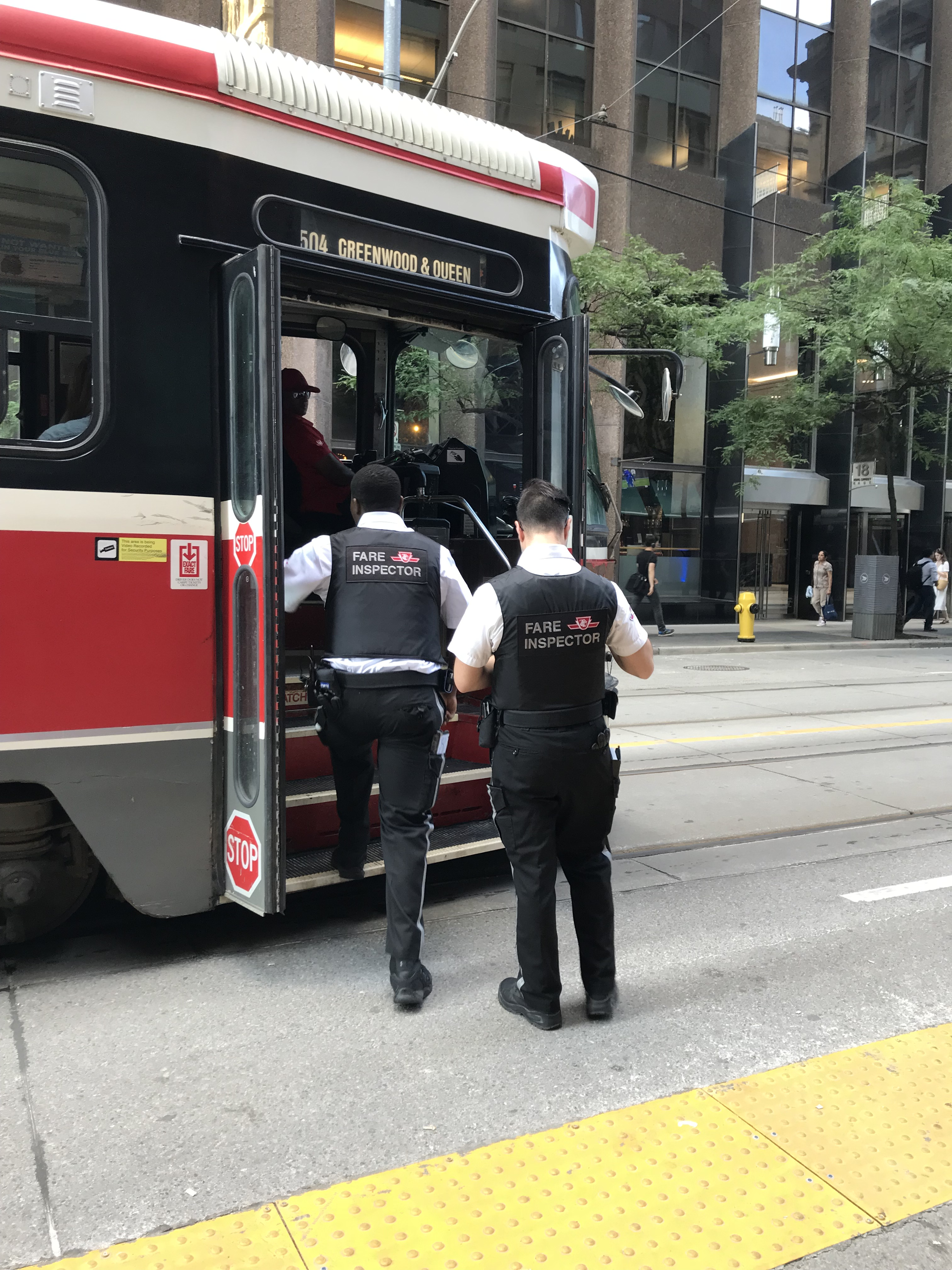
TTC fare inspectors in their former uniforms

Provincial offences officers, formerly known as TTC fare inspectors, enforce TTC By-law No. 1 and the Trespass to Property Act. They are responsible for fare compliance, education, and providing customer service across the TTC system.

=== Rank structure ===
- Special constable (Patrol/Training and Logistical Support)
- Senior special constable (10+ years of service; Patrol/Training and Logistical Support)
- Sergeant (Patrol/Training and Logistical Support)
- Staff sergeant (Patrol / System Security / Training and Logistical Support)
- Chief special constable

==== Other positions ====
- Provincial offences officer (Revenue Protection / TTC POO)
- Protective services guard (PSG)

=== Deployment ===
The Mobile Patrol Division members were the visible presence on TTC surface vehicles while the Subway Patrol Division members were the visible presence in the subway system. They wore uniforms distinct from the standard TTC or Toronto Police uniforms, consisting of a black jacket and powder blue shirt with a special constables crest on both shoulders and black cargo pants. They were armed with batons and OC foam (pepper spray in a less aerosolized form to avoid contamination in confined places), body armour and carried portable radios. Some officers patrolled the subway system on foot, while others drove in marked or unmarked vehicles, responding to calls on surface routes and in the subway.

=== Provincial offences officers and proof-of-payment ===
The Transit Enforcement Unit employs provincial offences officers (formerly known as TTC fare inspectors), who conduct fare inspections and enforce fares on designated proof-of-payment routes (either on board the vehicles, or at terminal or interchange stations). As of March 2025, the TTC employed 114 inspectors.

== Equipment ==
=== Vehicles ===
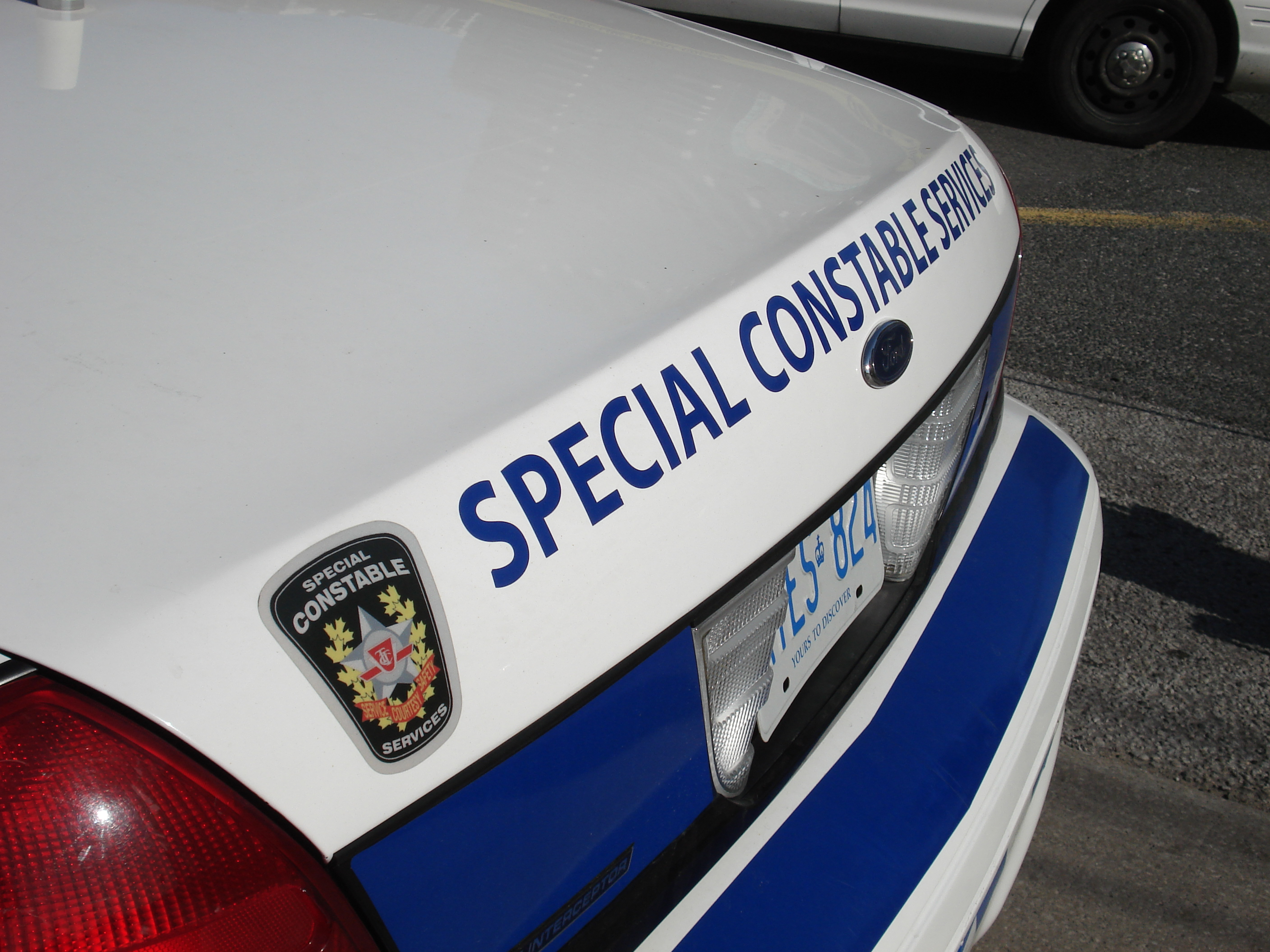
A marked TTC special constable Police Interceptor

- Ford Taurus Police Interceptor with new graphics package
- Ford Police Interceptor – Previously marked; however, all have been converted to unmarked operation
- Various unmarked vehicles for undercover and surveillance operations

== See also ==
- YRT Special Constable Services
