= Toronto Computer Leasing Inquiry =

Corruption inquiry in Toronto, Canada

The Toronto Computer Leasing Inquiry was a judicial inquiry into allegations of conflict of interest, bribery and misappropriation of funds around computer leasing contracts entered into by the City of Toronto government in 1998 and 1999. It was held concurrently with the Toronto External Contracts Inquiry.

== Background ==
On January 1, 1998, the Municipality of Metropolitan Toronto and its six lower-tier cities (Toronto, Scarborough, North York, Etobicoke, East York and York) were amalgamated into the single "megacity" of Toronto. In one of the new city's first official acts of business, computer equipment was leased for city councillors' offices from MFP Financial Services, at a value of $1,093,731. City staff have not been able to produce any documentation to prove that this contract was awarded through proper procedures.

In May, 1999, the city issued a Request For Quotations for its new computer acquisition needs. MFP was one of the bidders, and was awarded the contract in July of that year. MFP was contracted to provide $43 million of computer equipment to the city on a three-year lease agreement. However, the final lease agreement was not signed until after the 90-day price guarantee had expired.

That fall, the city sold its owned computer equipment to MFP, and then leased it back as well.

Over the duration of the agreement, the city paid $85 million to MFP, rather than the original $43 million approved by city council. As well, many of the equipment schedules were for five-year leases rather than three. Some of these leases were later restructured to extend the lease terms even further, resulting in additional costs.

In December of that year, the city acquired 10,000 Oracle database licenses, again through an MFP lease. This turned out to be a serious overestimate of the city's actual needs.

These issues came to light in late 2001, after an investigation by Toronto city councillors David Miller and Bas Balkissoon. In February, 2002, the Toronto Computer Leasing Inquiry was established by city council. The commissioner of the inquiry is Madam Justice Denise Bellamy of the Ontario Superior Court of Justice.

== The Inquiry ==
MFP's lead salesman on the city contract was Dash Domi, the brother of former Toronto Maple Leafs player Tie Domi. Much of the testimony presented to the inquiry alleged an improper financial relationship between Domi and former city councillor Tom Jakobek, the city's budget chief at the time of the contracts.

The inquiry was presented with evidence that Jakobek's name, along with other city staff, was on the passenger manifest for a flight, paid for by MFP, to a Leafs game in Philadelphia. For several weeks, witnesses testified that they could not recall whether Jakobek was actually on the flight, but Jakobek eventually admitted that he had been present, and apologized for lying under oath.

Some of Jakobek's office staff have testified that Dash Domi was granted special access to Jakobek's office, although other staff members have denied this.

The inquiry also investigated possible connections between a $25,000 withdrawal from Domi's bank account on November 1, 1999 and $21,000 in payments on Jakobek's credit card two days later. Witnesses have testified that Domi called Jakobek and then parked for thirteen minutes in the underground parking garage at Toronto City Hall barely minutes after the bank withdrawal, although Jakobek has testified that he was not at city hall at all that day.

Both Dash and Tie Domi testified that the $25,000 withdrawal was a birthday gift for Tie (whose birthday is on November 1), and Jakobek has testified that the $21,000 payment on his credit card came from his father-in-law, former Metro Toronto councillor Ken Morrish, to cover a family trip to Disney World.

A forensic review of Jakobek's financial statements found that only a portion of the money actually came from Morrish, and the remainder in fact came from several family accounts Jakobek controlled, all of which had unexplained patterns of deposits in denominations of $100. This also included $11,000 from Jakobek's grandmother, who has a declared income of less than $15,000 per year.

Members of Jakobek's family testified that the money they deposited in his bank accounts was connected to a real estate investment Jakobek and his brother Joseph made in the 1990s. Due to Joe Jakobek's financial circumstances, the money was being repaid to Tom Jakobek through an arrangement in which the brothers' parents made regular payments to Tom and were subsequently reimbursed by Joe whenever he could afford it. They have also testified that family members, including the grandmother, regularly kept unusually large amounts of money in their homes due to their mistrust of banks.

Ontario Provincial Police launched an investigation in 2005 at the request of the City of Toronto. The OPP decided there are no reasonable grounds to lay any criminal charges.

== Follow-up ==
On October 1, 2002, an additional inquiry was authorized to investigate a related matters regarding other city consulting contracts. The Toronto External Contracts Inquiry convened on October 18, 2004, after the Computer Leasing Inquiry ended.

== Final Report ==
Justice Bellamy released her final report on September 12, 2005. She found that the testimony of Jakobek and Domi was not convincing. She made 241 specific recommendations, which included the following:

- The city should set out its own code of conduct for lobbyists and identify mandatory minimum standards.
- The city should have a gift registry for items received by staff and councillors and the information should be available on a searchable database.
- City staff who leave the public service should not be permitted to become lobbyists for the city for at least 12 months after they leave.
- Politicians who leave office should not be allowed to lobby on matters they worked on.
- The city should expand its current code of conduct for councillors and its conflict of interest policy for staff to include broader ethical considerations.
- Establish a full-time integrity commissioner.
- City staff should have more latitude to speak at council meetings.
- The mayor should report to the public annually on the city's budget, audited financial statements and major contracts or tenders awarded.

In a press conference the same afternoon, Miller (who was later elected the city's mayor) welcomed the findings, and indicated that he would refer the matter to the Ontario Provincial Police for further investigation.

In response to a recommendation that the mayor report one year after the Inquiry's final report on the progress the City is making, Miller submitted a progress report in September 2006.

== No Criminal Charges ==
On March 15, 2010, the Ontario Provincial Police announced that no criminal charges would be laid over the computer leasing scandal.
