= Denise Bellamy =

Canadian judge

Denise Bellamy is a Canadian judge best known for leading an inquiry into a corruption scandal in the City of Toronto government.

Born in Saskatoon, Saskatchewan and raised in Rouyn-Noranda, Quebec, Bellamy obtained a B.A. in Political Science from Carleton University, then obtained her law degree from Osgoode Hall Law School. She was called to the bar in 1980. She subsequently held a number of positions with the government of Ontario in labour and employment law, criminal law, policing and correctional services. She also served as a bencher of the Law Society of Upper Canada for nine years before becoming a judge. She was also president of the Federation of Law Societies of Canada, and vice-president of the Ontario Centre for Advocacy Training.

Madam Justice Bellamy was appointed to the Ontario Superior Court of Justice in April, 1997.

She led the External Contracts Inquiry and Computer Leasing Inquiry. She dismissed appeal motions in the Gold Reserve case.
