= Rick Leary =

American and Canadian civil servant

General Manager of Transit Services (OC Transpo)
- Incumbent
- Assumed office March 27, 2026
- Preceded by: Troy Charter (interim)

Chief Executive Officer of the Toronto Transit Commission
- Incumbent
- Assumed office c. July 2018
- Preceded by: Andy Byford
- Succeeded by: Mandeep Lali; Greg Percy (interim)
- Interim
- In office December 17, 2017 – c. July 2018

Personal details
- Born: 1963 (age 62–63) Boston, Massachusetts, U.S.
- Citizenship: United States; Canada
- Education: Northeastern University (BBA, MPA)

Richard J. Leary is an American-Canadian transportation executive who has been the general manager of Transit Services (OC Transpo) for the City of Ottawa since March 2026. Leary was previously chief executive officer (CEO) of the Toronto Transit Commission (TTC) between 2017 and 2024, general manager of York Region Transit and held senior roles with the Massachusetts Bay Transportation Authority (MBTA).

== Personal life and education ==
Richard J. Leary was born in Boston, Massachusetts. His father was a streetcar operator for the Massachusetts Bay Transportation Authority (MBTA). He graduated from Northeastern University with a BBA and an MPA. As well, he completed a graduate program from Harvard University in Administration and Management.

In August 2019, Leary became a Canadian citizen.

== Transportation career ==
=== Massachusetts Bay Transportation Authority ===
Following his father, Leary began working for the Massachusetts Bay Transportation Authority as a subway attendant in 1984. He then moved through various manager and director roles, becoming the chief operating officer of the MBTA in 2005. He retired from the role in November 2009 after failing to appear at a board meeting to address a damning federal safety report.

=== York Regional Transit ===
In 2009, Leary moved to Canada to become the general manager of York Region Transit in Ontario. Leary was praised as ridership grew by 4 million while customer complaints reduced and vehicle reliability increased.

=== Toronto Transit Commission ===
In 2014, Leary was hired as the chief service officer of the Toronto Transit Commission (TTC) by then-CEO Andy Byford. This role involved management of the TTC's bus and streetcar systems, as well as management of the various Toronto subway stations. Leary's achievements included a large reduction in the number of short turns, improving the quality of service.

In December 2017, Leary was made the interim CEO of the TTC, when his predecessor, Andy Byford left to head the New York City Transit Authority. In July 2018, Leary's interim position was made permanent, following an international search.

In late 2023, TTC Chair Jamaal Myers attempted to have Leary suspended while an investigation into allegations of workplace misconduct took place. The board of the TTC agreed to launch an investigation, but did not suspend Leary.

On June 20, 2024, Leary announced that he would step down from his position as CEO of the TTC at the end of August. Leary noted that it was his decision to leave, having waited to announce his resignation until contract negotiations with Amalgamated Transit Union Local 113 had been agreed. Upon his departure, Leary noted that he had a contract until 2026, with the new mayor, Olivia Chow, and TTC Chair indicating a change in direction for the organization – however Leary reiterated it was his decision to leave the job. Deputy CEO Bruce Macgregor acted as CEO until former Metrolinx executive Gregory W. Percy was named interim CEO while a replacement is sought. Mandeep Lali was later hired as Leary's permanent successor at the TTC in 2025.

=== OC Transpo ===
In March 2026, Leary was selected by the City of Ottawa to be the General Manager of Transit Services (OC Transpo). He replaced interim General Manager Troy Charter who had held the position since the resignation of former General Manager Renée Amilcar in July 2025.

Civic offices
Preceded by Andy Byford	Chief Executive Officer of the Toronto Transit Commission; 2017–2024	Succeeded by Mandeep Lali
