= Urban Transportation Development Corporation =

Canadian rolling stock and rail transport manufacturer

- Type: Subsidiary
- Industry: Rail transport
- Founded: 1970; 56 years ago
- Defunct: February 1992; 34 years ago
- Headquarters: Toronto, Ontario, Canada
- Area served: Worldwide
- Products: Commuter rail coaches Rapid transit vehicles Trams; People movers Military vehicles
- Parent: Government of Ontario (to 1986); Lavalin (1986 – 1991)

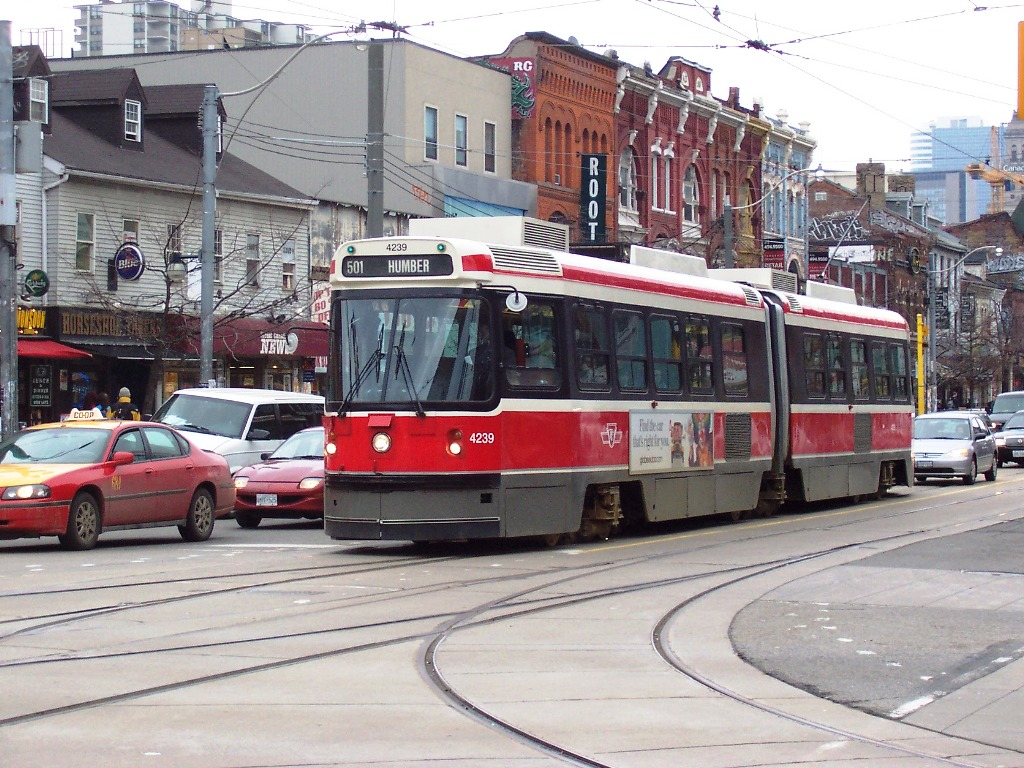
TTC ALRV L3 articulated streetcar #4239 at Queen Street West and Spadina Avenue on the 501, waiting for a light change.

Urban Transportation Development Corporation Limited
- Type: Crown corporation 1973-1986, 1991; Subsidiary 1986-1991
- Industry: Mass transit/railcar manufacturing / military vehicles
- Founded: 1973; 53 years ago as Ontario Transportation Development Corporation
- Defunct: 1991; 35 years ago
- Fate: assets acquired by Lavalin and later Bombardier Inc.
- Successor: Bombardier Transportation
- Headquarters: Toronto, Ontario, Canada
- Products: Railcar, Mass transit cars, Streetcars, military vehicles

The Urban Transportation Development Corporation Ltd. (UTDC) was a Crown corporation owned by the Government of Ontario, Canada. It was established in the 1970s as a way to enter what was then expected to be a burgeoning market in advanced light rail mass transit systems. It developed significant expertise in linear propulsion, steerable trucks and driverless system controls which were integrated into a transit system known as the Intermediate Capacity Transit System (ICTS). It was designed to provide service at rider levels between a traditional subway on the upper end and buses and streetcars on the lower, filling a niche aimed at suburbs that were otherwise expensive to service.

Urban Transportation Development Corporation Ltd. was a holding company. During its time it held several wholly owned subsidiary companies:

- Metro Canada Ltd. was established as the contracting, delivery and operating company for system sales.
- UTDC USA Inc. was the U.S. subsidiary of UTDC, incorporated in Delaware with offices in Detroit, Arlington, Virginia, and Birmingham, Michigan.
- UTDC Services Inc. provided transit service consulting to international clients and worked very closely with the experts from the TTC.
- UTDC Research and Development Ltd. was formed to support the continuing improvement of the group's base technology, and to repurpose it and apply it to different, non-transit markets. Buses that ran on rails, materials handling systems, steerable trucks for freight rail cars and extruded tunnel lining systems were some of the products researched.

The Services and R&D companies were merged in the mid-1980s to form Transportation Technology Ltd.

The Intermediate Capacity Transit System (ICTS) was sold into three markets: the Toronto Transit Commission (TTC) for its Scarborough RT line, Detroit's Detroit People Mover, and Vancouver's SkyTrain system.

Further sales proved more difficult than had been hoped, but in the early 1980s, Hawker Siddeley Canada joined forces with UTDC in order to win a number of contracts with the TTC and Ontario's GO Transit commuter network. They formed a joint operating company at their Canadian Car & Foundry (CC&F) factories in Thunder Bay and Kingston, Ontario: Can-Car Rail built heavy-rail passenger cars, subway cars, streetcars and other vehicles. Now armed with a complete portfolio from light to heavy rail, UTDC had a number of additional successes in North America, and became a major vendor in the mass transit market. It was privatized in 1986, when it was purchased by Lavalin of Quebec. The UTDC factories in Kingston and Thunder Bay continue to produce rapid transit systems for use in Ontario and abroad.

== History ==
=== Genesis ===
Toronto grew extensively during the 1960s and 1970s, and like many cities in North America, most of this growth was in the suburbs. In order to move workers to and from the business and industrial areas in the city centre, an extensive series of expressways was planned, and made its way into the city's Official Plan in 1966. As work on the new highways started, a wave of public protest followed as many houses, and in some cases entire neighbourhoods, were bulldozed to make way. The work became increasingly opposed in Toronto, especially after the cause was taken up by famous urban commentator, Jane Jacobs.

In 1971 Bill Davis won the Progressive Conservative Party of Ontario leadership contest, replacing long-serving John Robarts as the official party leader and Premier of Ontario. Shortly after taking power, on 3 June Davis announced that he was cancelling provincial support for the highly controversial Spadina Expressway in Toronto, rising in the legislature and stating that "Cities were built for people and not cars. If we are building a transportation system to serve the automobile, the Spadina Expressway would be a good place to start. But if we are building a transportation system to serve people, the Spadina Expressway is a good place to stop."

Davis felt that the future of urban transit lay not in the automobile, but mass rapid transit systems. In keeping with this, the street portion of the Spadina Expressway was cancelled in 1971, but full funding remained for the Spadina subway line that shared the same right-of-way. However, subways were suitable only for high-density routes that could afford to pay for their expensive construction and operation. In 1980 this was estimated to be between $75 and $80 million a mile. The TTC suggested that all of the high-density routes suitable for subways were already being served.

The other vehicles in use with the TTC, buses and streetcars, would not be able to provide rapid transit unless they were given a separate right-of-way. This expense is easy to justify in the case of a subway with its large passenger capacity, but for a system like a bus the capital costs overwhelm the passenger numbers these systems could carry. What was needed was a new system that reduced the capital costs to be able to efficiently serve low-density routes in the suburbs, a system with flexible sizing somewhere between a small subway and large streetcar, an "intermediate" sized system.

=== ICTS ===
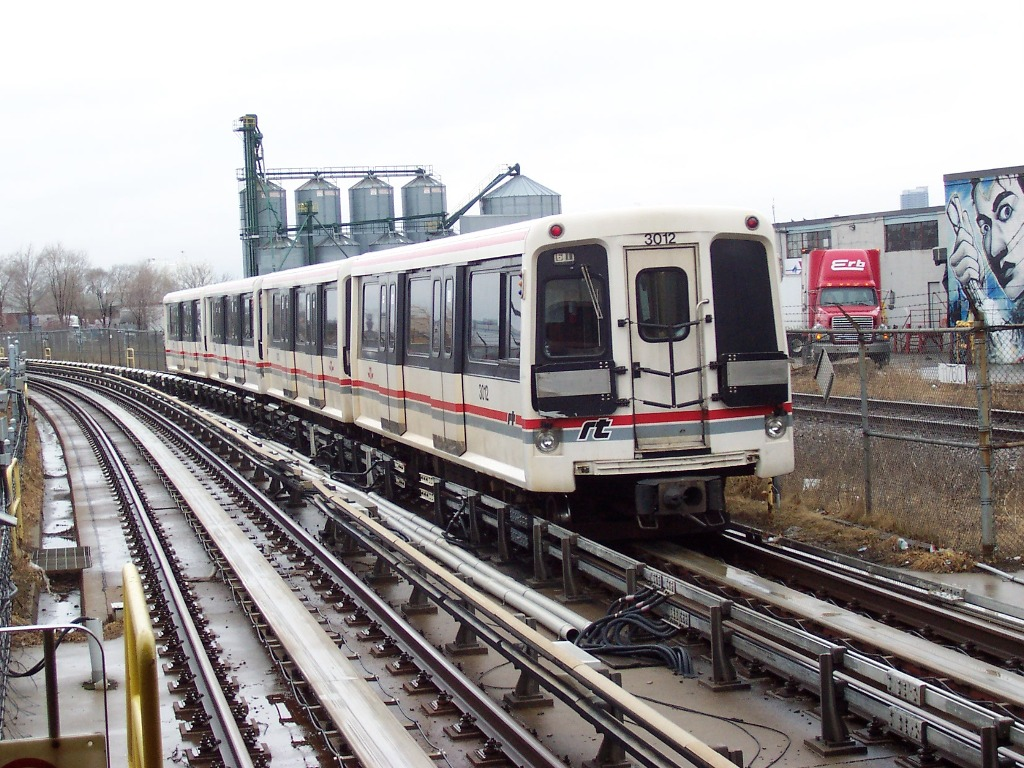
ICTS Mark I trains have a conventional subway appearance. This example, on the Scarborough RT (since sold to Detroit People Mover), has a driver

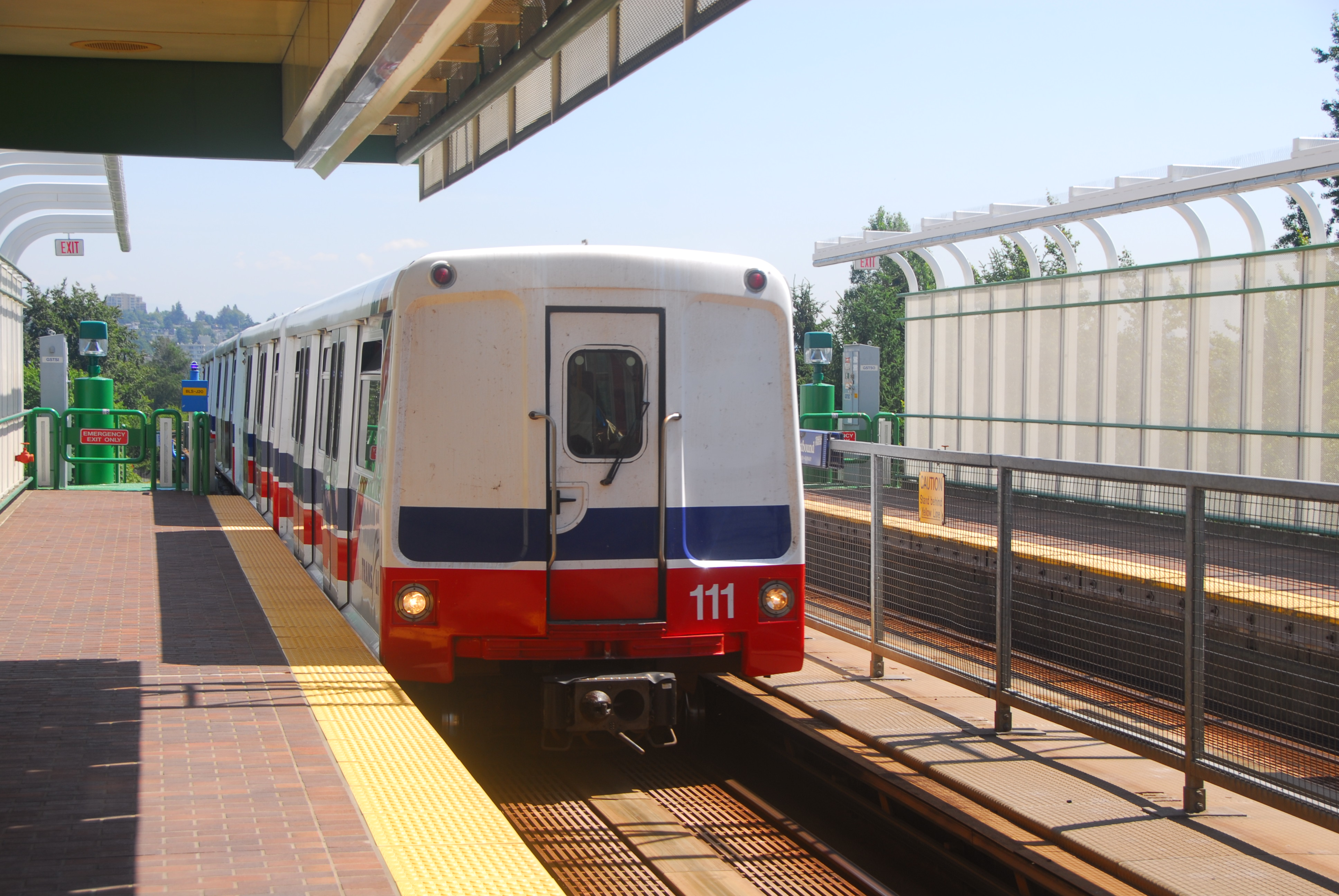
A driverless Mark I operating on the Vancouver SkyTrain

Work on an Intermediate Capacity Transit System (ICTS) had already started in 1970. Several consulting firms were asked to provide separate feasibility reports with outlines of a basic system. At the time, new urban transit systems were a field of active research across North America due to U.S. federal funding under the Urban Mass Transportation Administration's (UMTA) plans to roll out new systems in cities across the country. UMTA was convinced that urban rail systems would only be able to compete with cars if they had more car-like capabilities, and they were primarily interested in the personal rapid transit (PRT) concept of automated car-like cabs that would pick up and drop off passengers as individual units and then link up into longer trains for travel at high speed between stations. A number of companies in the U.S. were in the process of developing systems for UMTA, and many of these companies submitted a proposal for the ICTS project.

It was with the formation of the new Ministry of Transportation and Communications in May 1972 that serious development of the ICTS started. On 22 November the new policy was announced. The Davis government proposed a new rail network known as GO-Urban that would operate three routes in the Toronto area under the auspices of the recently created GO Transit, and asked for submissions for ICTS vehicles to serve the routes. Fourteen designs were studied, but whittled down to eight formal proposals. Some were PRT systems, while others were more traditional subway-like systems. Three of the eight ran on rubber wheels, four were air cushion vehicles (hovercraft) including a version of the French Aérotrain, while the German firm Krauss-Maffei entered its Transurban system, based on magnetically levitated train (maglev) technology.

The space age maglev system immediately won the interest of the Davis government, and in the Phase II proposals they selected it for further study, along with the Ford ACT and Hawker Siddeley's entry, both of which used rubber tires. Ford withdrew when the ICTS varied too greatly from the system it wanted to develop, which was aimed primarily at sites in the U.S. With only Hawker Siddeley and Krauss-Maffei remaining, the 1 May 1973 announcement that the Krauss-Maffei design had won the contest was unsurprising.

In November 1974 Krauss-Maffei announced that it was forced to withdraw from the project. The West German government had been funding development of several maglev systems based on different technologies, and decided at that time that Krauss-Maffei's system was less interesting than ones from Thyssen-Henschel and Messerschmitt-Bölkow-Blohm. There were also technical problems; in testing, the complex systems needed to switch trains on the magnetic tracks froze up, and would require a re-design. With Krauss-Maffei's financial support gone, and daunting technical problems remaining to be solved, the maglev project died. A test track being constructed on the grounds of the Canadian National Exhibition was abandoned in place, with the foundations and a few support pillars already constructed. Krauss-Maffei continued development of the original inter-city Transrapid, but at a very slow pace and through a series of mergers with other companies involved in maglev technology. The first Transrapid system did not enter service until 30 years later.

=== UTDC ===
On 14 April 1975, the Ministry of Transportation arranged financing for Phase I and II studies to develop a new system to replace the maglev. In June 1975 the Ontario Transportation Development Corporation (OTDC) announced that it had arranged a consortium to continue the development of the ICTS, changing its name to "Urban Transportation Development Corporation" to avoid any "provinciality" during its efforts to market what would now be an entirely local design to other cities. The consortium consisted of SPAR Aerospace for the linear induction motor, Standard Elektrik Lorenz's "SelTrac IS" system for the automatic control system, Dofasco for an articulated bogie system, Alcan for the design of the car bodies and a set of prototypes, and Canadair for assembly and production.

A Transit Development Centre for UTDC was built on a 480-acre (190 ha) site in Millhaven, outside of Kingston, Ontario. Kingston had been home to the Canadian Locomotive Company that closed its doors in 1969, and the city lobbied hard for the new company to locate there. It was officially opened on 29 September 1978 by James Snow, the Minister of Transportation and Communications. The site included a 1.9 km (1.2 mi) oval test track that included at-grade, elevated and ramped sections, switches, and the automatic control centre. Phase III of the ICTS program ended on 31 January 1980 when testing on the prototype was completed at the Millhaven site; by this point the government had invested about $57.2 million, of a total $63 million spent on the product by the government and its industrial partners.

Looking for a site in Ontario to serve as a test bed for the ICTS, the government focused on an extension of the eastern end of TTC's Bloor–Danforth line. The TTC had already started building a streetcar line that would extend from the end of the subway at Kennedy station to the Scarborough City Centre, a low-density route passing through industrial land. The TTC was not interested in changing to the ICTS for this route, until the Ontario government, which provided about 80% of the capital costs, stepped in and demanded the ICTS be used. A smaller system in Hamilton, Ontario was also considered, and there was a brief study for a similar system in Ottawa, Ontario. Vancouver, British Columbia was interested in the system as part of the Expo 86 buildout in keeping with the theme, "Transportation and Communication". Although the UMTA program in the U.S. was "de-funded" that year, Detroit pressed ahead with its plans and signed up in August. Hamilton, Ottawa, Miami, Los Angeles and Washington, D.C. were also in talks with UTDC. With three customers lined up, a manufacturing plant was added to the Millhaven site, VentureTrans Manufacturing, which opened in 1982. Having won the contracts in Canada and USA, UTDC attempted to market the ICTS technology in Europe and Asia. One "near-miss" was in London, where UTDC succeeded in persuading the client, the London Docklands Development Corporation, to purchase a driverless elevated system for its Docklands Light Railway. However, due to funding constraints, a cheaper system requiring an on-board attendant was implemented.

In 1982 UTDC also entered a design to offer rail service to the suburbs east of Toronto, a system known as GO ALRT. ALRT was based on the ICTS technology, but used a longer car about the size of a conventional railway passenger car, and replaced the third rail power with an overhead pantograph. Given the larger sized cars that made mechanical placements easier, conventional motors replaced the linear motor in order to reduce capital costs (the linear motor requires an aluminum "fourth rail" for the entire line). However, due to changes in the laws governing the operation of GO trains on the freight railways they ran on, GO was able to improve its schedules without having to build any new infrastructure. ALRT was cancelled in 1985 in favour of conventional heavy rail technology. UTDC later played an important part in this build-out in spite of these changes, and GO eventually built its own twin-track line to Oshawa. Construction of the exclusive guideway had already begun in the early 1980s for GO ALRT, which was then modified shortly after to allow for conventional GO Train service. Work on the exclusive track from Pickering to Whitby was completed in 1988, followed by an extension to Oshawa in 1995 with limited service, which was shortly after pushed back up to all day two-way service, allowing for further expansion of Lakeshore East GO train service.

Construction of the Toronto and Vancouver systems proceeded apace, with the Scarborough RT opening for service on 22 March 1985, followed by the Vancouver SkyTrain on 11 December 1985, where passenger service on what is today's Expo Line started in January 1986. The systems suffered from serious teething problems; snow froze to the third rail which required the Scarborough RT system to be fitted with protective covers. The braking system was too powerful and caused the wheels to rub flat in spots, which led to noisy running, the opposite of the design goal. Bugs in the automatic control software led to a number of problems with doors that would not open, "phantom cars" that would appear mid-line and cause the collision avoidance systems to turn on and freeze trains in place in spite of having a driver. A host of other problems seriously delayed scheduled operations. In Toronto, the Scarborough RT became a subject of ridicule, often closing in heavy snows. Most of the problems with the Toronto and Vancouver systems were worked out by the time the Detroit People Mover opened in July 1987.

In the early 1980s, the UTDC was involved in the planning of a new light railway in the northwest New Territories, Hong Kong. The corporation was engaged under a bid by Kowloon Wharf to build and operate the system. After Kowloon Wharf pulled out of the project in 1983, citing concerns over the slow pace of development in Tuen Mun New Town, UTDC was among several companies that expressed interest in building the railway, but not in operating it. The Light Rail Transit was eventually built by the Kowloon-Canton Railway Corporation and opened in 1988.

=== Can-Car Rail ===
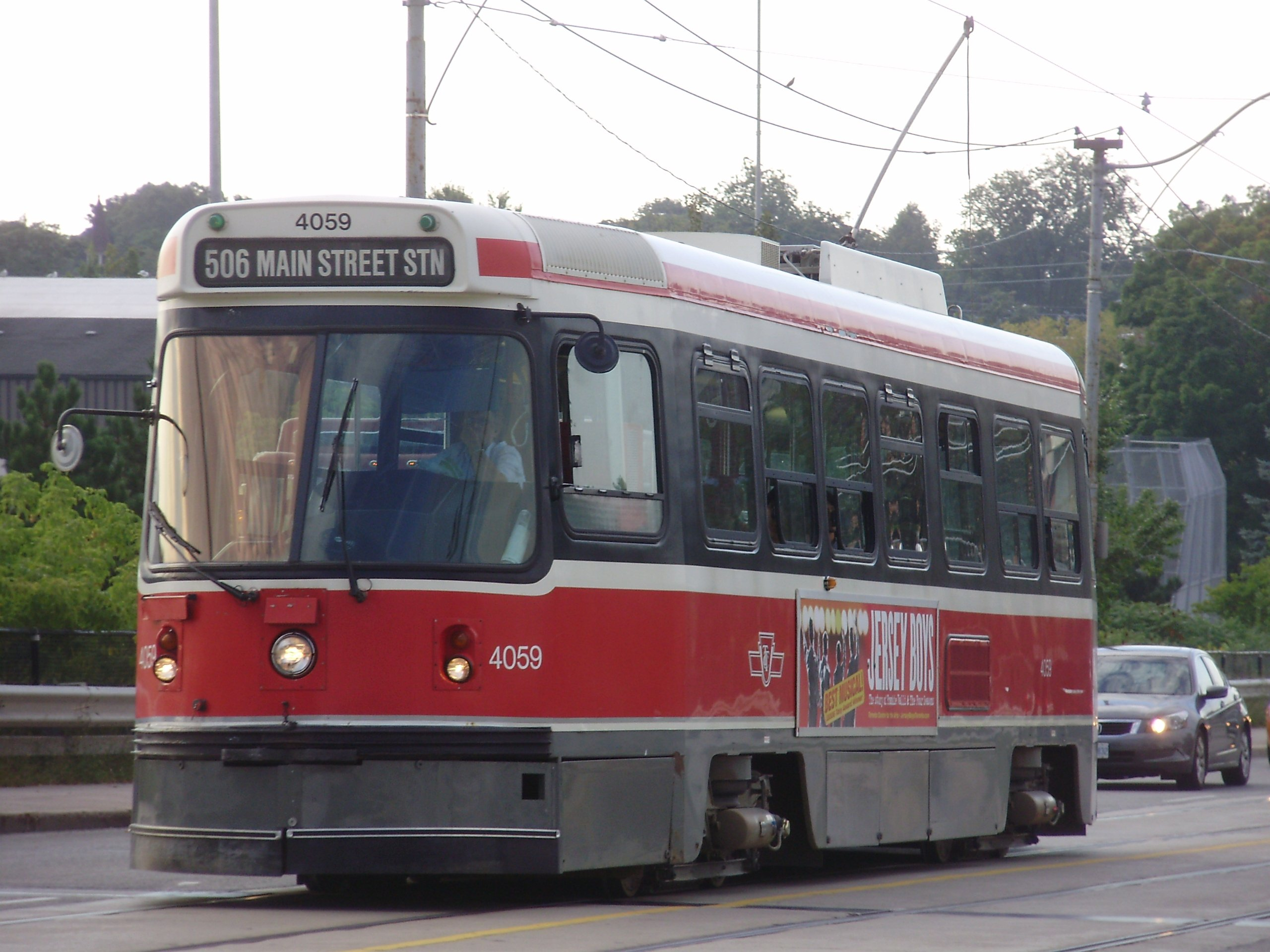
A CLRV L2 streetcar operating for the Toronto Transit Commission

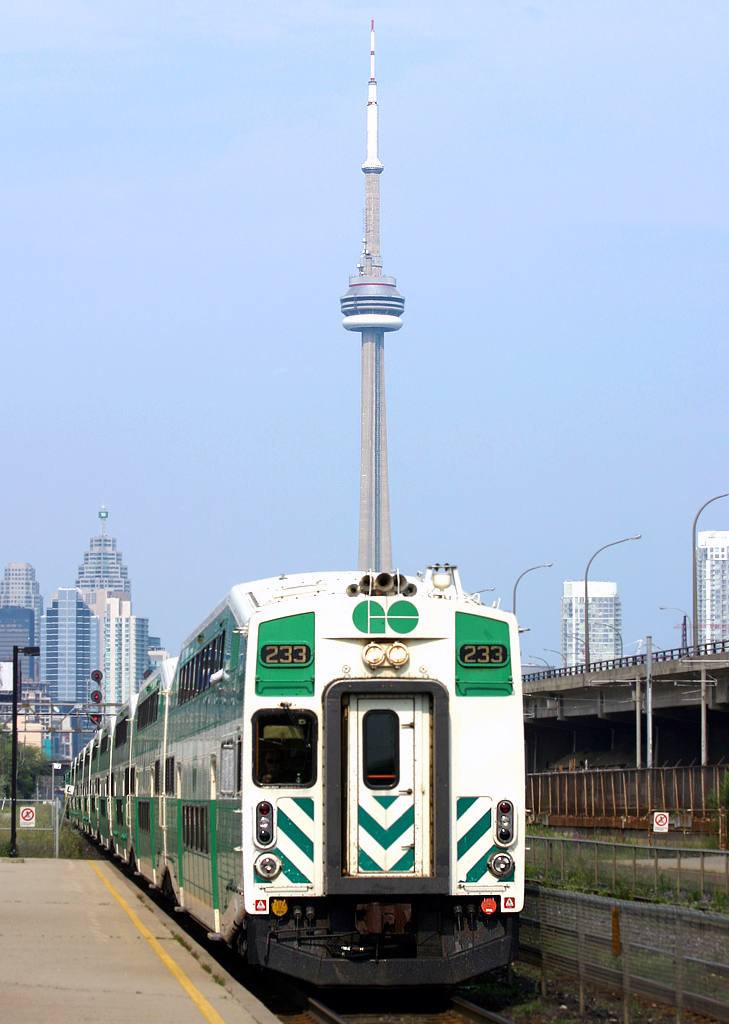
A GO Transit Bi-level coach in Toronto

Starting in 1972, the TTC contracted Hawker Siddeley Canada to design a new streetcar known as the "Municipal Surface Car". However, the Government of Ontario had formed the OTDC in the early 1970s, and provided the TTC 75% of its capital funding. The government then demanded that the TTC turn to OTDC for new vehicles.

In August 1973 the TTC placed an order with the OTDC for 200 new Canadian Light Rail Vehicles (CLRV). The design was purchased from the Swiss company Schweizerische Industrie Gesellschaft (SIG). SIG was contracted to build the first 10 before turning over construction to OTDC, subcontracted at Hawker Siddeley's CC&F factory in Thunder Bay. The prototype run was cut to six, in order to allow four to be converted into an articulated design, the Articulated Light Rail Vehicle (ALRV). UTDC unveiled the ALRV at a 18–19 June 1982 open house at its Transit Development Centre, which over 10,000 people attended.

In March 1983 Hawker Siddeley Canada sold a portion of its CC&F factory in Thunder Bay to the UTDC, creating the jointly owned Can-Car Rail. Hawker Siddeley had already developed a number of rail vehicles, and with its partnership with UTDC these became the favoured products for a number of contracts in Ontario. In addition to the ICTS, UTDC now had a product portfolio that spanned everything from streetcars to subways to traditional heavy rail passenger cars and hoppers.

=== Continued successes ===
In December 1983 the TTC announced that it was buying 126 subway cars from UTDC, and followed this in February 1984 with an order for 52 ALRVs. The subway cars were built at Can-Car, but after the first ten ALRVs, streetcar production moved to the Millhaven plants which were winding down their ICTS production.

A further run of a modified double-ended ALRVs followed for the Santa Clara County Transportation Agency (now the Santa Clara Valley Transportation Authority), and then a run of 58 subway cars for the Massachusetts Bay Transportation Authority in Boston. These were the first of many such orders, and hundreds of subway cars were delivered to various U.S. transport services over the next two decades.

Since the early 1970s, Hawker Siddeley had been designing a new two-level railcar for GO Transit, which they started delivering in 1976 as the BiLevel. GO continued placing additional orders, eventually buying 470 for their service in southern Ontario, where the BiLevel is widely associated with GO.

When downsizing hit GO in the early 1990s, a number of these coaches were leased out to various operators in Canada and the US. They were received to rave reviews, and quickly generated orders from operators across North America. Several hundred additional BiLevel cars were built, and over 700 remain in service.

UTDC's Can-Car also produced a number of other products for sales to the Canadian Forces, the medium-sized M35 2-1/2 ton cargo truck and the larger Steyr Percheron.

=== Sale to Lavalin ===
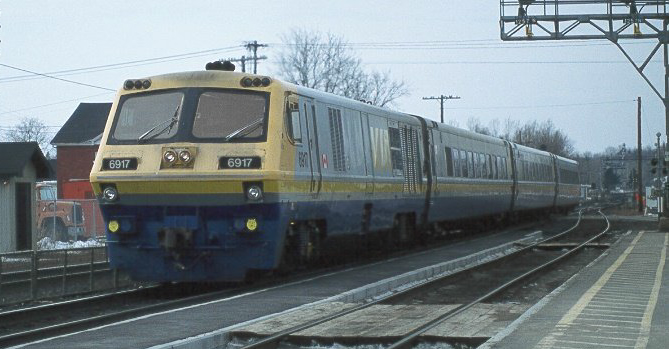
The LRC intercity train developed for Via Rail

As early as 1981 the Government of Ontario had considered selling UTDC to the private sector. The government's concern was that without a manufacturing business, UTDC would find it difficult to make enough income to justify its Kingston operations. If the company did start a manufacturing side, it would be inappropriate for the company to remain government owned. In 1986 the new Ontario government announced its intention to sell UTDC to Lavalin, a large engineering company in Montreal, Quebec. Lavalin purchased the company for CAD$50 million, less than the $70 million spent on the UTDC by the government up to 1981. The sale was very controversial at the time: $39 million of several non-performance payments had to be made because of the early problems on the ICTS that had to be paid out by the government. Soon after, Hawker Siddeley announced that it was selling its remaining interest in CC&F to Lavalin as well.

This was during a period of rapid conglomeration by Lavalin, which included purchases of the Bellechasse Hospital in Montreal, MétéoMédia's television services, and many other businesses that were unrelated to its core engineering strengths. By the early 1990s this aggressive expansion plan led to a massive debt load and serious financial difficulties. In 1991, Lavalin's bankers put it under pressure to be acquired by its chief rival, SNC. Lavalin announced its intent to sell its stake in UTDC, and several companies expressed an interest, including Asea Brown Boveri and Westinghouse. Before this was completed, the company went bankrupt.

=== Sale to Bombardier Transportation ===
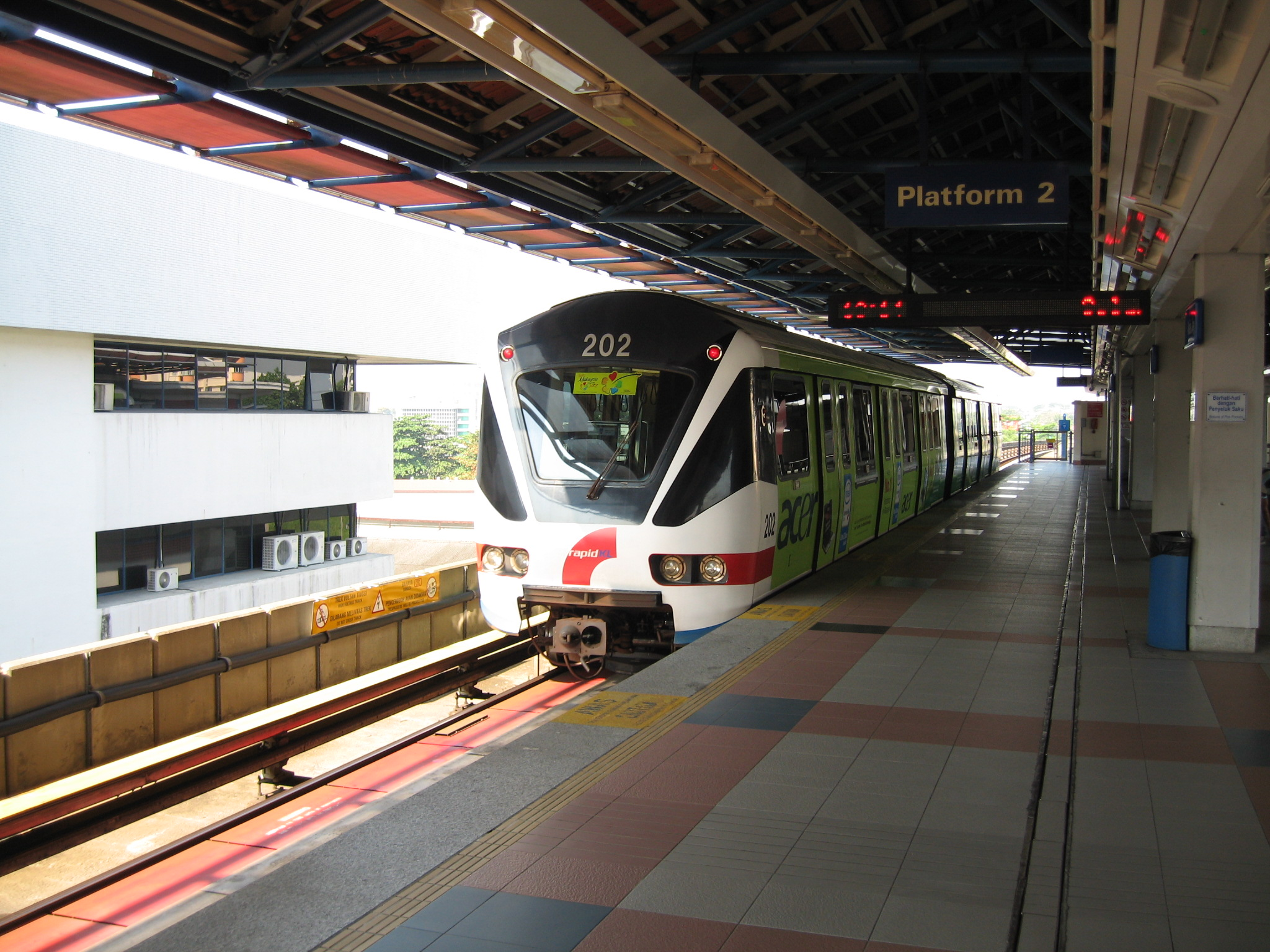
The Kelana Jaya line in Kuala Lumpur uses Bombardier's second-generation ART technology

As part of the proceedings, UTDC was returned to the Government of Ontario, which quickly sold it to Bombardier in February 1992. Bombardier Transportation had in late 1991 negotiated a $17 million subsidy from the Ontario government for the purchase. SNC purchased the engineering portions of the company and became SNC-Lavalin, while most other business were sold to other firms. At that time, UTDC Inc. was a manufacturer of mass transit vehicles with 860 workers in Thunder Bay and Kingston, Ontario, creating a yearly turnover of .US$250 million. Bombardier received a US$17 million subsidy in return for commitments to maintain employment and investments of up to US$30 million in plant and equipment.

Bombardier quickly re-branded the UTDC products under its growing Bombardier Transportation marque, which started in 1970 with its purchase of Rotax, which made engines used in Bombardier's snowmobiles as well as tramcars. Now in the train business, in 1975 it added the Montreal Locomotive Works and its LRC high-speed train design. Although the LRC was never the success Bombardier hoped, the company continued to buy other rail companies in North America and Europe, dramatically expanding its divisions until, with its purchase of ADtranz in 2001, the largest supplier of rail equipment in the world at the time.

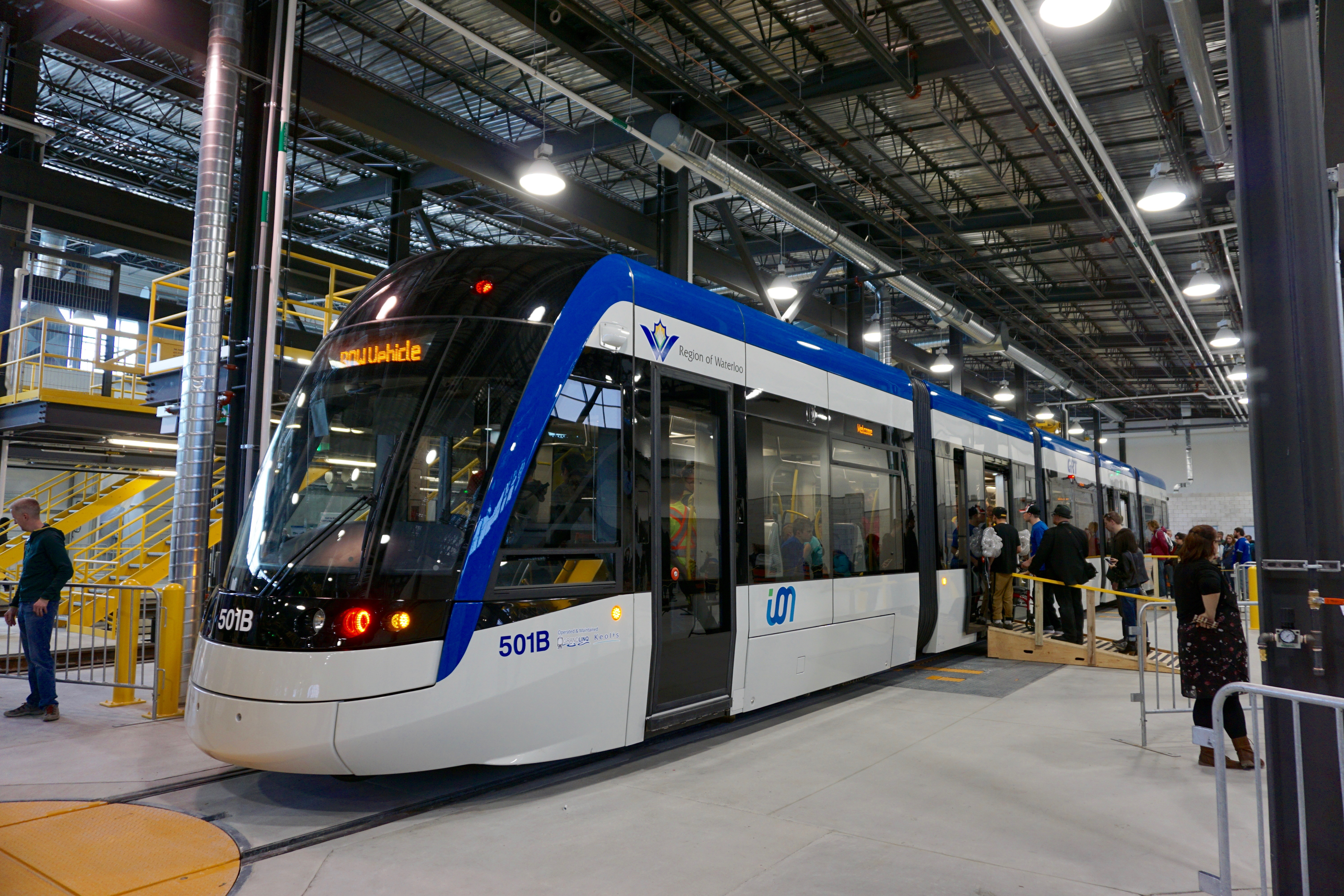
The Bombardier Flexity Freedom light rail vehicle built for the Ion rapid transit network in the Kitchener-Waterloo region

Bombardier was much more aggressive in marketing the UTDC product line than either the government or Lavalin had been, especially the ICTS. Bombardier re-designed the cars, expanding the passenger capacity and updating their look, re-introducing the product as the Bombardier Advanced Rapid Transit (ART). ART won the contest for the AirTrain JFK project, and an improved design introducing articulating sections between adjacent cars (replacing the coupling and doors of the older (retroactively named) Mark I design) have won several new contests, including the Millennium Line extension of the Vancouver SkyTrain network. ART technology has also been exported outside North America, and is in use on the Kelana Jaya Line in Kuala Lumpur, the Airport Express in Beijing (in four-car trains), and on the EverLine outside of Seoul. The design has since evolved into the third-generation Bombardier Innovia Metro design and marketed as part of Bombardier's Innovia family of automated transportation products.

Vancouver continues to be the largest operator of the ICTS system, with nearly 50 kilometres (31 mi) of operational Innovia Metro trackage on two of its SkyTrain lines since the Evergreen Extension began service in 2016. Its entire fleet of Mk I and Mk II trains remain in service and have been supplemented by newly built Mk III trains.

Bombardier also continues to win sales with its other light rail vehicles, including a major expansion of its globally based Bombardier Flexity platform to the North American streetcar and light rail markets. In 2009, the TTC selected a derivative of the Bombardier Flexity Outlook design to replace its legacy fleet and make its entire streetcar network wheelchair-accessible, and in 2010 Metrolinx commissioned a large order of Bombardier Flexity Freedom LRVs for newly constructed light rail lines in the Greater Toronto Area. Although manufacturing of both the TTC and Metrolinx orders was intended to be completed entirely at the CC&F plants, recurrent delays and other technical problems have led to Bombardier opening a second production line at the former CLC site in Kingston.

== UTDC products ==
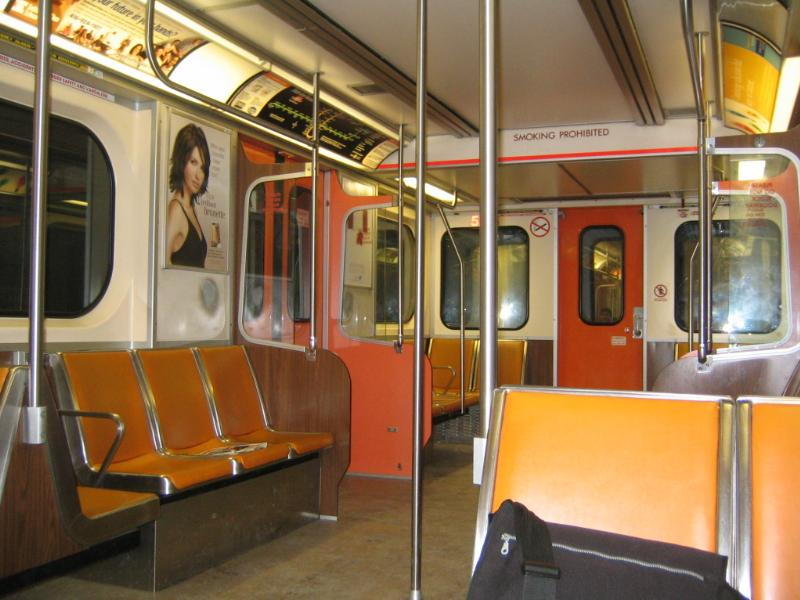
Interior of UTDC H6 subway car

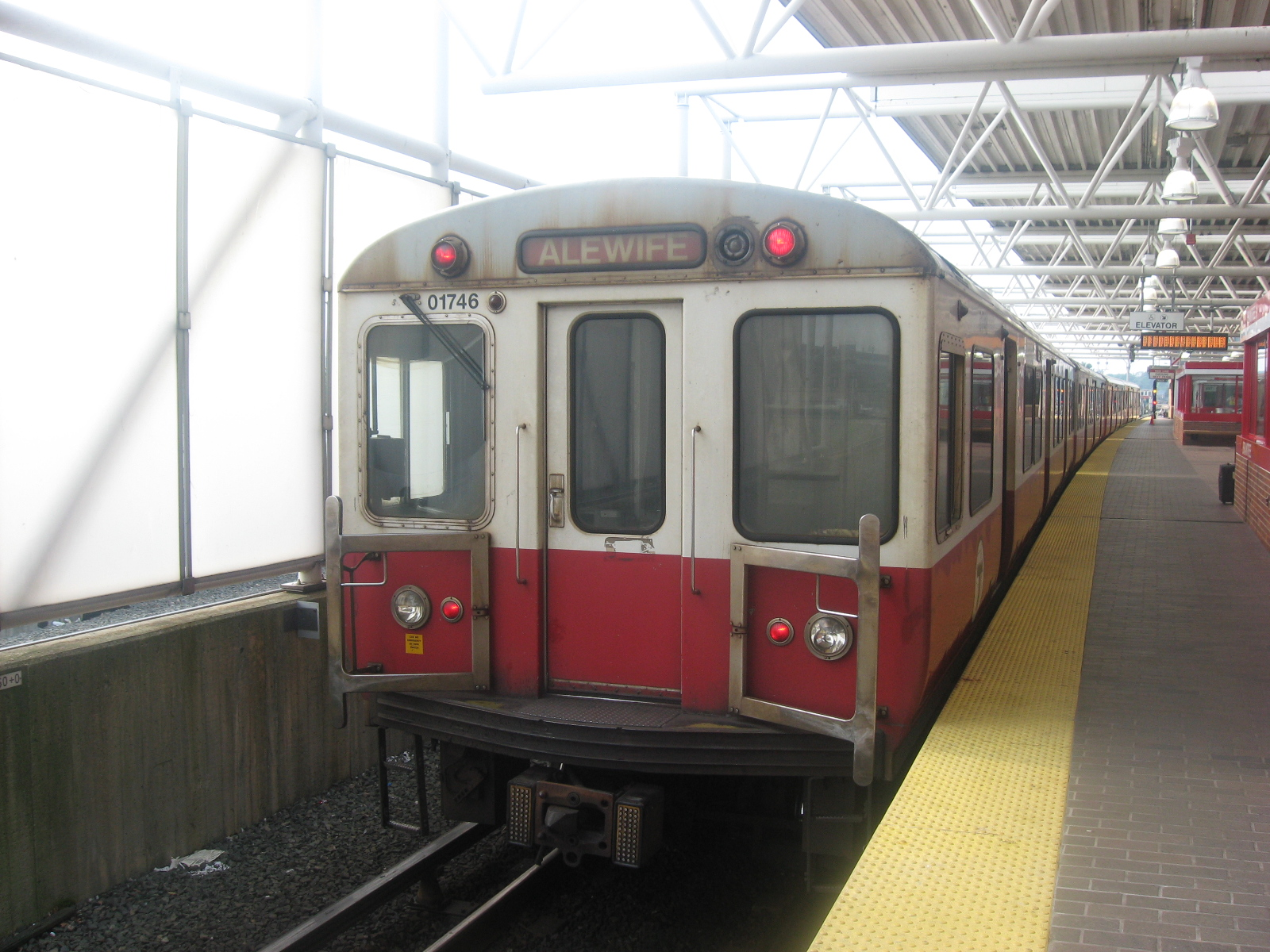
Massachusetts Bay Transportation Authority 1700-series subway cars

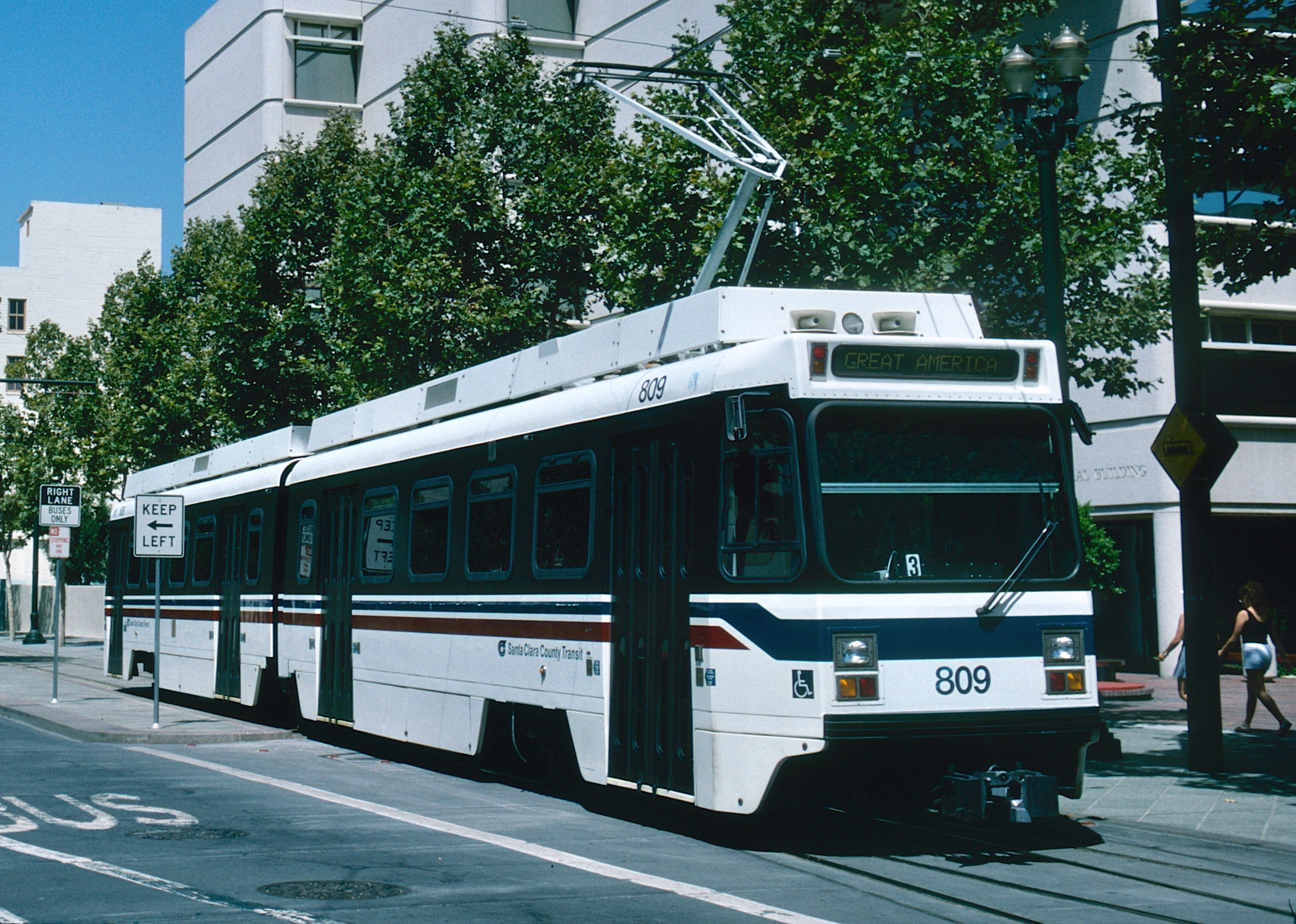
Santa Clara County (San Jose) UTDC LRV

=== Mass transit ===
- H6 subway cars (Toronto Transit Commission 1986-1989), modified version also used by Ankara Metro 1996-1998; retired by TTC in 2014 and Ankara 2019
- #3 (01700 series) subway cars (Massachusetts Bay Transportation Authority) for the Red Line 1988

=== Light rail ===
- ICTS Mark I; 2, 4 or 6 car working model (Toronto Transit Commission (early 1980s and retired 24 July 2023), TransLink (British Columbia), Detroit People Mover)
- ICTS Mark I Test Vehicles; test vehicle TV-1 (used to test bogies), prototype lead car and trailer used by UTDC Test Centre built at in house Venture Trans Manufacturing c. 1982
- ICTS Mark II Clearance Test; 1 working car (BC Transit/TransLink)
- CLRV L2 (Toronto Transit Commission 1977-1981); retired in 2019
- ALRV L3 (Toronto Transit Commission 1987-1989); retired in 2019
- VTA light rail cars ~1986-1987 (SCVTA operated 50, secondhand use in Sacramento (operates 20 cars) and Salt Lake City (operated 29)) - Double-ended articulated variant of the ALRV L3 cars; some cars sold to TRAX and Sacramento Regional Transit District (used by Sacramento RT Light Rail); Salt Lake City cars retired in 2018 and Sacramento cars refurbished in 2015 are used until 2022.

=== Heavy rail ===
- Bi-Level III and IV coaches - originally developed by Hawker Siddeley Canada - GO Transit, Altamont Corridor Express and various other North American operators
- GO ALRT, a lengthened and articulated version of the ICTS (prototype only).

=== Military and other ===
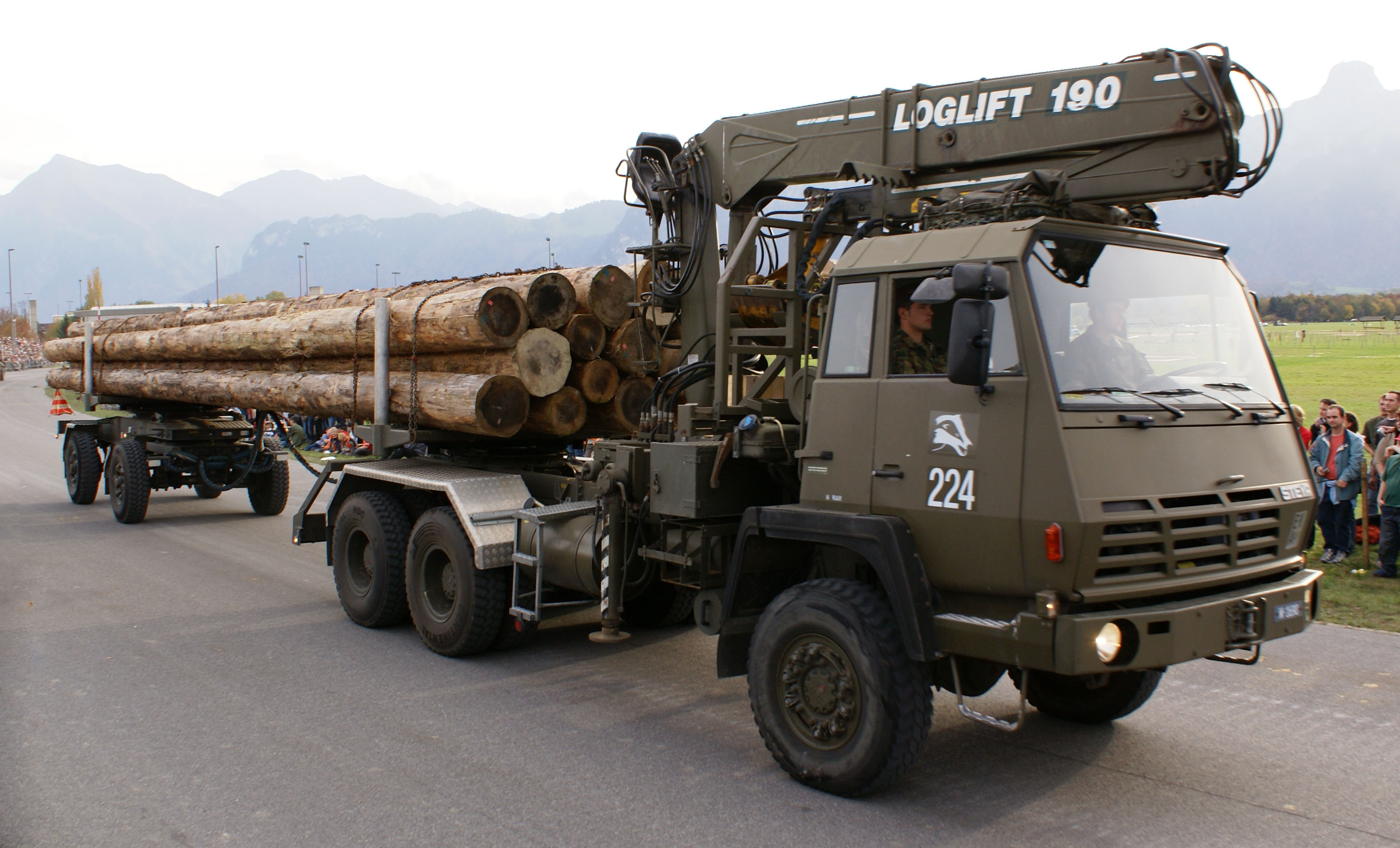
Similar Steyr chassis is the basis of UTDC 24M32

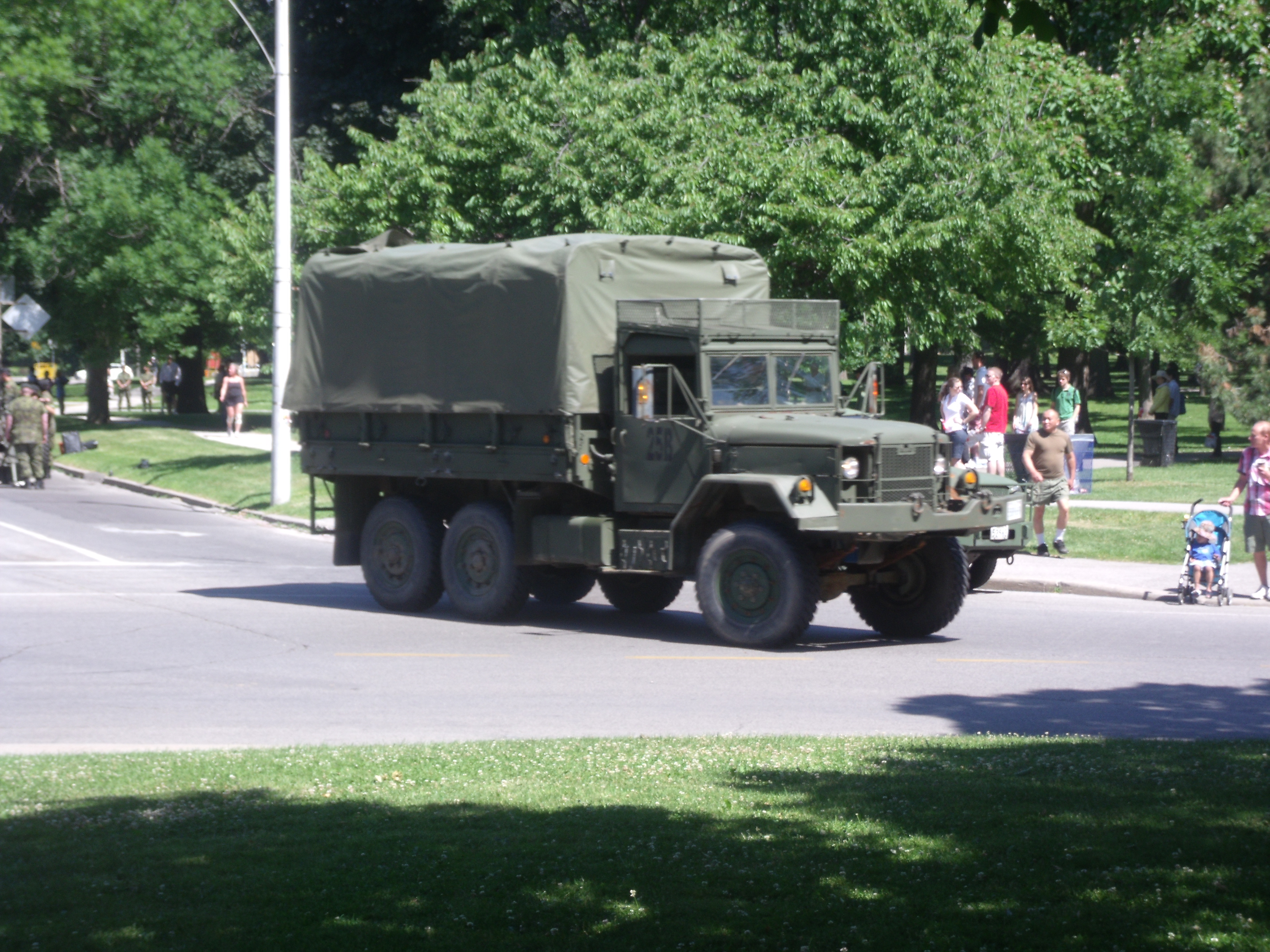
MLVW

UTDC Can Car Rail division built several military vehicles for the Canadian Forces:

- UTDC 24M32 - HLVW military trucks based on the Steyr 91 (Percheron)
- MLVW military trucks based on the M35 2-1/2 ton cargo truck; retired 2019

Transportation Technology Ltd. installed:

- An automated factory floor pallet transfer system (Intellimotion) for Continental Can in Toronto (1987). Similar to an automated guided vehicle (AGV), it used multiple LIMs (linear induction motors) mounted in the floor with a slot for guidance, such that the vehicle itself was passive (unpowered) and propelled across the open floor and up/down an 18% grade by the LIMs. The flush-mounted motors and sensors could be safely driven over by 10-ton forklift trucks.
- An automated baggage transport system for the Singapore Changi International Airport expansion (1990) between Terminals 1 and 2. Over 200 LIMs were mounted in a 1 km looped dedicated track with the control system designed to "slingshot" the baggage carts from one LIM to the next (approx. 10m spacing).

Multi-Purpose Small Bus, a handicap transit vehicle developed by UTDC with Rek-Vee Industries in Scarborough and FunCraft Vehicles in Cambridge

== Major clients ==
- Canadian Forces
- Toronto Transit Commission
- GO Transit
- Santa Clara Valley Transportation Authority
- Massachusetts Bay Transportation Authority
- Vancouver SkyTrain
- Detroit People Mover
