= Canadian Light Rail Vehicle =

Type of Canadian streetcar

CLRV
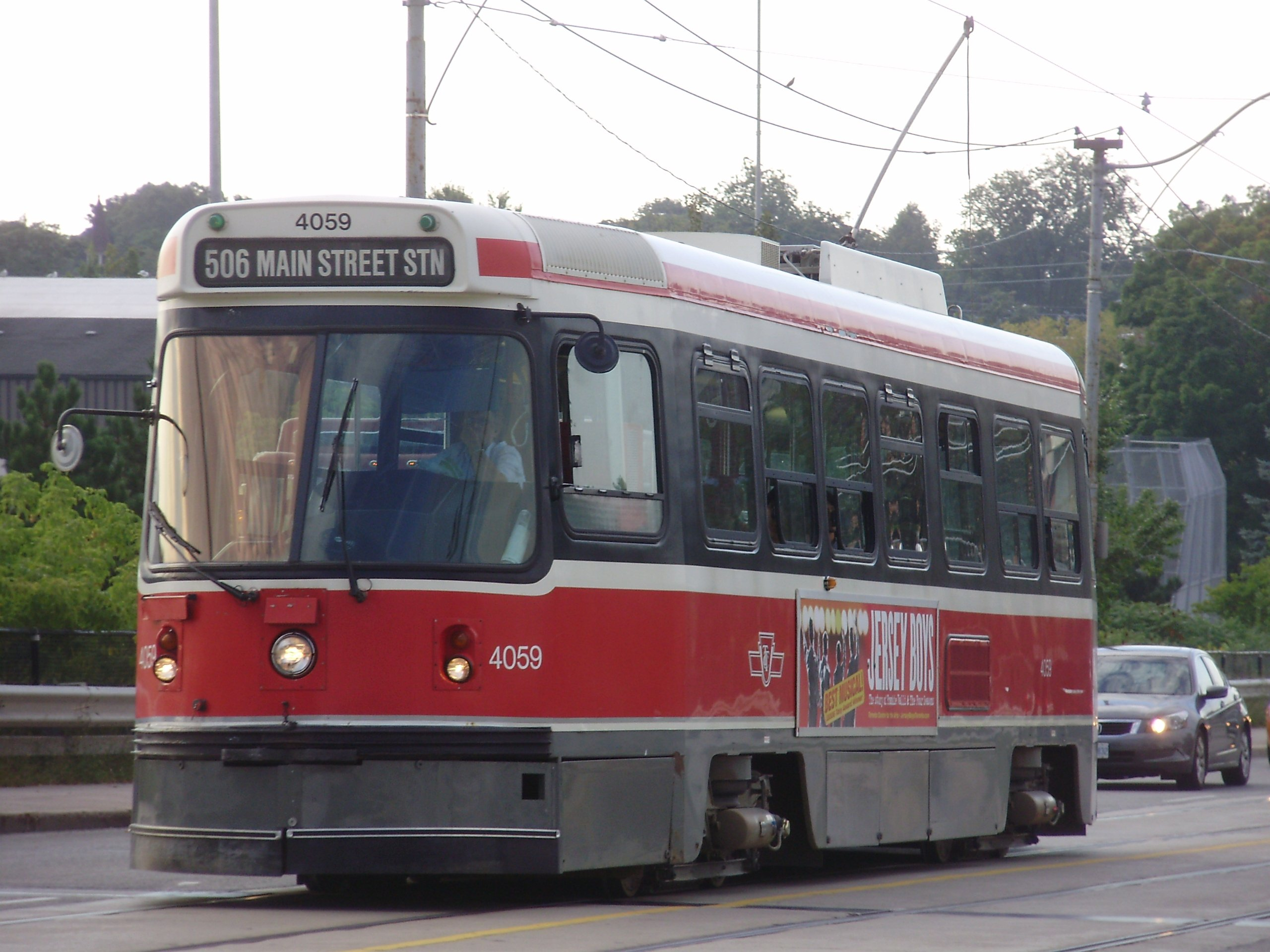
- A 506 Carlton CLRV car crosses the Main Street Bridge in 2008.

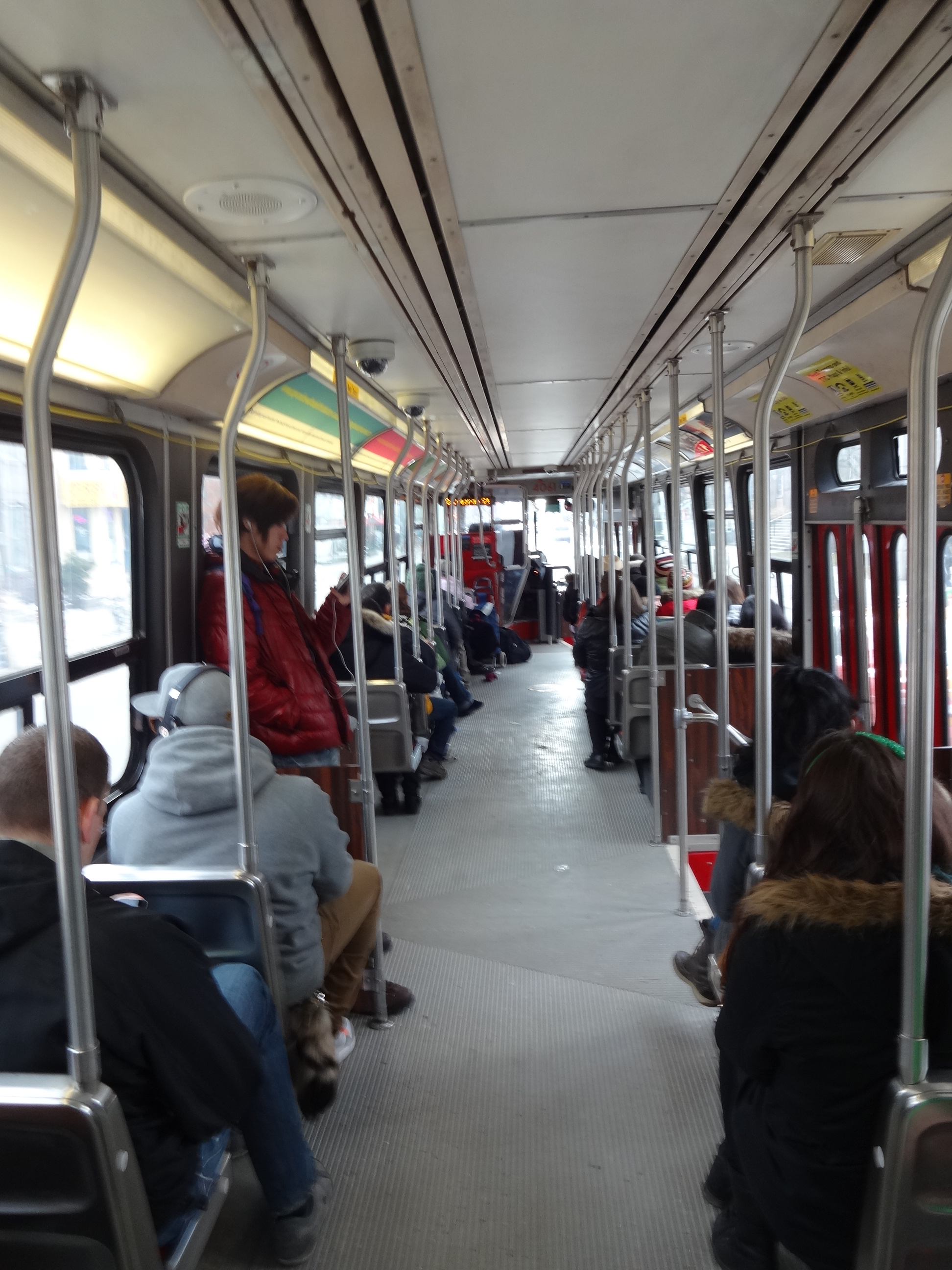
- Interior of the CLRV
- In service: 1979–2019
- Manufacturers: L-1: SIG; L-2: UTDC
- Constructed: 1977–1981
- Entered service: September 30, 1979
- Number built: 196
- Number in service: 0
- Number preserved: 11 in Canada, 4 in United States
- Number scrapped: ~190
- Successor: Flexity Outlook
- Fleet numbers: L-1: 4000–4005; L-2: 4010–4199
- Capacity: 42–46 seated, (Note: during rebuilds 4 seats removed) 74 at peak with standees
- Operators: Toronto Transit Commission (former, all retired with a few cars to be restored for special occasions), Halton County Radial Railway (3 cars as work museum artifacts)
- Line served: Toronto streetcar system

Specifications
- Car length: 15.226 m (49 ft 11 7/16 in)
- Width: 2.540 m (8 ft 4 in); (2.591 m or 8 ft 6 in over rub rails)
- Height: 3.625 m (11 ft 10 11/16 in)
- Floor height: 1.125 m (3 ft 8 5/16 in)
- Platform height: curb height or level with rail head
- Entry: 4 steps (3 risers inside plus step up from outside)
- Doors: 2 (1 dual bi-fold front door; 2 paired double leaf rear doorways)
- Maximum speed: 80 km/h (49.7 mph)
- Weight: 22,685 kg (50,011 lb 14 oz)
- Power output: 2 x 136 kW (182 hp) continuous
- Acceleration: 1.47 m/s^{2} (4.8 ft/s^{2}) or 5.3 km/(h⋅s); 3.3 mph/s
- Deceleration: 1.6 m/s^{2} (5.2 ft/s^{2}) or 5.8 km/(h⋅s); 3.6 mph/s; Emergency: 3.46 m/s^{2} (11.4 ft/s^{2}) or 12.5 km/(h⋅s); 7.7 mph/s
- Electric system: 600 V DC overhead
- Current collection: Trolley pole
- Minimum turning radius: 36 ft (10.973 m)
- Braking system: Air (Westinghouse Air Brake Company)
- Track gauge: 4 ft 10 7/8 in (1,495 mm) – TTC gauge

ALRV
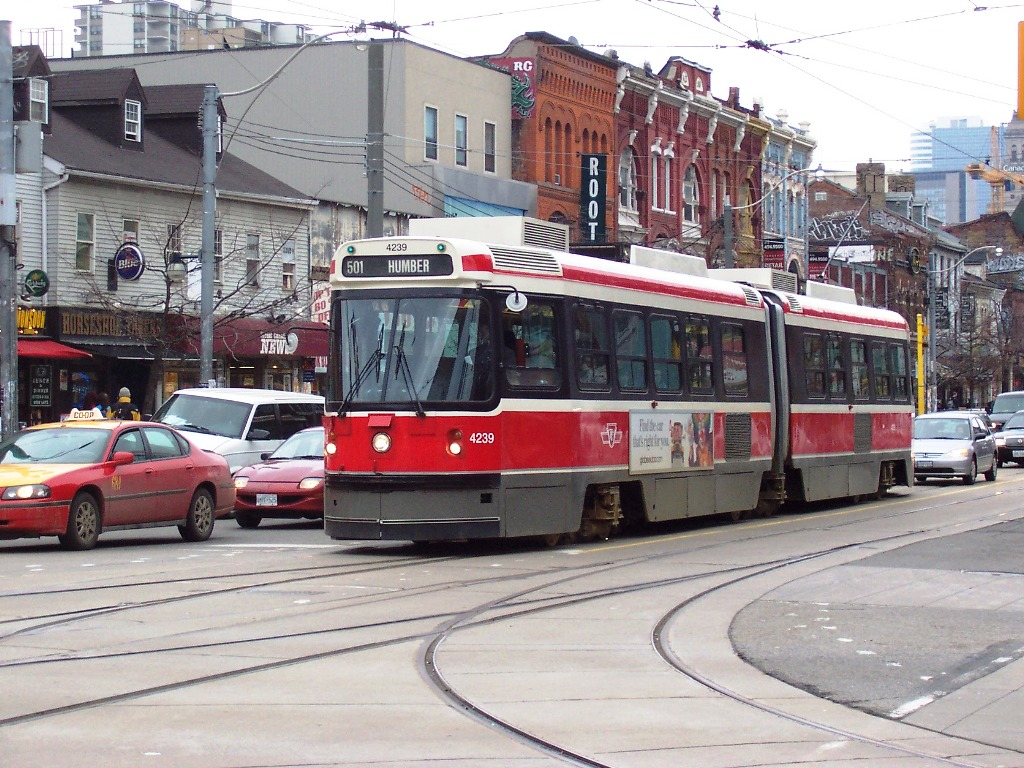
- A Queen car pauses at Spadina Avenue

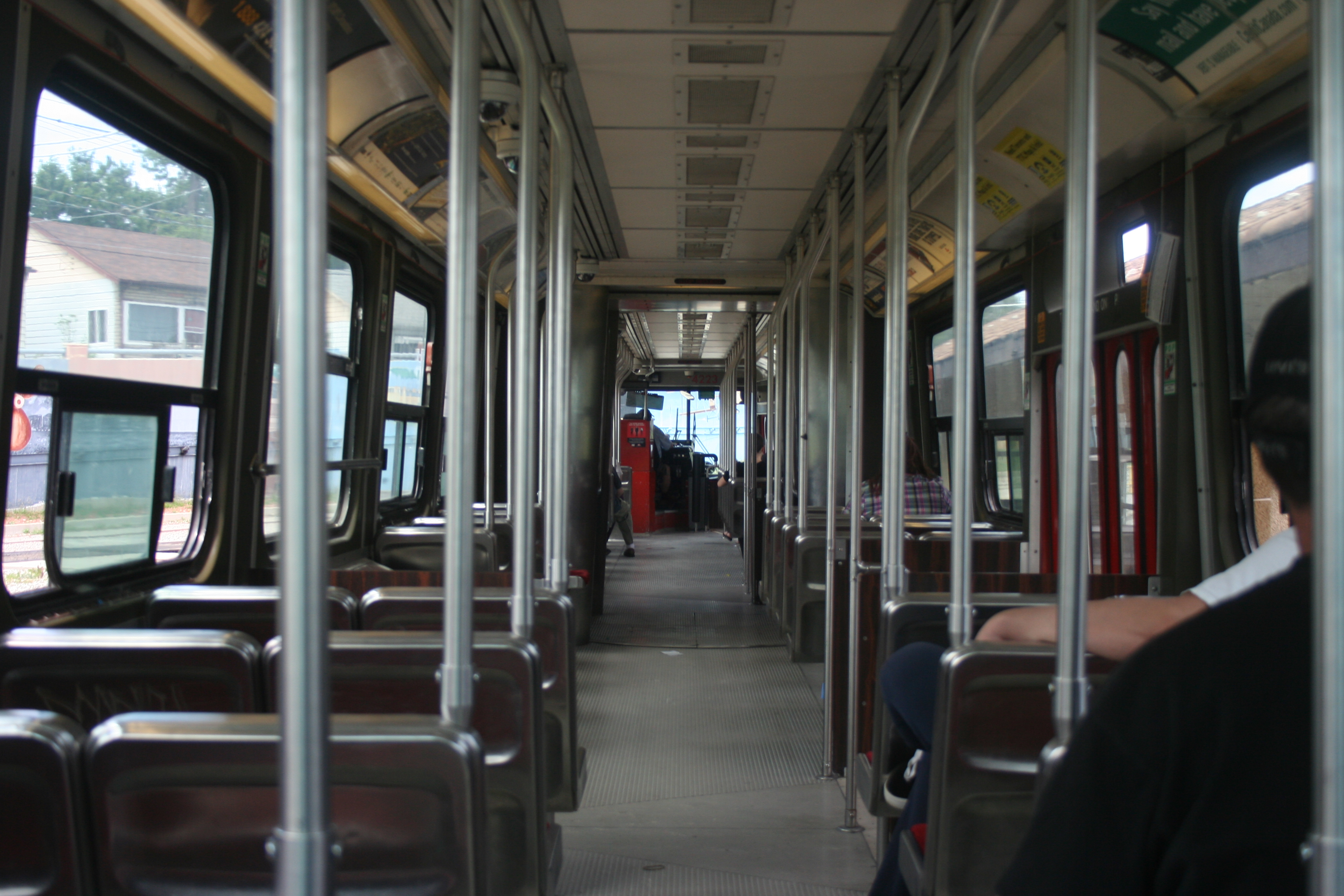
- Interior of the ALRV
- In service: 1988–2019
- Manufacturers: MAN and UTDC; Urban Transportation Development Corporation
- Constructed: 1982 (prototype); 1987–1989
- Entered service: January 19, 1988
- Number built: 52 and 1 prototype
- Number in service: 0
- Number preserved: 2
- Number scrapped: 50 and 1 prototype
- Successor: Flexity Outlook
- Fleet numbers: 4900 (prototype); 4200–4251 (standard)
- Capacity: 61 seated, 108 at peak with standees
- Operators: Toronto Transit Commission (former, all retired; 1 car awaiting restoration), HCRR (1 car awaiting restoration)
- Line served: Toronto streetcar system

Specifications
- Car length: 23.164 m (75 ft 11 15/16 in)
- Width: 2.540 m (8 ft 4 in); (2.591 m or 8 ft 6 in over rub rails)
- Height: 3.626 m (11 ft 10 3/4 in) to roof; roof equipment additional
- Floor height: 1.125 m (3 ft 8 1/4 in)
- Platform height: curb height or level with rail head
- Entry: 4 steps (3 risers inside plus step up from outside)
- Doors: 3
- Articulated sections: 1 section with 2 articulations
- Maximum speed: 80 km/h (49.7 mph)
- Weight: 36,745 kg (81,009 lb)
- Power output: 4 × 65 kW (87 hp) continuous
- Acceleration: 1.2 m/s^{2} (3.9 ft/s^{2}) or 4.3 km/(h⋅s); 2.7 mph/s
- Deceleration: 1.6 m/s^{2} (5.2 ft/s^{2}) or 5.8 km/(h⋅s); 3.6 mph/s Emergency: 3.13 m/s^{2} (10.3 ft/s^{2}) or 11.3 km/(h⋅s); 7.0 mph/s
- Electric system: 600 V DC overhead
- Current collection: Trolley pole
- Minimum turning radius: 36 ft (10.973 m)
- Braking system: Air (Westinghouse Air Brake Company)
- Track gauge: 4 ft 10 7/8 in (1,495 mm) – TTC gauge

The Canadian Light Rail Vehicle (CLRV) and Articulated Light Rail Vehicle (ALRV) were types of streetcars used by the Toronto Transit Commission (TTC) from the late 1970s until they were scrapped in the late 2010s. They were built following the TTC's decision to retain streetcar services in the 1970s, replacing the existing PCC streetcar fleet.

Two variants were produced: the standard single-module CLRV (built between 1977 and 1981) and the longer articulated double-module ALRV (built between 1987 and 1989). The ALRVs were officially retired from regular TTC service on September 2, 2019, with the CLRVs officially retired on December 29, 2019. Both were replaced by the Flexity Outlook, a low-floor streetcar first introduced in 2014.

== History ==
=== CLRV ===
Starting at the end of the 1970s and into the 1980s, the TTC's fleet of PCC streetcars approached (or exceeded in some cases) the end of their useful lives. Many Toronto citizens, and especially a group known as "Streetcars for Toronto" led by transit advocate Steve Munro, had fought successfully against the TTC's plan to convert the remaining streetcar lines to buses, which necessitated a new streetcar model to replace the aging PCCs. The "Canadian Light Rail Vehicle" was an attempt at a new, standardized streetcar design to be used in Toronto and in other new streetcar developments throughout the country.

Hawker Siddeley Canada proposed their version of a streetcar in 1972 known as the Municipal Service Car, which had a bus-like chassis and a semi-low floor design with front and rear doors similar to that of the CLRV fleet. The project was abandoned the following year when the TTC selected the CLRV design. No Municipal Service Car prototypes were ever produced and only concept drawings remain of this vehicle.

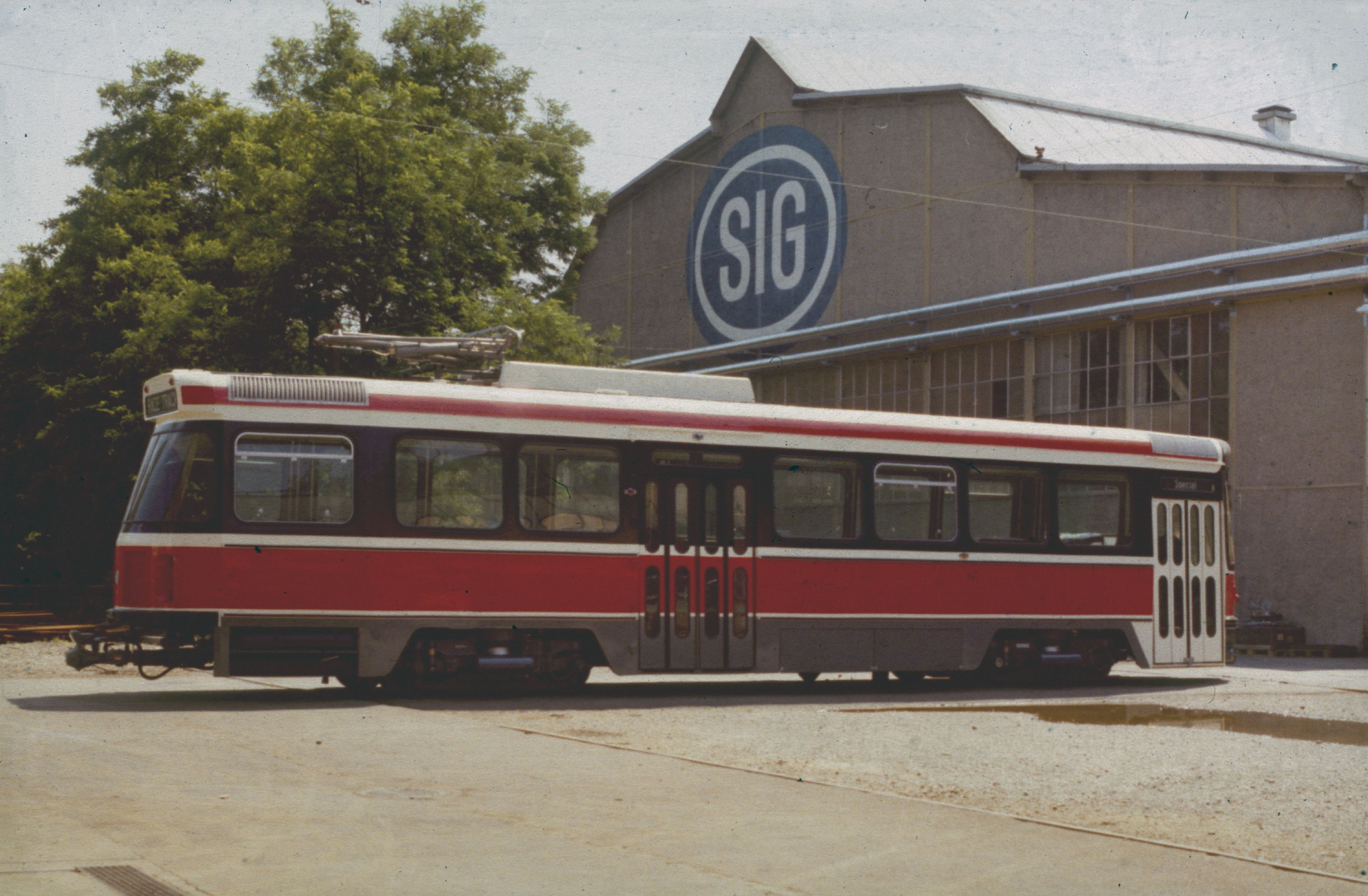
A completed CLRV rolls off the production lines at SIG in Neuhausen.

The first six CLRV cars (4000–4005) were manufactured by SIG of Zürich, Switzerland, and used as prototypes for Urban Transportation Development Corporation (UTDC) (now Bombardier) to manufacture subsequent CLRVs at the Thunder Bay works of Hawker Siddeley Canada (today also part of Bombardier). The original order was for 200 CLRVs, of which ten were to be built by SIG and 190 by Hawker Siddeley. However, the order was reduced by four vehicles to 196 in order to provide parts to construct a prototype Articulated Light Rail Vehicle (number 4900). The four CLRVs removed were from the SIG portion of the order; thus, there were no CLRVs numbered 4006–4009. The 190 Hawker Siddeley CLRVs were numbered 4010–4199. CLRV car 4000 had a pantograph when being tested by SIG on the Orbe-Chavornay railway and was converted to trolley pole before being delivered to Toronto.

On December 29, 1977, the first CLRV, SIG-built 4002, arrived at the Hillcrest Complex aboard a railway flatcar. On September 30, 1979, after a year of testing and modification, CLRVs started service on route 507 Long Branch (today the western portion of route 501 Queen). The second route to use CLRVs was 511 Bathurst, on February 29, 1980, and they subsequently entered service on 512 St. Clair on April 16, 503 Kingston Rd on June 9, 502 Downtowner on August 7, 1980, and 501 Queen on January 4, 1981. By December 8, 1980, 89 cars had been accepted for service.

Twenty-two CLRVs were to run on an open-track Scarborough LRT line (which was later built as an ICTS line instead). Thus, for suburban operation, the UTDC originally specified an outside-frame bogie that later proved problematic in street operation, and designed the vehicles for speeds up to 110 kilometres per hour (70 mph). The bogies would derail at switches in street trackage and have noise and vibration problems. Replacing the original Bochum wheels with SAB wheels (similar to PCC wheels) corrected these problems. The Bochum wheels had a rubber layer between the hub and the steel tire (rim), which would flex rather than pulling the opposite wheel through a single-point switch.

The CLRV electronics include 1970s-era solid state power controls. In later years, the propulsion control system became unreliable and difficult to maintain as obsolete electronic and electrical parts became difficult to source.

The CLRVs originally had sealed windows and no air conditioning. Later, the windows were modified to allow passengers to open them.

The CLRVs were delivered with couplers for multiple-unit operation. Between 1984 and 1988, the couplers were removed, and a safety shield was placed over the front coupler pocket.

=== ALRV ===
As with the CLRV prototypes, the ALRV prototype, numbered 4900, was tested with a pantograph on standard gauge tracks before delivery to the TTC. Built in 1982, prototype 4900 had features that were not implemented on either CLRVs or production ALRVs such as hand controls instead of foot controls, and electronic destination signs instead of Mylar rollsigns. The prototype had couplers while subsequent production units did not.

Prototype 4900 ran trials in Toronto from August 10, 1982, until February 25, 1983, with a break when it was displayed at the 1982 Canadian National Exhibition. After completion of the trial runs, car 4900 was stored at the St. Clair Carhouse until March 7, 1987, when it was shipped to the UTDC testing facility in Kingston, Ontario. On March 24, 1988, following a test run, it was rear-ended by another streetcar on the test track and suffered extensive damage. It was scrapped in 1997.

The 52 production ALRV cars were built by UTDC using bogies and articulations supplied by MAN SE of Germany. Assembly of the first 11 cars took place in Thunder Bay, while that of the remaining 41 cars took place in Kingston. They are numbered 4200–4251.

The first production ALRV, number 4200, was shipped to Toronto on June 11, 1987. It underwent further testing and modifications after its arrival. Car 4204 was the first of the production ALRVs to go into revenue service, doing so on the 507 Long Branch route on January 19, 1988.

=== Marketing ===
The UTDC had only one other buyer for its light rail products, Santa Clara County Transit (now known as the Santa Clara Valley Transportation Authority), in San Jose, California, which purchased 50 vehicles in 1987. These cars were double-ended, articulated, and used pantograph collection, all of which were configurable options offered for the CLRV by the UTDC, as was high-platform boarding, which neither city used.

In 1980, cars 4027, 4029 and 4031 were leased and tested by the Massachusetts Bay Transportation Authority (MBTA), in Boston, to run on the Green Line. To operate in Boston, the streetcars had to be regauged and skipped Kenmore station when operating on the C and D branches as the CLRVs do not have any doors on the left side. During this time, the cars were occasionally operated as two- and three-car trains. Ultimately, the MBTA did not adopt the CLRV design for its light rail fleet.

The US Standard Light Rail Vehicle program was largely unsuccessful, with the resulting cars proving unreliable and troublesome to both transit systems that had purchased them. While the CLRV gave relatively more reliable performance for the TTC and SCVTA, their large amount of components that became proprietary as a result would make the cars increasingly more difficult and costly to maintain as they aged.

In 2004, the Santa Clara VTA replaced their UTDC cars with low-floor LRVs and sold the former fleet to SacRT light rail in Sacramento and TRAX in Salt Lake City. The cars were retired from service in both Salt Lake City and Sacramento in 2018 and 2022, respectively.

== Characteristics ==
The design and operation of the CLRVs and ALRVs carried over features from the highly successful PCCs that they replaced, having a similar interior layout, and the same two green bull's-eye lights in the upper corners of the front, above the destination sign, which uses back-lit roller boards. Braking and acceleration were controlled by the operator with the same pedal layout used on the PCC's, including the dead man's switch which was used to apply the parking brake when the vehicle was not in motion.

Other features include fluorescent lighting and chopper controls to save energy.

Claude Gidman, the former chairman of industrial design at the Ontario College of Art & Design (now OCAD University), was involved in the design for the CLRV. He created the colour scheme for the streetcar, including its distinctive crimson red colour, to make the CLRV noticeable on the streets and to continue the "Red Rocket" tradition in colouring. He also proposed that the front seats of the streetcar be angled inward, an idea that was abandoned.

Unlike the CLRVs, the ALRVs have a large box sitting on the roof of each of the two articulated sections. Each box houses an air intake to ventilate the larger ALRV interior. All of the TTC's ALRVs were delivered without couplers, and a safety shield covers both of the empty front and rear coupler pockets. Compared with the CLRVs, the ALRVs had limited acceleration due to their extra weight and because trolley pole pickup limited the amount of power they could draw.

When the CLRVs and ALRVs were delivered in the 1970s and 1980s respectively, they were equipped with gongs as the sole audible warning signal. Most cars were retrofitted with horns in the late 1990s to combat automobile accidents when the 510 Spadina right-of-way streetcar opened. Initially, the horns were salvaged from retired H1 and M1 subway cars which were replaced by the T1 subway cars. However, during the CLRV/ALRV streetcar fleet overhaul project between 2011 and 2012 the TTC reconfigured the streetcar horns with new air horns or automobile-type electric horns.

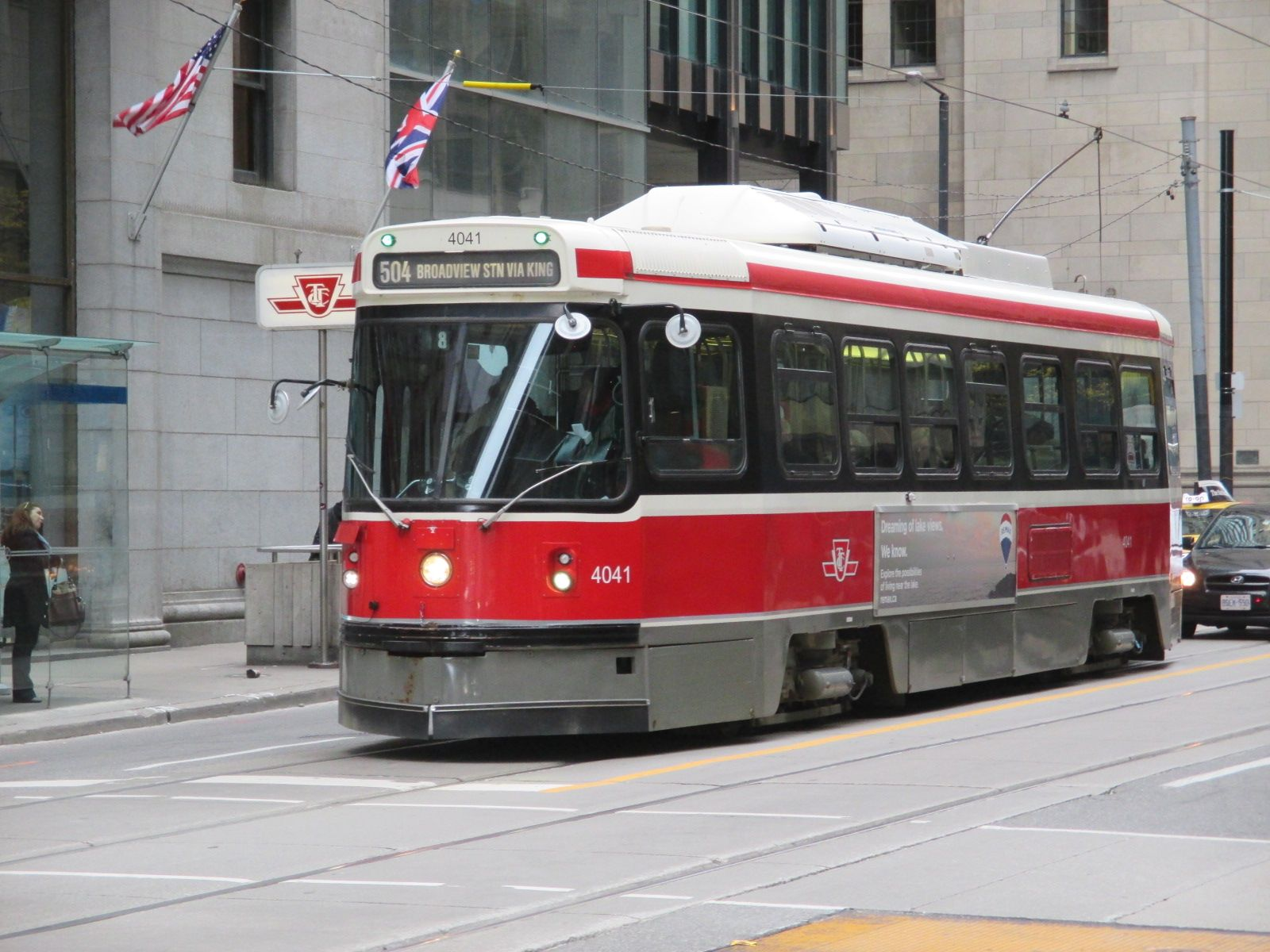
CLRV 4041 with roof-mounted air conditioning unit

CLRV 4041 is the only member of the CLRV/ALRV fleet to have an air conditioning unit, which the TTC installed in 2006. The unit was a long roof-mounted box with beveled sides that gave 4041 a look distinct from that of other CLRVs. TTC operator Stanley Mamaraj described 4041's air conditioning as "The cool air comes down. You can feel it, it's nice and cool." However, after a ride on 4041, transit advocate Steve Munro described the air conditioning as "nowhere near as aggressive as it is on some buses or on the T1 subway cars. Moreover, depending on where you are in the car, you may not feel the effect at all because the cool air does not blow out evenly. When I rode back north on a non-A/C car, I sat beside the open window and was actually cooler than I had been on 4041."

Starting in 2006, the TTC installed a closed-circuit television (CCTV) security camera system on all surface vehicles including the CLRV/ALRV fleet as well as buses. The system is to deter crime on vehicles and help catch trouble-makers. It uses four cameras to make high-quality images stored in a 24-hour loop.

Until at least 2014, CLRV/ALRV streetcars, as well as buses, used a 1970s, pager-like communication system for Transit Control to communicate with operators. It was essentially a text-based system that could send messages to 10 vehicles at a time, and each operator had to acknowledge the message before Transit Control could communicate with other operators. In 2014, the TTC requested funding for a new radio system.

A promotional graphic published by the TTC in 2009 illustrated that an ALRV could replace 55 automobiles carrying 61 passengers (assuming 1.11 passengers per auto) during the AM rush.

From December 2015, the CLRVs and ALRVs accepted fare payments by Presto card and have since been installed system-wide including all TTC buses and subway stations as of December 2016.

To coincide with the Presto rollout on the CLRV/ALRV fleets, the TTC also introduced a proof-of-payment (POP) system across all streetcar routes in the TTC network (including the CLRV and ALRV streetcar fleets and the aforementioned replacement shuttle buses that operate in place of streetcars) in an effort to speed up services. The POP system allows riders with proof of payment—such as a paper transfer, TTC pass or Presto card—to board at any door of the vehicle. Riders are subject to random fare inspections, and riders paying by cash or token continue to have to board at the front door of the vehicle to pay at the farebox and are required to take a paper POP transfer from the driver to show when requested.

== Operator training ==
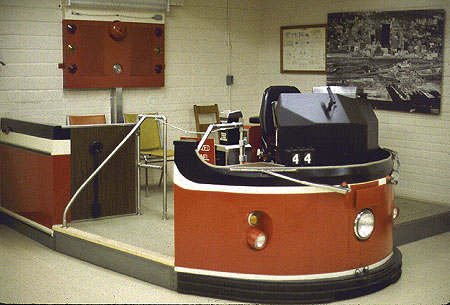
The TTC's LRV training simulator, located at the Hillcrest Complex

A mockup of a CLRV which was used to train new streetcar operators is located at Hillcrest. The training simulator consisted of an operator cab, front steps and part of the front of a streetcar.

Operators also train with a real streetcar. The signs on the vehicle identify it as a training car.

== Later years ==
In 2014, the CLRV and ALRV streetcars began being retired and replaced by low-floor Flexity Outlook vehicles, the first of which were put into service on the 510 Spadina route. The replacements were initiated on the basis of the older vehicles being inaccessible to those with disabilities as well as the age and declining reliability of the CLRV and ALRV fleets.

=== Accessibility ===
The CLRV/ALRV cars, like the PCCs, had high floors and steps at every doorway, and were therefore not wheelchair accessible, severely limiting their use by people with physical disabilities. Furthermore, the doors were separated by vertical stanchions in the centre of each doorway, making each opening too narrow to accommodate wheelchairs, making accessibility retrofits more difficult and costly. With the passage of the Accessibility for Ontarians with Disabilities Act (AODA) mandating all public transport to be fully accessible by 2025, the TTC saw the need to replace them with accessible vehicles as early as 2005. TTC staff explored a number of possible means to make the old fleet wheelchair-accessible, including constructing level boarding platforms, lowering the track level, installing wheelchair lifts, and attaching wheelchair-accessible trailers, but concluded that none of these options were practical, and replacing the cars was the best option.

In 2008, the TTC installed automatic stop announcements on all surface vehicles, including the CLRVs and ALRVs, to satisfy the requirements of the AODA. An LED device displays stop names in text, accompanied by a recorded voice announcing the stop names. This is to aid riders with hearing and vision problems. In 2016, the TTC announced it would also install external announcement systems on all of its surface vehicle fleet, again including the CLRVs and ALRVs, to announce the route and destination of the vehicle to passengers waiting to board.

A TTC report in 2015 proposed that it may have continued to use some high-floor inaccessible CLRV/ALRV vehicles to supplement the low-floor Flexity Outlook streetcars during peak hours on selected routes either until approximately 2024, when projections indicated it would have enough of the Flexity vehicles available to provide accessible service on all streetcar routes or if they become impractical to maintain. By May 2019, however, the TTC planned to retire the remainder of the CLRV/ALRV fleet by the end of 2019.

=== Winter operational issues ===
During the polar vortex winter seasons of 2013/2014, 2014/2015, 2017/2018 and 2018/2019, many of the CLRV and ALRV streetcars broke down due to their age when operating in temperatures below −20 °C (−4 °F). On one of the worst days in January 2014, 48 streetcars failed to run for the morning rush hour. On December 28, 2017, when the temperature was again −20 °C, 45 older streetcars could not leave the carhouse. During an extreme cold snap from January 20 to 22, 2019, the TTC withdrew all CLRV/ALRV cars from service due to the high risk of the cars breaking down in the cold weather. Instead, only Flexity Outlook streetcars along with buses were used. The ALRVs remained out of service for the rest of that winter season.

The older streetcars use pressurized air passing through tubes and valves to operate such things as suspension, braking, windshield wipers, doors and the rail sander (for traction under icy conditions). Condensation can freeze and block the air tubes causing a variety of malfunctions. Over time, salt erodes the air tanks and the tubing gets brittle and leaks leading to less efficient air flow which may cause the compressor beneath the tail of the car to overheat and break down.

To address these problems in December 2015, the TTC performed fixes taking 2–3 days per streetcar to implement. These included the installation of new air tanks and filters, the replacement of old tubing to the windshield wipers, repairs on the valves controlling air flow to the rail sanders, overhaul of the brake valves, and the correction of any suspension system deficiencies.

=== Replacement parts ===
As the TTC's CLRV/ALRV streetcar fleet aged, many parts used by these older streetcars were no longer available from outside suppliers. If a CLRV or ALRV was damaged in a breakdown, collision or derailment, parts needed to be replaced or be bent back into shape. For this purpose, the TTC employed a blacksmith to craft and repair parts. The blacksmith also supplied tools such as switch irons and towing drawbars for streetcars.

The use of salt brine to de-ice city streets corroded parts on the older streetcars so much that such parts often had to be cut off the car. The TTC Harvey Shops had to manufacture some of the replacements sections, such as the chevrons which attach bogies to the car body. The upholstery department constructed the bellows used between the articulated sections of the ALRV. Each set of bellows took 240 hours to construct from a vinyl-like material using electric sewing machines.

=== Refurbishment ===
In 2006, the TTC was planning to refurbish 100 CLRVs to extend their life and possibly to add air conditioning. This plan was shelved by December 2016, and the only visible outcome was that CLRV 4041, effectively a prototype for refurbishment, became the only CLRV with air conditioning, sporting a visually distinct air conditioning unit on its roof.

In June 2015, the TTC started a program to rebuild and extend the life of 30 CLRVs and 30 ALRVs because of delays in delivery of the new Flexity streetcars. 56 employees were assigned to work on this program. Refurbishing each ALRV was expected to take about 55 days and cost $800,000. The cost for each CLRV was expected to be about $200,000. The total cost was budgeted at $33.1 million. The work was to be completed by 2017.

The refurbishment of 30 ALRVs alone was budgeted at $24.5 million, with an option to refurbish another 10. The remaining 12 ALRVs were to be stripped of useful parts and scrapped. The refurbishments included repairing corrosion, repainting, installing new energy-efficient LED lights, upgrading the floors, refreshing the seats, and overhauling the pneumatic, brake and traction systems. This was expected to extend the life of the cars until 2024. The first renovated ALRV (4217) entered service on October 15, 2015. However, the TTC stopped the ALRV refurbishment program after completing 20 cars at a cost of $26 million. The TTC hoped to have 10 of the refurbished ALRVs in service on any given day, but found that only two or three were fit for service with the others awaiting repairs mainly due to electrical problems. Because of budget constraints, the refurbishing had excluded electrical work.

=== Decline ===
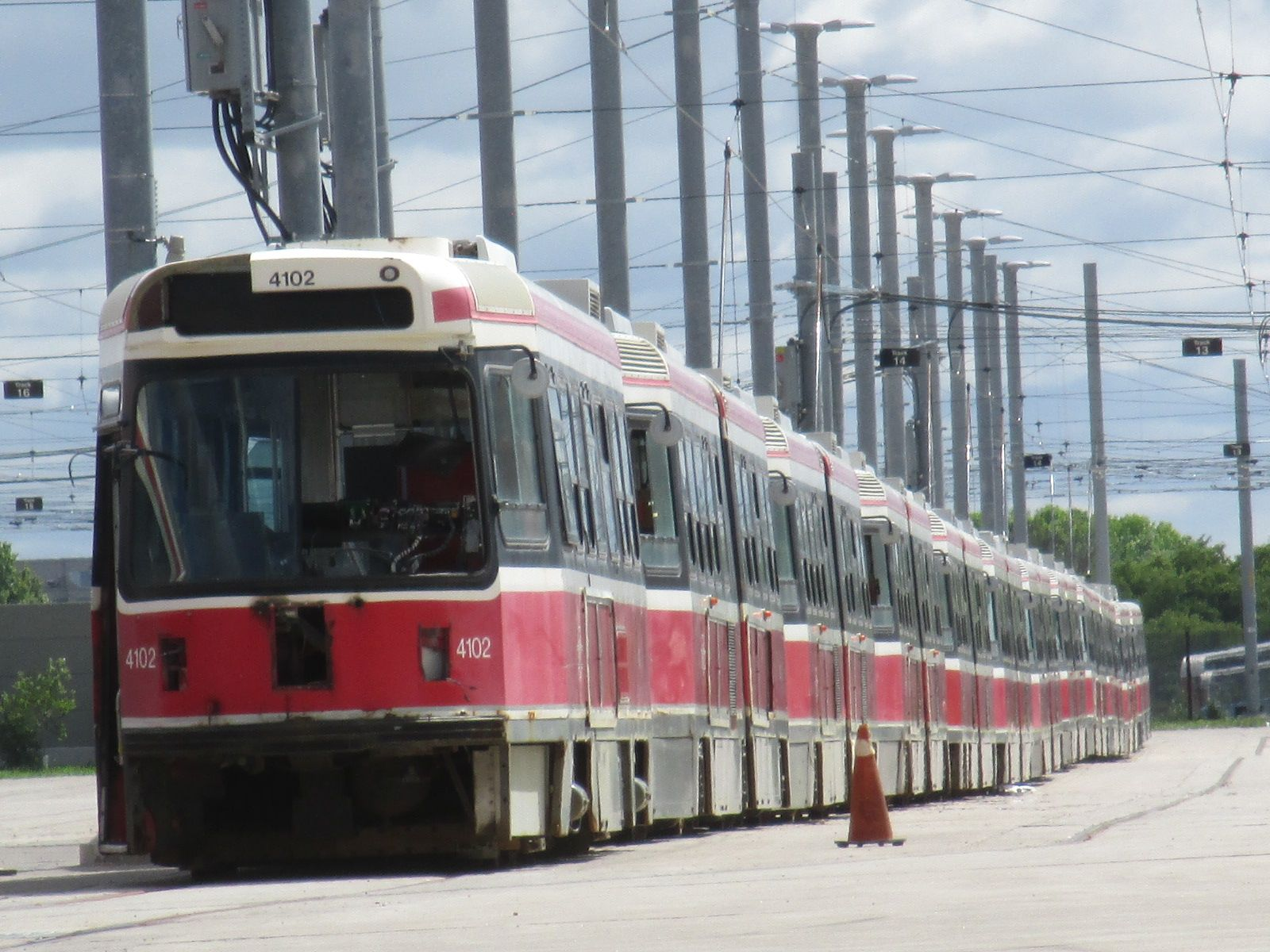
Line of retired CLRVs and ALRVs at the Leslie Barns. Note that CLRV 4102 (retired 2017) is missing parts.

The CLRV and ALRV cars began being retired from service as the Flexity low-floor streetcars arrived and began service. A TTC report in 2015 projected that the last of the older-model vehicles would be retired by 2024. By January 2017, only 170 of the 200 CLRVs and ALRVs could be put into service because of the extra maintenance they required.

In 2016, the TTC proposed using 30 to 40 ALRVs to supplement Flexity streetcars until 2024 to address increased ridership until 60 more low-floor streetcars could be ordered. By September 2018, the CLRV fleet had so deteriorated that the TTC indicated they intended to use ALRVs to supplement some rush-hour services on the busier streetcar lines intended to be operated with CLRVs only. The ALRV fleet was sidelined between February and April 2019. In May, the TTC ran the ALRV fleet for 926 km (575 mi), during which time one ALRV had a failure in its compressed air system. In mid-2019, the remaining ALRV fleet (about 6 or 7 vehicles) remained on standby as spare vehicles for supplemental service.

By June 23, 2019, Flexity Outlook streetcars had fully replaced CLRVs on route 501 Queen between Neville Park Loop and Humber Loop. CLRVs continued to serve the route between Humber Loop and Long Branch Loop (operated as a separate branch of route 501) until Flexity streetcars had fully replaced them by September 1, 2019.

The last day of operation for the ALRVs was September 2, 2019. On that date, ALRVs 4204 and 4207 made commemorative last runs during the afternoon along Queen Street between Russell Carhouse (Queen and Greenwood) and Wolseley Loop (Bathurst and Queen) with free rides to mark the occasion.

In September 2019, 44 CLRVs were in service. In that month, only routes 506 Carlton and 511 Bathurst were using them.

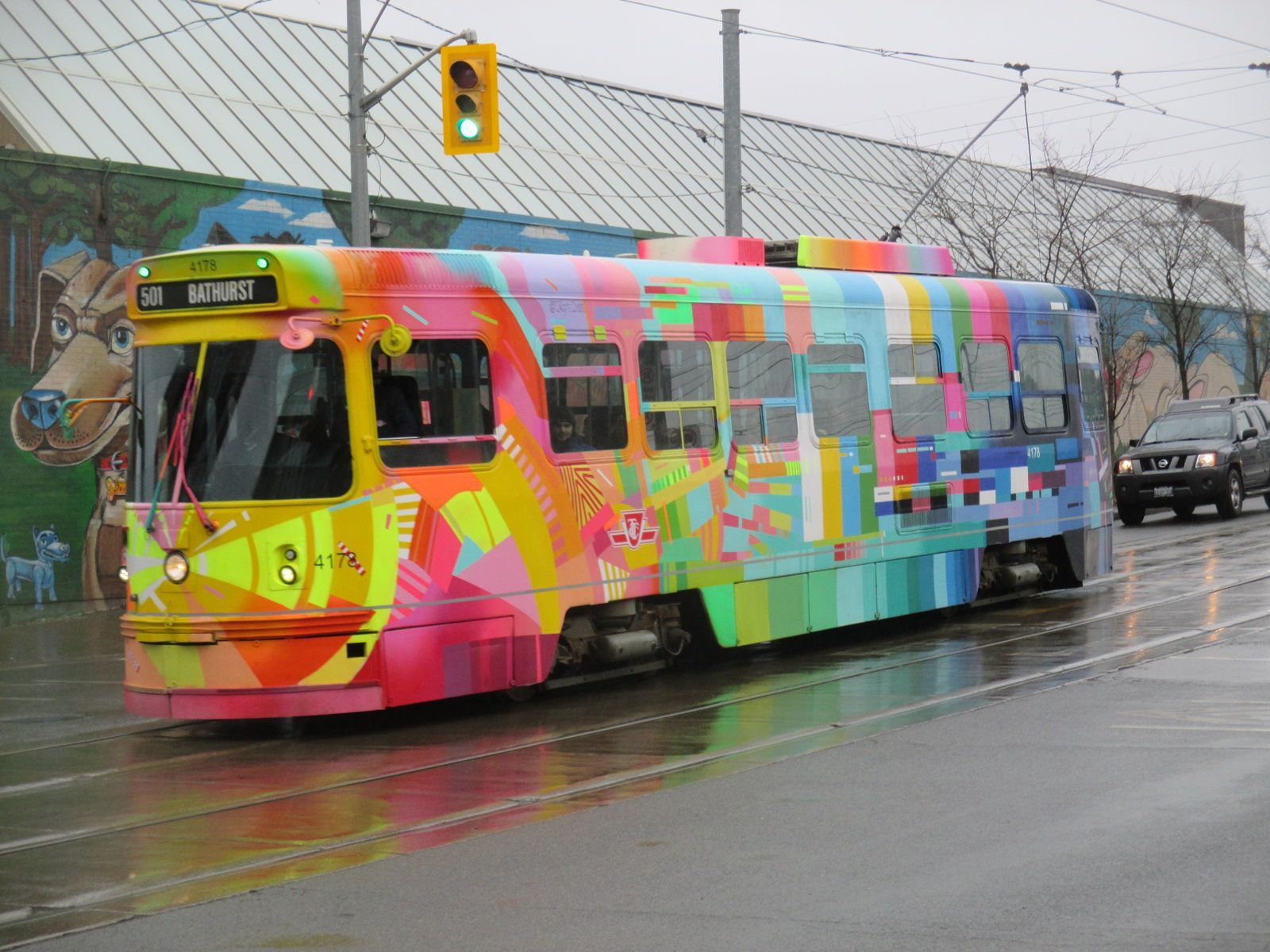
CLRV 4178 (the Streetcar Named Toronto) on the last day of CLRV service

In September 2019, an artist group repainted CLRV 4178 at the Hillcrest Complex in bright colours, replacing its regular red and white livery. The repainting project was dubbed "A Streetcar Named Toronto" and is intended to make 4178 a moving artwork. Leaves in red and white were painted on the streetcar's floor and the ceiling was painted with a floral pattern. The artist group changed the colour of some seat covers and added photographs in the interior. The repainted streetcar ran until the end of the year on regular routes as well as for special events such as Nuit Blanche. The streetcar was expected to be scrapped after its retirement, but was ultimately preserved by the Halton County Radial Railway.

By October 2019, only 18 CLRVs were still in service. By late November 2019, CLRV service seven days per week was planned only for 511 Bathurst. The TTC announced that it would continue to run CLRVs on that route until December 28, but it would also use some CLRVs as extra vehicles on 501 Queen between Bathurst Street and Greenwood Avenue on weekends from November 24 to December 28.

The last day of service for the CLRVs was December 29, 2019. On that day, the TTC offered free service on the CLRVs along Queen Street between 10am and 2pm to commemorate the occasion. At 3 pm, three CLRVs made a last commemorative run carrying invited guests from the Wolseley Loop to the Russell Carhouse. Of the six CLRVs running that day, CLRV 4001 was the last to return to Russell Carhouse.

The TTC has retained two CLRVs and an ALRV for special occasions and charters. Other CLRVs will be sold to various transit museums across North America or will be sold as scrap. In July 2020, the TTC indicated it will convert CLRVs 4081 and 4124 into work cars. In 2025, the TTC plans to retrofit one CLRV with a pantograph with the option of retrofitting five more of the vehicles, in order to enable their operation on the streetcar network, which now only supports pantographs.

The TTC sold CLRV 4187 at auction to a private individual (Note: Student and UrbanToronto member Alexander Glista) for static display at Glista Family Farms in Priceville, Ontario. As a condition of sale, the TTC stripped the car of its TTC logo. The buyer paid $3,400 for the car, the minimum allowed bid, but shipping increases that cost to an estimated $8,000. The new owner plans to preserve the streetcar's interior, and has constructed a short strip of track to mount the vehicle.

=== Decommissioning ===
Some noteworthy retired vehicles that were scrapped include:

Decommissioning schedule as of February 2019
Year	CLRV	ALRV	Total
2013	1	0	1
2014	1	1	2
2015	7	4	7
2016	16	1	21
2017	30	3	30
2018	28	28	59
2019	113	14	128
Total	196	52	248

- CLRV 4063 was the first to be retired. In 2006, it was intended to be the first prototype for the TTC's CLRV overhaul program, which was to include a complete reconstruction of the body as well as new propulsion and control systems. However, after the car was stripped, the overhaul program was cancelled. Because of a diminishing supply of spare parts for the active fleet, it was decided that the unit would be scrapped and all usable parts be salvaged for repairs to the existing fleet. The shell was sold for scrap in March 2009 to Future Enterprises of Hamilton, Ontario.
- ALRV 4231 was retired in mid-2014 and was used to supply parts until its scrapping in May 2015. It was the first ALRV to be retired and scrapped.
- CLRV 4062 was the second CLRV retired after it suffered a serious collision with TTC bus 7807 on December 27, 2014. Previously, the TTC repaired CLRVs damaged in collisions, even those heavily damaged. Instead, CLRV 4062 was retired in January 2015.
- CLRV 4162, retired in March 2015, was the third CLRV to be retired but the first to be so because of age, wear and tear.
- CLRV 4005 was retired in May 2015 and scrapped in July 2015. It was the first of the six SIG-built CLRVs to be retired.
- CLRV 4000, the first CLRV by number and one of the six CLRVs built by SIG, was shipped to a Hamilton scrap yard from the Leslie Barns on December 9, 2017.

=== Preservation ===
TTC no.	Model/builder	Owner	Location	Status	Notes
4001	CLRV, SIG	Toronto Transit Commission	Toronto, Ontario	Operational	Preserved as a heritage vehicle for future special events, such as charters and parades. Sent to Halton County Radial Railway on February 4, 2025, for temporary storage.
4003	CLRV, SIG	Halton County Radial Railway	Rockwood, Ontario	Operational	Donated
4010	CLRV, UTDC	Halton County Radial Railway	Rockwood, Ontario	Operational	Donated
4024	CLRV, UTDC	American Industrial Mining Company Museum	Brownsville, Pennsylvania	Operational	Donated
4034	CLRV, UTDC	Illinois Railway Museum	Union, Illinois	Operational	Acquired by museum in November 2019; to be regauged for standard gauge trackage.
4039	CLRV, UTDC	Halton County Radial Railway	Rockwood, Ontario	Operational	Donated
4040	CLRV, UTDC	Halton County Radial Railway	Rockwood, Ontario	Parts only	Auctioned off via GovDeals. Used for storage.
4053	CLRV, UTDC	Halton County Radial Railway	Rockwood, Ontario	Awaiting restoration	Auctioned off via GovDeals. Used for storage. To be restored and used for service at Halton County Radial Railway.
4068	CLRV, UTDC	Seashore Trolley Museum	Kennebunkport, Maine	Operational	Donated, to be regauged for standard gauge trackage.
4089	CLRV, UTDC	Toronto Transit Commission	Toronto, Ontario	Operational	Preserved as a heritage vehicle for future events, such as charters and parades. Sent to Halton County Radial Railway in February 2025, for temporary storage.
4133	CLRV, UTDC	Halton County Radial Railway	Rockwood, Ontario	Parts only	Originally under ownership of Seashore Trolley Museum, the car was later transferred to HCRY and is to be scrapped sometime in the future.
4170	CLRV, UTDC	American Industrial Mining Company Museum	Brownsville, Pennsylvania	Operational	Donated
4178	CLRV, UTDC	Halton County Radial Railway	Rockwood, Ontario	Operational	Specially repainted in September 2019; Donated.
4187	CLRV, UTDC	Glista Family Farms	Priceville, Ontario	Static	Purchased for preservation by a streetcar fan. TTC logos removed.
4204	ALRV, UTDC	Halton County Radial Railway	Rockwood, Ontario	Operational	Donated
4207	ALRV, UTDC	Toronto Transit Commission	Toronto, Ontario	Operational	Preserved as a heritage vehicle for future special events, such as charters and parades. Sent to Halton County Radial Railway on February 27, 2025, for temporary storage.

== Gallery ==
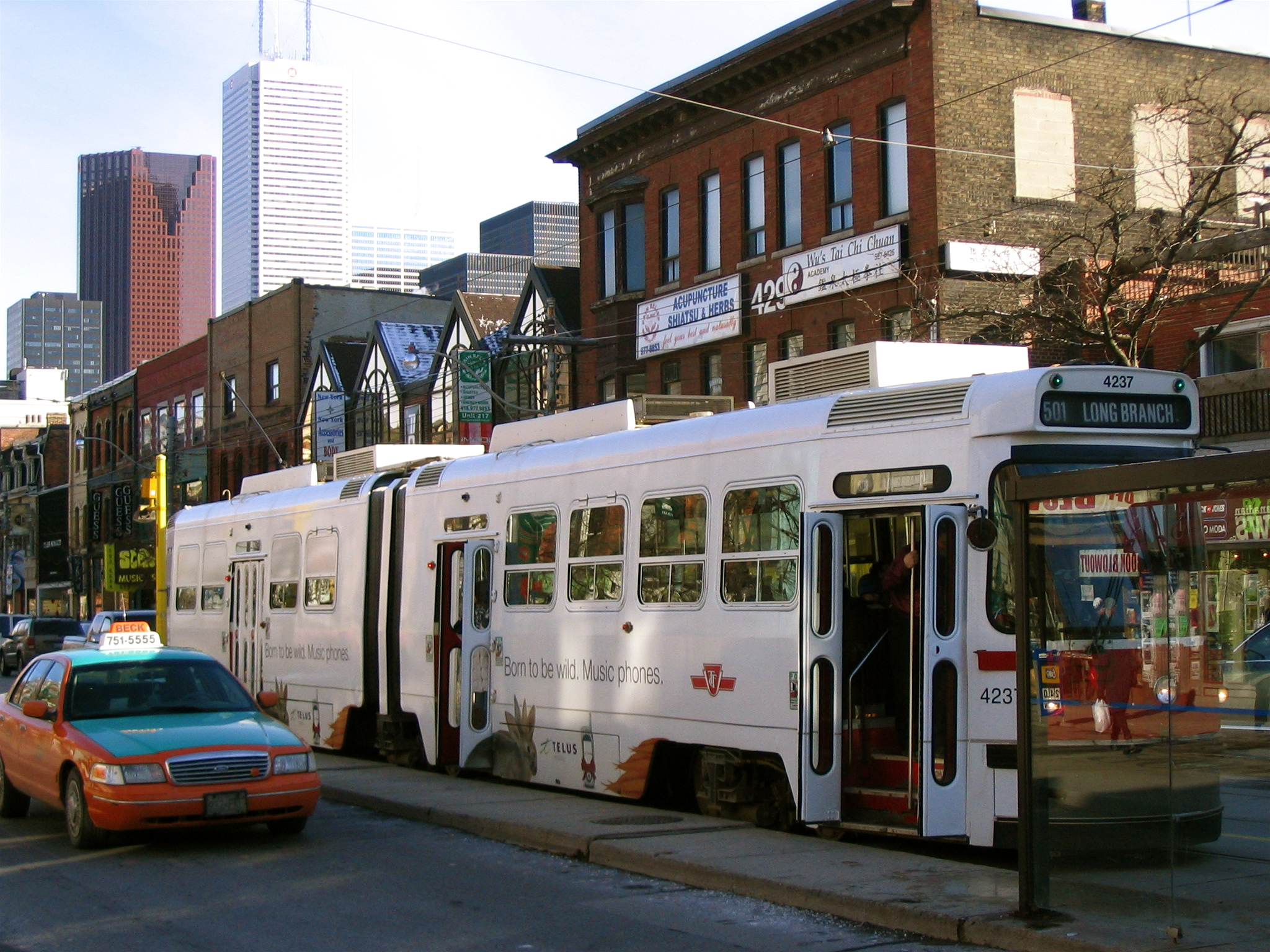
ALRV on a 501 Queen route at Queen Street West

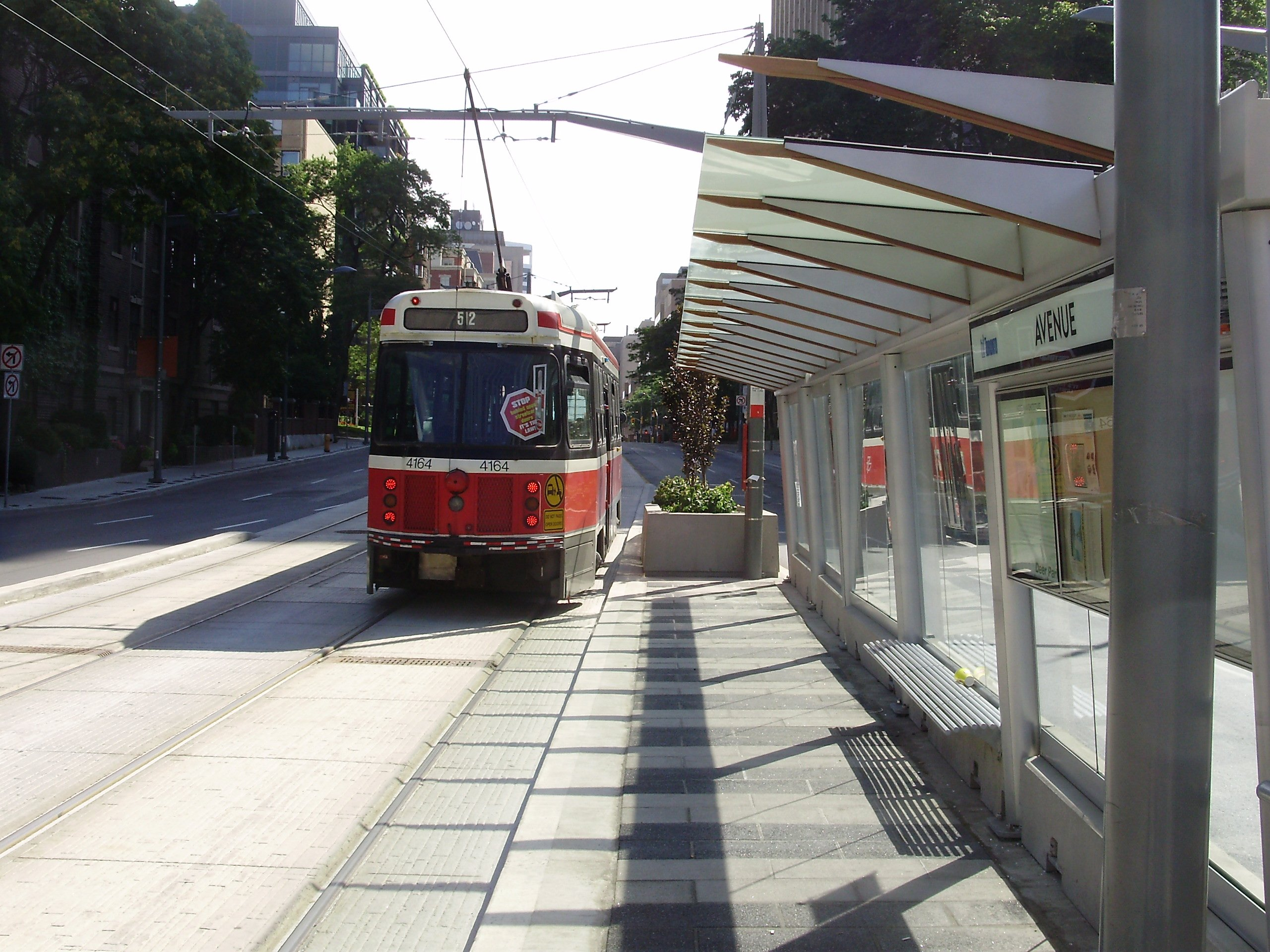
CLRV on a 512 St. Clair route at St. Clair Avenue West

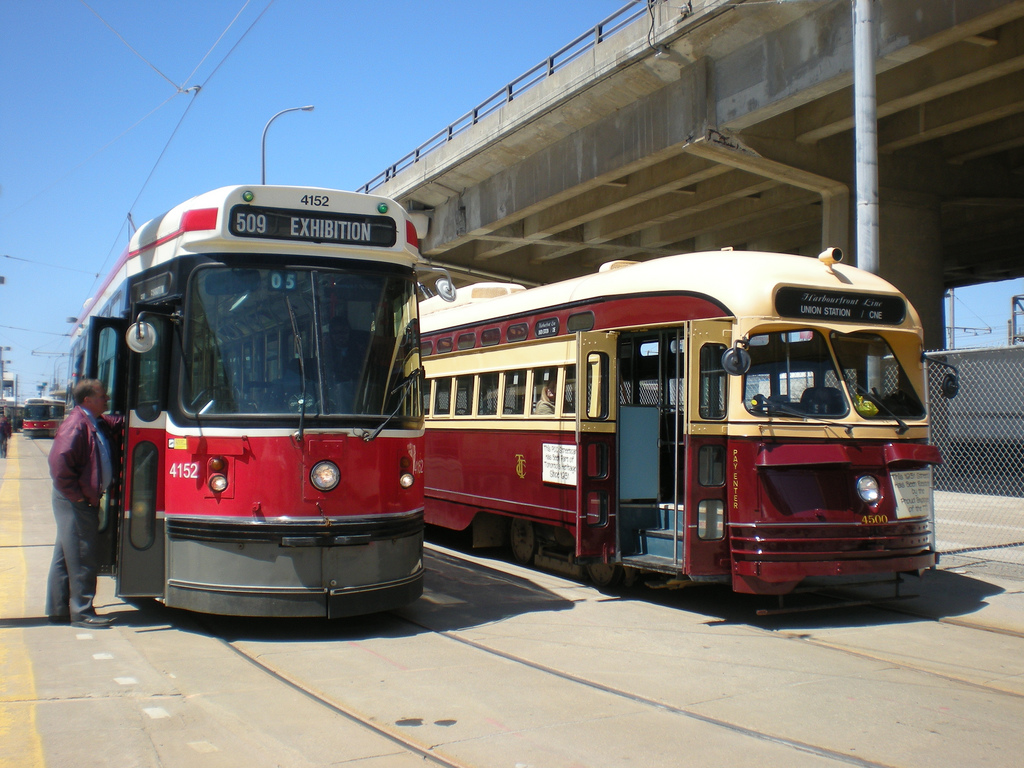
CLRV with PCC at Exhibition Loop

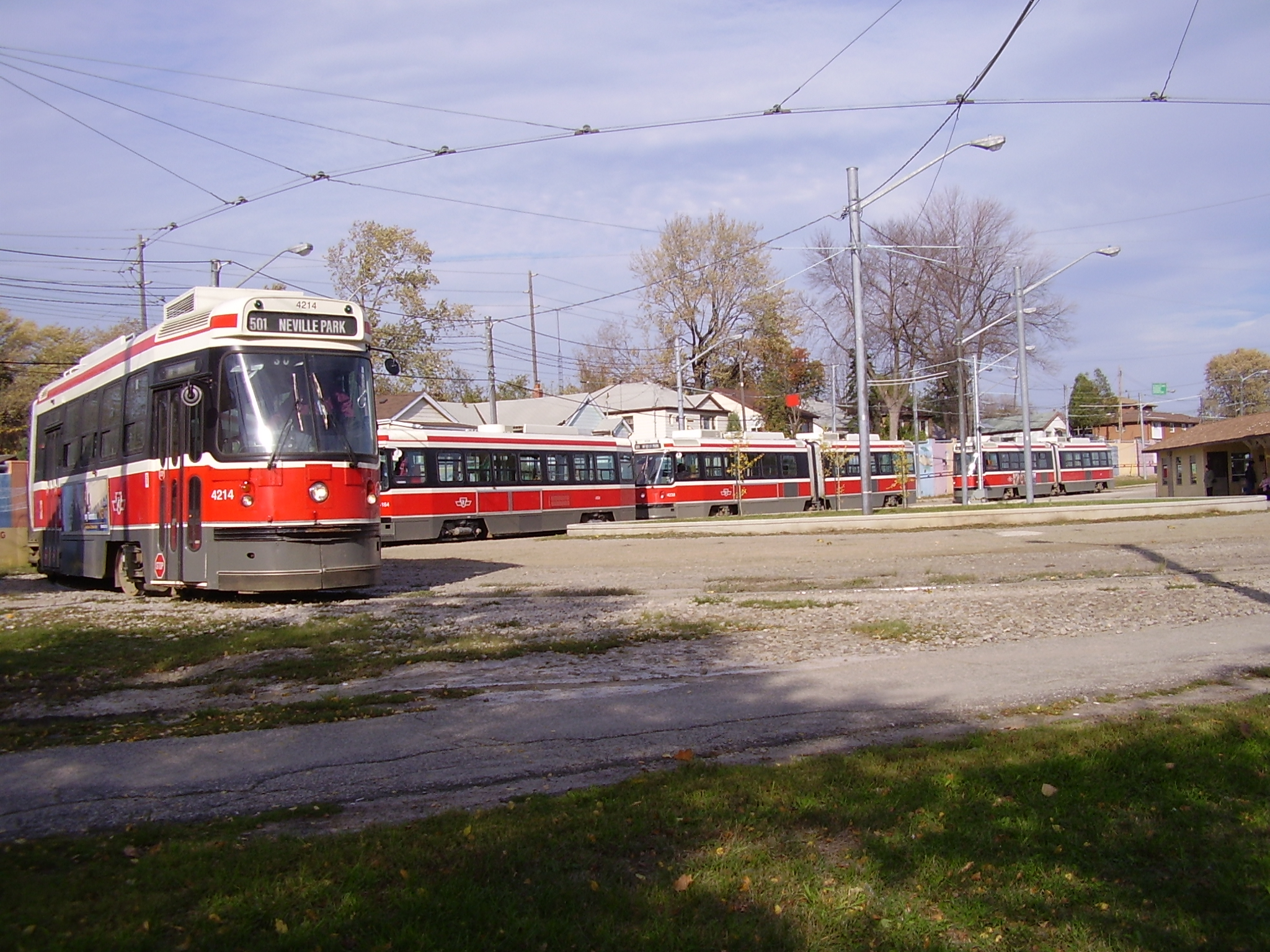
ALRVs stopped at Long Branch Loop

== See also ==
- Light rail vehicle

=== Similar vehicles ===
- US Standard Light Rail Vehicle, a similar, though unsuccessful, attempt to build a standardized PCC successor in the US.
- Kawasaki Heavy Industries Rolling Stock Company Type K LRV for SEPTA to replace PCC streetcars and similar to the CLRV
- VTA light rail, which used a somewhat similar car design also produced by UTDC.
