= GO-ALRT =

Proposed light rail system

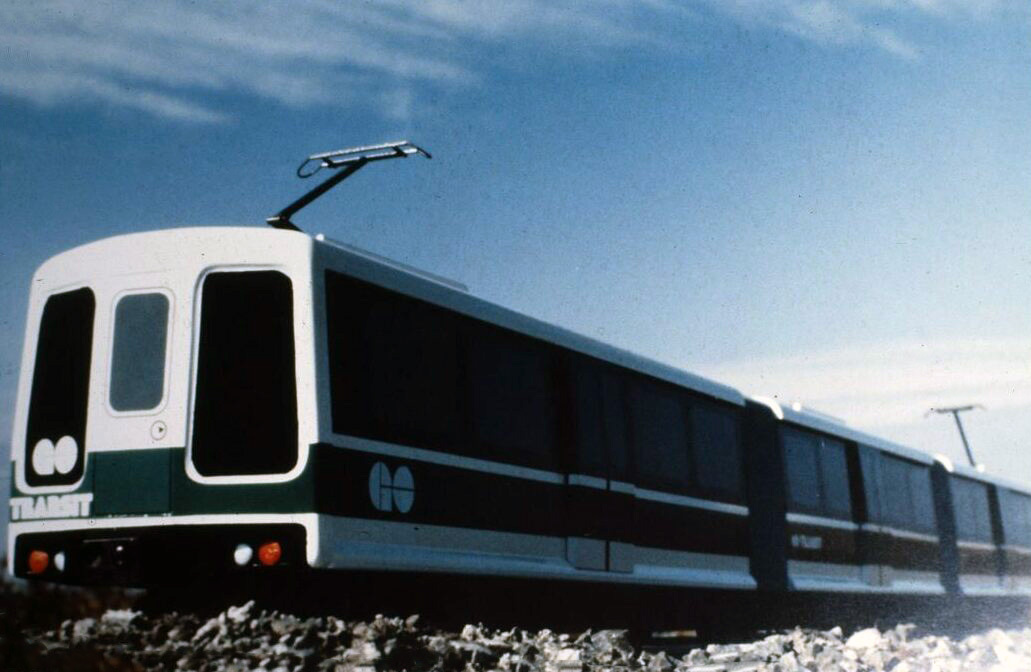
- Proposed GO-ALRT trainset, c. 1982

Overview
- Status: Cancelled
- Owner: GO Transit
- Locale: Greater Toronto, Ontario
- Termini: Hamilton; Oshawa
- Stations: 25+

Service
- Type: Rapid transit
- System: GO Transit
- Services: 2
- Operator(s): GO Transit
- Rolling stock: modified ICTS-series (articulated)
- Daily ridership: 25,000 (avg. weekday)

Technical
- Line length: 200 km (120 mi) (approximate)
- Track gauge: 1,435 mm (4 ft 8 1/2 in)
- Electrification: Overhead catenary
- Operating speed: 120 km/h (75 mph)

Government of Ontario Advanced Light Rail Transit (GO-ALRT) was a proposed rapid transit project by GO Transit in the Greater Toronto Area. It was first introduced in 1982 but was cancelled in 1985 due to budget cuts during the Miller ministry. The project included utilizing a new electric train to provide interurban service (at the time referred to as "inter-regional rapid transit") along existing and new GO corridors.

The proposed transit was based on an enlarged UTDC ICTS vehicle designed to offer a compromise between passenger capacity and the level of infrastructure required.

Several of the proposed lines were later implemented using conventional heavy rail systems, including the eastern portion of the Lakeshore East GO train service route from Pickering station to Whitby station in the Durham Region.

== Fleet ==
A number of vehicle design concepts were considered during the project, with an initial design similar to the Mark 1 ICTS vehicle. Later modifications made the vehicle larger and longer. Such a vehicle was planned to be designed and built by UTDC, although the crown corporation was sold off to Lavalin Inc. in 1986 and became known as UTDC Inc. It was then sold to Bombardier in 1992.

== Rolling stock ==
Inter Regional Rapid Transit Vehicle Mark 1
- Manufacturer: Urban Transportation Development Corporation
- Constructed: 1980s
- Number built: None
- Formation: 2 car trains (1 set permanently mated articulated pair)
- Capacity: 124 or 147 seated, 42+ standing
- Operator: GO Transit
- Line served: ALRT

Specifications
- Car body construction: Aluminum
- Car length: 36.0 m (118 ft 1 in) or 47.5 m (155 ft 10 in)
- Width: 2.8 m (9 ft 2 in)
- Height: 3.9 m (12 ft 10 in)
- Doors: 8 or 12 per married unit
- Maximum speed: Design: 120 km/h (75 mph), Service: 70 km/h (43 mph)
- Weight: 57,050 kg (125,770 lb)
- Acceleration: 1.3 m/s^{2} (4.3 ft/s^{2})
- Electric system: Overhead catenary
- Current collection: Pantograph
- Track gauge: 1,435 mm (4 ft 8 1/2 in) standard gauge

The proposed line would have used a modified version of the Urban Transportation Development Corporation's ICTS car, which would undergo about two additional railcar vehicle redesigns throughout the program's iteration. This proposed vehicle was to be a two-car articulated vehicle, as opposed to two individual cars with articulated bogies. The original vehicle design consisted of a unit of three married articulated ICTS cars forming a single train. The dimensions of the cars increased as time progressed, mainly in length, until they reached the same length as a regular passenger rail coach. The cars would have used an overhead catenary for power pickup instead of a direct current third rail. Additionally, conventional traction motors were to have been used instead of a linear induction motor. The decision to launch the program was made after a study was published examining several options, including the use of electric multiple units, standard diesel trains, electric trains, and ALRT.

- Design 1: 124 passengers - 36.0 m articulated car set
- Design 2: 147 passengers - 45.6 m articulated car set

== Stations ==
List of the planned stations on the ALRT routes (stations listed west to east):

- Western section: Hamilton, Aldershot, Burlington, Appleby, Bronte, Fourth Line, Oakville
- Eastern section: Pickering, Ajax, Whitby, Hopkins, Stevenson, Harmony

== Cancellation ==
The GO-ALRT program was shut down by the Miller government in 1985 but other factors were considered:

- Unproven technology and concerns over problems with the same ICTS on the Scarborough RT
- Access to right-of-way on the southern route

Since the cancellation, there have been no similar plans for GO in Toronto. GO Transit operates a bus service along Highway 401 that parallels the northern ALRT route. Modern GO Transit Lakeshore services continue to serve the western and eastern routes.

ICTS technology was later acquired by Bombardier Transportation when it bought UTDC in 1992 and is now utilized in the Bombardier Advanced Rapid Transit platform. The transit vehicle technology is now referred to as the Bombardier Innovia Metro 300, as part of a transit vehicle technology lineup of the Bombardier Innovia product line.

== Reflection ==
Some observers considered the GO-ALRT proposal redundant, noting that interurban railways, referred to in Canada as radial cars, already operated in the Toronto region earlier in the 20th century. Urban planning in the Toronto area later emphasized suburban infill development, with some proposals including light rail transit similar to European low-floor tramways. Proposals for long-distance high-speed rail rapid transit have been compared to systems such as the Bay Area Rapid Transit and the Hong Kong MTR, although there has been limited recent discussion of connecting Toronto suburbs with a rapid transit network.

The recent GO Transit Regional Express Rail project has been described by transit planners as building on concepts introduced by GO-ALRT. The project involves electrifying existing GO train lines and increasing service frequency to every 3–8 minutes during peak periods and every 6–15 minutes off-peak on five corridors. According to Metrolinx, the completed project will operate at frequencies similar to regional rail networks in Europe, such as the Réseau Express Régional in Paris.
