= GO Transit fleet =

Public transport vehicles used in Ontario, Canada

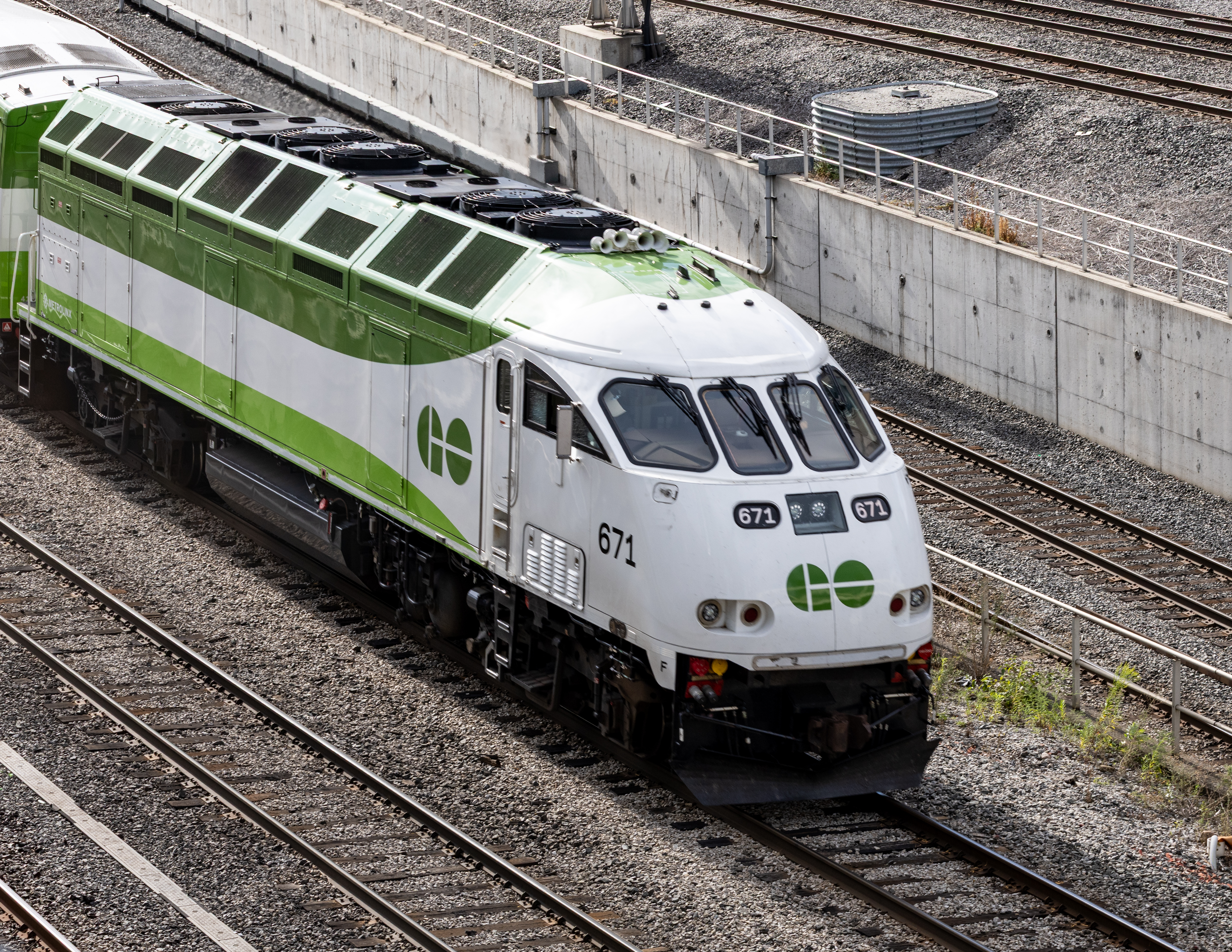
MP54AC number 671 near the Union Station Rail Corridor

GO Transit, the interregional public transit system in Southern Ontario, has 91 locomotives, 979 train coaches, and 752 buses.

== Rail ==
=== Locomotives ===
Active

The vast majority of GO Transit's active locomotive fleet consists of MP40PH-3C diesel-electric locomotives manufactured by MotivePower in Boise, Idaho. These replaced most of the older EMD F59PH over a 4-year transition program from 2008 to 2011. The new MP40 locomotives are significantly more powerful with 4000 bhp vs the F59's 3000 bhp, and their greater Head End Power capacity allows them to handle 12-coach trains instead of 10.

In 2011, GO Transit ordered 11 MPI MP54AC locomotives, to be rebuilt from existing units, followed by an order for 10 new build locomotives. MP40PH-3C unit 647 was sent back to Boise for conversion with a Cummins QSK-95 diesel engine into an MP54 in 2012, and was completed in 2015 (although dual Cummins QSK-60 engines were substituted instead). Testing of the first MP54AC began in December 2015, and the locomotive was formally delivered in March 2016, by which time GO Transit had increased its order for newbuild units to 16, for a total of 26. The order of 10 rebuilt units was later converted to newbuilds, the first of which was delivered in March 2018. While they are technically model MP54ACs, GO classifies them as MP40PHT-T4AC units.

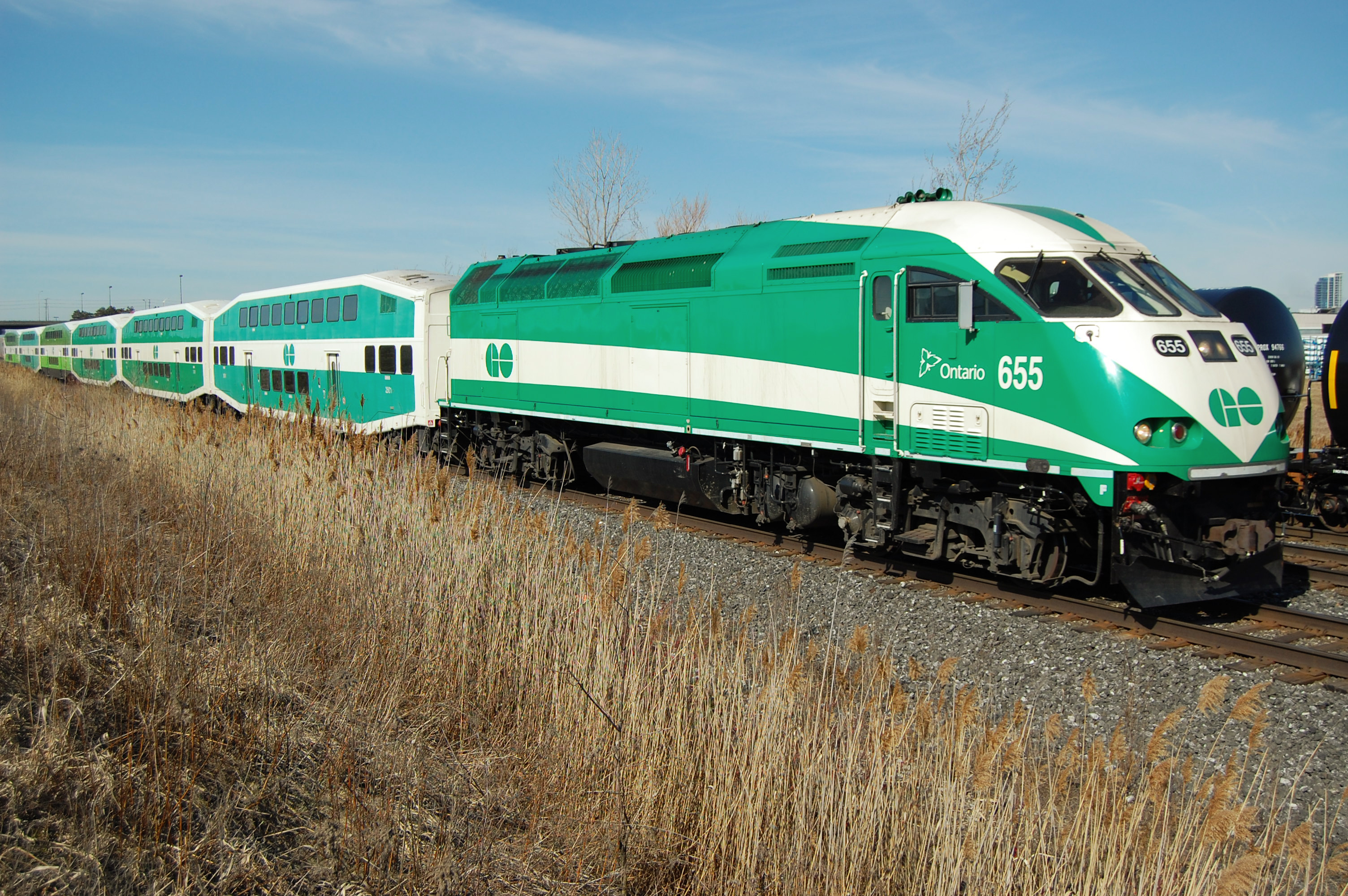
MP40PH-3C Locomotive in Brampton ON

Year	Manufacturer	Model	Numbers	Notes
1990	EMD	F59PH III	557-561	Rebuilt 2011 into F59PHR
1994	EMD	F59PH IV	562-564	Rebuilt 2011 into F59PHR
2008–2009	MPI	MP40PH-3C	600-626	
2010	MPI	MP40PH-3C	627-646	
2010-11	MPI	MP40PH-3C	648-656	
2013-14	MPI	MP40PH-3C	657-666	EPA Tier 3 compliant
2015	MPI	MP54AC (MP40PHTC-T4)	647	Prototype MP54AC
2017-2018	MPI	MP54AC (MP40PHT-T4AC)	667-682	AC Traction

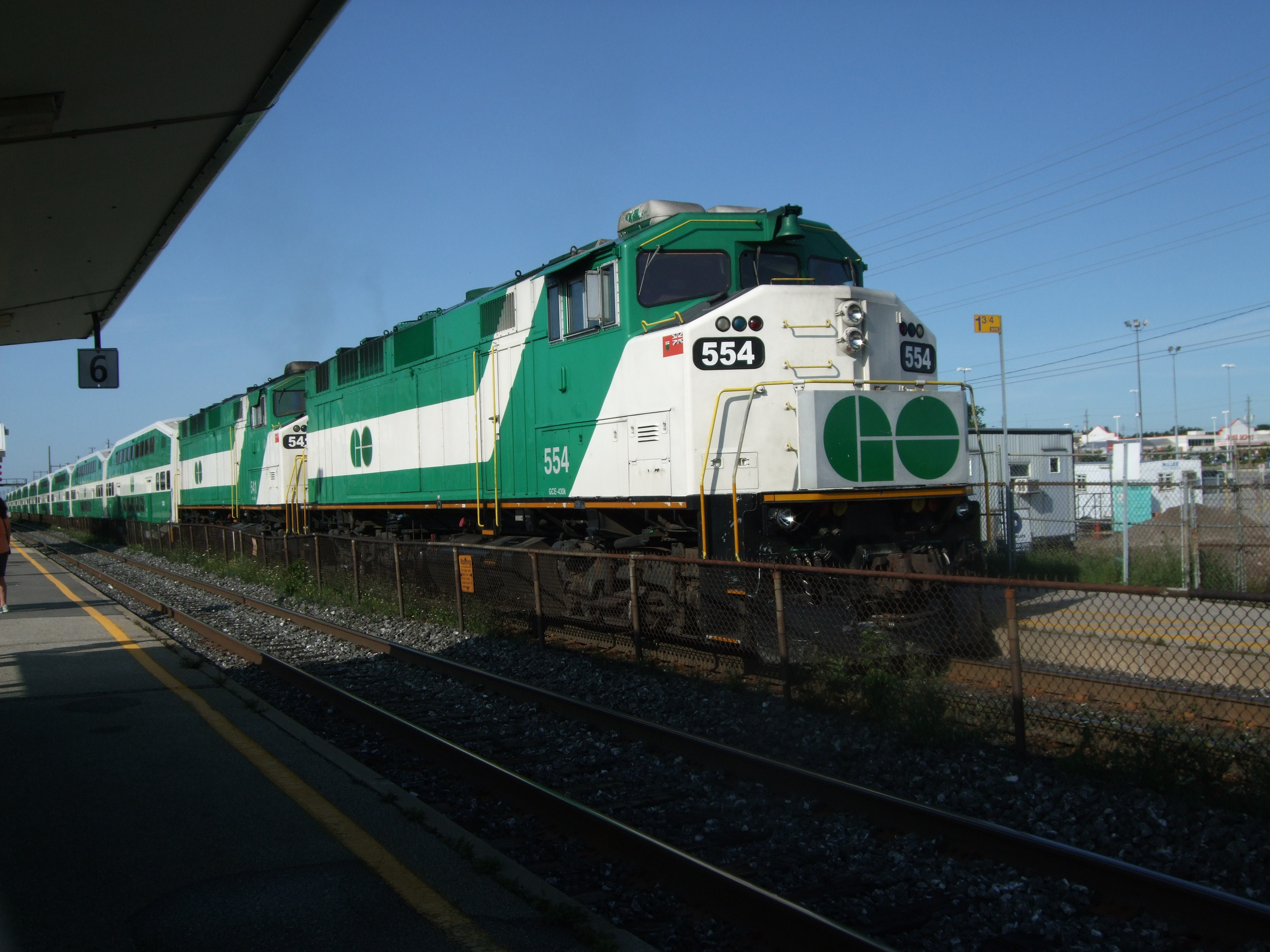
Two F59PH locomotives at Oakville station

Retired

Year	Manufacturer	Model	Numbers	Notes
1967	Hawker Siddeley Canada	Hawker Siddeley RTC-85SP/D (Single-level self-propelled unit)	Built as D700-D701, D702-D708; Renumbered to 9825-9826, 9827-9833	Self-powered Diesel multiple units. Cars part of original 1967 commuter car order built by HSC in Thunder Bay, Ontario, and based on the Hawker-Siddeley H-Series subway car. Almost identical to non-powered cab cars, but powered by Rolls-Royce engines. D700-701 equipped with controls at both ends. All later converted into non-powered cab cars by 1975 and renumbered 108-116. Sold off to ONR and AMT.
Late-1970s	EMD	APU (former F7B APU)	800-802	Non-powered. 900-series are "APCU" control cab and Head End Power units built from FP7s from ONR and MILW. 800-series units are "APU" Head End Power cars built from BN F7Bs. All retired after the 1980s, some resold, most scrapped.
1973, 1976; 1981	EMD	APCU (former FP7A)	900-911 (some originally 9858-9862)	Non-powered. 900-series are "APCU" control cab and Head End Power units built from FP7s from ONR and MILW. 800-series units are "APU" Head End Power cars built from BN F7Bs. All retired after the 1980s, some resold, most scrapped.
1973, 1976; 1981	General Motors Diesel	APCU (former FP7A)	900-911 (some originally 9858-9862)	Non-powered. 900-series are "APCU" control cab and Head End Power units built from FP7s from ONR and MILW. 800-series units are "APU" Head End Power cars built from BN F7Bs. All retired after the 1980s, some resold, most scrapped.
1966	General Motors Diesel	GP40TC locomotive	500-507	All sold to Amtrak in 1988. Rebuilt by Norfolk Southern and now classed as GP38H-3s.
1973, 1975	General Motors Diesel	GP40-2L locomotive	700-710	11 purchase; Retired 1991, 703 sold to Tri-Rail, all others sold to Canadian National (9668-9677)
1978	General Motors Diesel	F40PH locomotive	510-515	Sold to Amtrak in 1990 and renumbered to 410-415. All retired by early 2000s.
1967	EMD	GP40 locomotive	720-726	bought from Chrome Crankshaft in 1982. Rebuilt to GP40-2M by Chrome Crankshaft/CRI&P; traded to GMDD for F59PHs 561-568 in 1994
1988	EMD	F59PH I	520-535	525, 527-528 sold to TRE. 526, 530, 532 now owned by Metra. 521, 529, 534-535 now owned by NCDOT (Rail Division for NC By Train Piedmont service). 533 now owned by West Coast Express. All others are owned by RB Leasing, some since resold to other agencies.
1989–1990	EMD	F59PH II	536-539	Sold to RB Leasing, 2010. 536 resold to NCDOT. 537-538 scrapped in 2013.
1990	EMD	F59PH II	540-547	543-545 sold to Exo. All others (540 to 542) sold to RB Leasing, later resold to NCDOT.
1990	EMD	F59PH III	548-556	551 and 554 sold to RB Leasing, 551 resold to NCDOT, 554 scrapped in 2013. All others (548 to 550, 552 to 553, 555 to 556) sold to Exo.
1994	EMD	F59PH IV	565-568	Sold to Trinity Railway Express in Irving, Texas, USA, 1997.

=== Coaches ===
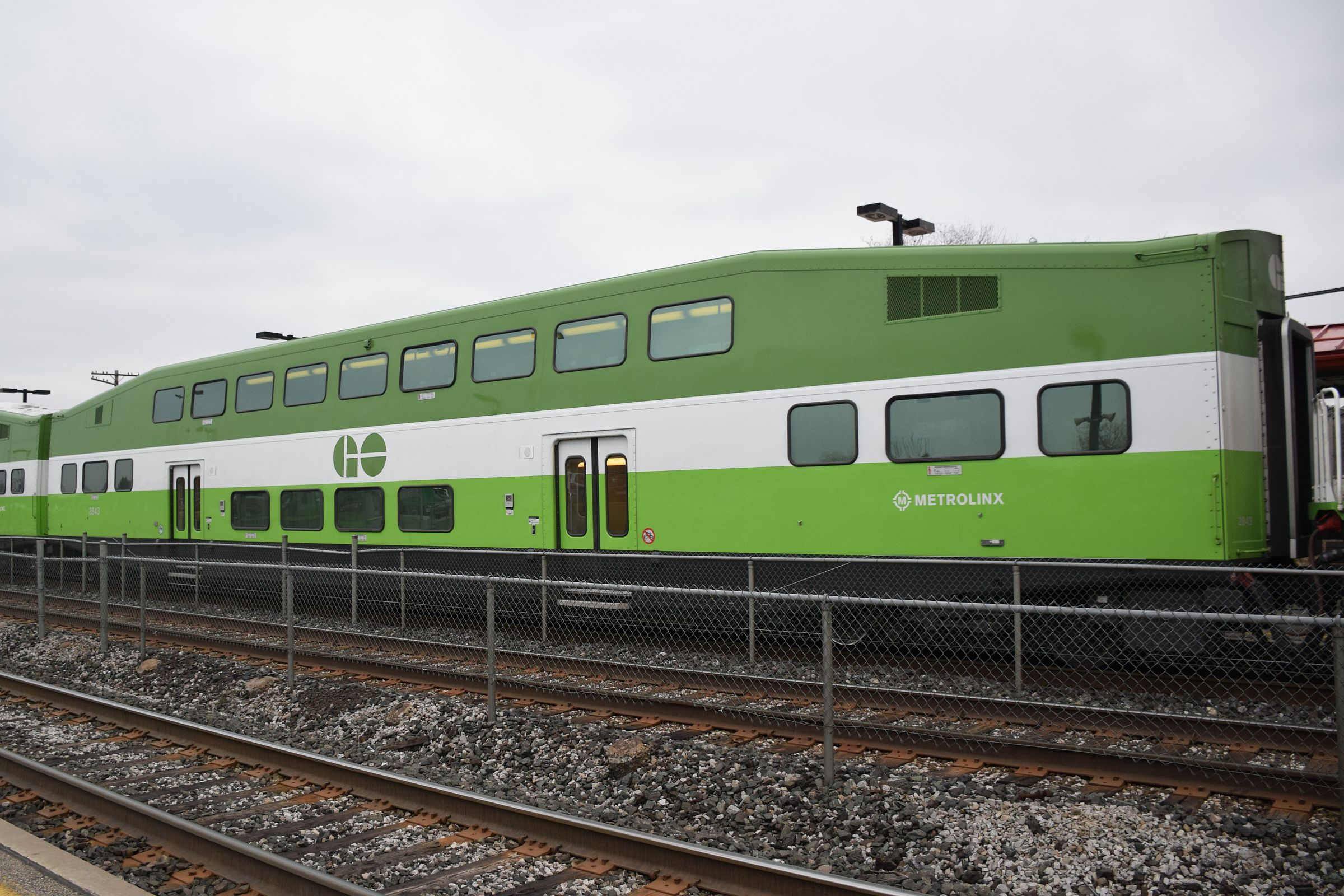
All GO Trains use bilevel rail cars entirely

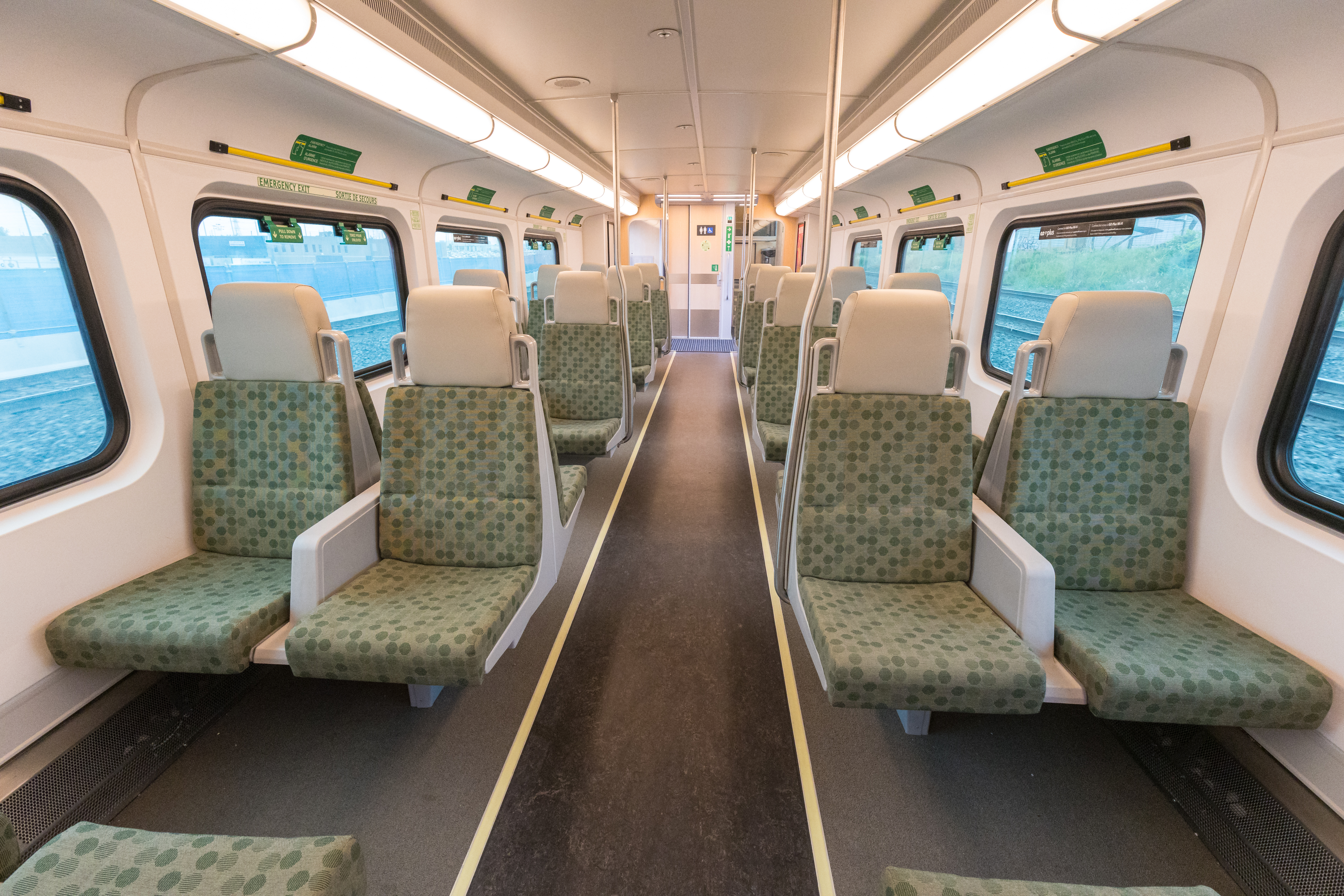
Lower level of the coach

GO's railcar fleet is composed exclusively of Bombardier BiLevel Coaches manufactured by Bombardier Transportation or its predecessors in Thunder Bay, Ontario. Since January 2021, newer BiLevel coaches are manufactured by Alstom. In November 2021, the fleet comprised a total of 949 railcars, including cab car variants.

On June 1, 2012, Metrolinx contracted Bombardier to manufacture an additional 60 bilevel cab cars of an updated design incorporating crash energy management features and a streamlined cab. Deliveries of these models have been ongoing since 2015.

Manufacturer	Model	Built	Numbers	Disabled access	Notes
Hawker Siddeley Canada	Hawker Siddeley RTC-85 (single-level coach and cab car configurations)	1967-1976	1000-1105, 100-107 (Renumbered from many different series).	No	Original 1967 commuter car order built by Hawker Siddeley Thunder Bay, Ontario and based on the Hawker-Siddeley H-Series subway car. Purchased in cab car and coach configurations for push-pull service. Subsequent orders placed between 1967 and 1976 for more equipment. Some cars leased to MARC. Cars sold to ONR (16) and AMT (92) in the 1980s. 2 cars went to Pandrol-Jackson (Electric Tamper and Equipment Company) as crew-cars for railgrinding operations; 7 cars scrapped. Cab car 104 was restored by GO Transit in 2017, and is displayed at the Toronto Railway Museum in downtown Toronto.
St Louis Car Company	Gallery coach/cab car 7600 series	1955	13 (test) run and several other 7600 series cars	No	Leased from C&NW; several 7600 series cars used with GO locomotive GP40 locomotives on runs beginning January 19, 1976 along Lakeshore Line. C&NW coach #13 paired with GO Transit GP40-2L #9811 for test runs in April 1976
Canadian Vickers	Gallery Bi-level Town Car based on Pullman Company bi level cars	1969	9XX-9XX	No	4 cars leased from Canadian Pacific Montreal-area commuter service (STCUM-AMT 900-series) for test runs in July 1974.
HSC	Bi-Level I coach	1976–1978	2000–2079	No	2000-2001, 2013-2014, 2016–2017, 2020, 2022, 2023-2024 sold to TRE, 1997, renumbered 1050-1059.
HSC	Bi-Level II coach	1983–1984	2100–2155, 200-214	No	All cab cars were initially decommissioned and converted into coaches in 2016-17, however they were rebuilt and converted once again into cab cars in 2022-23 and are currently beginning to return to service again.
UTDC	Bi-Level III coach	1987-1989	2200-2253, 215-223	No	223 sold to TRE in 1999, renumbered 1000. All other cab cars decommissioned and converted into coaches in 2016-17. Several extra cars leased from Tri-Rail, 2002.
UTDC	Bi-Level IV coach	1989–1990	2300-2341, 224-241	No (see note)	224 sold to TRE in 1999, renumbered 1001. All other cab cars decommissioned and converted to coaches in 2016-17. The 2300 series cars were converted in to accessible cars in 1995, and later converted back to non-accessible when the Series VII accessible cars came in to service.
UTDC	Bi-Level V coach	1990–1991	2400-2455, 2499	No	2499 was a next-generation prototype, which all future GO Transit coaches would be based upon.
Bombardier Transportation	Bi-Level VI coach	2002	2500–2521	Yes	
Bombardier Transportation	Bi-Level VII coach	2003-2008	2522-2544, 2600–2661, 242-250	Yes (2522-2544 and 242-250 only)	5 orders. All cab cars decommissioned and converted into coaches in 2016-17. However all cab cars were refurbished in 2025-2026 and remain in active service as of now.
Bombardier Transportation	Bi-Level VIII coach	2008–2015	2545-2560, 2700-2857, 251-257	Yes (2545-2560 only)	4 orders. 2545-2546, 2700-2729, 251-253 delivered 2008. 2547-2549, 2730-2754, 254, delivered 2009-2010. 2550-2554, 2755-2814, 255-257 delivered 2011-2013. 2555-2560, 2815-2857 delivered 2014-2015.
Bombardier Transportation	Bi-Level IX coach	2015–Present	4000-4225, 4500-4533, 300-380	Yes (4500-4528 only)	5 orders. 300-361 delivered 2015-2016. 362-366, 4000-4054, 4500-4504 delivered 2016-2017. 4055-4107, 4505-4519 being delivered throughout 2018. Cars 300-380 are cab cars with new Crash Energy Management (CEM) features. Final order of 36 coaches (4195-4225, 4529-4533) placed September 10, 2019.

=== Work cars ===
Plasser American DynaCAT 09-2X and Unimat work cars are used for Metrolinx GO projects as well as the construction of the Ontario Line. These cars are stored at the Whitby Maintenance Facilities.

== Bus ==
GO Transit currently operates two types of buses: single-decker highway coaches, constituting 75% of the active fleet; and commuter-type double-decker buses, constituting the remaining 25%. All vehicles run on diesel fuel.

- The current highway coach fleet consists exclusively of D4500-model coaches built by Motor Coach Industries (numbered from 2100 onwards). The first of these coaches were ordered in 2001 and orders have continued until 2015. They have a length of 45 feet (14 m). All orders since 2005 (from 2267 onwards) are of a facelifted design, designated as D4500CT, and two of these vehicles (3000 and 3001), ordered in 2008, have a hybrid-electric drivetrain and are model D4500CTH. Older vehicles in the fleet are retired after reaching a certain mileage; as of 2017, the oldest vehicles in the active fleet were made in 2004.
- The double-decker fleet uses Alexander Dennis Enviro500s. They come in three distinct configurations, differing mainly in height and distinguishable external appearance:
  - The standard-height version (numbered in the 8000s) are 43 feet (13 m) in length and have a height of 4.2 metres (13 ft 9 in). Built in Falkirk, Scotland, they entered service in 2008, but their height prevents them from meeting many height standards set by the provincial Ministry of Transportation, restricting their usage to the Highway 407 and Highway 403 corridors, providing service between Peel and York Regions.
  - The Go-Anywhere version (numbered in the 8100s and 8200s) are the same length, but have a shorter height of 4.1 metres (13 ft 5 in). This variant, also made in Falkirk, entered service in 2012, and their lower height allows these buses to meet many more clearance standards as a result and are used on a wider variety of routes, including those that travel on Highway 401 into Durham Region.
  - The Super-Lo version (numbered in the 8300s) are longer than previous orders, at 45 feet (14 m) in length, but have an even shorter height of 3.9 metres (12 ft 10 in). Developed specifically for the GO Transit network, it is capable of accessing bus terminals with height restrictions that prevent previous double-deckers accessing them. They are also the first double-decker buses to be manufactured locally (from a newly established facility in Vaughan). The first of these vehicles entered service in 2016 and orders are ongoing to replace older single-decker coaches. By 2020, Metrolinx estimates that 75% of the active fleet would be composed of double-deckers.

In May 2023, GO Transit placed two electric buses into revenue service on a trial basis. They had been tested without passengers since December 2021. An electric bus costs $1.5 million compared with $700,000 for a diesel bus; the electric bus has lower fuel and maintenance costs. Between charges, an electric bus can run about 225 kilometres (140 mi) in winter and 300 kilometres (190 mi) in summer; GO bus routes can be as long as 650 kilometres (400 mi). Battery charging takes 3–4 hours at garages.

=== Active ===
Numbers	Year	Make	Model	Length	Engine	Notes
2450-2482	2011	MCI	D4500CT	45 ft 5 in (13.84 m)	Detroit Diesel Series 60	
2483-2499	2011	MCI	D4500CT	45 ft 5 in (13.84 m)	Cummins ISX12 (EPA 2010)	
2500-2517	2012	MCI	D4500CT	45 ft 5 in (13.84 m)	Cummins ISX12 (EPA 2010)	
2518-2535	2012	MCI	D4500CT	45 ft 5 in (13.84 m)	Cummins ISX12 (EPA 2010)	
2536-2553	2013	MCI	D4500CT	45 ft 5 in (13.84 m)	Cummins ISX12 (EPA 2010)	
2554-2606	2014	MCI	D4500CT	45 ft 5 in (13.84 m)	Cummins ISX12 (EPA 2010)	
2607-2616	2015	MCI	D4500CT	45 ft 5 in (13.84 m)	Cummins ISX12 (EPA 2010)	
8300–8337	2016	AD	Enviro500 "SuperLo"	42 ft 0 in (12.80 m)	Cummins ISL9 (EPA 2016)	
8338–8378	2017	AD	Enviro500 "SuperLo"	42 ft 0 in (12.80 m)	Cummins ISL9 (EPA 2016) / Cummins L9 (EPA 2016)	
8379–8429	2017–18	AD	Enviro500 "SuperLo"	42 ft 0 in (12.80 m)	Cummins L9 (EPA 2016)	
8430–8499	2019	AD	Enviro500 "SuperLo"	42 ft 0 in (12.80 m)	Cummins L9 (EPA 2016)	
8500–8521	2019	AD	Enviro500 "SuperLo"	42 ft 0 in (12.80 m)	Cummins L9 (EPA 2016)	
8522–8567	2020–21	AD	Enviro500 "SuperLo"	42 ft 0 in (12.80 m)	Cummins L9 (EPA 2016)	
5000–5079	2025	MCI	D45 CRT	45 ft 6 in (13.86m)	Cummins X12 (EPA 2024)	
5080-5177	2026	MCI	D45 CRT	45 ft 6 in (13.86m)	Cummins X12 (EPA 2024)	

AD = Alexander Dennis; all buses are wheelchair accessible

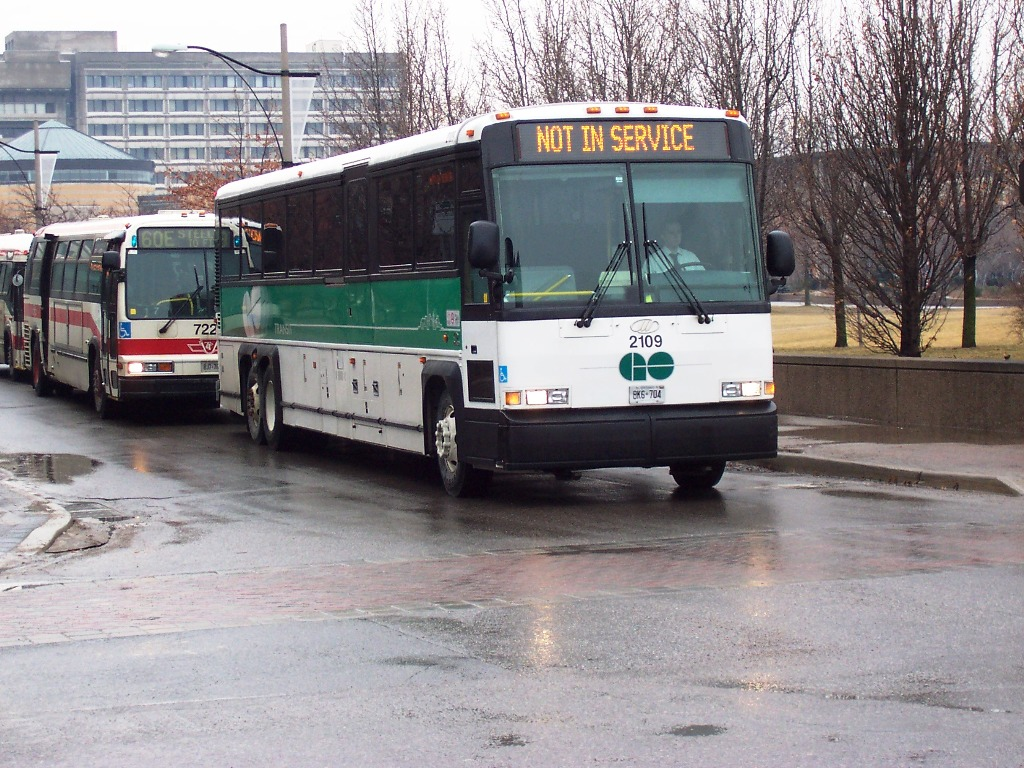
GO Transit MCI D4500 with original paint scheme

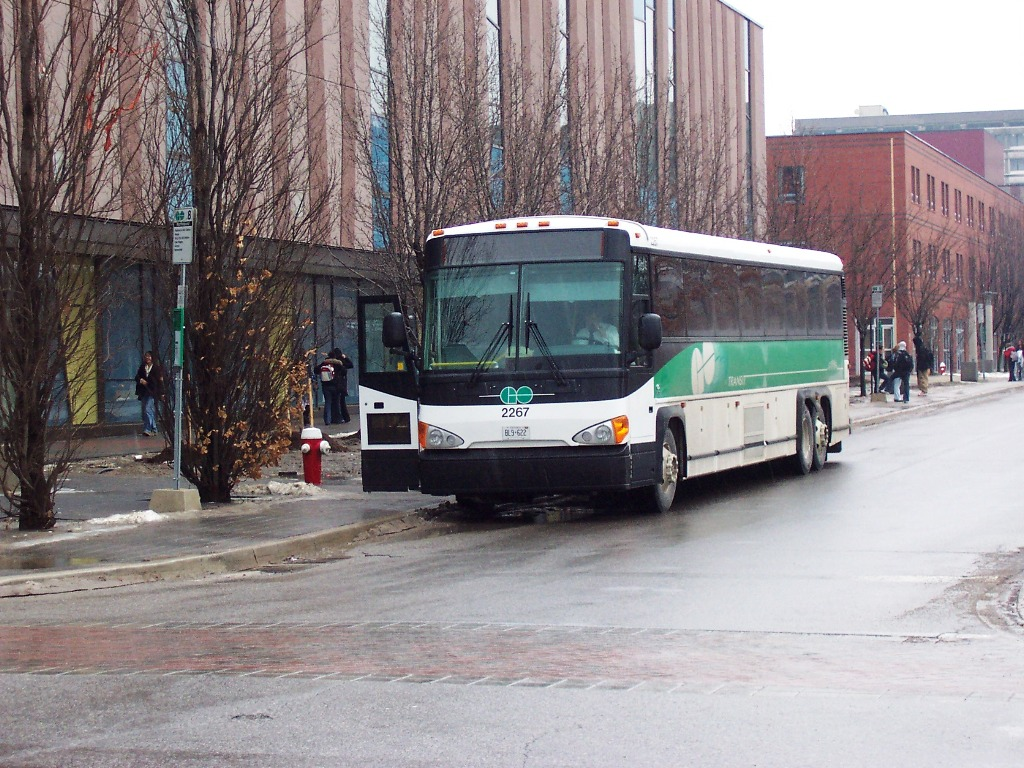
GO Transit MCI D4500CT with original paint scheme

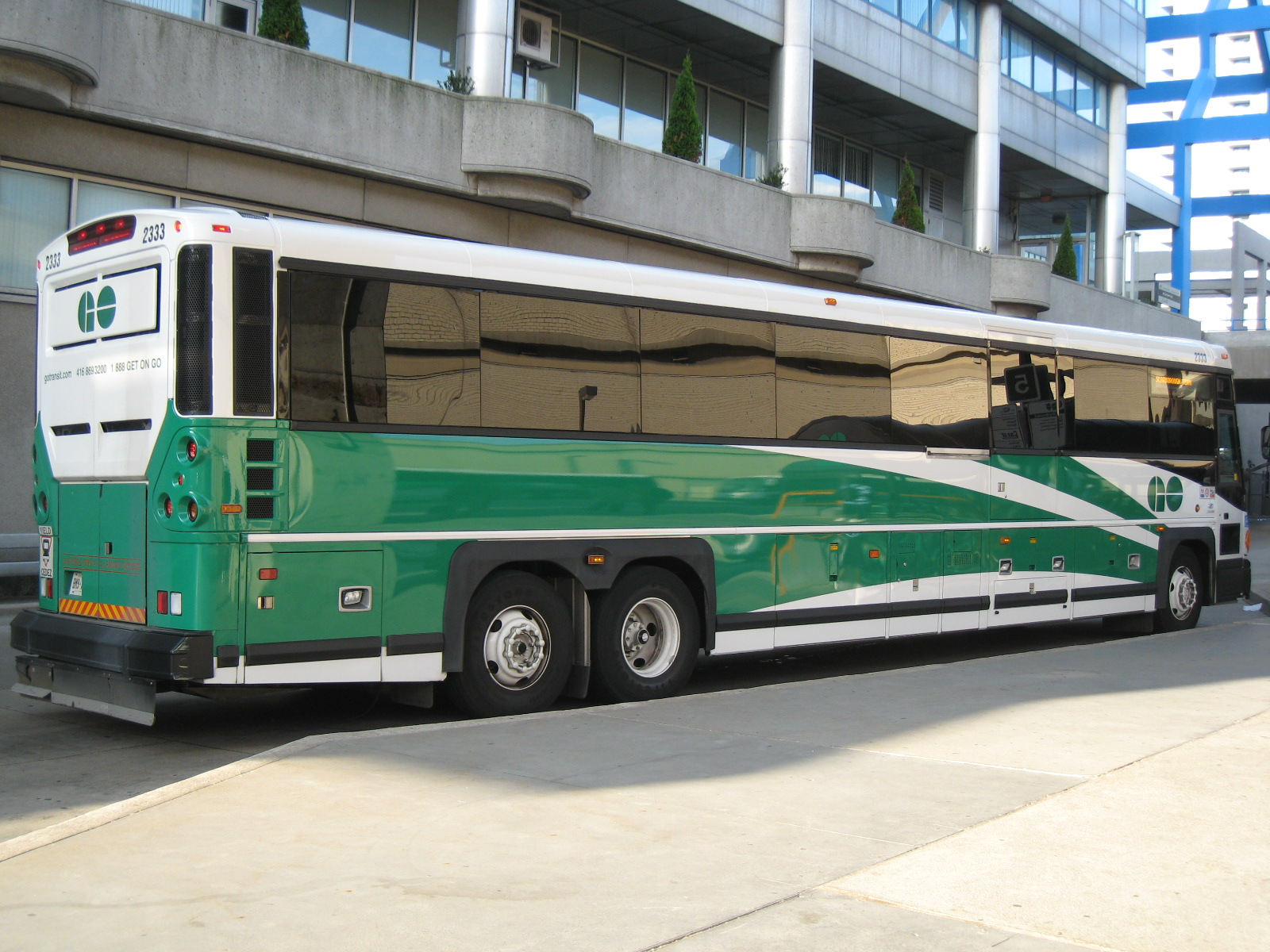
Back view of the 2007 GO bus paint scheme back view

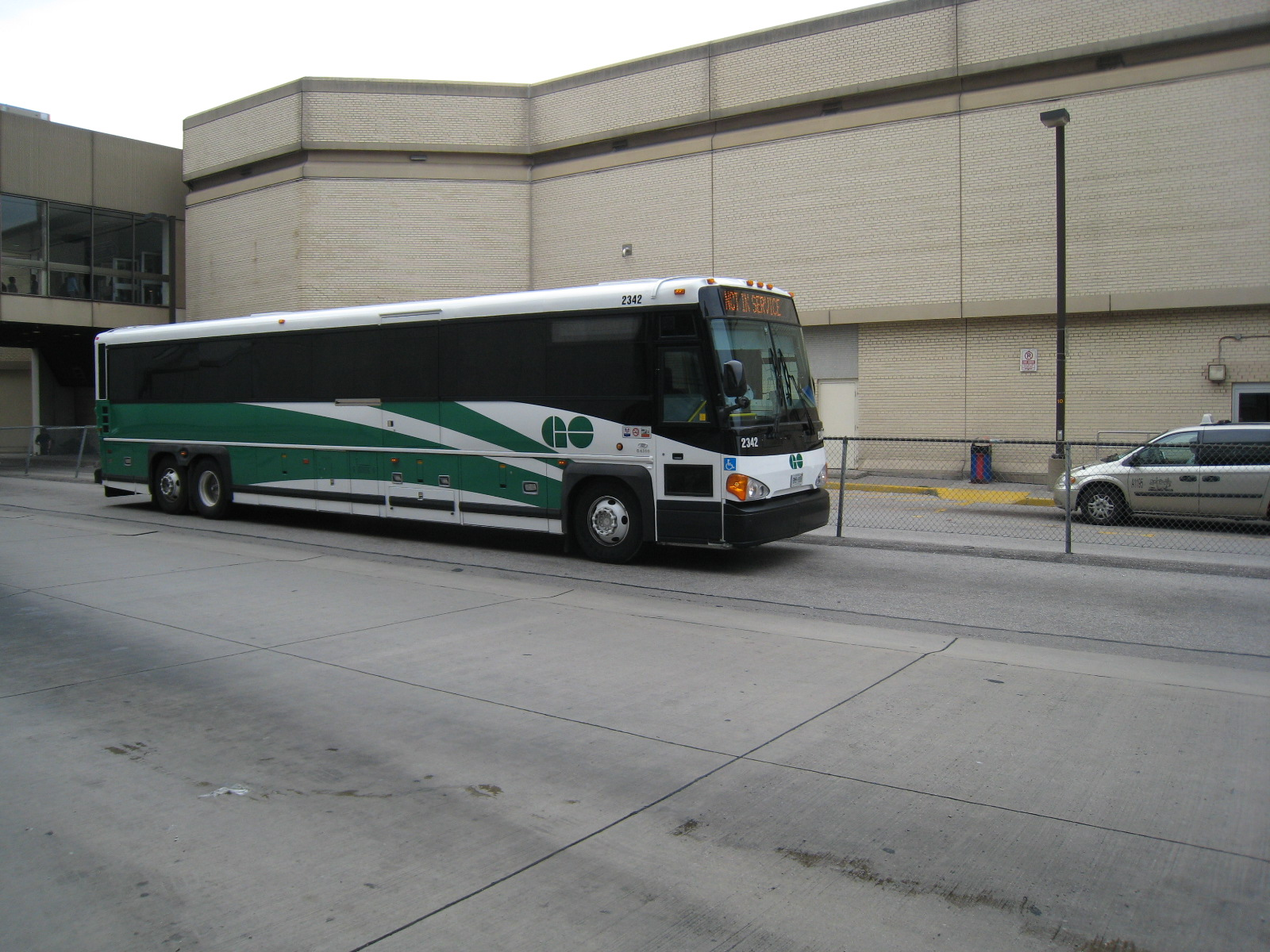
Front view of the 2007 GO bus paint scheme

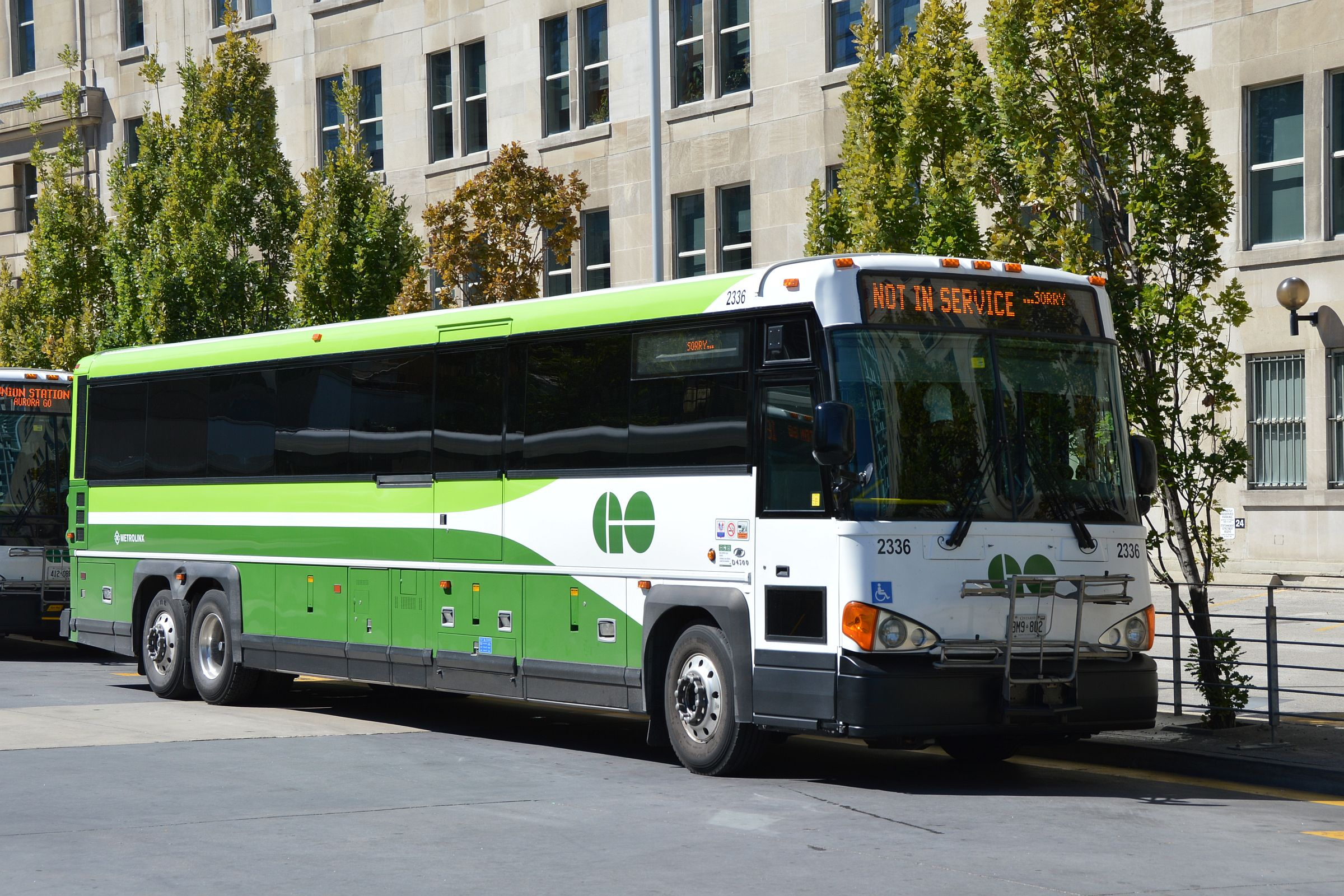
A D4500CT with the 2013 GO two-toned livery

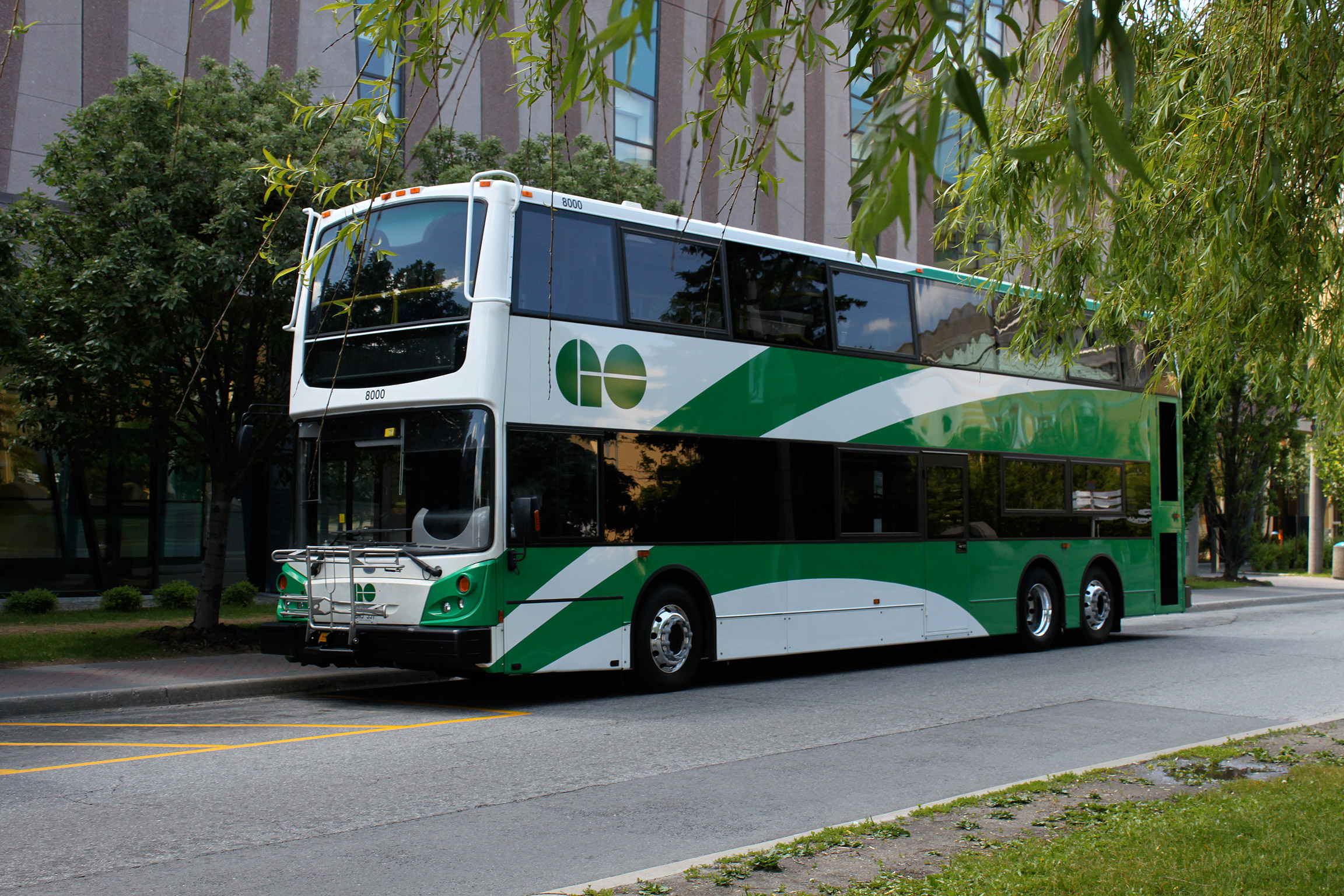
Standard-height Alexander Dennis Enviro500

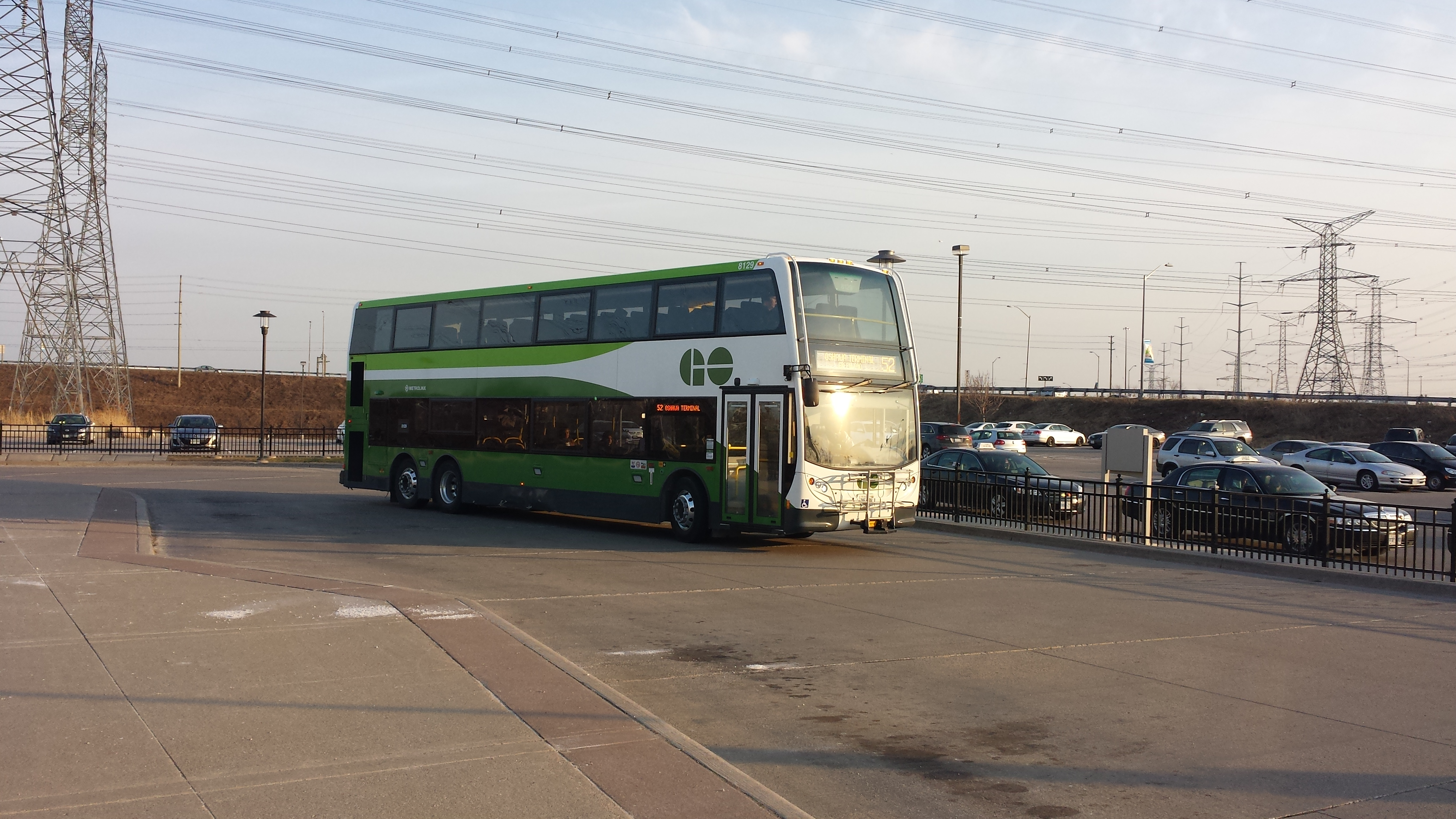
Go-Anywhere height Alexander Dennis Enviro500

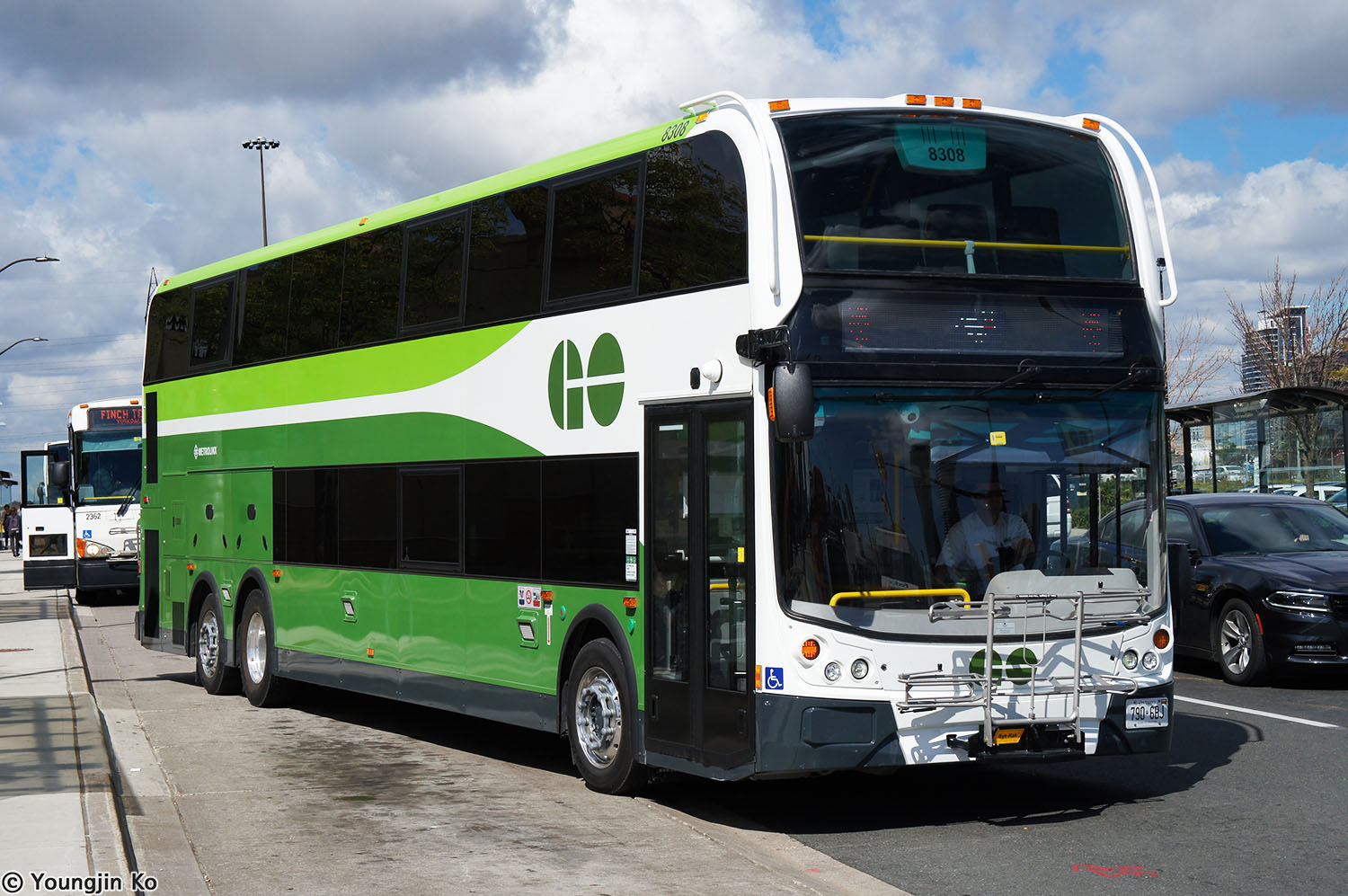
Super-Lo height Alexander Dennis Enviro500

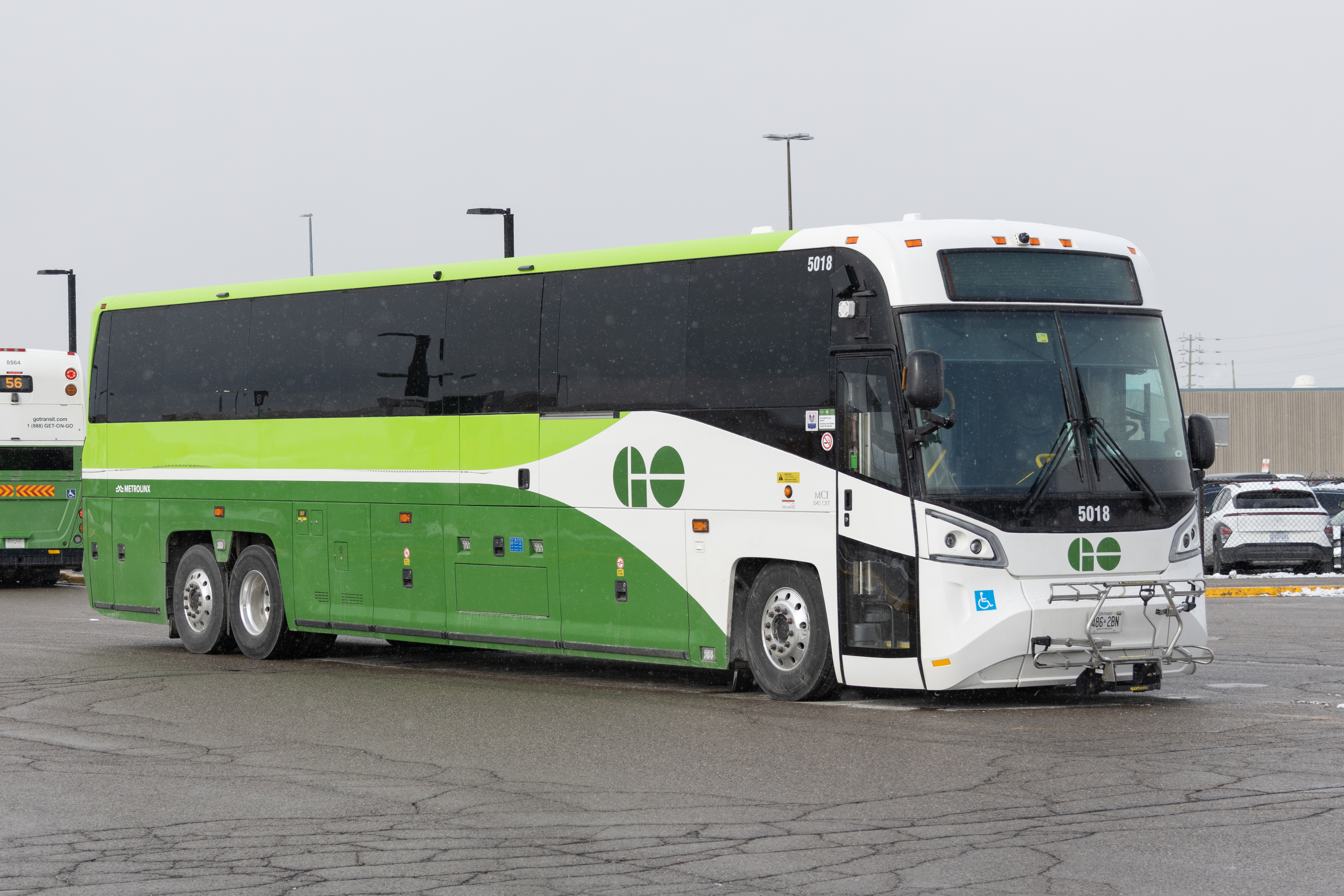
MCI D45 CRT

=== Retired ===
Previously, GO Transit also operated suburban-style transit buses from General Motors, Orion Bus Industries, and New Flyer Industries, and motor coaches by Prevost Car. GM buses (except for Suburbans) were manufactured in London, Ontario and Orion buses in Mississauga, Ontario. All of these older vehicles are now retired.

Numbers	Year	Make	Model	Length	Engine	Notes
1000–1019	1970	GMDD	T8H-5305A	40 ft 0 in (12.2 m)	Detroit Diesel 8V71	
1020–1029	1973	GMDD	T8H-5307A	40 ft 0 in (12.2 m)	Detroit Diesel 8V71	
1030–1039	1974	GMDD	T8H-5307A	40 ft 0 in (12.2 m)	Detroit Diesel 8V71	
1045–1056	1975	GMDD	T8H-5307A	40 ft 0 in (12.2 m)	Detroit Diesel 8V71	
1060–1099	1976	GMC	S8H-5304A	40 ft 0 in (12.2 m)	Detroit Diesel 8V71	
1100–1119	1977	GMDD	T8H-5307A	40 ft 0 in (12.2 m)	Detroit Diesel 8V71	
1120–1123	1974	GMDD	T8H-5307A	40 ft 0 in (12.2 m)	Detroit Diesel 8V71	
1125–1129	1985	OBI	01.508	40 ft 0 in (12.2 m)	Detroit Diesel 6V92TA	
1130–1141	1987	OBI	01.508	40 ft 0 in (12.2 m)	Detroit Diesel 6V92TA	
1150–1163	2000	OBI	05.501	40 ft 0 in (12.2 m)	Detroit Diesel S50	Disabled access
1164–1173	2002	OBI	05.501	40 ft 0 in (12.2 m)	Detroit Diesel S50	Disabled access
1250–1262	1975	MCI	MC-8	40 ft 0 in (12.2 m)	Detroit Diesel 8V71	
1270–1281	1978	MCI	MC-8	40 ft 0 in (12.2 m)	Detroit Diesel 8V71	
1290–1294	1980	MCI	MC-9	40 ft 0 in (12.2 m)	Detroit Diesel 8V71	
1300–1324	1981	MCI	MC-9	40 ft 0 in (12.2 m)	Detroit Diesel 8V71	
1400–1416	1986	MCI	102-A2	40 ft 0 in (12.2 m)	Detroit Diesel 6V92TA	
1417–1425	1987	MCI	102-A2	40 ft 0 in (12.2 m)	Detroit Diesel 6V92TA	
1426–1435	1988	MCI	102-A2	40 ft 0 in (12.2 m)	Detroit Diesel 6V92TA	
1436–1445	1989	MCI	102-A2	40 ft 0 in (12.2 m)	Detroit Diesel 6V92TA	
1446–1458	1990	MCI	102-A2	40 ft 0 in (12.2 m)	Detroit Diesel 6V92TA	
1459–1468	1991	MCI	102-A2	40 ft 0 in (12.2 m)	Detroit Diesel 6V92TA	
1500–1514	1990	MCI	102-A3	40 ft 0 in (12.2 m)	Detroit Diesel 6V92TA	
1520–1531	1993	MCI	102-C3	40 ft 0 in (12.2 m)	Cummins L10	
1600–1609	1999	Prevost	LeMirage XL	40 ft 0 in (12.2 m)	Detroit Diesel Series 60	Disabled access
1900–1950	1991	New Flyer	D40S	40 ft 0 in (12.2 m)	Detroit Diesel 6V92TA	
2000–2007	2000	Orion	05.501	40 ft 8.5 in (12.41 m)	Detroit Diesel Series 50	Disabled access
2008–2016	2001	Orion	05.501	40 ft 8.5 in (12.41 m)	Detroit Diesel Series 50	even numbers only
2298–2317	2006	MCI	D4500CT	45 ft 5 in (13.84 m)	Caterpillar C13 EPA 2004	
2318–2353	2007	MCI	D4500CT	45 ft 5 in (13.84 m)	Caterpillar C13 EPA 2004	
2354–2419	2008	MCI	D4500CT	45 ft 5 in (13.84 m)	Caterpillar C13 EPA 2007	
2420–2439	2009	MCI	D4500CT	45 ft 5 in (13.84 m)	Cummins ISM EPA 2007	
3000–3003	2009	MCI	D4500CTH	45 ft 5 in (13.84 m)	Cummins ISL 330HP EPA 2007	hybrid
8000–8011	2008	AD	Enviro500	42 ft 0 in (12.8 m)	Cummins ISM EPA 2007	Disabled access
8012–8021	2009	AD	Enviro500	42 ft 0 in (12.8 m)	Cummins ISM EPA 2007	Disabled access
8101–8205	2012	AD	Enviro500	42 ft 0 in (12.80 m)	Cummins ISL (EPA 2010)	
8126–8165	2013	AD	Enviro500	42 ft 0 in (12.80 m)	Cummins ISL (EPA 2013)	8131 stored after fire
8166–8195	2014	AD	Enviro500	42 ft 0 in (12.80 m)	Cummins ISL (EPA 2013)	
8195–8205	2015	AD	Enviro500	42 ft 0 in (12.80 m)	Cummins ISL (EPA 2013)	

== Support vehicles ==
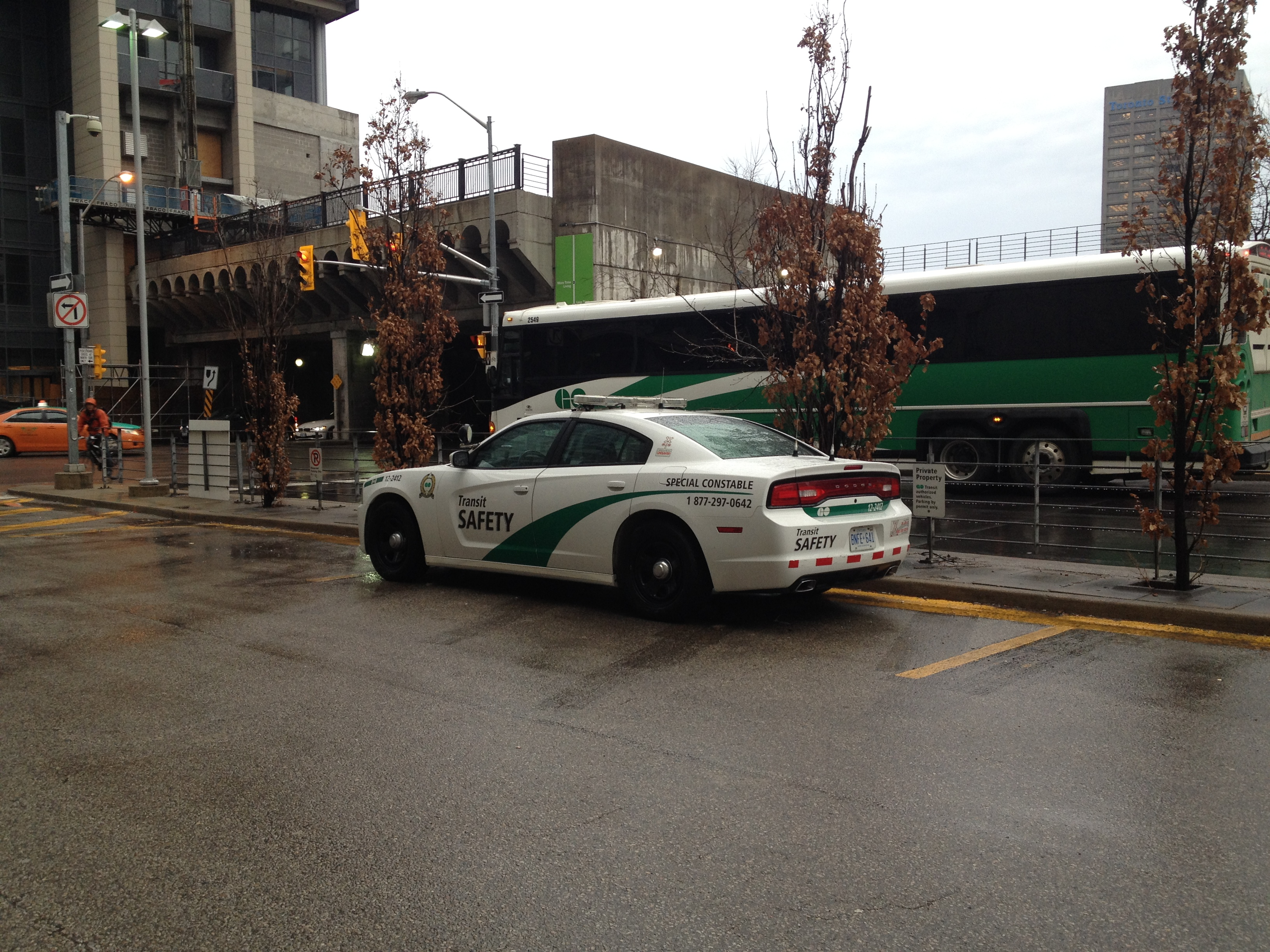
A GO Transit Safety Special Constable Dodge Charger.

Year	Make	Model	Notes
	Ford	Ranger	Support
2008	Ford	E-150	Station Operations
	Ford	F-250	Station Operations
2000–2006	Dodge	Sprinter	Station Operations
2002–2008	Dodge	RAM Super Duty 4X4	Maintenance
2002–2005	Ford	Ranger	Bus Operations
1999–2001	Chevrolet	Trailblazer	Supervisor
2003–present	Chevrolet	Express/Savanna 2500	Rail Operations
2005	Dodge	RAM 205 5RM	Maintenance
2006	Chevrolet	Silverado	Maintenance
2006	GMC (automobile)	Sierra	Maintenance
2008–present	Dodge	Grand Caravan	
