= Union Station Rail Corridor =

Rail corridor in Toronto, Ontario

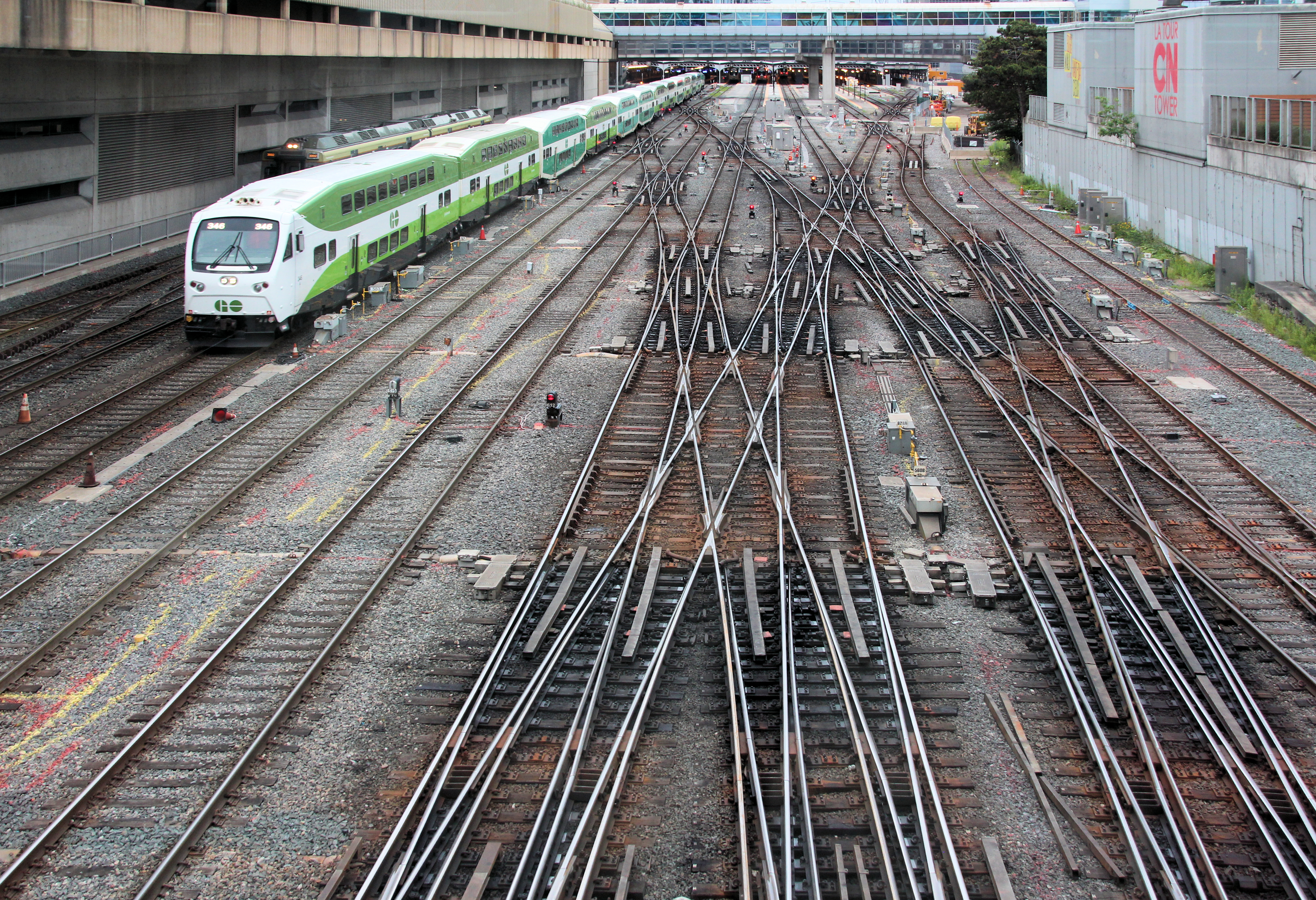
Looking east along the USRC towards Union Station's train shed

The Union Station Rail Corridor (USRC) is a corridor of railway tracks that exist through and adjacent to Union Station in downtown Toronto, Ontario, Canada. It is 6.4 kilometres (4.0 miles) long, approximately stretching from Bathurst Street (mile 1.1) in the west to the Don River in the east, making it the largest rail passenger facility in the country.

== Operations ==
Union Station is the busiest passenger transportation hub in Canada, serving 250,000 people daily. It is a central hub for the Via Rail Corridor intercity service, the central hub for GO Transit commuter rail service for the Greater Toronto and Hamilton Area, and the terminus of the Union Pearson Express which connects to Canada's second-busiest transportation hub, Toronto Pearson Airport. It also provides connections to the Toronto subway, municipal and intercity bus services, and other active transportation modes. More than half of all Canadian intercity passengers and 91% of Toronto commuter train passengers travel through Union Station. To serve all this rail traffic, the USRC has up to 14 tracks across its width and four interlockings that add up to a total of 40 kilometres (25 miles) of laid track. It also has platforms, over 180 signals, 250 switch machines, and various other associated infrastructure.

== Toronto Terminals Railway ==
The Toronto Terminals Railway (TTR), a joint venture of the Canadian National Railway and Canadian Pacific Railway formed in 1906, directs and controls all train movements within the USRC at the John Street, Cherry Street, and Scott Street interlocking towers. The towers are staffed by Rail Traffic Controllers 24 hours a day, 365 days a year. The Rail Traffic Controllers control trains by route assignment, radio communication, track switching, and signals.

== Storage Yards ==
North Bathurst Yard, to the north of the USRC east of Bathurst Street and Don Yard to the east by the Don River are owned and operated by GO Transit for storing trains and maintenance equipment, as well as light servicing of trains.

== History ==
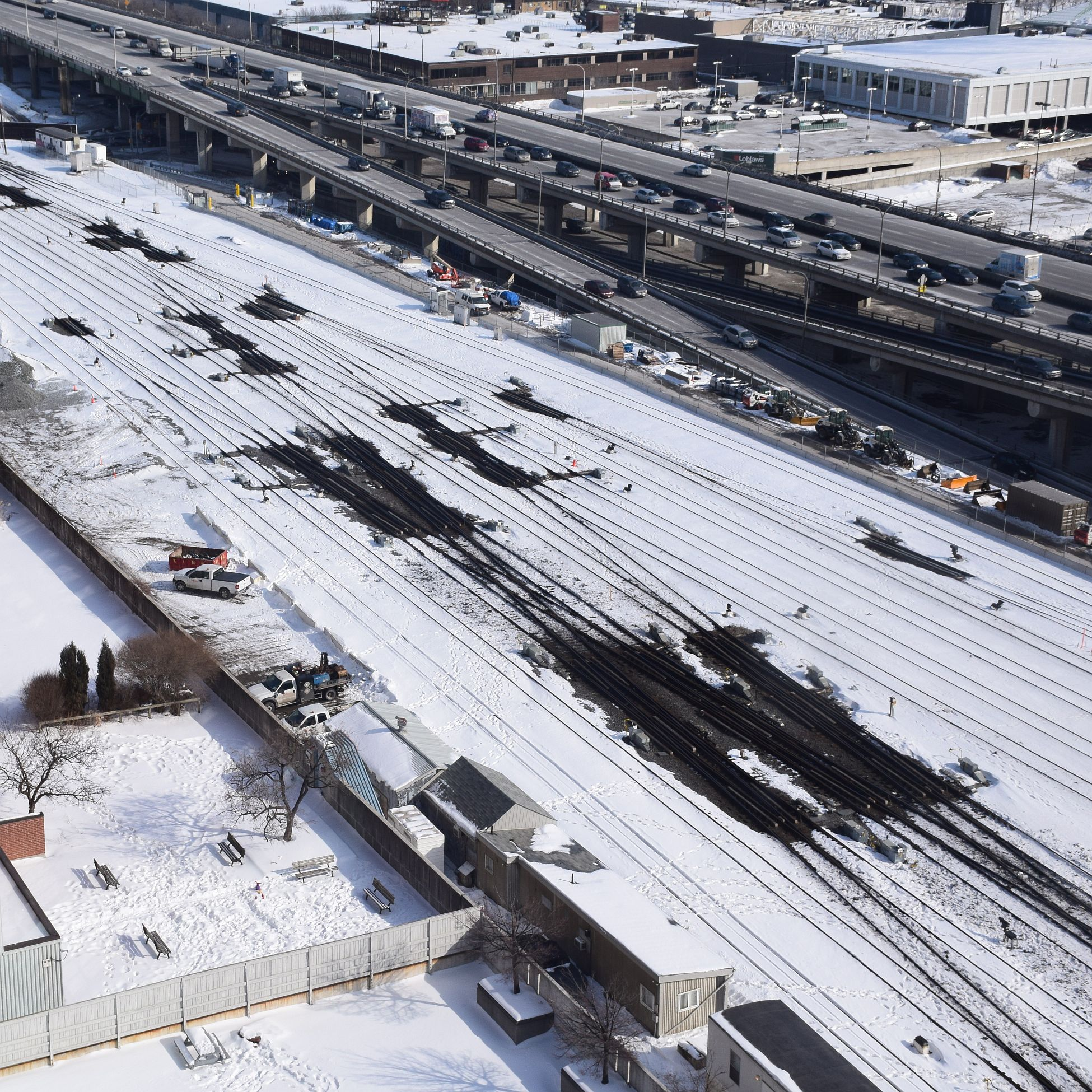
Heated switches keep the tracks clear on the east station approach.

On July 13, 1906, the Toronto Terminals Railway (TTR) was incorporated to "construct, provide, maintain and operate at the City of Toronto a union passenger station". The TTR was jointly owned by the Grand Trunk Railway and the Canadian Pacific Railway who each held 50% of the TTR shares. During station construction, the Grand Trunk Railway went bankrupt, was fully nationalized by the Government of Canada, and merged into the Canadian National Railway which would assume the Grand Trunk's 50% ownership of the TTR (and thus the third Union Station).

Union Station was opened on August 6, 1927 by the Prince of Wales, although it was not completed yet. Four days later, the track network was shifted from the former second Union Station. To get to trains, passengers would walk from the south doors to the tracks located several hundred feet to the south while the new USRC viaduct, concourse and train shed was under construction. Demolition of the second Union Station began almost immediately and was completed in 1928. The third Union Station was not fully completed until 1930 when construction of the train shed had finished.

As GO Transit service increased in the 1970s, the junction between the Lakeshore West line and lines using the then-Georgetown corridor (which included the Milton and then-Bradford lines) was becoming a bottleneck, with some trains experiencing up to 30 minutes of delay. The junction was controlled by hand-thrown switches. A major upgrade to fix the issue was completed on November 22, 1983, when the Canadian Transport Commission approved the opening of a flyunder. The grade separation structure allowed Lakeshore West trains to travel to and from the USRC's northernmost tracks, and trains using the Georgetown corridor to cross over Lakeshore West trains to and from the USRC's southern tracks.

The TTR owned and operated the USRC until it was purchased by GO Transit in 2000. GO Transit was merged with the Greater Toronto Transportation Authority in 2009, and became a division of the authority under the name Metrolinx, which assumed ownership of all capital infrastructure assets such as the USRC. In 2014, Metrolinx began a major upgrade and modernization of the 80-year-old signalling system, at a cost of $365.5 million (equivalent to $479 million in 2025). This was in anticipation of GO Transit ridership doubling in the coming decades.

TTR is contracted, and continues to operate and maintain the USRC.

== Future ==
As part of Metrolinx's Regional Express Rail initiatives, rail infrastructure in the eastern portion of the USRC will be expanded or modified to allow more trains. This will include increasing the number of mainline tracks, expansion of the Don Yard, and increasing train speed limits. In addition, there are plans to create a new GO station in the proximity of North Bathurst Yard, near Front and Bathurst streets.

== Notes ==
- Riddell, John (1994). The Railways of Toronto, Volume Two.
