= Hawker Siddeley RTC-85SP/D =

Canadian railway coach and diesel multiple units

RTC-85 SP or RTC-85SPD
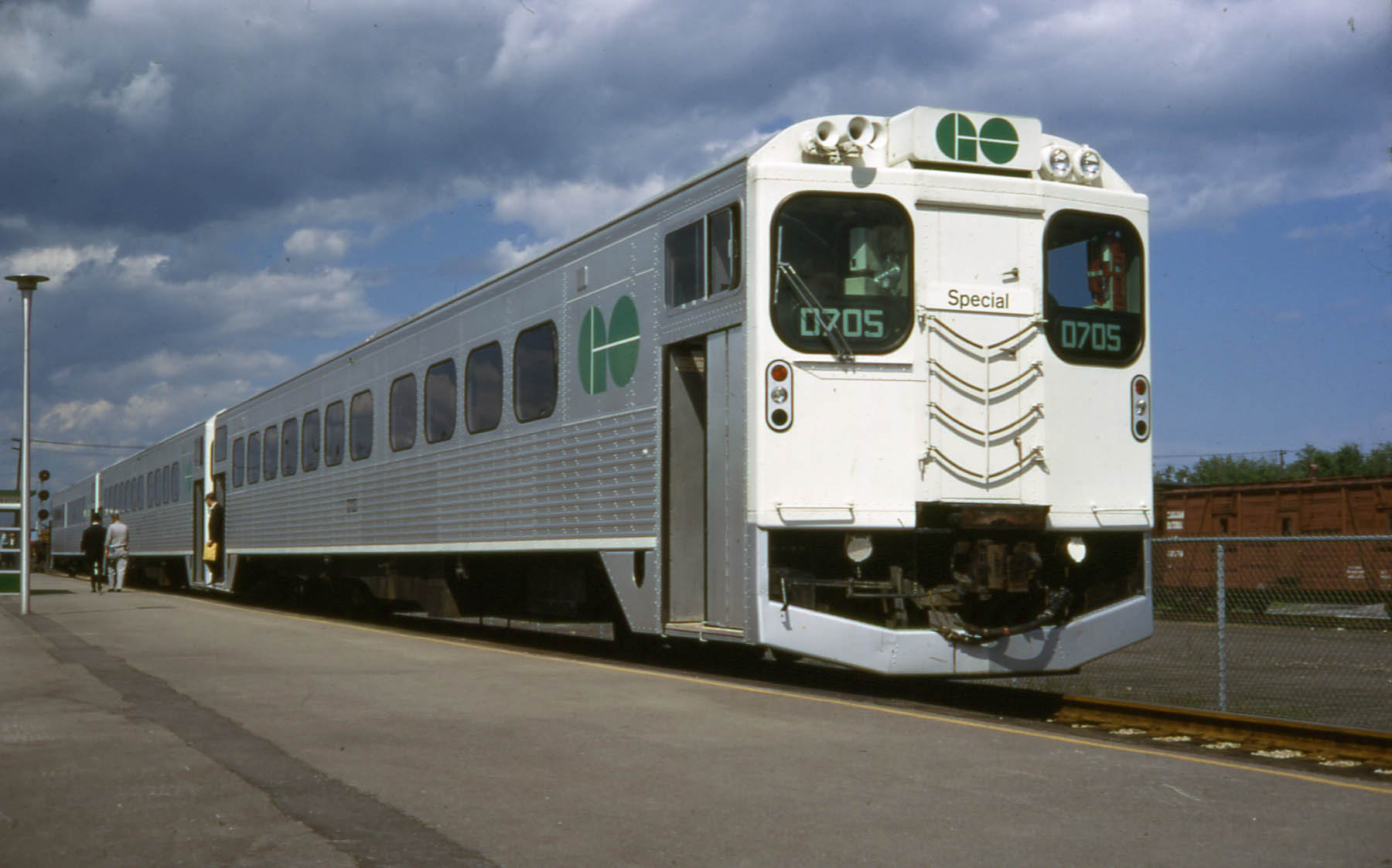
- Hawker Siddeley RTC-85 series cars on a GO Transit train in 1968.
- Manufacturer: Hawker Siddeley
- Built at: Can-Car Rail Plant Fort William (Thunder Bay), Ontario
- Family name: Hawker Siddeley H-series
- Replaced: Hawker Siddeley Canada Bi-Level Coach I and II
- Entered service: 1968–1980s
- Refurbished: 1975 by Ontario Northland Railway
- Number built: 117
- Number in service: 110
- Number scrapped: 7
- Formation: as self-propelled unit and later as cab cars by GO Transit; ONR operates them as passenger cars
- Fleet numbers: GO Transit - 1000–1031, 100–107, (C750–C757 and 4700–4731 and renumbered 9850–9857 and 9900–9931 1970), 108–116 (D700–D708, then renumbered 9825–9833 1970), 1032–1045 (4740–4753, then renumbered 9932–9945 1970), 1046–1075 (9946–9975 1974), 1076–1105
- Capacity: 92 seated
- Operators: GO Transit; Ontario Northland Railway; Agence métropolitaine de transport (now Exo (public transit)); MARC Train

Specifications
- Car body construction: Aluminum
- Car length: approximately 85 ft (25.91 m)
- Width: approx. 3.14 m (10 ft 3 5/8 in)
- Doors: 4 sets (2 sets per side) per car
- Track gauge: 1,435 mm (4 ft 8 1/2 in) standard gauge

Hawker Siddeley RTC-85/SP/D were a series of railway coach and diesel multiple units manufactured by Hawker Siddeley Canada for GO Transit, largely based on the H-series subway cars that they built for the Toronto Transit Commission.

Their name was derived as follows: Rapid Transit Coach 85' long Self-Propelled Double-end.

47 92-seat RTC cars were ordered and delivered to GO Transit in 1967, with 7 of them being built as single-level self-propelled units # D700, D701, D702 to D708 (later renumbered as 9825-9826, 9827-9833), 8 built as unpropelled cab cars (C750 to C757, later 9850 to 9857) and the remaining 32 as regular coaches (4700 to 4731, later 9900 to 9931). With additional cars being built until 1976, the eventual total of the fleet would number 117 cars. All cars were built at Hawker's Thunder Bay, Ontario plant. In 1975 the self-propelled cars were demotored and used as cab cars.

The motorized coaches were powered by a 330hp Rolls-Royce diesel engine, to be used in off-peak hours. They soon proved unable to keep up with traffic demands and were used with a diesel locomotive.

The car builder decided to go with a proven design based on their subway cars, thinking that if the GO Transit service wasn't a success, the cars could easily be sold to other transit agencies who already used their subway cars.

The cars (as designed) could hold 125 seats but GO Transit decided to have 92 seats installed, to avoid the cars feeling crowded. Features inside included large windows, bucket seating, armrests and card tables. The cars also had motorized doors for ease of access, with a two-trumpet whistle over the driver and lacked a snowplow.

The coaches soon proved unable to handle the large crowds along the lines and were replaced by the bi-level coaches now in service. The transit agency would never order single-level coaches after these were retired.

All cars were withdrawn from service and sold off by GO Transit by 1995 with 6 scrapped and remaining sold to other operators:

- 23 to Ontario Northland Railway, used on the now-retired (And possible revival) Northlander and in service between Cochrane and Moosonee on the Little Bear mixed train (until 2007), the summer time Polar Bear Express (until 2007) and the year-round Polar Bear Express mixed train (starting in 2007). Several of the coaches were extensively refurbished for a second time starting in 2016, most to a 48-seat configuration
- 92 to Agence métropolitaine de transport (now RTM) (now retired)
- 11 cars to Pandrol-Jackson Electric Tamper and Equipment Company as crew-cars for rail grinding operations

In 2017, Car 104 was re-purchased and restored by GO Transit to celebrate their 50th anniversary. The cab car is now displayed at the Toronto Railway Museum in downtown Toronto.

== Gallery ==
Car 104 at the Toronto Railway Museum

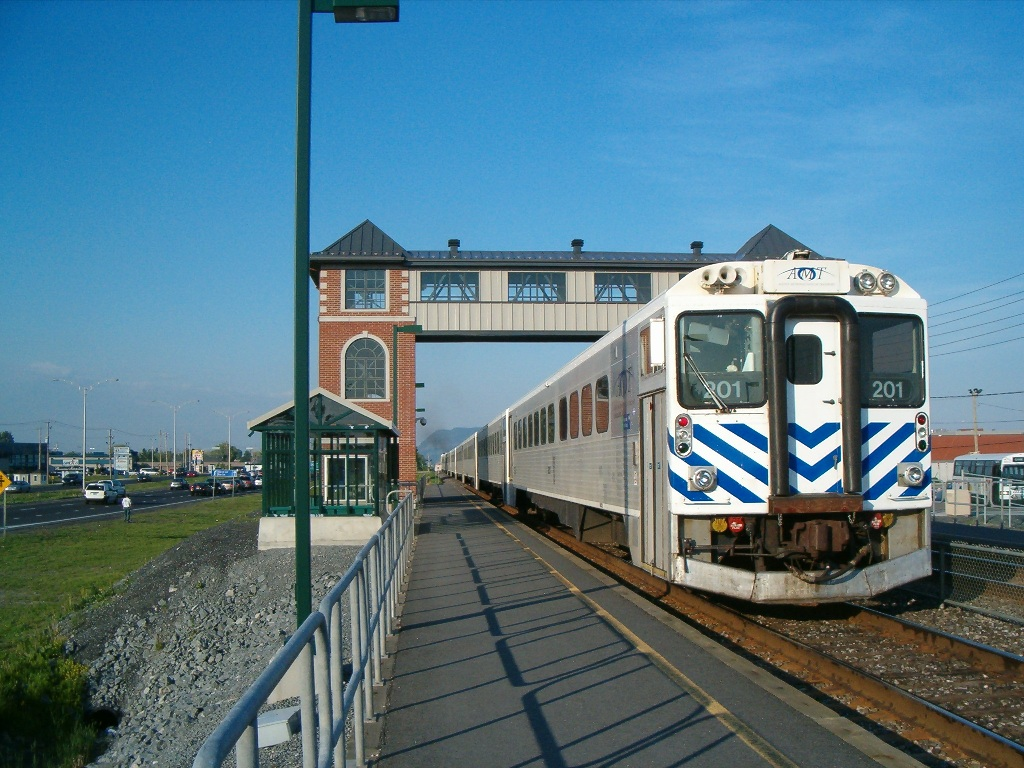
The cars on the AMT

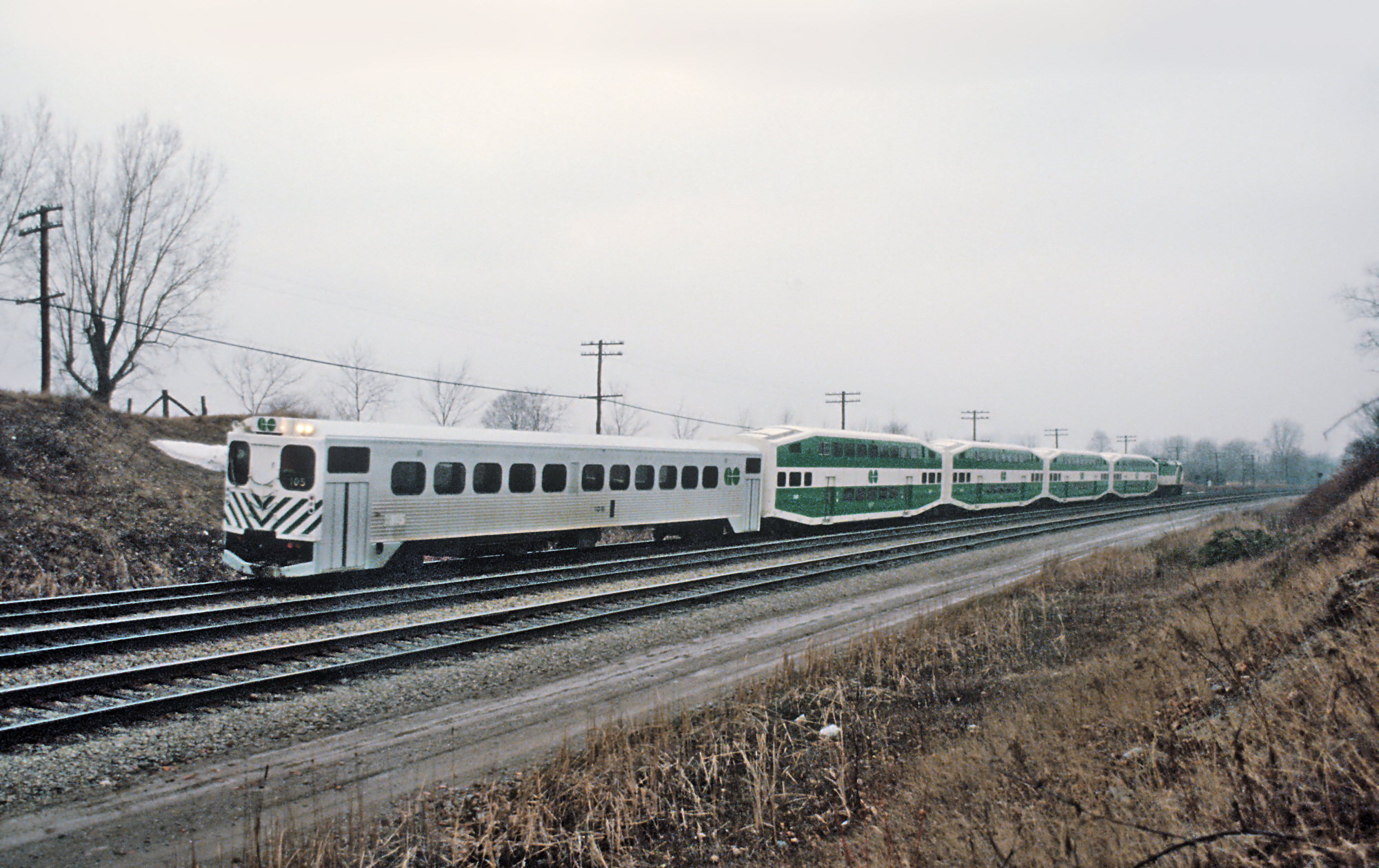
RTC cab car used with bi-level coaches with a locomotive pushing from the rear
