= Cummins X Series engine =

Type of diesel engine

The Cummins X-series engine is an inline-6 diesel engine produced by Cummins for heavy duty trucks and motorcoaches, designed to replace the N14 in 2001 when US emissions regulations made the N14 obsolete. Originally called the "Signature" series engine, the ISX uses Cummins's "Interactive System" for fuel control. This engine is widely used in on-highway and vocational trucks and is available in power ranging from 430 hp (320 kW) to 620 hp (460 kW) and 2,050 lb⋅ft (2,780 N⋅m). The QSX is the off-highway version of the ISX, and is used for industrial, marine, oil & gas and other off-highway applications. Cummins also produced a version for the RV market with 650 hp (480 kW) and 1,950 lb⋅ft (2,640 N⋅m).

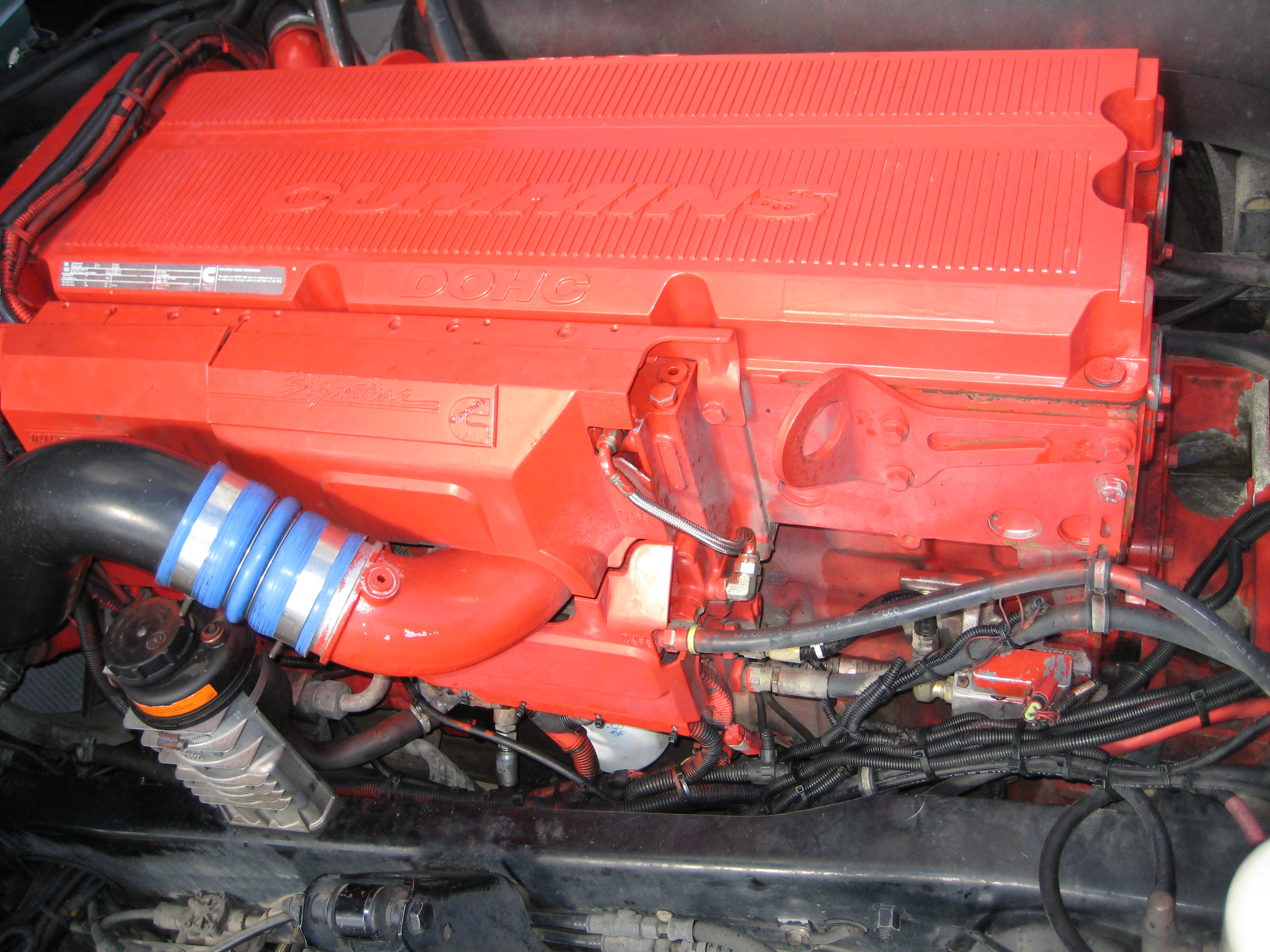
Cummins ISX 600

== History ==
Until 2010 this engine was a dual overhead cam design with one cam actuating the injectors and the other the valve train. This injection system is known as HPI (high pressure injection) where the injectors are cam-actuated to create injection pressure. The fuel system uses an Integrated Fuel System Module (IFSM) with a lift pump, gear pump, pressure regulators, shutoff valve, metering and timing actuators to deliver fuel to the injectors. It has a one piece valve cover that is either plastic or on older models a chrome plated steel cover otherwise known as the Signature 600 or ISX CM570.

In 2002, the ISX CM870 brought cooled exhaust gas recirculation (EGR) which takes exhaust gas and recirculates it back into the intake of the engine lowering the combustion chamber temperatures limiting the formation of NOx.

In 2008, Cummins unveiled the ISX CM871, this engine featured a Diesel Particulate Filter (DPF) which trapped the particulate matter or "soot" produced in the engine. With the help of the Diesel Oxidation Catalyst (DOC) the soot trapped in the DPF is oxidized and turned to ash during a process called regeneration. In motorhomes this was available as a 600 or 650 HP version.

The current EPA 2010 version known as ISX15 CM2250 features enhanced exhaust gas recirculation, diesel particulate filter and selective catalytic reduction (SCR), also known as urea injection. SCR consists of a diesel exhaust fluid (DEF - composed of urea and water) injection system: holding tank, pump, controller, and injector and an SCR catalyst brick. DEF is heated, pumped and injected into a decomposition tube which then reacts with the exhaust reducing NOX. The ISX15 CM2250 and CM2350 has eliminated the injector camshaft due to the advent of the common rail fuel system in which the fuel is pressurized from a high pressure, multiple piston pump, transferred through tubing to a rail where fuel is stored under extremely high pressures up to 35,000 psi.

In 2023, Cummins unveiled the X10 and X15N engines. The X10 is slated to replace the X12 and L9 in the truck market as it was made to serve both heavy duty and medium duty truck applications. The X15N is a CNG version of the X15, and is expected to release in 2025 with the same performance as the X15.

== Models ==
Model	Fuel	Bore x stroke	Displacement	Years of Production	Notes
X10	Diesel		10 L	Planned for 2026 onward	Launching before EPA 2027 takes effect Slated to replace X12 in Vocational & Regional Haul Slated to replace L9
ISX12	Diesel	130 mm × 150 mm	11.9 L	2010–2020	Phasing out started in 2018
X12	Diesel	132 mm × 144 mm	11.8 L	2018–2026	
ISX12 G	Natural Gas	130 mm × 150 mm	11.9 L	2013–2018	Phasing out started in 2017
ISX12N	Natural Gas	130 mm × 150 mm	11.9 L	2018–present	Replaced ISX12 G Built on the X12 block
X15N	Natural Gas	137 mm × 169 mm	14.9 L	Planned for 2024 onward	
X15H	Hydrogen	137 mm × 169 mm	14.9 L	Planned for 2027 onward	Testing in progress
ISX15	Diesel	137 mm × 169 mm	14.9 L	2010–2020	Phasing out started in 2016
X15	Diesel	137 mm × 169 mm	14.9 L	2016–present	Replaced ISX15

== Emissions control ==
The Cummins ISX diesel engine can be run in a dual fuel configuration, meaning it can properly operate on diesel fuel and natural gas. The burning of a natural gas alternative preserves diesel thermal efficiencies. The more efficient engine can produce less emissions in turn. The ISX can achieve this by altering ignition delay and injection timing. By examining the start of combustion (SOC), the engine's computer is able to employ a predictive ignition delay correlation. The predictive characteristics of the engine maximize both efficiency and useful power for the given fuel source. Compensations are made for the natural gas so that the power band and operating range are still functional for customers, while reducing emissions. Testing has also been done with the Cummins ISX by the EPA for natural gas usage that yielded results of major NOx emissions reduction. The configuration boasts ninety percent lower NOx emissions than the current EPA standard. This makes the Cummins ISX that burns natural gas one of the cleanest running diesel engines in the world.

The ISX uses a diesel particulate filter (DPF) to filter solid particles out of the exhaust as required by EPA regulations, reducing tailpipe emissions. The DPF installed in ISX engines requires regular maintenance because of its intricate design. The emissions control system institutes a filter regeneration from time to time to burn off the accumulated particulates, but any non-combustible materials (such as those in lubrication additives) will remain in the DPF afterwards, which can cause back pressure from the filter and loss of efficiency. This means the DPF needs to be regularly removed and cleaned. An ash-less oil could make this cleaning unnecessary, but also inhibit lubrication. A zero-phosphorus oil has been studied and found to be effective for DPF systems and lubrication. The oil displays passing results for both piston deposits and oil consumption, which means the DPF system would be optimized with use of zero-phosphorus, ultra low sulfur oil.

The Cummins ISX also uses diesel exhaust fluid (DEF) in models built after it became an EPA requirement. The DEF system injects urea to reduce diesel emissions. The ISX is required to have inhibitors in place to compensate for certain failures of the DEF system. When the DEF tank is low or empty, the engine reduces power by twenty-five percent. Power cuts and driver warnings are also used when the DEF system has been tampered with or is not functioning properly. Cummins has corrected several malfunctions and conducted several million miles of on-road customer-based research to make the ISX's DEF system as functional as possible.

== Technology ==
In early ISX engines an anti backlash gear train is used. The anti backlash gears allow the engine to operate with minimal gear rattle. Cummins uses a gear train in the front of the engine which is inherently noisy. The anti backlash gearing makes the engine less noisy due to the reduced rattle while in operation. The anti backlash gear train comes at a cost of efficiency. The Cummins ISX 15 model equipped with anti backlash gearing suffers a friction loss. The gears must overcome more friction throughout their moving range than a standard gear. A standard gear in a Cummins ISX 15 needs to overcome 0.75 Newton meters of torque, while the anti backlash gearing needs to overcome approximately 5 Newton meters of torque.

== Cummins Signature Series ==
Starting in 1998 the Cummins Signature was released to the Australian market to replace the out going N14. The Signature was produced up until 2003, In 2003 the highly popular Oceania exclusive was released this being the Gen 2 Cummins Signature. It built upon and improved on the original Cummins Signature. 2008 saw the third Signature revision this was the Signature EGR which utilized the same technology as the ISX EGR range. 2012 brought along the Gen 2 EGR line.
