= Bombardier BiLevel Coach =

Bilevel passenger rail car

BiLevel
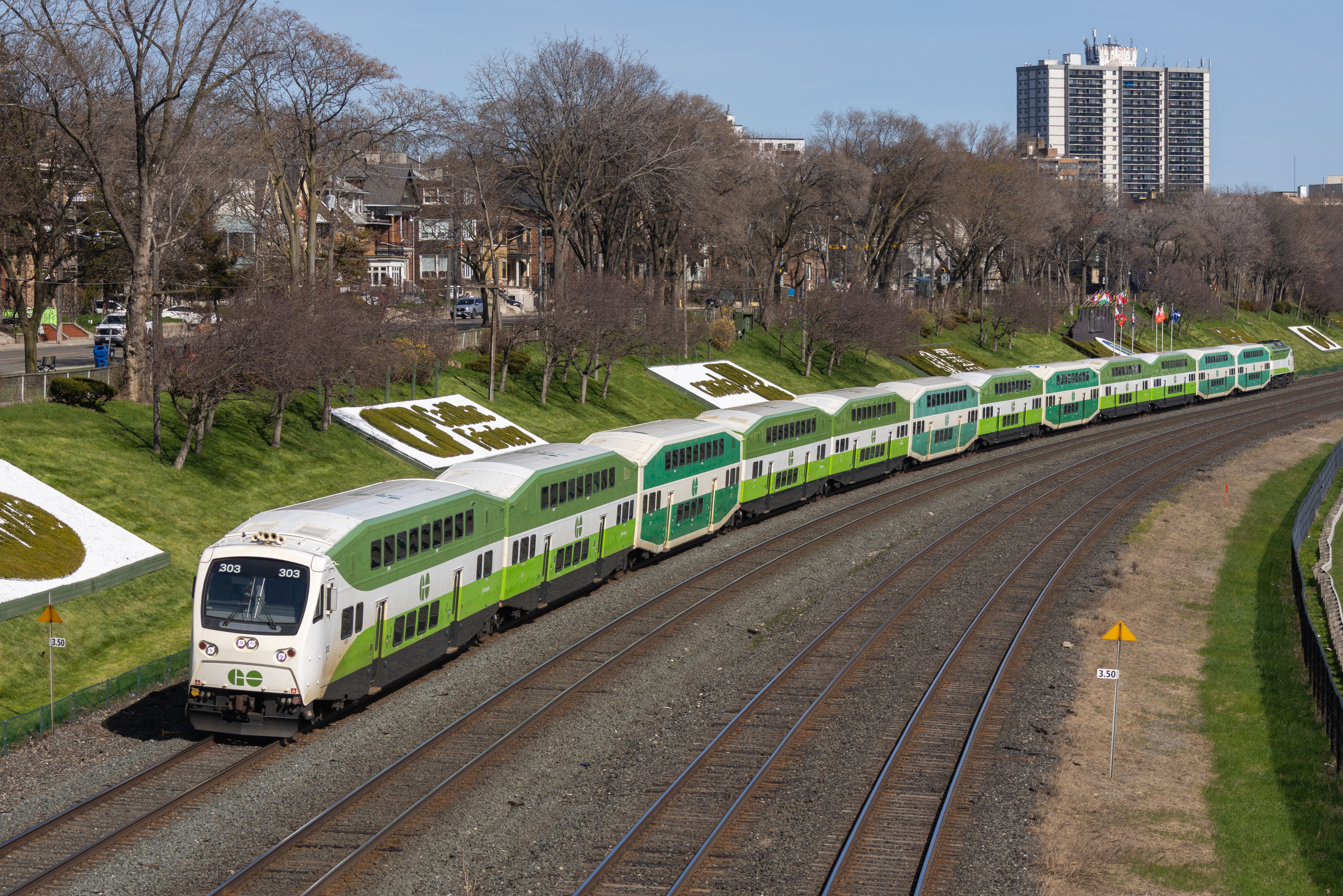
- A 12-car GO Transit train with 11 BiLevel coaches and 1 cab car in 2026

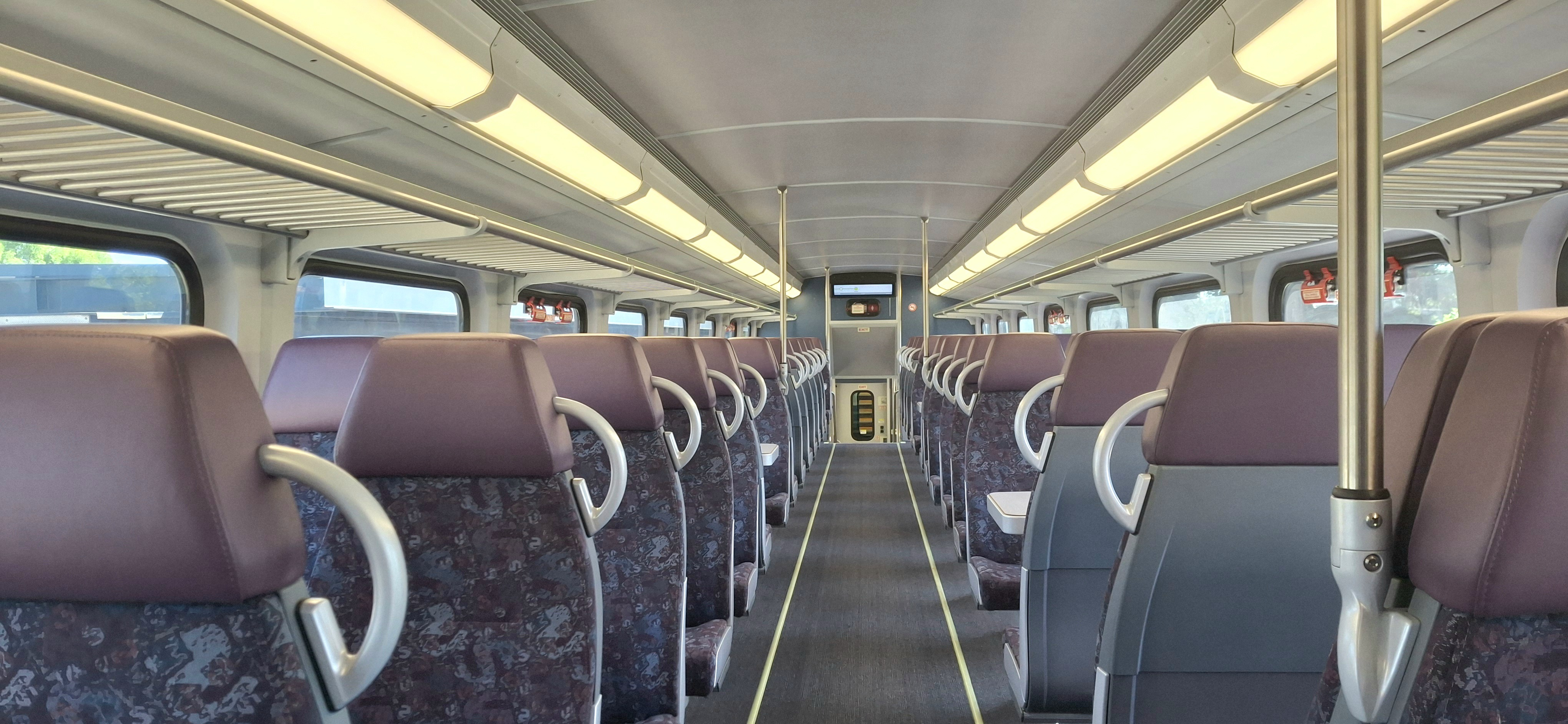
- Interior of the upper level of a Sounder commuter rail BiLevel coach
- Manufacturers: Hawker Siddeley / Can Car / UTDC (1976–1992); Bombardier (1992–2021); Alstom (since 2021)
- Built at: Thunder Bay, ON
- Constructed: 1976–present
- Entered service: 1976
- Number under construction: 65
- Number built: 1,510
- Formation: Single car
- Capacity: 136 to 162 seated; 276 standees
- Operator: See § Operators

Specifications
- Car body construction: Riveted or welded aluminum body on a steel frame
- Car length: 25,908 mm (85 ft)
- Width: 3,000 mm (9 ft 10 in)
- Height: 4,851 mm (15 ft 11 in)
- Floor height: 460 mm (18 in)
- Platform height: 200 mm (8 in)
- Entry: Step
- Doors: 2 sets of bi-parting automatic doors per side
- Wheelbase: 2,590 mm (8 ft 6 in)
- Maximum speed: 160 km/h (100 mph)
- Weight: Coach: 49,450 kg (109,020 lb); Cab car: 50,910 kg (112,240 lb)
- Power supply: 480 or 575 V AC
- Braking systems: Pneumatic, tread and disc
- Coupling system: AAR type H
- Track gauge: 1,435 mm (4 ft 8 1/2 in) standard gauge

The BiLevel Coach is a bilevel passenger railcar designed for commuter rail service in North America and currently manufactured by Alstom. It was originally developed for GO Transit in the Greater Toronto Area in the mid-1970s and has since been used by commuter rail agencies in Canada and the United States. They have been previously manufactured by Hawker Siddeley, Urban Transportation Development Corporation (UTDC), SNC-Lavalin and Bombardier. Production began at the former Canadian Car and Foundry (Can Car) plant in Thunder Bay, Ontario, where the cars have continued to be built.

== History ==
The BiLevel Coach was developed in the mid-1970s at the request of the Government of Ontario as a higher-capacity alternative for GO Transit's commuter trains. By then, GO trains had grown to ten single-level coaches during peak periods, and increasing the height of the trains was considered preferable to making them longer. Hawker Siddeley Canada designed the cars with assistance from Dofasco and the Urban Transportation Development Corporation (UTDC). The first cars entered service with GO Transit in 1976.

The design was introduced to the United States by Tri-Rail in the Miami metropolitan area in 1989. By the end of 2020, 1,477 BiLevel coaches had been built for 14 North American operators.

Although the cars have undergone structural and equipment changes over time, the basic design has remained largely unchanged. The coaches have an octagonal cross-sectional profile, sometimes referred to as a "lozenge" because of its profile.

== Design ==
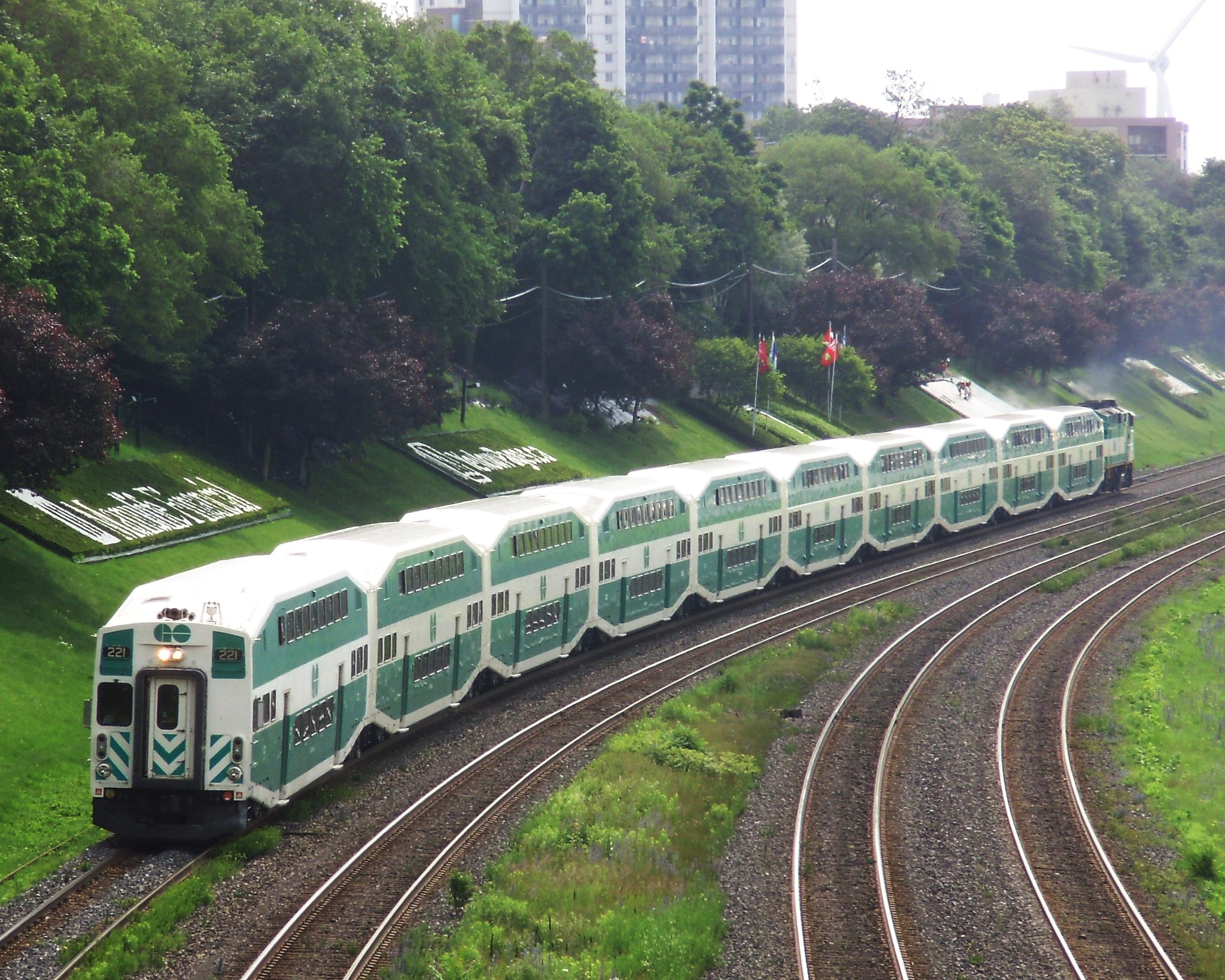
A 10-car GO Transit train with nine BiLevel coaches and one BiLevel cab car in 2008

The BiLevel has an aluminum body mounted on a steel floor that provides much of the car's structural strength and supports the trucks, draft gear, and other mechanical equipment. The aluminum body provides additional structural strength and encloses the passenger compartment. This construction allows the cars to have a relatively low weight compared with their size.

BiLevel coaches are approximately 15 feet 11 inches (4.85 m) high and 9 feet 10 inches (3.00 m) wide and weigh about 61,000 kg (134,000 lb). Depending on the configuration, the coaches have between 136 and 162 seats and can accommodate up to 276 standing passengers.

The car is arranged as four interconnected passenger spaces: upper and lower levels over the length of the car, with intermediate levels over the trucks. The passenger areas are largely open, with electrical and mechanical equipment is located beneath the floor, around the stairwells and above the intermediate levels. The lower-level floor is about 460 millimeters (18 in) above the rail and is typically used with low-platforms. The intermediate levels, where passengers pass between cars, are about 1,300 millimeters (51 in) above the rail, the typical height of single-level, high-floor cars.

The driver's cab of an older Bombardier BiLevel cab car

One major variant is the cab car, which allows trains to operate in a push–pull configuration without turning the locomotive at terminal stations.

The coaches have undergone several design changes since their introduction in the 1970s. The original coaches had five large windows on each lower level between two large doorways, riveted aluminum side panels, and a washroom at one end of the intermediate level. Cab cars did not have a washroom because the space was occupied by the cab. Conductors had sliding windows with door controls on the upper level. The original cab design was small and had a single engineer's window. The original design remained in production until 1992.

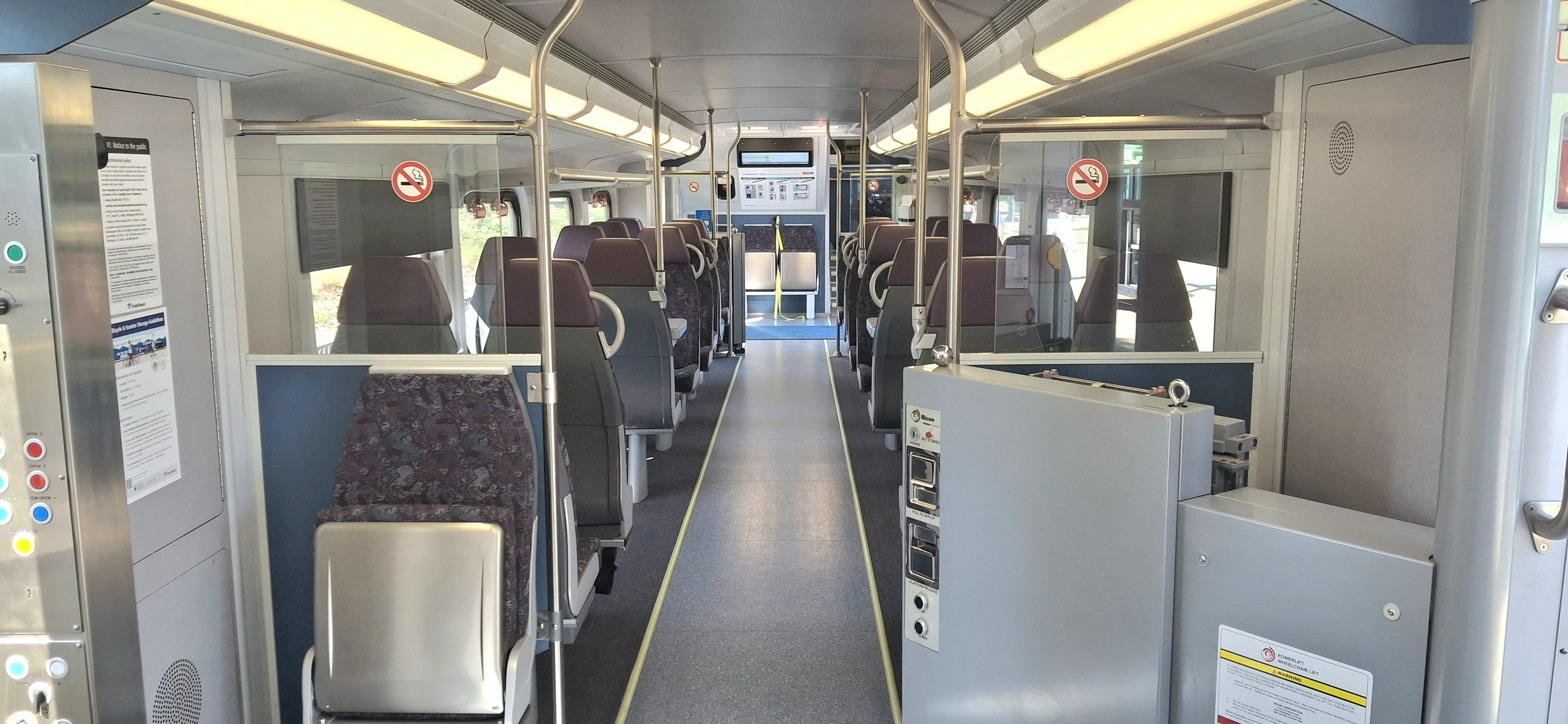
Lower level view of a Bombardier Bilevel coach

In 1992, a redesigned version was introduced by Metrolink with changes intended to improve accessibility. The washroom was moved from the intermediate level to the lower level beneath the stairs. This required one of the two doorways closest to the washroom to be moved toward the center of the car, eliminating one lower-level window and giving the car a slightly asymmetric layout. Some operators have swapped out the washroom for a small café service area. Door controls for conductors were also moved to the lower level. In the mid-1990s a larger full-width cab with two windows was introduced.

Beginning in 1997, the coaches were built with welded aluminum exterior panels, replacing the riveted construction used on earlier cars as welding technology improved. The new design had smooth side panels and a transverse structural rib above the intermediate-level windows, while retaining the basic arrangement of the earlier coaches.

In 2014, the design was substantially revised to incorporate crash-energy management (CEM) features. The redesigned coaches use additional steel, push-back couplers, and crumple zones at the ends of the intermediate level to absorb energy in a collision. The changes reduced the size of the intermediate level and eliminated one of its windows. The cab was also redesigned, with the engineer seated higher and farther from the front of the car, with a crumple zone between the engineer and the front of the cab. The new cab design eliminated the front door of the cab car, preventing passage between cars when the cab car is positioned within a train consist.

== Comparison with other Bombardier bilevel coaches ==
Bombardier also produced the MultiLevel and Double-deck Coach. The MultiLevel conforms to a smaller loading gauge than the BiLevel and was designed for routes with tighter clearances, including the Northeast Corridor and the Mont Royal Tunnel in Montreal. Its doors are positioned on the middle level to serve high-level platforms. The Double-deck Coach was designed for the German market and conforms to the German loading gauge, with a profile that narrows toward the upper level.

== Series ==
Series	Operators	Builder
I	GO Transit	Hawker Siddeley Canada/Can Car
II	GO Transit, Metrolink	Hawker Siddeley Canada/Can Car
III	GO Transit, Metrolink	UTDC/Can Car
IV	GO Transit, Tri-Rail	UTDC/Can Car
V	GO Transit, Tri-Rail	UTDC/Can Car
VI	GO Transit, West Coast Express, Sounder, Altamont Corridor Express, Trinity Railway Express, Tri-Rail, Metrolink, Coaster, Caltrain	Bombardier Transportation/Alstom
VII	GO Transit, FrontRunner, Northstar, SunRail, Trinity Railway Express, New Mexico Rail Runner Express, Sounder, Exo, Metrolink	Bombardier Transportation/Alstom
VIII	GO Transit	Bombardier Transportation/Alstom
IX	GO Transit, Sounder, SunRail, Altamont Corridor Express	Bombardier Transportation/Alstom
X	GO Transit, Coaster	Bombardier Transportation/Alstom

== Operators ==
=== Current operators ===
Operator	Location	Quantity	Image
Altamont Corridor Express	Tri-Valley, California; Bay Area, California	30	
Caltrain	Bay Area, California	41	
Coaster	San Diego, California	28	
Exo	Montreal, Quebec	22	
FrontRunner	Salt Lake City, Utah	22	
GO Transit	Toronto, Ontario	979	
Metrolink	Los Angeles, California	184	
Rail Runner Express	Albuquerque, New Mexico	22	
Sounder	Seattle, Washington	58	
SunRail	Orlando, Florida	25	
Tri-Rail	Miami, Florida	26	
Trinity Railway Express	Dallas, Texas	17	
Trinity Railway Express	Dallas, Texas	5	
West Coast Express	Vancouver, British Columbia	44	

=== Future operators ===
Operator	Location	Quantity	Notes
Amtrak California	Northern California	16	13 coaches and 3 cab cars to be leased from Caltrain.
Hiawatha (Amtrak)	Chicago, Illinois; Milwaukee, Wisconsin	3	Will be leased from Northstar after the line shuts down

=== Former operators ===
Operator	Location	Quantity	Image	Notes
Northstar Line	Minneapolis, Minnesota	18		Line shut down in 2026, some cars to be leased to other operators.
