= Toronto streetcar system =

Streetcar network in Ontario, Canada, since 1861

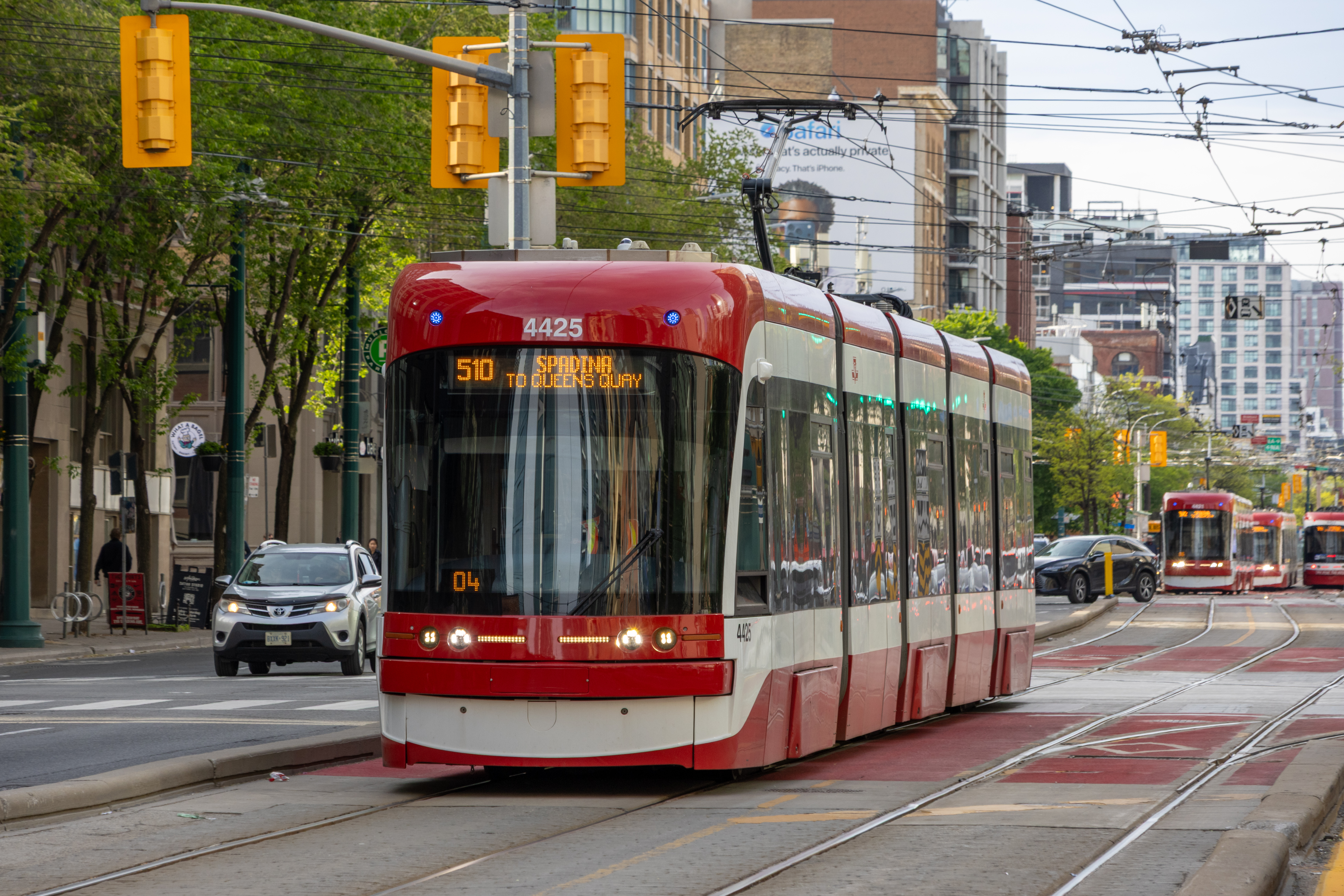
- Flexity Outlook streetcar on Spadina Avenue

Overview
- Locale: Toronto, Ontario, Canada
- Transit type: Streetcar
- Number of lines: 11
- Number of stations: 685 stops
- Daily ridership: 368,500 (weekdays, Q2 2026)
- Annual ridership: 79,295,000 (2025)

Operation
- Began operation: 1861; 165 years ago; 1892; 134 years ago (catenary electrification)
- Operator: Toronto Transit Commission
- Character: Street running

Technical
- System length: 83 km (52 mi)
- Track gauge: 1,495 mm (4 ft 10 7/8 in) Toronto gauge
- Minimum radius of curvature: 36 ft 0 in (10,973 mm)
- Electrification: Overhead line, 600 V DC
System map

The Toronto streetcar system is a network of eleven streetcar routes in Toronto, Ontario, Canada, operated by the Toronto Transit Commission (TTC). It is the third busiest light-rail system in North America. The network is concentrated primarily in Downtown Toronto and in proximity to the city's waterfront. Much of the streetcar route network dates from the second half of the 19th century. Three streetcar routes operate in their own right-of-way, one in a partial right-of-way, and six operate on street trackage shared with vehicular traffic with streetcars stopping on demand at frequent stops like buses. Since 2020, the network has operated using only low-floor streetcars, making it fully accessible.

Toronto's streetcars provide most of the downtown core's surface transit service. Four of the TTC's five most heavily used surface routes are streetcar routes. In 2025, the system had a ridership of 79,295,000, or about 368,500 per weekday as of the second quarter of 2026.

== History ==
=== Pre-TTC history (1861–1921) ===
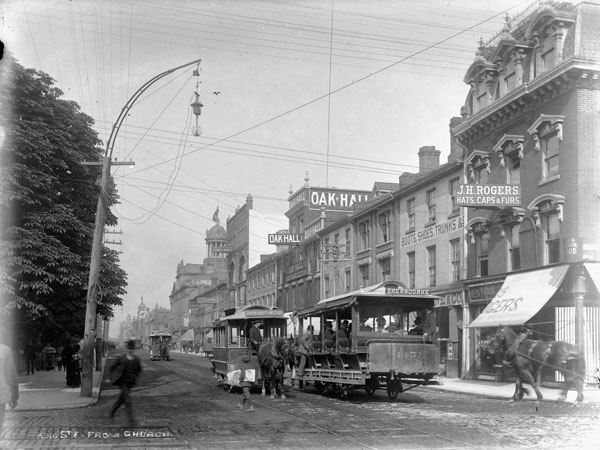
Horse-drawn Toronto Street Railway streetcars, 1890. By 1894, horse-drawn streetcars were replaced by electric streetcars.

The main predecessors of the TTC were:

- Toronto Street Railway (1861–1891)
- Toronto Railway Company (1891–1921)
- Toronto Civic Railways (1911–1921)

In 1861, the City of Toronto issued a thirty-year transit franchise (Resolution 14, By-law 353) for a horse-drawn street railway, after the Williams Omnibus Bus Line had become heavily loaded. Alexander Easton's Toronto Street Railway (TSR) opened the first street railway line in Canada on September 11, 1861, operating from Yorkville Town Hall to the St. Lawrence Market. At the end of the TSR franchise, the City government ran the railway for eight months but ended up granting a new thirty-year franchise to the Toronto Railway Company (TRC) in 1891. The TRC was the first operator of horseless streetcars in Toronto. The first electric car ran on August 15, 1892, and the last horse car ran on August 31, 1894, to meet franchise requirements.

There came to be problems with interpretation of the franchise terms for the City. By 1912, the city limits had extended significantly, with the annexation of communities to the north (1912: North Toronto) and the east (1908: Town of East Toronto) and the west (1909: the City of West Toronto—The Junction). After many attempts to force the TRC to serve these areas, the City created its own street railway operation, the Toronto Civic Railways (TCR) to do so, and built several routes. Repeated court battles forced the TRC to build new cars, but they were of old design. When the TRC franchise ended in 1921, the Toronto Transportation Commission was created, combining the city-operated Toronto Civic Railways lines into its new network.

=== Early TTC history (1921–1945) ===
The TTC began in 1921 as solely a streetcar operation, with the bulk of the routes acquired from the private TRC and merged with the publicly operated Toronto Civic Railways. In 1923, the TTC took over the Lambton, Davenport and Weston routes of the Toronto Suburban Railway (TSR) and integrated them into the streetcar system.

In 1925, routes were operated on behalf of the Township of York (as Township of York Railway), but the TTC was contracted to operate them. One of these routes was the former TSR Weston route and the others were the TTC Oakwood and Rogers Road streetcar routes. The Weston streetcar route was replaced by electric trolley buses in 1948, while Rogers Road route was replaced by the 63 Ossington trolley bus route in 1974; ultimately diesel bus routes replaced the trolley buses in 1992.

In 1927, the TTC became the operator of three radial lines of the former Toronto and York Radial Railway. The TTC connected these lines to the streetcar system in order to share equipment and facilities, such as carhouses, but the radials had their own separate management within the TTC's Radial Department. The last TTC-operated radial (North Yonge Railways) closed in 1948.

=== Plans for abandonment (1945–1989) ===
After the Second World War, many cities across North America and Europe began to eliminate their streetcar systems in favour of buses. During the 1950s, the TTC continued to invest in streetcars and the TTC took advantage of other cities' streetcar removals by purchasing extra PCC cars from Cleveland, Birmingham, Kansas City, and Cincinnati.

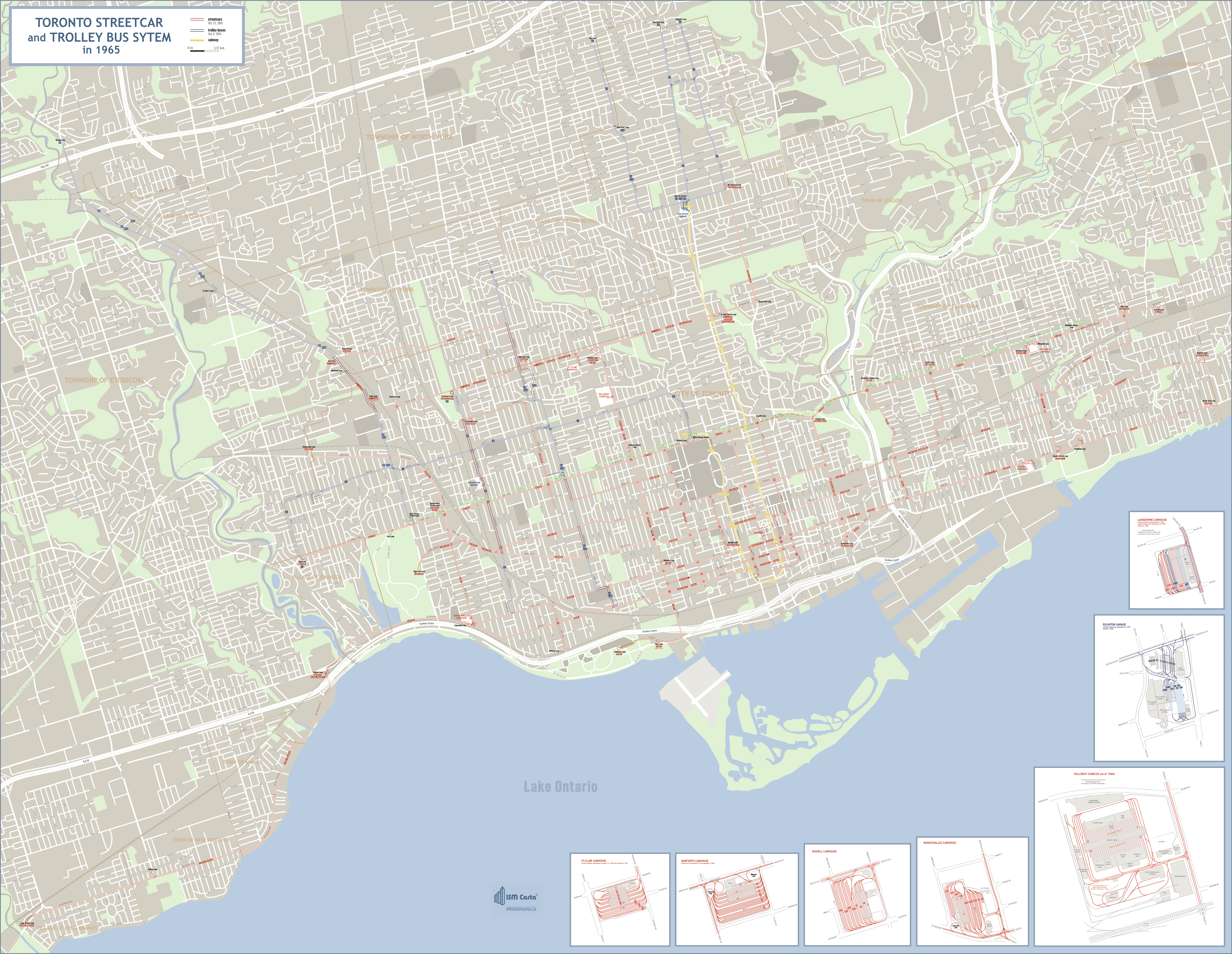
Streetcar and trolley bus routes in October 1965

In 1966, the TTC announced plans to eliminate all streetcar routes by 1980. Streetcars were considered out of date, and their elimination in almost all other cities made it hard to buy new vehicles and maintain the existing ones. Metro Toronto chair William Allen claimed in 1966 that "streetcars are as obsolete as the horse and buggy". Many streetcars were removed from service when Line 2 Bloor–Danforth opened in February 1966.

The plan to abolish the streetcar system was strongly opposed by many people in the city, and a group named "Streetcars for Toronto" was formed to work against the plan. The group was led by Professor Andrew Biemiller and transit advocate Steve Munro. It had the support of city councillors William Kilbourn and Paul Pickett, and urban advocate Jane Jacobs. Streetcars for Toronto presented the TTC board with a report that found retaining the streetcar fleet would, in the long run, be cheaper than converting to buses. This combined with a strong public preference for streetcars over buses changed the decision of the TTC board.

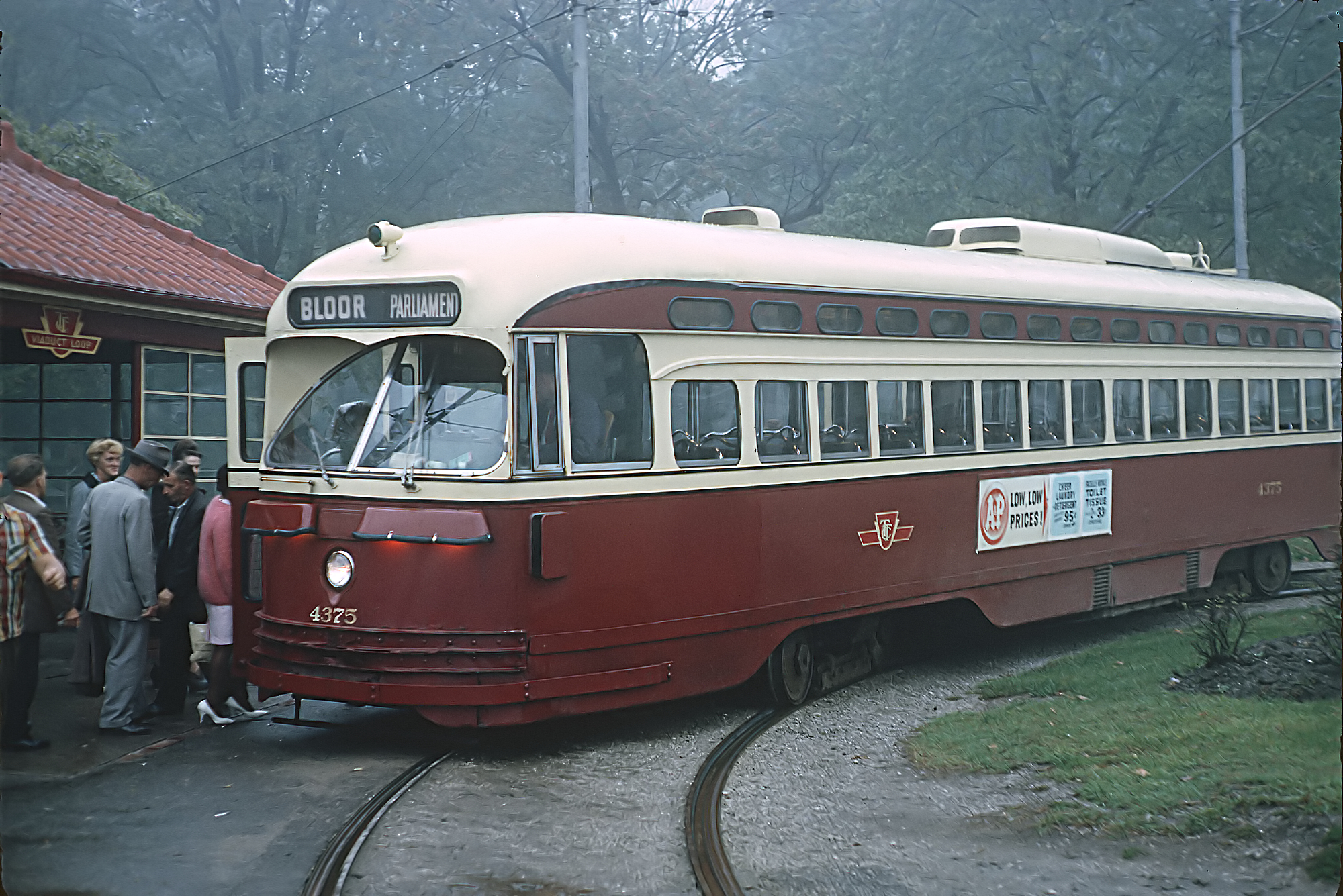
A Parliament line streetcar at Viaduct Loop. Parliament line was one of several streetcar routes discontinued in the 1960s.

The busiest north–south and east–west routes were replaced respectively by the Yonge–University and the Bloor–Danforth subway lines, and the northernmost streetcar lines, including the North Yonge and Oakwood routes, were replaced by trolley buses (and later by diesel buses). Two lines that operated north of St. Clair Avenue were also abandoned for other reasons. The Rogers Road route was abandoned to free up streetcars for expanded service on other routes. The Mount Pleasant route was removed because of complaints that streetcars slowed automobile traffic. Earlier, the TTC had contemplated abandonment because replacement by trolley buses was cheaper than replacing the aging tracks.

However, the TTC maintained most of its existing network, purchasing new custom-designed Canadian Light Rail Vehicles (CLRV) and Articulated Light Rail Vehicles (ALRV), with the first CLRV entering service in 1979. It also continued to rebuild and maintain the existing fleet of PCC (Presidents' Conference Committee) streetcars until they were no longer roadworthy.

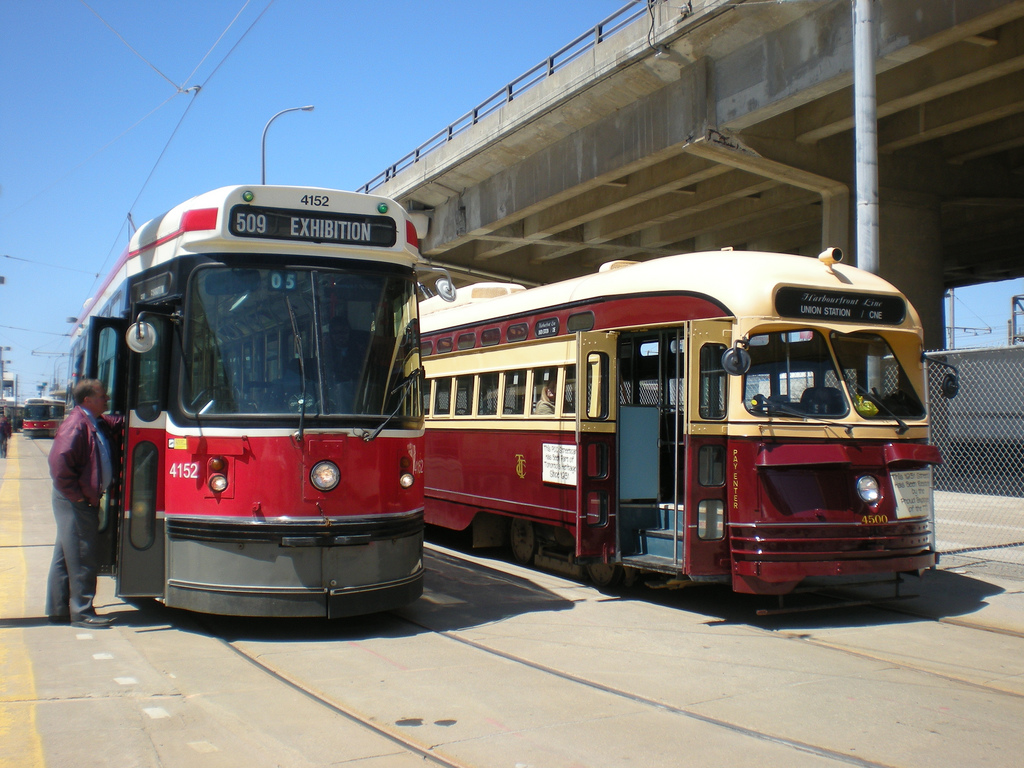
Two TTC streetcar models used in the 20th century. The CLRV model to the left entered service in 1979, eventually replacing the PCC model next to it.

Plans to assign route numbers to the streetcar lines, which had previously only carried route names, were announced in early 1978, and route numbers first came into use when the first CLRVs entered service in 1979. The PCC cars did not yet have route-number rollsigns, but they were later equipped with them, replacing the route-name signs, and route numbers began being displayed on PCC cars (on all routes) on February 4, 1980.

When Kipling station opened in 1980 as the new western terminus of Line 2 Bloor–Danforth, it had provision for a future streetcar or LRT platform opposite the bus platforms. However, there was no further development for a surface rail connection there.

In the early 1980s, a streetcar line was planned to connect Kennedy station to Scarborough Town Centre. However, as that line was being built, the Province of Ontario persuaded the TTC to switch to using a new technology called the Intermediate Capacity Transit System (now Bombardier Innovia Metro) by promising to pay for any cost overruns (which eventually amounted to over $100 million). Thus, the Scarborough RT (later renamed Line 3 Scarborough) was born, and streetcar service did not return to Scarborough, instead stopping at the limits at Victoria Park Avenue.

=== Late 20th-century expansion (1989–2000) ===
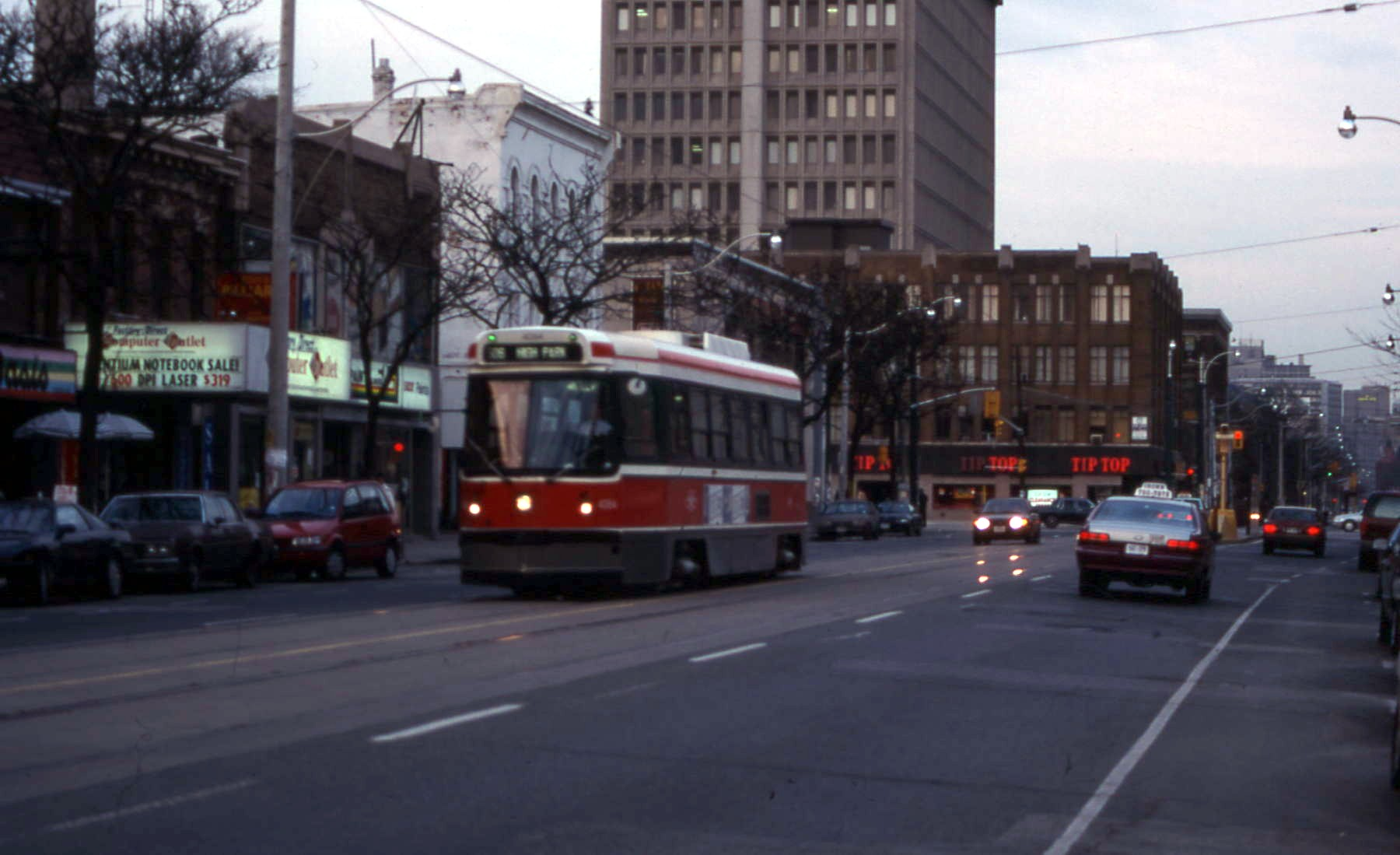
A CLRV streetcar on College Street in April 1997.

The TTC returned to building new streetcar routes in 1989. The first new line was route 604 Harbourfront, starting from Union station, travelling underneath Bay Street and rising to a dedicated centre median on Queen's Quay (along the edge of Lake Ontario) to the foot of Spadina Avenue. This route was lengthened northward along Spadina Avenue in 1997, continuing to travel in a dedicated right-of-way in the centre of the street, and ending in an underground terminal at Spadina station. At this time, the route was renamed 510 Spadina to fit with the numbering scheme of the other streetcar routes. This new streetcar service replaced the former route 77 Spadina bus and, since 1997, has provided the main north–south transit service through Toronto's Chinatown and the western boundary of University of Toronto's main campus, the St. George campus. The tracks along Queen's Quay were extended to Bathurst Street in 2000 to connect to the existing Bathurst route, providing for a new 509 Harbourfront route from Union station to the refurbished Exhibition Loop at the Exhibition grounds, where the annual Canadian National Exhibition is held during the summer.

=== 21st century (2001–present) ===
By 2003, two-thirds of the city's streetcar tracks were in poor condition as the older track was poorly built using unwelded rail attached to untreated wooden ties lying on loose gravel. The result was street trackage falling apart quickly requiring digging up everything after 10 to 15 years. Thus, the TTC started to rebuild tracks using a different technique. With the new technique, concrete is poured over compacted gravel, and the ties are placed in another bed of concrete, which is topped by more concrete to embed rail clips and rubber-encased rails. The resulting rail is more stable and quieter with less vibration. The new tracks are expected to last 25 years after which only the top concrete layer needs to be removed in order to replace worn rails.

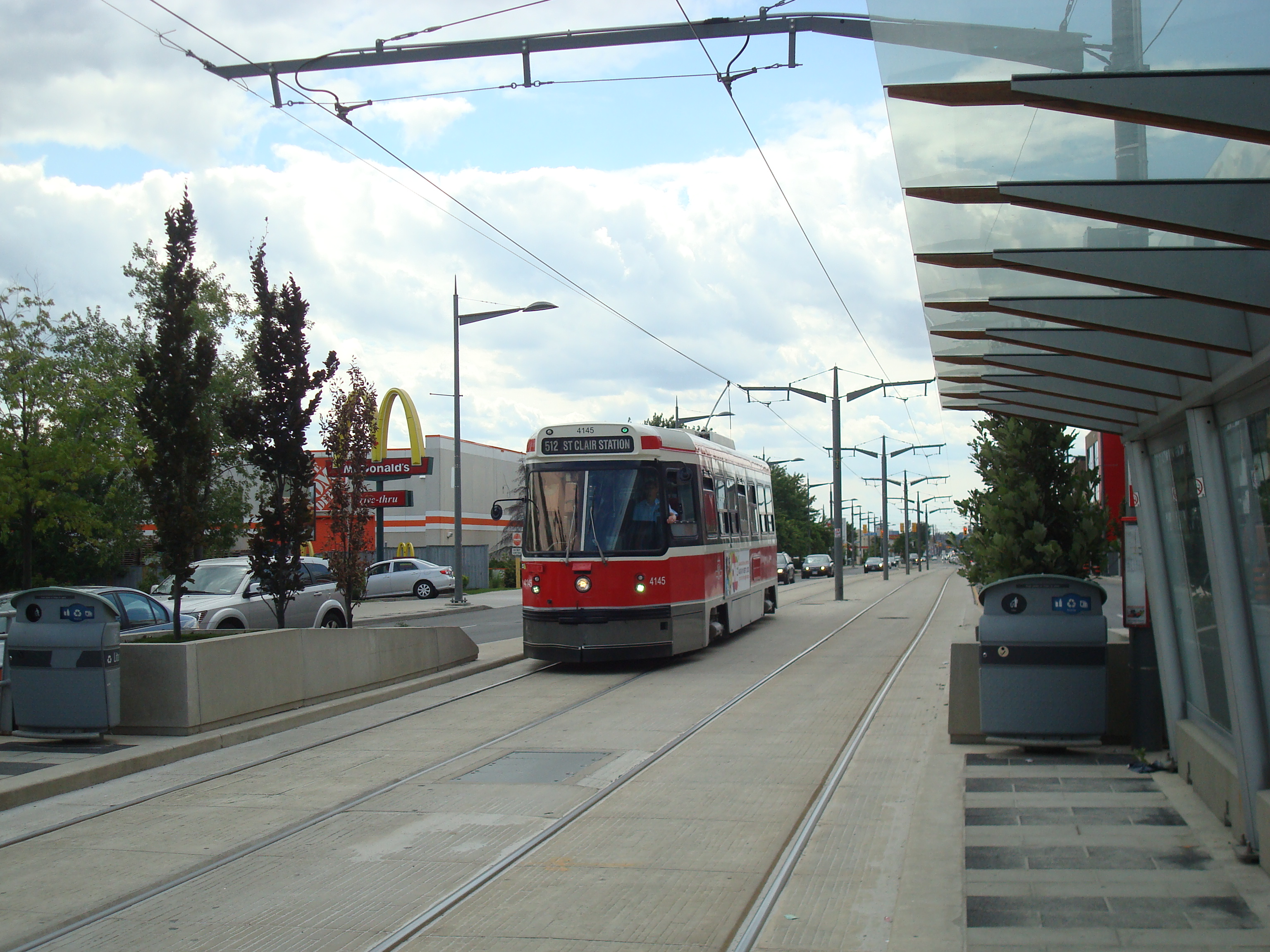
A CLRV streetcar operating on a reserved track on route 512 St. Clair. Dedicated right-of-way lanes were completed on route 512 in 2010.

Route 512 St. Clair was rebuilt to restore a separated right-of-way similar to that of the 510 on Spadina Avenue, to increase service reliability and was completed on June 30, 2010.

On December 19, 2010, 504 King streetcar service returned to Roncesvalles Avenue after the street was rebuilt to a new design, which provided a widened sidewalk "bumpout" at each stop to allow riders to board a streetcar directly from the curb. When no streetcar is present, cyclists may ride over the bumpout as it doubles as part of a bike lane.

On October 12, 2014, streetcar service resumed on 509 Harbourfront route after the street was rebuilt to a new design that replaced the eastbound automobile lanes with parkland from Spadina Avenue to York Street. Thus, streetcars since then run on a roadside right-of-way immediately adjacent to a park on its southern edge.

The Toronto Transit Commission eliminated all Sunday-only stops on June 7, 2015, as these stops slowed down streetcars making it more difficult to meet scheduled stops. Sunday stops, which served Christian churches, were deemed unfair to non-Christian places of worship, which never had the equivalent of a Sunday stop. Toronto originally created Sunday stops in the 1920s along its streetcar routes to help worshippers get to church on Sunday for religious services.

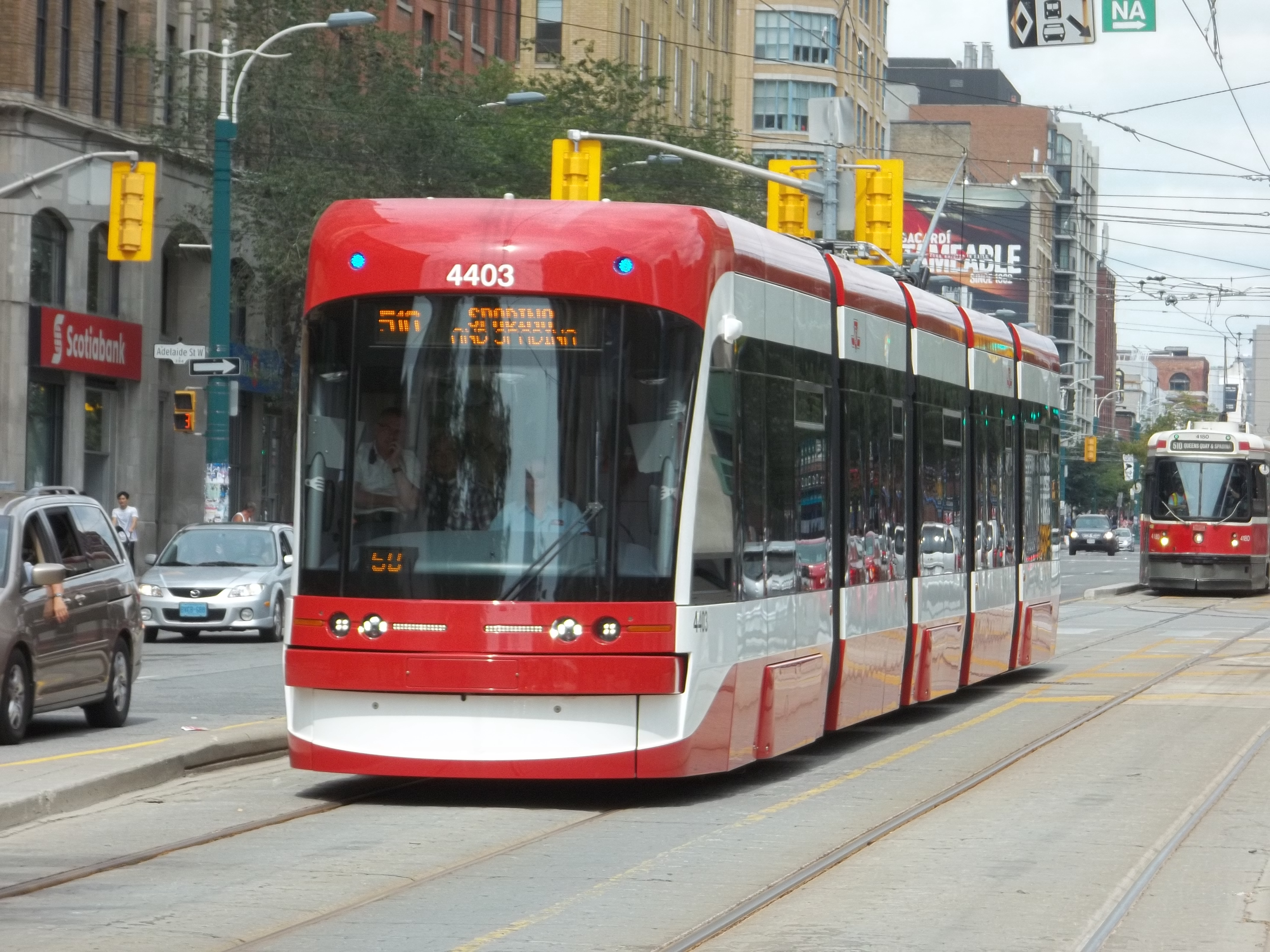
A Flexity Outlook streetcar on its first day of service, August 31, 2014, on route 510 Spadina

The first two Flexity Outlook streetcars entered service on route 510 Spadina, on August 31, 2014; at the same time, all-door boarding and proof-of-payment (POP) was introduced on all 510 Spadina streetcars. Fare payments by Presto on the Flexity cars was introduced on November 30, 2014. On November 22, 2015, the TTC started to operate its new fleet of Flexity Outlook streetcars from its new Leslie Barns maintenance and storage facility.

On December 14, 2015, the TTC expanded Presto, POP and all-door loading to include all streetcars on all routes. All streetcar passengers are required to carry proof that they have paid their fares such as a single-ride ticket; a paper transfer; or a tapped-in Presto card while riding. At the same time, the TTC also activated the option for customers to purchase single-ride tickets using debit or credit cards on the fare vending machines on Flexity streetcars.

With the January 3, 2016, service changes, 510 Spadina became the first wheelchair-accessible streetcar route using mainly Flexity streetcars. However, CLRV and ALRV streetcars were used in some cases as a backup plan in the event there were not enough Flexity streetcars.

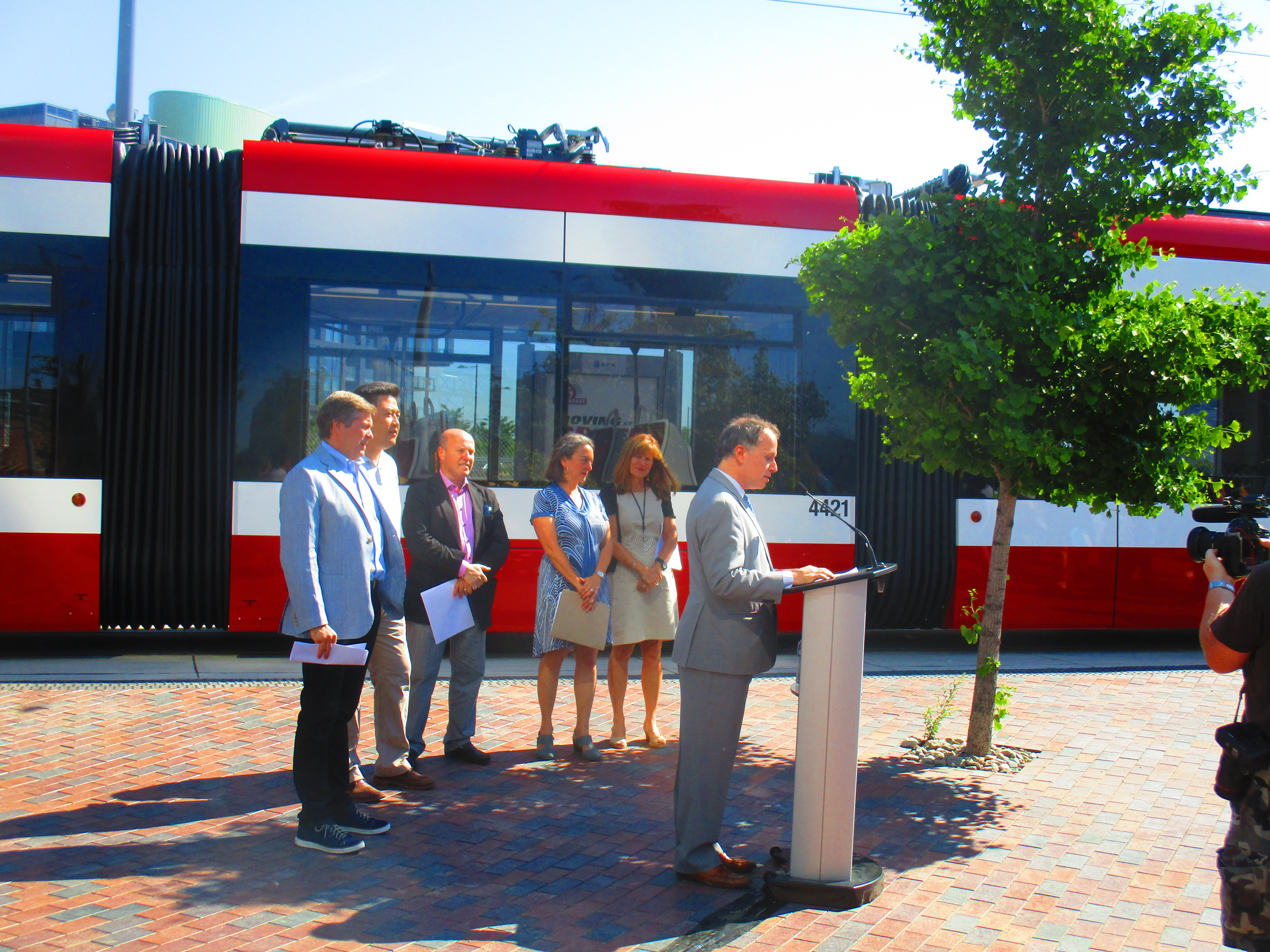
TTC chair Josh Colle speaking at the launch ceremony for 514 Cherry, in June 2016

On June 19, 2016, the TTC launched the 514 Cherry streetcar route to supplement 504 King service along King Street between Dufferin and Sumach streets. The new route operated every 15 minutes or better and initially used some and later only the commission's then-new accessible Flexity streetcars. The eastern end of the 514 route ran on a newly constructed branch, originally named the Cherry Street streetcar line, which is located in a reserved side-of-street right-of-way.

On September 12, 2017, 509 Harbourfront became the first streetcar route in Toronto to operate Flexity streetcars with electrical pickup by pantograph instead of trolley pole. That November, the King Street Transit Priority Corridor, a transit mall, was established along King Street between Bathurst and Jarvis streets.

On October 7, 2018, the 514 Cherry route was permanently cancelled. The service it provided was replaced by the 504 King, which was divided into two overlapping branches, each to one of the termini (Dufferin Gate Loop and Distillery Loop) of the former 514 route. That December, the TTC eliminated the option for passengers to purchase single-ride tickets by credit and debit cards on the Flexity streetcars due to reliability issues with the fare vending machines.

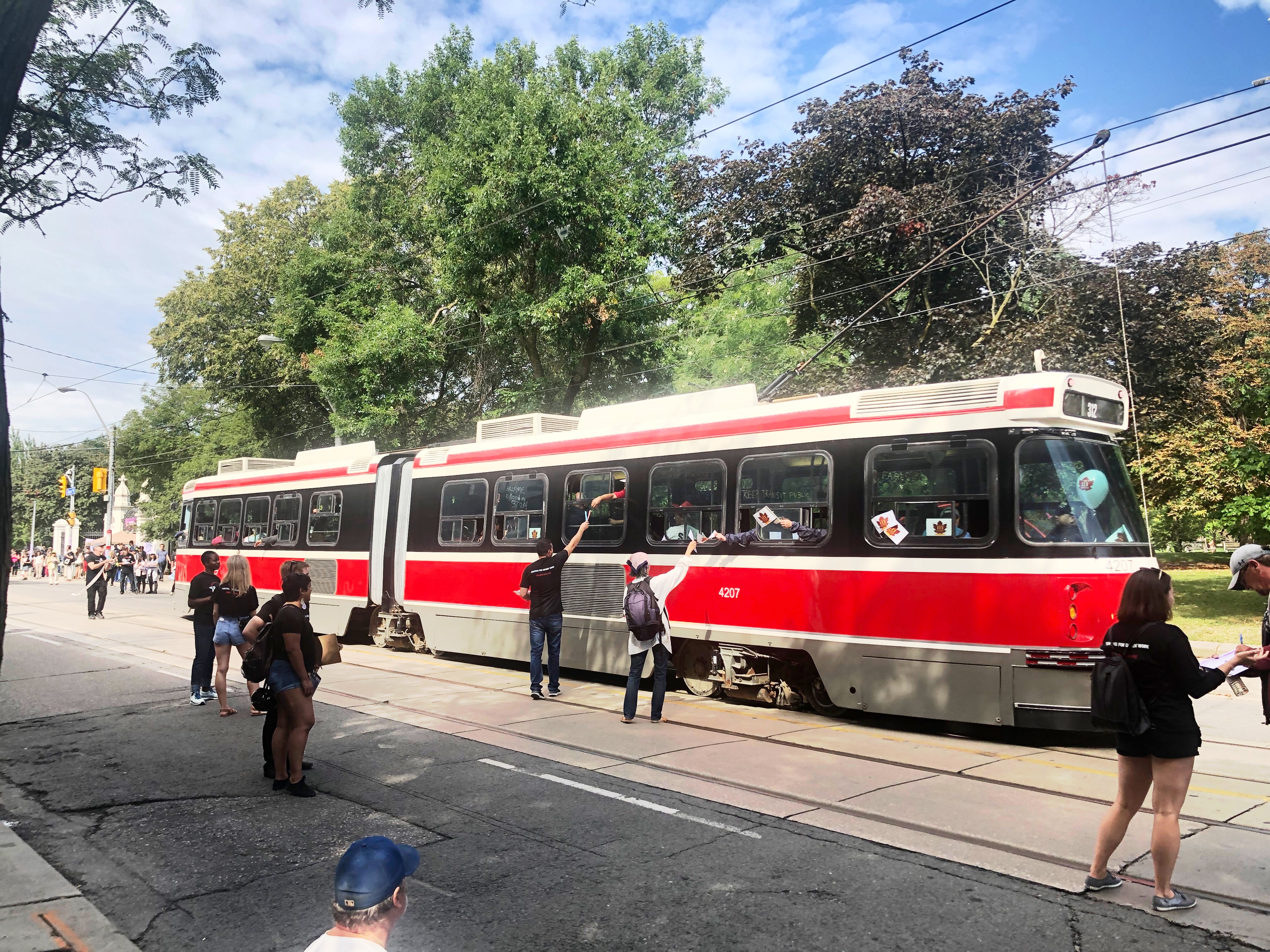
An ALRV on the day of its retirement. The vehicles were retired in September 2019.

On September 2, 2019, the TTC retired the last of its ALRV streetcars. The next day, due to the construction work at the Queen, Kingston Road, Eastern Avenue intersection, the TTC eliminated the 502 Downtowner service indefinitely. Concordantly, the 503 Kingston Rd service, which used to operate during rush hours only, was upgraded to operate during all daytime hours Monday through Friday. This change also affected the 501 Queen service, with buses replacing streetcars east of Queen Street and Greenwood Avenue. The construction projects ended that November. While the 501 Queen resumed full streetcar service, the 502 remained eliminated and the consolidation of Kingston Road service into the 503 Kingston Rd route remained in effect.

On December 29, 2019, the TTC retired the last of its high-floor streetcars, the CLRVs. The final day for the CLRVs included a ceremonial farewell voyage along Queen Street, although the TTC plans to retain two CLRVs in Toronto for special events and charters. Since the retirement of the CLRVs, all TTC surface routes have been served by accessible low-floor vehicles.

On August 15, 2023, the credit and debit card single-ride fare payment option was reintroduced as part of a system-wide TTC rollout. Customers can tap a credit or debit card (including those loaded in a digital wallet) on a TTC Presto fare reader to pay their fares or validate transfers. The customer's tapped-in credit or debit card acts as POP while riding.

=== Incidents ===
On December 16, 2010, the TTC suffered its worst accident since the Russell Hill subway crash in 1995. Up to 17 people were sent to hospital with serious but non-life-threatening injuries after a 505 Dundas streetcar heading eastbound collided with a Greyhound bus at Dundas and River Streets.

== Routes ==
Based on 2013 statistics, the TTC operated 304.6 kilometres (189.3 mi) of routes on 82 kilometres (51 mi) streetcar network (double or single track) throughout Toronto. As of July 28, 2024, there are eleven active daytime streetcar routes plus seven overnight streetcar routes (part of the Blue Night Network) on the TTC network. The following table does not reflect temporary diversions and bus substitutions.

No.	Name	Length	Description
501	Queen	To Humber Loop: 16.9 km (10.5 mi); To Long Branch Loop: 24.6 km (15.3 mi)	Operates between Neville Park Loop and Humber Loop along Queen Street and the Queensway. After 10 p.m., extended to Long Branch Loop, replacing the 507 Long Branch route. Part of the Blue Night Network service, operating as 301 Queen between Neville Park and Long Branch Loops.
503	Kingston Rd	9.8 km (6.1 mi)	Operates along Kingston Road between Bingham Loop and York Street. Part of the Blue Night Network service, operating as 303 Kingston Rd between Bingham Loop and Roncesvalles Avenue.
504	King	504A: 10.4 km (6.5 mi); 504B: 9.6 km (6.0 mi)	Normally operates as two branches overlapping along King Street: 504A Dundas West station to Distillery Loop; 504B Dufferin Gate Loop to Broadview station; The route between King Street East at Sumach Street and Distillery Loop, along Cherry Street, has a dedicated right-of-way. Along King Street, vehicles get priority and cars are diverted after every other block. Part of the Blue Night Network service, operating as 304 King between Dundas West station and Broadview station, bypassing Dufferin Gate and Distillery Loops.
505	Dundas	10.9 km (6.8 mi)	Operates between Dundas West station and Broadview station via Dundas Street. Part of the Blue Night Network service, operating as 305 Dundas.
506	Carlton	15.1 km (9.4 mi)	Operates between Main Street station and High Park Loop servicing Gerrard, Carlton and College Streets. Part of the Blue Night Network, operating as 306 Carlton.
507	Long Branch	7.9 km (4.9 mi)	Operates between Humber Loop and Long Branch Loop along Lake Shore Boulevard. Only streetcar route that operates entirely outside Old Toronto. Replaced by 501 Queen after 10 p.m.
508	Lake Shore	19.0 km (11.8 mi)	Operates between Long Branch Loop and Distillery Loop along Lake Shore Boulevard, the Queensway and King Street. Weekday rush-hour service in peak direction only.
509	Harbourfront	4.4 km (2.7 mi)	Operates on a dedicated right-of-way between Union station and Exhibition Loop
510	Spadina	5.4 km (3.4 mi)	Operates on a dedicated right-of-way between Spadina station and Union station. Part of the Blue Night Network service, operating as 310 Spadina.
511	Bathurst	5.3 km (3.3 mi)	Operates on dedicated transit lanes between Bathurst station and Exhibition Loop with right-of-way along Fleet Street
512	St. Clair	7.1 km (4.4 mi)	Operates on a dedicated right-of-way between St. Clair station and Gunns Loop (west of Keele Street) along St. Clair Avenue. Part of the Blue Night Network, operating as 312 St. Clair.

All streetcar routes are served by low-floor, accessible Flexity Outlook vehicles. When replacement bus service is required (e.g., for construction, special events, or emergencies), replacement buses bear the same route number and name as the corresponding streetcar route.

=== Route numbers ===
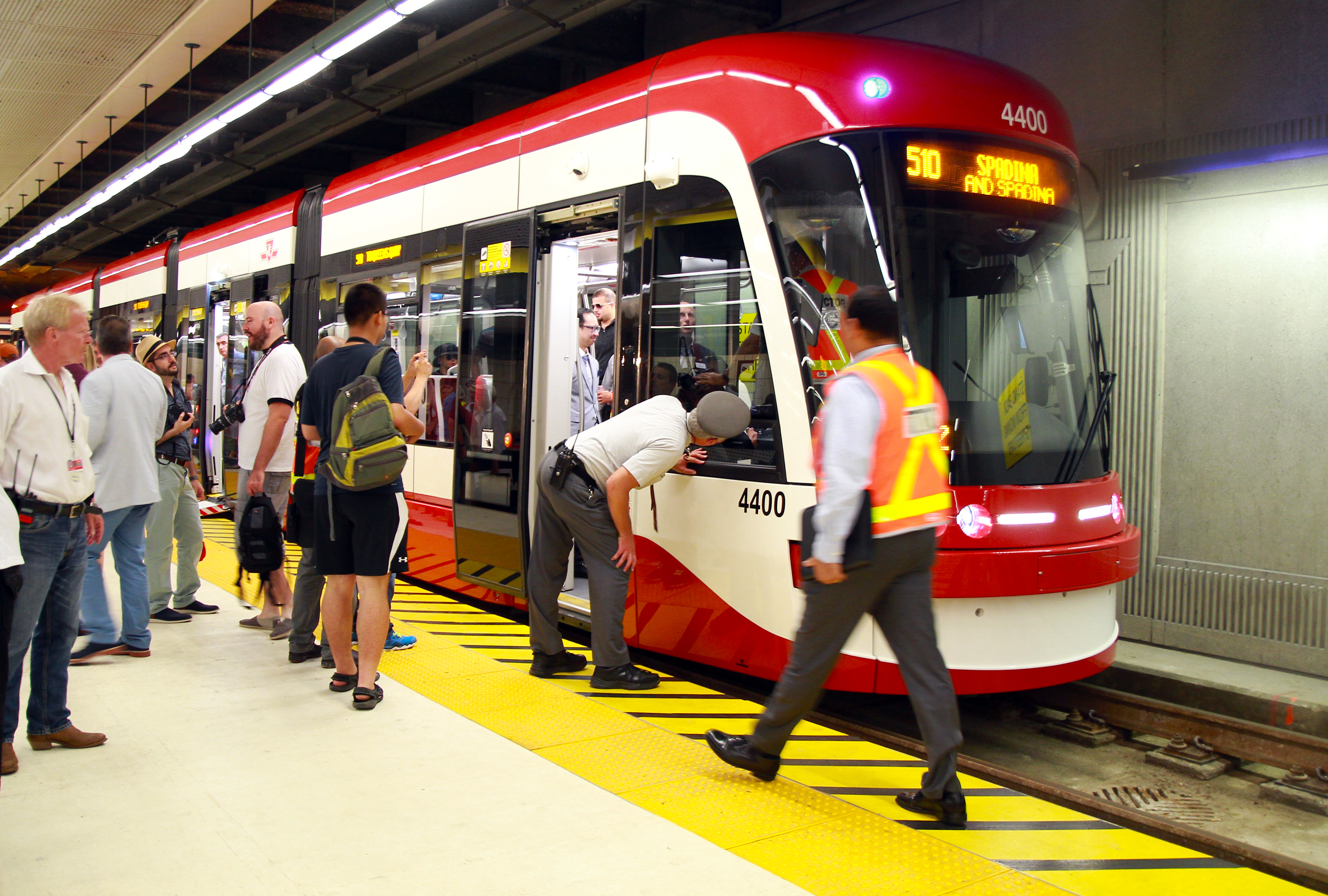
510 Spadina displayed at the front and the side of a TTC Flexity Outlook streetcar

Until 1980, streetcar routes had names but not numbers. When the CLRVs were introduced, the TTC assigned route numbers in the 500 series. CLRVs and later ALRVs had a single front rollsign showing various combinations of route number and destination, while PCC streetcars showed a route identifier (route name until the 1980s and later route number) and destination on two separate front rollsigns. The dot-matrix display destination signs on the Flexity streetcars show route number, route name and destination. Before 2018, streetcar-replacement bus services indicated route number and destination but not route name, like the CLRVs.

The streetcar-operated Blue Night Network routes are assigned 300-series route numbers. The other exception to the 500 series numbering was the Harbourfront LRT streetcar. When introduced in 1990, this route was numbered 604, which was intended to group it with the old (albeit unposted) numbering scheme for Toronto subway routes. In 1996, the TTC overhauled its rapid transit route numbers and stopped trying to market the Harbourfront route as "rapid transit". The number was changed to 510. The tracks were later extended in two directions to form the 510 Spadina and 509 Harbourfront routes.

=== Subway connections ===
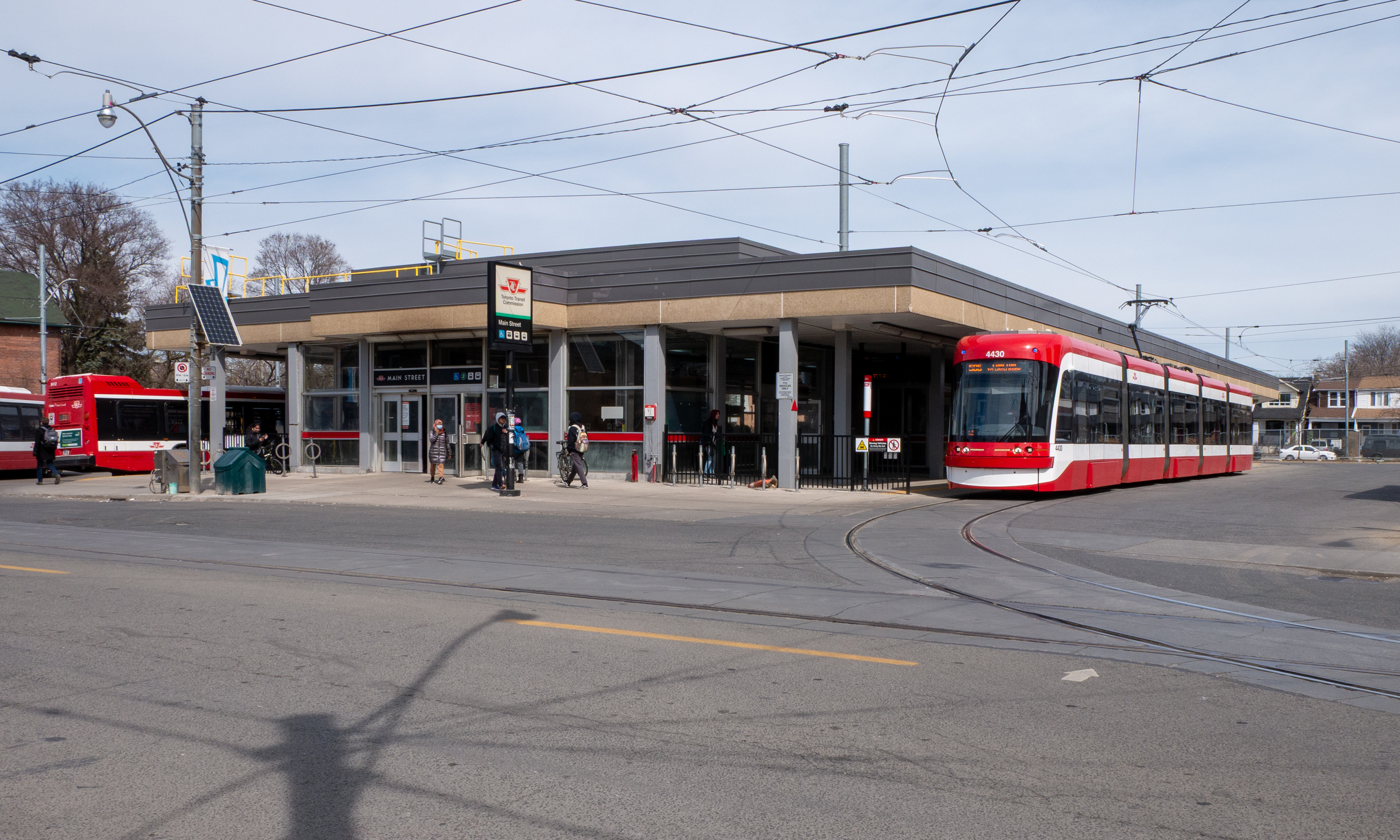
A Flexity Outlook streetcar at Main Street station's streetcar connection. Several Toronto subway stations provide connections to streetcars.

There are underground connections between streetcars and the subway at St. Clair West, Spadina, and Union stations, and streetcars enter St. Clair, Dundas West, Bathurst, Broadview, and Main Street stations at street level. At the eight downtown stations, excepting Union, from Queen's Park to College on Line 1 Yonge–University inclusive, streetcars stop on the street outside the station entrances. Union station serves as the hub for both the TTC and the GO Transit systems.

=== Dedicated rights-of-way and transit malls ===
The majority of streetcar routes in Toronto operate in mixed traffic, generally reflecting the original track configurations of the streetcar system, a system that dates back to the late 19th and early 20th centuries. However, newer trackage has largely been established within dedicated rights-of-way to allow streetcars to operate with fewer disruptions due to delays caused by automobile traffic. Most of the system's dedicated rights-of-way operate within the median of existing streets, separated from general traffic by raised curbs and controlled by specialized traffic signals at intersections. Queen streetcars have operated on such a right-of-way along the Queensway between Humber and Sunnyside loops since 1957. Since the 1990s, dedicated rights-of-way have been opened downtown along Queens Quay, Spadina Avenue, and Fleet Street, as well as St. Clair Avenue West, which is north of downtown.

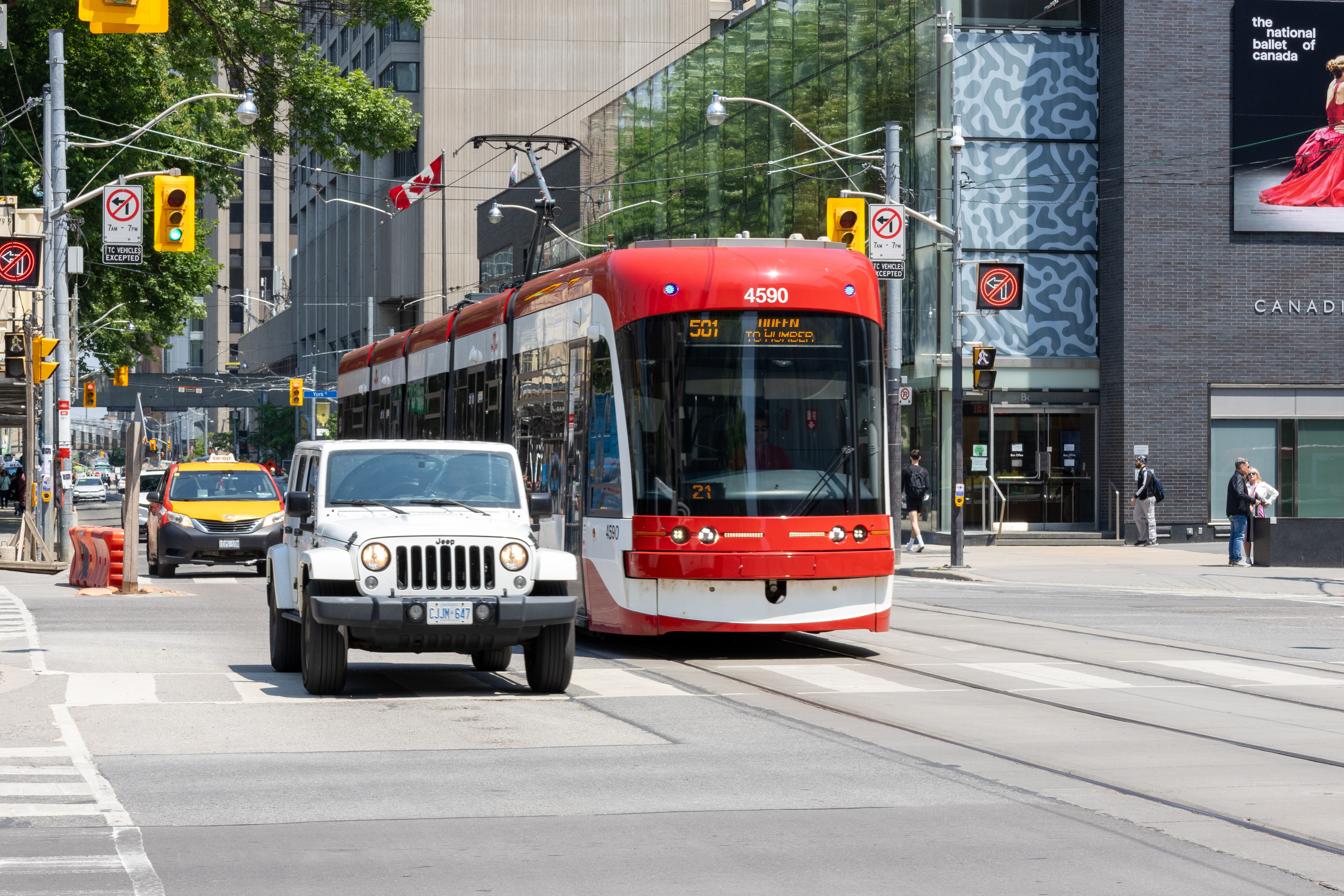
A 501 Queen streetcar operating in mixed traffic. Most streetcar routes in Toronto operate in mixed traffic, reflecting the original configurations of the system.

Short sections of the track also operate in a tunnel (to connect with Spadina, Union, and St. Clair West subway stations). The most significant section of underground streetcar trackage is a tunnel underneath Bay Street connecting Queens Quay with Union station; this section, which is approximately 700 m (2,300 ft) long, includes one intermediate underground station at Bay Street and Queens Quay.

During the late 2000s, the TTC reinstated a separated right-of-way, which had been removed between 1928 and 1935, on St. Clair Avenue for the entire 512 St. Clair route. A court decision obtained by local merchants in October 2005 had brought construction to a halt and put the project in doubt; the judicial panel then recused themselves, and the delay for a new decision adversely affected the construction schedule. A new judicial panel decided in February 2006 in favour of the city and construction resumed in mid-2006. One-third of the St. Clair right-of-way was completed by the end of 2006 and streetcars began using it on February 18, 2007. The portion finished was from St. Clair station (Yonge Street) to Vaughan Road. The second phase started construction in mid-2007 from Dufferin Street to Caledonia Road. Service resumed using the second and third phases on December 20, 2009, extending streetcar service from St. Clair to Earlscourt Loop located just south and west of Lansdowne Avenue. The fourth and final phase from Earlscourt Loop to Gunns Loop (just west of Keele Street) is completed and full streetcar service over the entire route was finally restored on June 30, 2010.

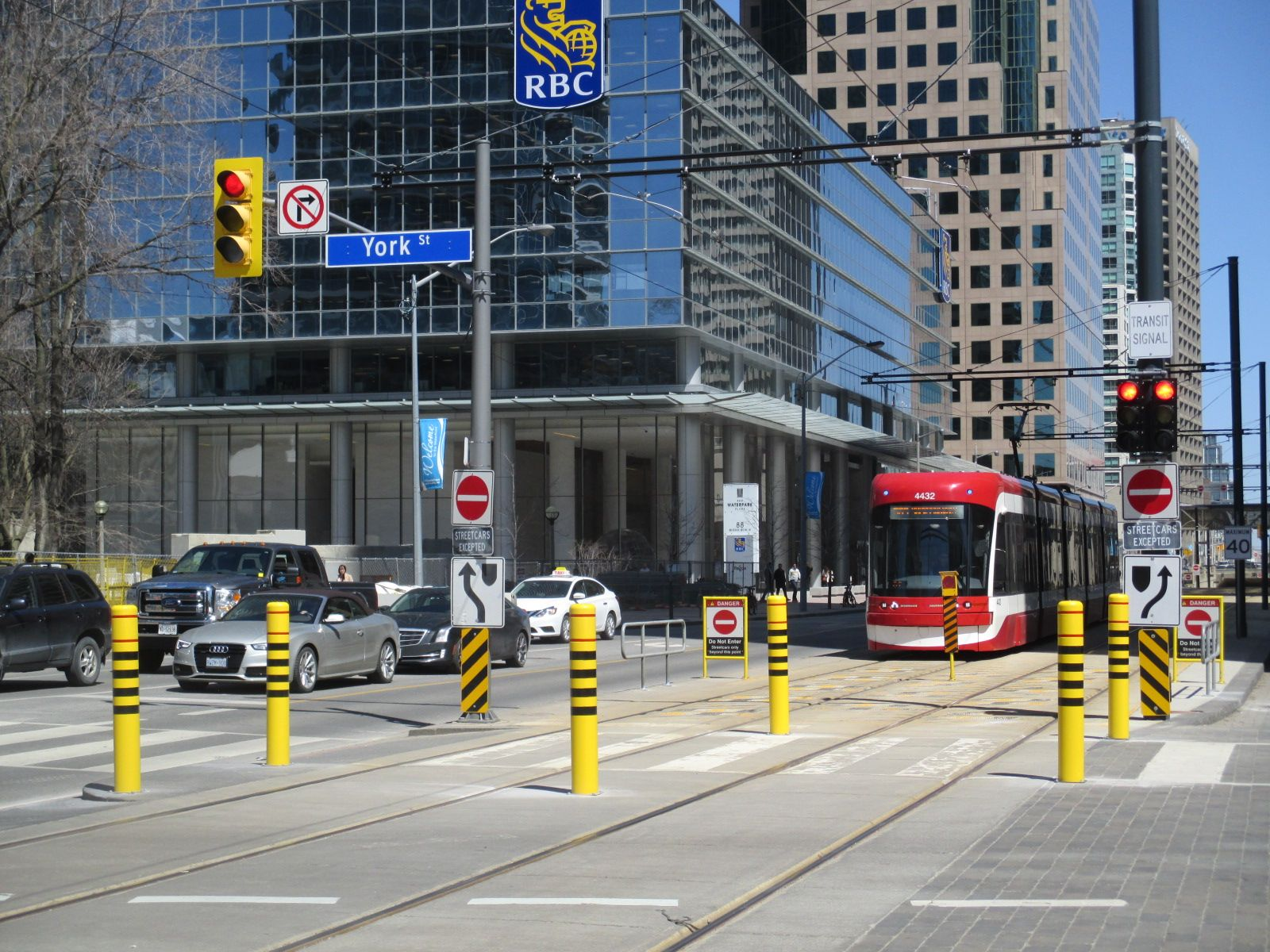
Route 509 Harbourfront features dedicated lanes.

Between September 2007 and March 2008, the tracks on Fleet Street between Bathurst Street and the Exhibition Loop were converted to a dedicated right-of-way and opened for the 511 Bathurst and the 509 Harbourfront streetcars. Streetcar track and overhead power line were also installed at the Fleet loop, which is located at the Queen's Wharf Lighthouse.

The eastern portion of the 504A King route runs on a side-of-street right-of-way. It was constructed starting in 2012 to support redevelopment in the West Don Lands and the Distillery District, former industrial areas.

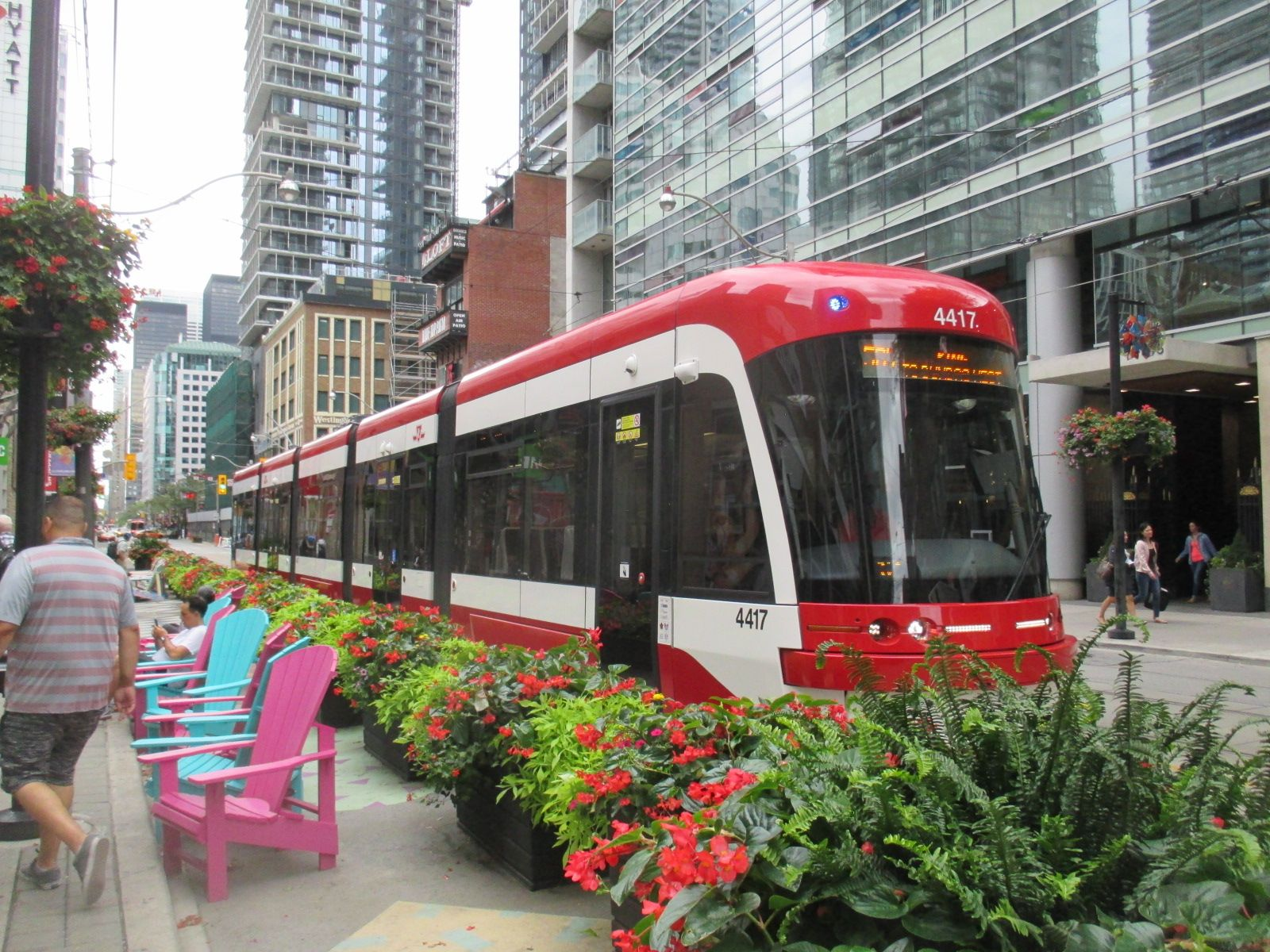
Streetcar operating on the King Street Transit Priority Corridor

As part of the King Street Pilot Project, a temporary transit mall was set up along King Street for a one-year trial period starting in mid-November 2017. This project was then made permanent under the name King Street Transit Priority Corridor. The transit mall prevents road traffic from impeding streetcar service as road traffic typically leaves the mall via a right turn at most signalized intersections.

In November 2025, work began on the 511 Bathurst route to paint dedicated transit lanes along the streetcar tracks to allow for streetcars and emergency vehicles to bypass car traffic, in preparation for the 2026 FIFA World Cup matches held at BMO Field. Work concluded by May 2026.

=== Planned expansion ===
As of 2022, the City of Toronto and the TTC were planning the Waterfront East LRT to run along Queens Quay East from Union station to the Port Lands, to complement the 509 Harbourfront line.

In 2019, the TTC was considering changes to several streetcar routes. As of 2022, these ideas had not been implemented. The changes considered were:

- Splitting 501 Queen into two overlapping branches: 501A from Neville Park Loop to Sunnyside Loop, and 501B from Long Branch Loop to a new Riverside Loop, to be constructed along Broadview Avenue just north of Queen Street East
- Extending 504B west to Humber Loop and later to a proposed Park Lawn Loop
- Extending 503 Kingston Road west to Dufferin Gate Loop

The city proposed the Waterfront West LRT, a streetcar route that would run from Long Branch Loop along Lake Shore Boulevard and the Queensway to Colbourne Lodge Drive and then adjacent to Lake Shore Boulevard via Dufferin Gate Loop to Exhibition Loop and into Union Station via Queens Quay. New track on a private right-of-way would be required between Colbourne Lodge Drive and Exhibition Loop. In 2019, the city approved new track linking Dufferin Gate and Exhibition Loops; however, as of 2022, no construction has started.

=== Light rail lines ===
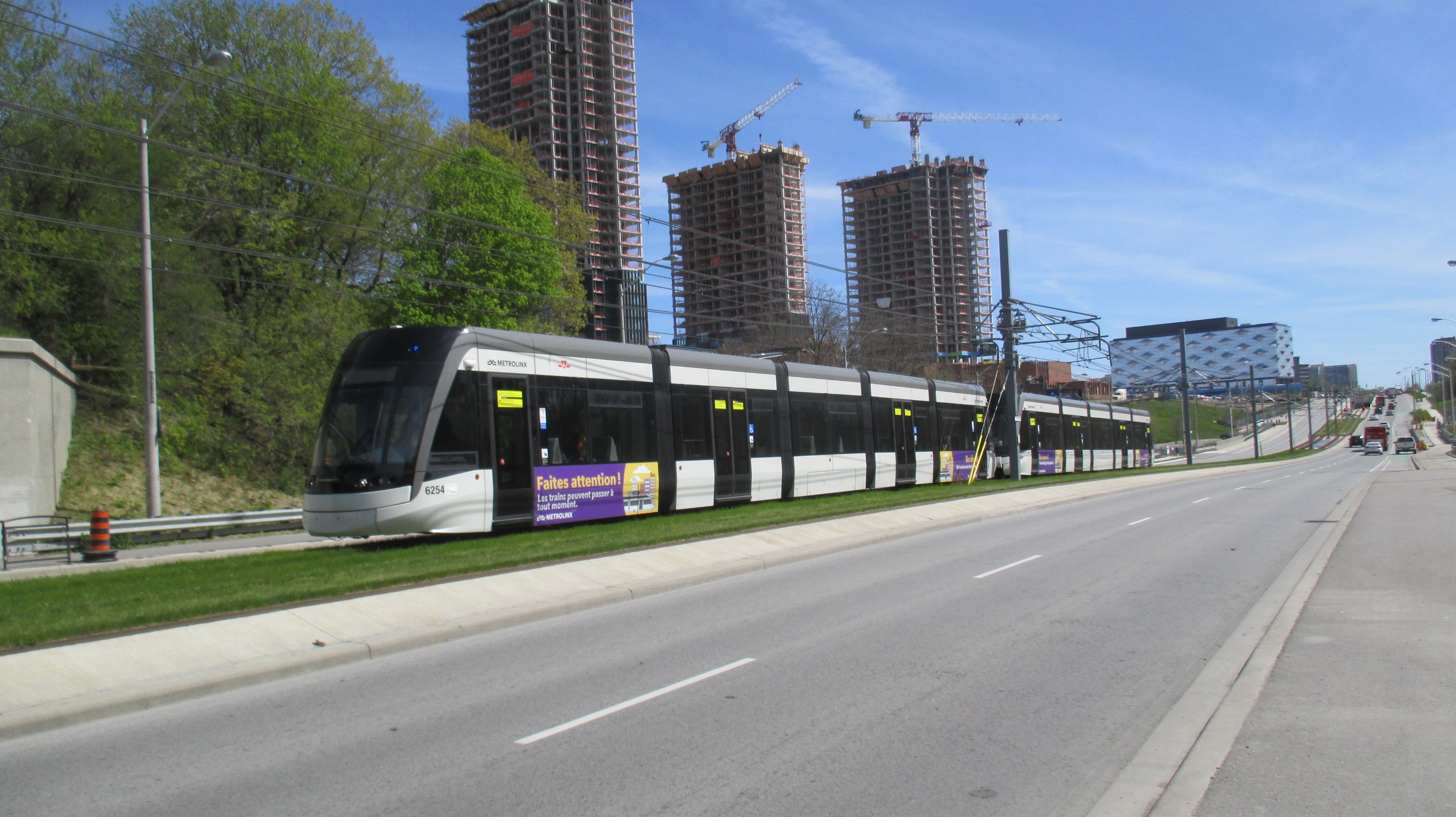
Line 5 Eglinton Flexity Freedom light rail train

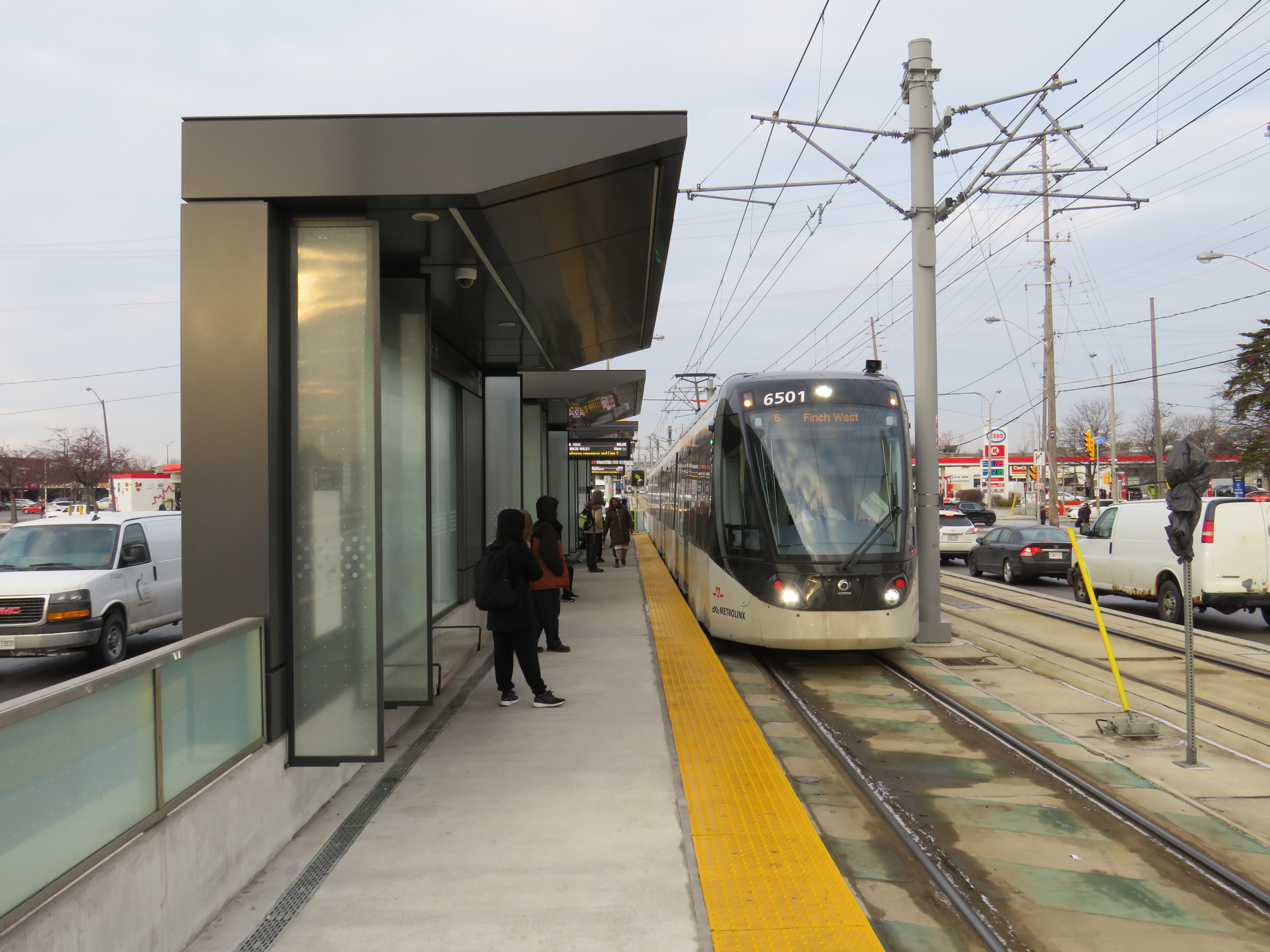
Line 6 Finch West Citadis Spirit light rail vehicle

There are two light rail transit (LRT) lines in Toronto that are not part of the streetcar system. They are Line 5 Eglinton, which opened in February 2026, and Line 6 Finch West, which opened in December 2025. Light rail vehicles are double-ended to reverse at crossovers (instead of looping as streetcars do), are operated singly or in two-unit trains, and run on standard gauge track rather than the streetcar system's broad gauge. Both lines are considered part of the subway system and are numbered as such.

The LRT lines also use different rolling stock. Line 5 uses Bombardier's Flexity Freedom, while Line 6 uses the Citadis Spirit, which is manufactured by Alstom.

=== Discontinued streetcar routes ===
Between late 1921 and 1923, the TTC connected and merged many of the routes it inherited from the Toronto Railway Company and the Toronto Civic Railways. On July 1, 1923, the TTC did a major reorganization of routes whereby 9 new routes were created, 6 routes were discontinued, 13 were modified and 8 routes remained unmodified. The following list shows only those routes discontinued after this reorganization.

Route	Began	Ended	Number	Notes
Ashbridge	1917	1924		Former TRC route, replaced by buses after a bridge carrying the streetcar line was declared unsafe
Bay	1923	1954		Replaced by extended Dupont streetcar
Beach	1923	1948		Route served today by 501 Queen
Bloor	1890	1966		Joined former TRC and TCR routes; used multiple unit PCC trains from 1950; replaced by Line 2 Bloor–Danforth subway.
Bloor West	1914	1925		Former TCR route absorbed into the Bloor streetcar line
Bloor shuttle	1966	1968		Western end of the Bloor streetcar line replaced an extension of the Bloor–Danforth subway
Cherry	2016	2018	514	Route cancelled on October 7, 2018, and replaced by branches of 504 King
Church	1881	1954		Former TRC route, replaced by Church bus running until 1979
College	1923	1933		Replaced by the Carlton streetcar route
Coxwell	1921	1966		Replaced by 22 Coxwell bus
Danforth shuttle	1966	1968		Eastern end of the Bloor streetcar line replaced an extension of the Bloor–Danforth subway
Danforth tripper	1923	1966		Rush-hour variant of the Bloor streetcar route
Davenport	1892	1940		Former Toronto Suburban Railway route, replaced by Davenport bus due to low ridership
Dovercourt	1888	1947		Former TRC route replaced by trolley buses due to declining ridership and to avoid replacing deteriorated track
Downtowner	1973	2019	502	Merged with 503 Kingston Rd in September 2019 and delisted on TTC website by January 2020
Dundas Exhibition	1980	1986	522	Seasonal route also operated during the 1995 Canadian National Exhibition season and the 2013 season
Dupont	1923	1963		Replaced by 6 Bay bus
Earlscourt	1954	1976		Merged into 512 St. Clair; assigned number 512L
Fort	1931	1966		Merged into 511 Bathurst
Harbord	1911	1966		Replaced by 72 Pape and 94 Wellesley buses
Harbourfront	1990	2000	604	Renumbered as 509 Harbourfront
King Exhibition	1980	2000	521	Temporarily reinstated in 2013 and operated as 521 Exhibition East
Lake Simcoe	1927	1930		Former T&Y Radial Metropolitan line
Lambton	1924	1928		Former Toronto Suburban Railway route, replaced by buses
Lansdowne	1917	1947		Former TCR line extended south by TTC, replaced by trolley buses
Mimico	1927	1928		Former T&Y Radial Mimico line replaced by Beach streetcar route and Port Credit route
North Yonge	1930	1948		From Glen Echo to Richmond Hill
Oakwood	1922	1960		Replaced by 63 Ossington trolleycoach (converted to diesel bus route in 1992 when the trolley bus fleet was retired)
Parliament	1910	1966		Replaced by 65 Parliament bus
Port Credit	1928	1935		Shortened Mimico route running west of Long Branch Loop, replaced by buses
Scarboro	1928	1936		Former T&Y Radial Scarboro line replaced by buses
Spadina	1923	1948		Replaced by the 77 Spadina bus; later replaced by the 510 Spadina streetcar in 1997
Mount Pleasant	1975	1976		Split from 512 St. Clair; replaced by 74 Mt. Pleasant trolleycoach until 1991; diesel bus route from St. Clair station to Mt. Pleasant Loop just north of Eglinton 1976–1977; diesel bus route since 1991.
Rogers Road	1922	1974		Replaced by 63F Ossington via Rogers trolleycoach and 48 Humber Blvd from 1974 to 1994; diesel buses from 1992 onwards. In 1994, 161 Rogers Road service replaced both 63F Ossington and 48 Humber Blvd.
Sherbourne	1874	1942		Former TRC route replaced by buses
Weston	1923	1948		Former Toronto Suburban Railway route, replaced by trolley buses
Winchester	1910	1924		Replaced by Yonge and Parliament streetcars (former replaced by subway in 1954 and latter by bus route in 1966); bus route from Parliament Street east to Sumach Street from 1924 to 1930.
Yonge	1861	1954		Replaced by Line 1 Yonge–University subway, Downtown bus (97 Yonge beginning in 1956), and Yonge trolleycoach until 1973, when it was replaced with diesel buses.

Note that diesel buses also include the later diesel-electric hybrid, battery-electric and gasoline buses.

== Rolling stock ==
=== Streetcars acquired by the TTC ===
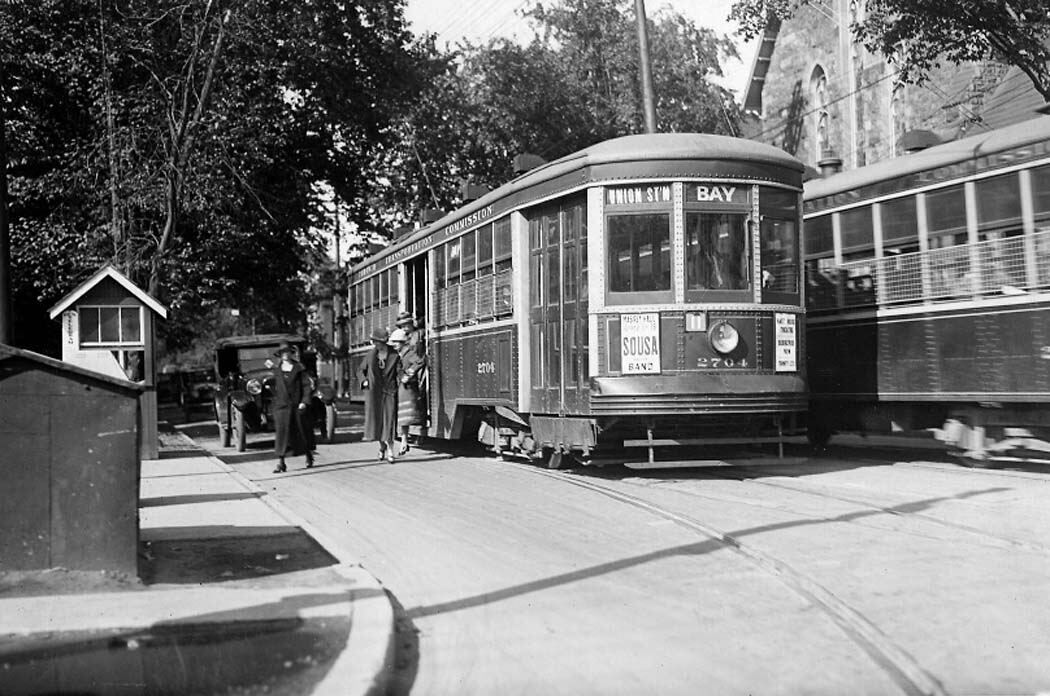
Peter Witt streetcars operated by the TTC, 1925. The Witt streetcar was ordered by the TTC in the early 1920s.

When the TTC was created in 1921, it acquired hundreds of cars from its two predecessor companies: the Toronto Railway Company and the Toronto Civic Railways. In 1927, the TTC acquired the radial cars of the former Toronto & York Radial Railway when it took over operation of that system from the Hydro-Electric Railways.

In the 1920s, the TTC purchased new Peter Witt streetcars, and they remained in use into the 1960s. In 1938, the TTC started to operate its first Presidents' Conference Cars (PCC), eventually operating more than any other city in North America. In 1979, the Canadian Light Rail Vehicles (CLRV) entered revenue service, followed by their longer, articulated variants, the Articulated Light Rail Vehicle (ALRV), in 1988. The last of the PCC vehicles were retired from full-time revenue service in 1995.

On August 31, 2014, the TTC started operating its first Bombardier Flexity Outlook vehicles. These low-floor streetcars are accessible, making the streetcar network accessible for the first time. The last of the older ALRV vehicles were retired from regular service in September 2019, followed by the CLRVs in December of that same year.

The following table summarizes streetcars purchased by the TTC since 1921. The main article has more details on rosters, including streetcars inherited from the Toronto Railway Company and the Toronto Civic Railways, which are not summarized here.

Type	Quantity	In service	Notes
Peter Witt	250	1921–1954	"Large" Witts – with rear coupler to haul a trailer.
Peter Witt	100	1922–1965	"Small" Witts – without coupler; one heritage vehicle, 2766, retained by the TTC for special occasions.
2-door trailer	60	1921–1938	
3-door trailer	165	1923–1954	"Harvey" trailers
PCC	317	1938–1971	Air-electric; acquired from other transit agencies. Entered service on September 23, 1938. Retired from service on March 28, 1972.
PCC	428	1947–1995	All-electric; two PCCs retained by the TTC for charters and special occasions. Retired from service on December 8, 1995.
CLRV	196	1979–2019	Entered service on September 30, 1979. Retired from regular TTC service on December 29, 2019. Three heritage vehicles were retained by the TTC for special occasions, and a number of vehicles were also bought by heritage museums.
ALRV	52	1988–2019	Articulated, two-section streetcars; entered service on January 19, 1988. Last ran in revenue service on January 19, 2019, and were pulled from service due to icy weather. briefly returned to service on May 14, 2019 but vanished from service two days after returning. All ALRVs were officially retired on September 2, 2019. Car #4204 was retained by the TTC for special occasions and another sold to the Halton County Radial Railway on October 22, 2019.
Flexity Outlook	264	2014–present	Articulated, with five modules per vehicle, low-floor and wheelchair-accessible. Entered service on August 31, 2014.

=== Streetcar shortage (2016–2020) ===
From 2016 to 2020, the TTC faced a streetcar shortage because of:

- Delays in the delivery of the new Flexity Outlook streetcars
- The declining reliability and retirement of the aging CLRV/ALRV fleet
- A 20 percent increase in streetcar ridership since 2008
- Warranty repairs on 67 Flexity streetcars requiring the shipment of several streetcars at a time to a Bombardier plant

In January 2017, the TTC claimed that delays in delivery of the new Flexity streetcars had resulted in both streetcar and bus shortages. Because the CLRV/ALRV streetcars required extra maintenance, only 170 of the 200 CLRVs and ALRVs could be put into service. This shortage led to the replacement of streetcars by buses on some routes, which in turn led to a reduction of service on some bus routes.

To address the streetcar shortage, as well as construction projects, the TTC used bus substitution at various times on several streetcar routes. The first bus substitution due to the streetcar shortage occurred on the 502 Downtowner route on October 11, 2016.

Ridership on the 504 King increased by 25 percent after the implementation of the King Street Transit Priority Corridor through downtown King Street. Thus, in February 2018, the TTC replaced the CLRV streetcars on routes 505 Dundas and 506 Carlton with buses and reassigned those streetcars to other routes, such as 504 King and 511 Bathurst, to handle crowding from increased ridership.

The streetcar fleet capacity had not grown for almost three decades after the CLRVs and ALRVs were introduced. After delivery of the last of the initial 204 Flexity cars ordered, the TTC planned to purchase another 60 cars; however, the TTC estimated that would only satisfy demand until 2023 instead of 2027 as originally planned. Bombardier was the expected supplier for additional streetcars because, if the TTC chose another supplier, a prototype modified for Toronto's track characteristics would not be ready until 2023, with first delivery in 2024 or 2025.

By June 2020, the streetcar shortage had been alleviated by the reduction in ridership due to the COVID-19 pandemic in conjunction with temporary bus replacements on routes 511 Bathurst and 506 Carlton to accommodate construction projects. With more streetcars available, the TTC could ship up 19 extra streetcars to a Bombardier plant for warranty repairs, as well as introduce Flexity streetcars for the first time on route 503 Kingston Rd.

On October 22, 2020, the TTC board approved the immediate purchase of 13 additional streetcars from Bombardier for delivery in 2023, with an option for 47 more cars, if funding from senior levels of government became available. Since the existing carhouses can only hold 239 streetcars, the TTC recommended setting up a carhouse at the Hillcrest Complex to hold 25 streetcars. The 264th and final new streetcar was delivered in mid-November 2025.

== Infrastructure ==
=== Track characteristics ===
The track on the Toronto streetcar system has characteristics of non-standard gauge, tight curve radii and single-point switches that previous generations of high-floor streetcars were adept at handling. Some of these characteristics were problematic for Bombardier when it adapted its low-floor Flexity Outlook for Toronto's streetcar system.

==== Track gauge ====
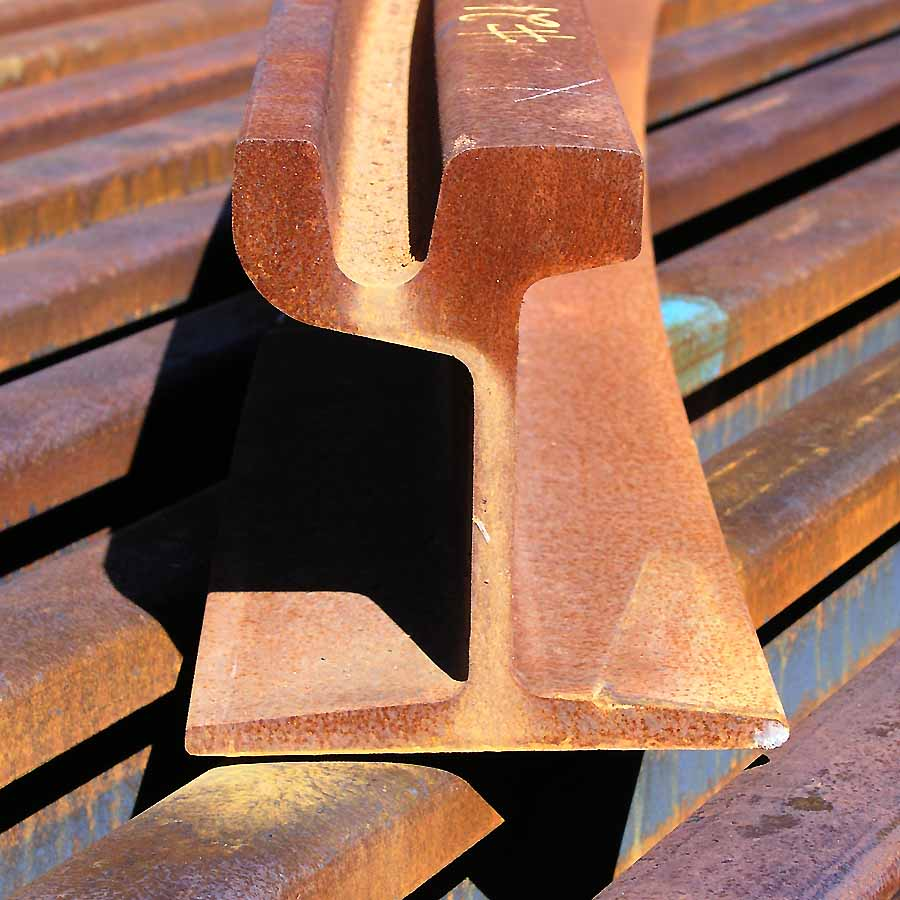
A flange rail, which is typical of Toronto streetcar lines

All streetcar lines use the unique Toronto gauge of 4 ft 10 7/8 in (1,495 mm) which is 2 3/8 inches (60 mm) wider than the 4 ft 8 1/2 in (1,435 mm) standard gauge used by most other rail lines in Canada. This broad gauge was adopted in 1861 for the city's horse-drawn streetcar lines to allow horse-drawn wagons and carriages to use the inside of the rail for a smoother ride through muddy, unpaved streets. The gauge also had the effect of precluding the movement of standard-gauge freight cars along streetcar lines. The unique gauge has remained to this day because it is easier to adapt new rail vehicles to this gauge than to convert the entire system to standard gauge. The three heavy-rail lines of the Toronto subway also use the unique gauge; however, the former light-metro Line 3 Scarborough and two light rail lines (Line 5 Eglinton and Line 6 Finch West) use standard gauge.

==== Track curvature ====
Curved track on the streetcar system has a very short minimum radius of curvature, with streetcars designed for a minimum radius of 10.973 metres (36 ft). The tightest curves are 11.3 metres (37.1 ft) at Roncesvalles Carhouse and Russell Carhouse. Almost all turning loops on the system have curves of less than 15 metres (49.2 ft).

Toronto's Flexity Outlook vehicles are designed for a minimum radius of 10.973 metres (36 ft). In contrast, the standard Bombardier Flexity Outlook, as well as the Flexity Freedom (used on Line 5 Eglinton), both require a minimum radius of 25 metres (82 ft).

==== Track switches ====
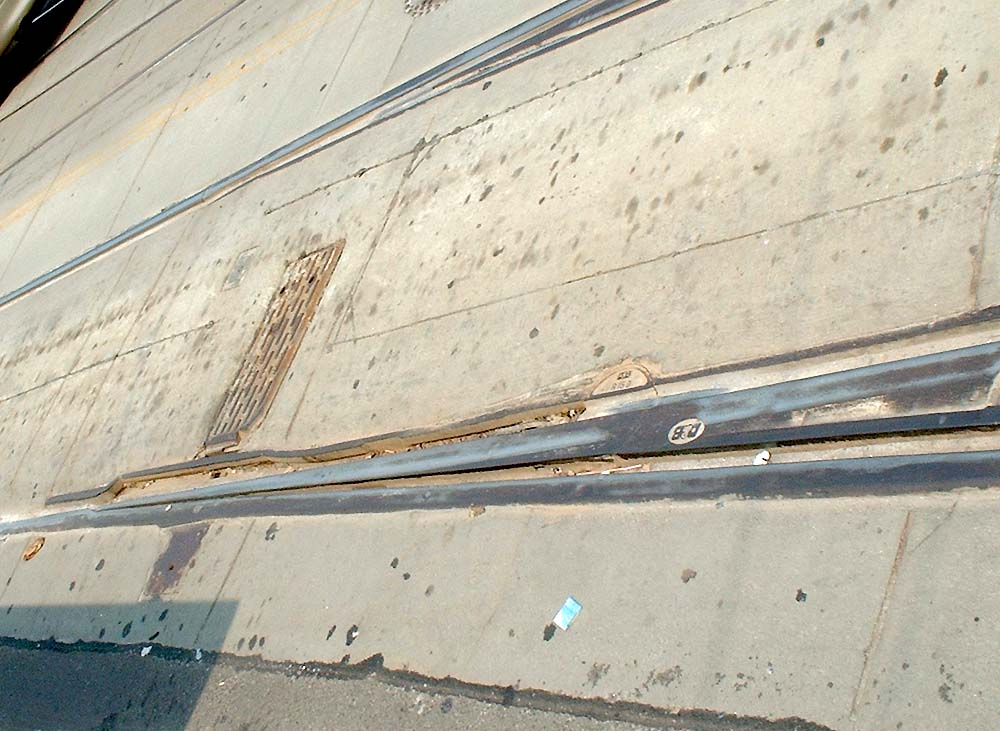
A single-point switch on Spadina Avenue

As with most legacy streetcar systems in North America, the TTC uses single-point switches in special work throughout the system. In contrast, most light-rail systems use double-point switches, with a movable blade on each track. With single-point switches, the blade is only on the inner rail of the curve, and streetcars must have a rigid, continuous axle to pull the wheel on the outer rail through the curve without the blade. Thus, low-floor streetcars with split axles cannot operate through single-point switches. In the early days of the CLRV, Bochum wheels with rubber rings holding the axle caused derailments due to a lack of rigidity, and had to be replaced with SAB wheels.

Streetcar switches are either manual or automatic. For automatic switches, there are loop antennas buried in the road and two transmitters onboard the vehicles. One transmitter is located at the front of the car to set and lock the switch; the second is at the rear to unlock the switch. (Note: This explanation is from several years prior to the delivery of the first Flexity Outlook streetcar.) Because of failing electronics, defective antennas, or the failure of the system to unlock after passage of a car, there is the risk of a streetcar taking the wrong path at a switch.

In 2002, the TTC instituted a "stop, check, go" rule for all facing point switches. Streetcar operators, when approaching such switches, must stop and check the switch-blade setting before proceeding. In 2008, an operator forgot to make this check, which resulted in two streetcars colliding. About 2015, the TTC modified the "stop, check, go" process to include pointing a finger. Each streetcar operator, upon arriving at a facing switch-point, is to stop short of the switch, point with their finger toward the switch's position to confirm that the switch is aligned properly for the streetcar's intended movement, and then proceed.

=== Loops ===
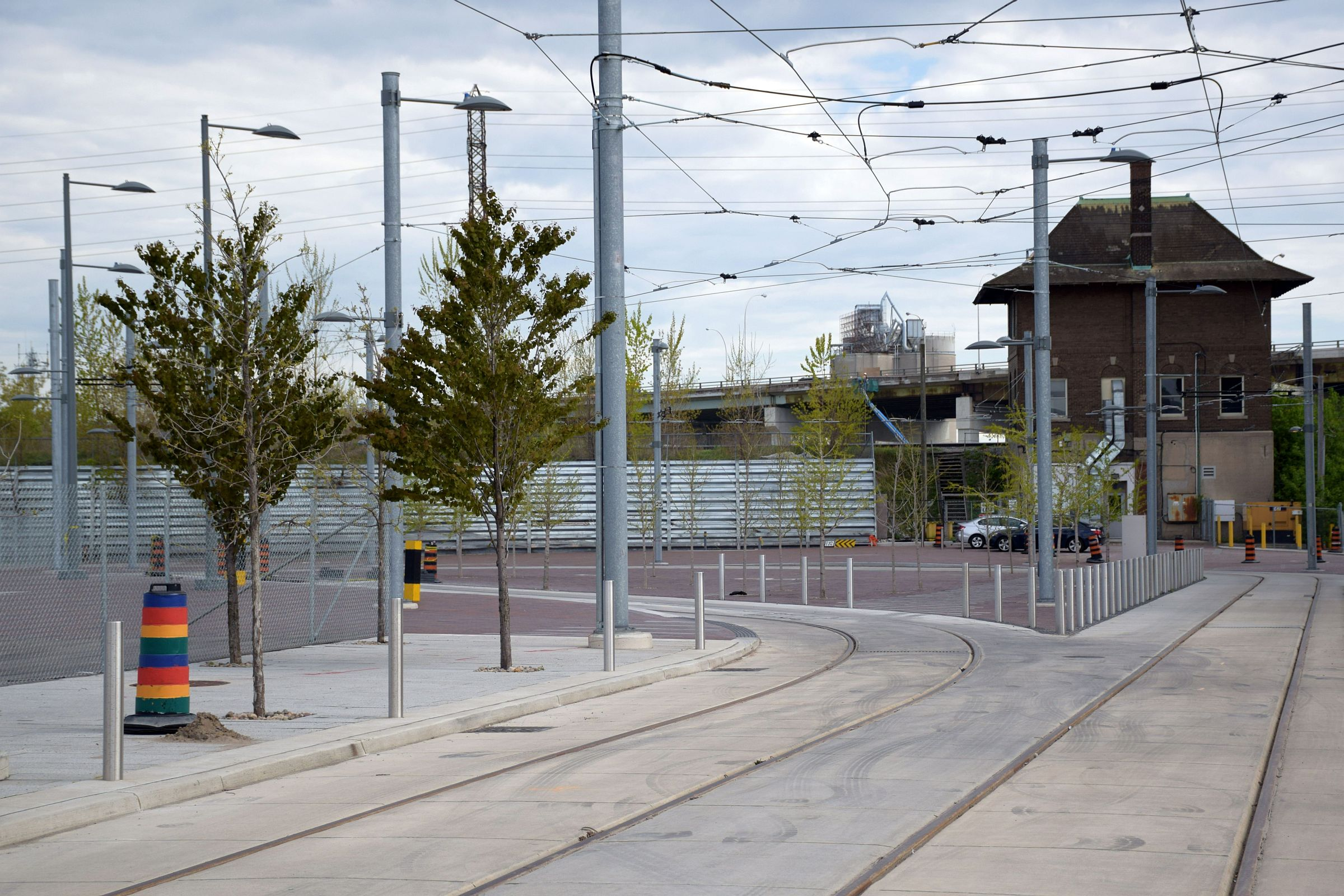
A turning loop near the Distillery District

Since all of Toronto's current streetcars are single-ended, turning loops are provided at the normal endpoints of each route and at likely intermediate turnback locations. A routing on-street around one or more city blocks may serve as a loop, but most loops on the system are wholly or partly off-street. Many of these are also interchange points with subway or bus services.

=== Grand unions ===
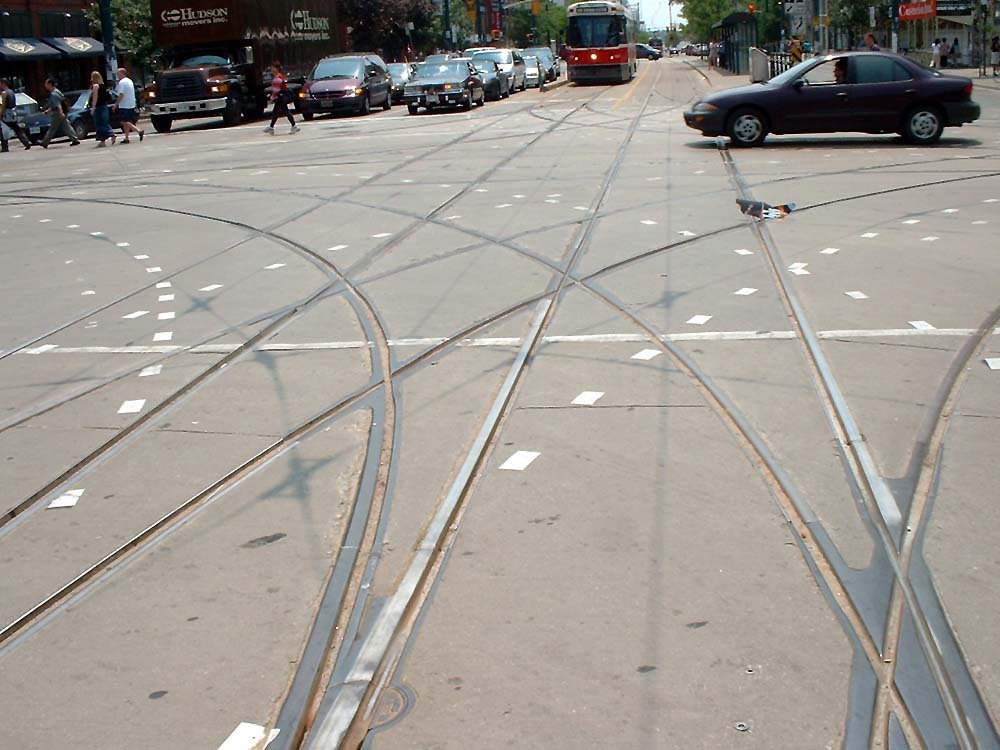
Toronto has three grand unions, such as this one at Spadina Avenue and Queen Street West.

The Toronto streetcar system has three grand unions where a streetcar approaching from any direction at a double-track streetcar junction can turn left or right or pass straight through. As of 2012, Toronto is the only city in North America to retain full grand unions; other North American cities may have partial unions. The three full grand unions in Toronto are at:

- Spadina Avenue and Queen Street West
- Spadina Avenue and King Street West
- Bathurst Street and King Street West

There is also one 7/8 union at King Street West and Dufferin Street missing only the south-to-west curve. There are seven unions that are two curves short of a grand union. They are from east to west:

- Parliament Street and Dundas Street East
- Parliament Street and Queen Street East
- Church Street and Dundas Street East
- Queen Street West and Victoria Street
- Spadina Avenue and College Street
- Bathurst Street and Dundas Street West
- King Street West, Queen Street West, the Queensway and Roncesvalles Avenue

Grand unions need to be replaced as their tracks wear out. The TTC requires two years of planning and preparation to replace a grand union. Once replaced, the tracks at the grand union are expected to last 20 to 25 years before needing replacement again.

=== Non-revenue streetcar tracks ===
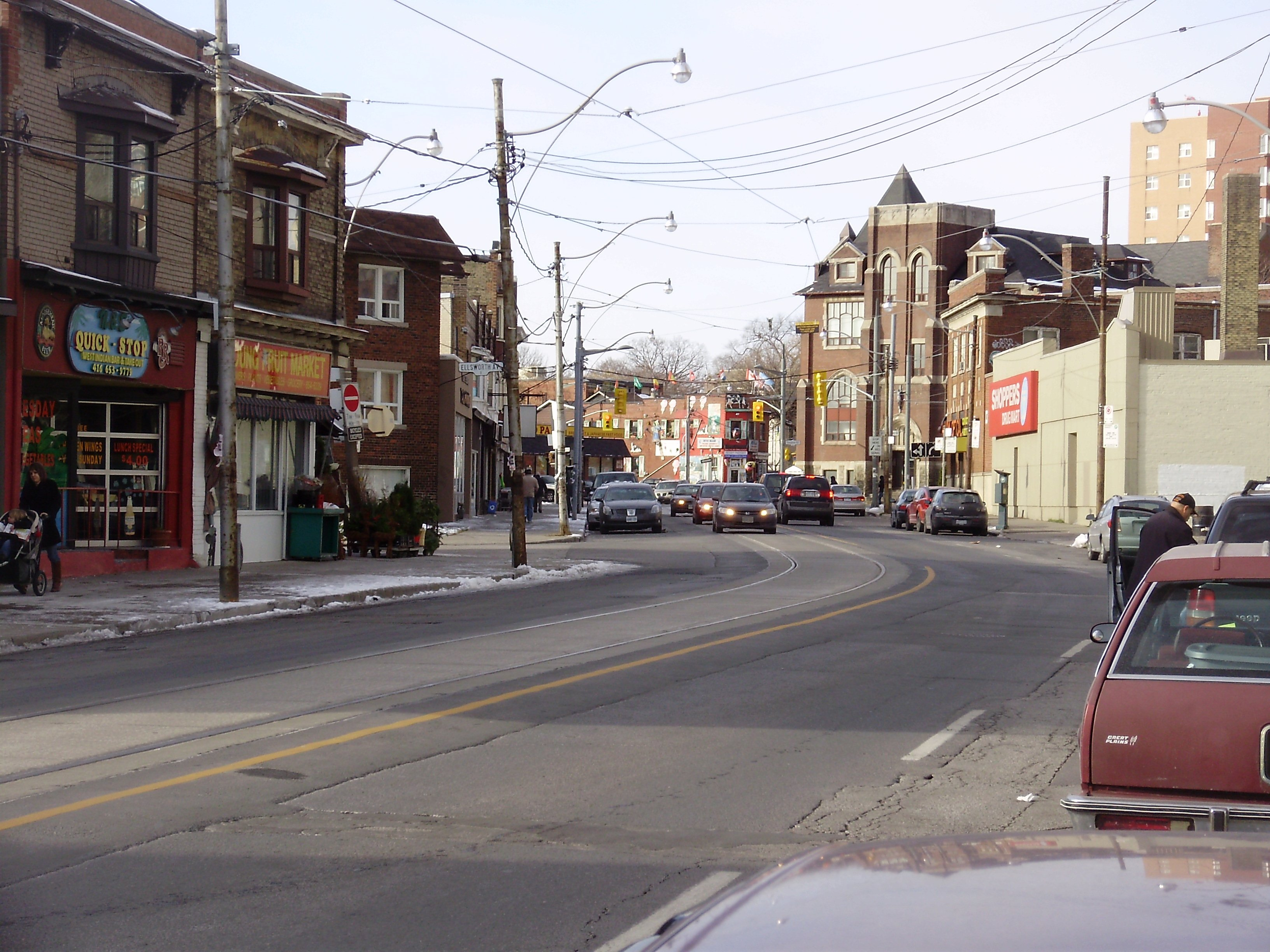
Non-revenue tracks on Vaughan Road in 2008

The streetcar system has non-revenue tracks that interconnect revenue routes and provide alternate routes for planned and emergency diversions. Some non-revenue tracks are necessary for streetcars going in and out of service. Most non-revenue tracks are located in downtown Toronto; they include, roughly from east to west:

- Leslie Street between Queen Street East and the Leslie Barns: This connects a carhouse to the streetcar system.
- Coxwell Avenue between lower Gerrard Street East and Queen Street East
- Parliament Street between Gerrard Street East and King Street East
- Church Street between Carlton Street and King Street East
- Victoria Street between Dundas Street East and Adelaide Street East
- Richmond Street East from Church Street to York Street (westbound only)
- Adelaide Street East between Charlotte and Church Streets (eastbound only)
- York Street from King Street West to Queen Street West (northbound only)
- Bay Street between College Street and Dundas Street West
- McCaul Street between Queen Street East and College Street
- Bathurst Street between Bathurst station and St. Clair Avenue West (segment between Vaughan Road and St. Clair Avenue West is northbound only): This connects the otherwise isolated 512 St. Clair streetcar line and the Hillcrest Complex to the rest of the streetcar system.
  - Vaughan Road south of St. Clair Avenue West (southbound only) is part of the above non-revenue streetcar tracks
- Shaw Street between King Street West and Queen Street West
- Ossington Avenue between Dundas Street West and College Street
- Dufferin Street between King Street West and Queen Street West

While the loop along Church, Wellington and York Streets south of King Street resembles the single-track, non-revenue tracks along Adelaide and Richmond Streets, it is revenue track used to turn back 503 Kingston Rd streetcars.

Richmond, Adelaide, Wellington and York Streets used to be two-way streets with double streetcar tracks. After these streets were converted to one-way streets, the TTC had to abandon the use of the wrong-way track.

To accommodate construction of the Ontario Line near Queen station, Metrolinx, the line's sponsor, required the suspension of streetcar traffic between Church and York Streets for 4.5 years. Thus, two new tracks were built: a new southbound streetcar track on York Street to Adelaide Street, and a new eastbound streetcar track on Adelaide Street between York and Victoria Streets. During the diversion, westbound 501 Queen streetcars would divert via Church, Richmond and York Streets while eastbound streetcars would divert via York, Adelaide and Church Streets. After Queen Street reopens to through traffic, the new streetcar tracks would be retained as non-revenue tracks to provide the TTC with flexibility for future diversions and Ontario Line closures. These new tracks went into service on November 6, 2024, for the long-term diversion. The City of Toronto also restored non-revenue streetcar tracks on Adelaide Street between Charlotte and York Streets in addition to the restoration of tracks between York and Victoria Streets to provide further flexibility for diversions.

=== Electrical pickup ===
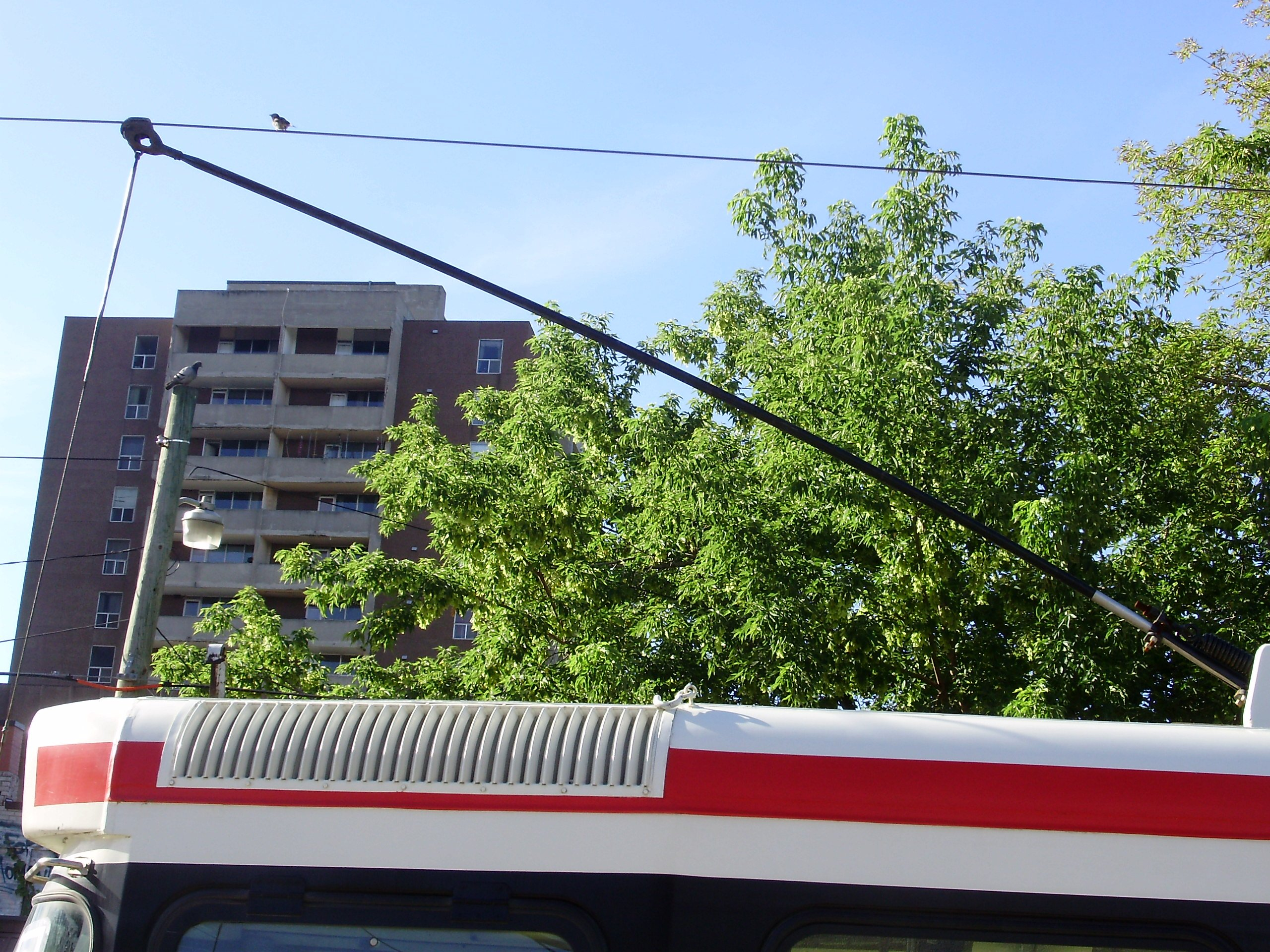
Older streetcar models used by the TTC, like the ALRVs and CLRVs, received their electricity by trolley pole.

The older CLRV and ALRV streetcars had only a trolley pole. Flexity Outlook streetcars have both a pantograph and a trolley pole. All streetcars in service had been using the trolley pole until September 12, 2017, when 509 Harbourfront became the first route to use the pantograph.

With the introduction of the Flexity streetcars, the TTC plans to convert the entire system to be pantograph-compatible. The new streetcars need 50 percent more electric current than the older streetcars, and use of the trolley pole limits the amount of electricity the new cars can draw from the overhead wire, resulting in reduced performance. One consequence of trolley pole use on the Flexity streetcars is that air conditioning does not function in summer. With pantograph operation, the TTC expects Flexity streetcars to have more efficient heating and air conditioning systems, better vehicle performance and fewer delays caused by disconnections from overhead wires.

Since 2008, the TTC has been converting the streetcar overhead wire to be compatible for pantograph electrical pickup as well as for trolley poles. The overhead over the Fleet Street tracks was the first to be converted. The new overhead uses different hangers so that pantographs do not strike supporting crosswires. It also uses a different gauge of wire to handle the higher electrical demands of Flexity streetcars.

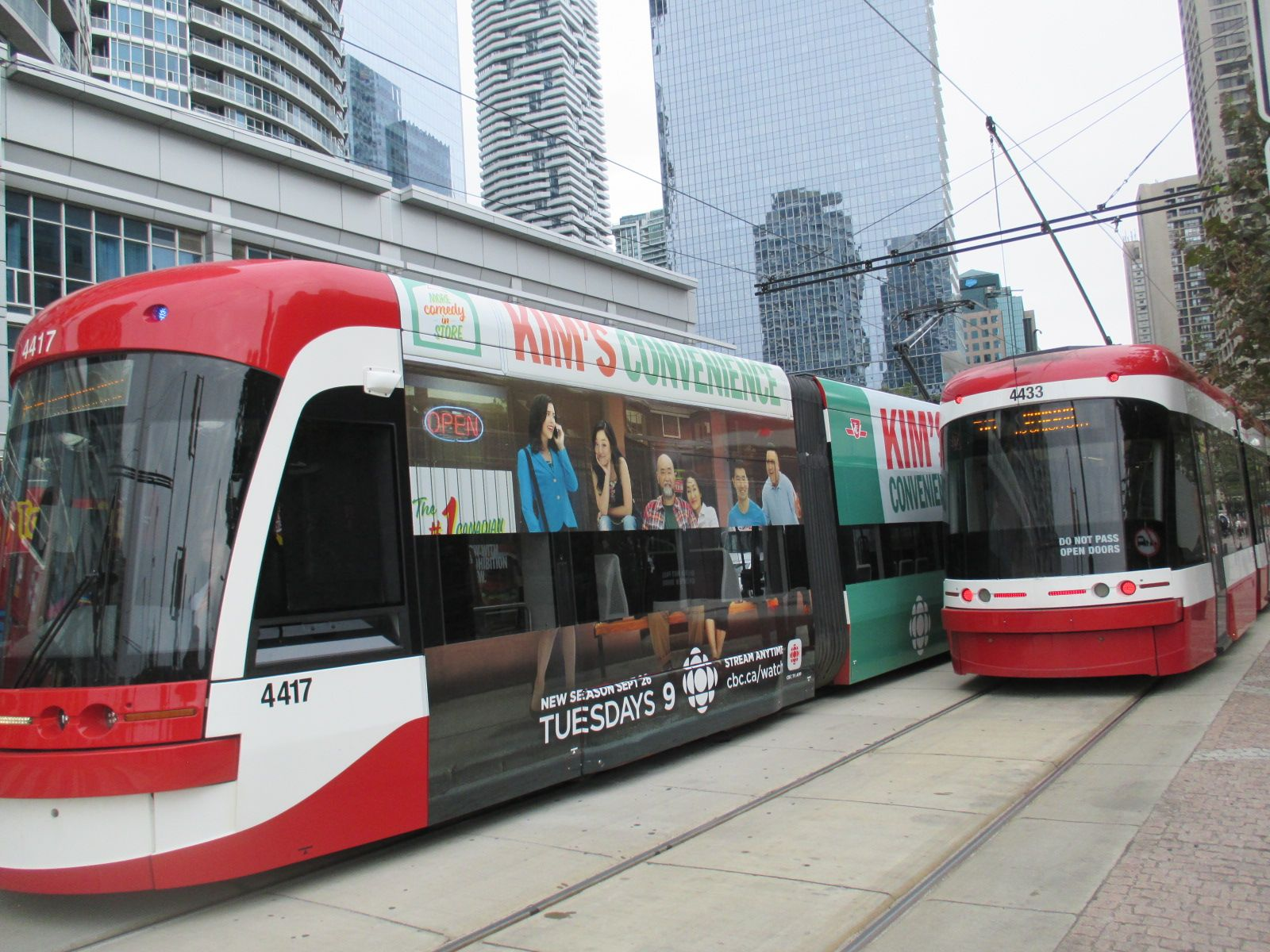
The streetcar to the left uses a pantograph, while the one on the right uses a trolley pole. Conversion of the overhead wire to be compatible with pantographs began in 2008. Note that the one on the left has vinyl wrap for advertising.

During a rainy period in February 2018, the TTC received an incentive to expedite the conversion of the electrical overhead for pantograph use by the Flexity streetcars. On February 20, 2018, Flexity streetcars using trolley poles were pulling down some of the overhead. In Toronto, the tip of the trolley pole has a shoe with a carbon insert to collect current. The carbon insert also lowers the trolley shoe so that it does not strike hangers that are not yet pantograph-compatible. During wet weather, these carbon inserts wear out faster, needing replacement after a day or two for older streetcars. However, because the Flexity streetcars draw more current than older streetcars, their carbon inserts wore out faster in less than eight hours in the wet weather. (There was also an issue with the quality of carbon the TTC purchased.) With pantographs, this would be less of a problem as the pantograph blades have a larger contact area than a trolley shoe to absorb wear. Because of this incident, the TTC decided it should accelerate the conversion of overhead for pantograph use.

The first three routes to operate with pantographs were 509 Harbourfront on September 12, 2017, 510 Spadina on May 14, 2018, and 512 St. Clair on October 1, 2018. The streetcar system has almost 90 kilometres (56 mi) of streetcar overhead along streets and in yards. As of November 2020, 80 percent of the overhead has been converted for pantograph use and half of all streetcar routes use pantographs. The TTC expects full conversion by the first quarter of 2025, when trolley poles will no longer be supported.

=== Dedicated station ===
Queens Quay is the one standalone underground station that does not connect to the subway system. It is located in the tunnel under Bay Street, shared by the 509 Harbourfront and 510 Spadina routes, between Queens Quay West and Union subway station.

=== Carhouses ===
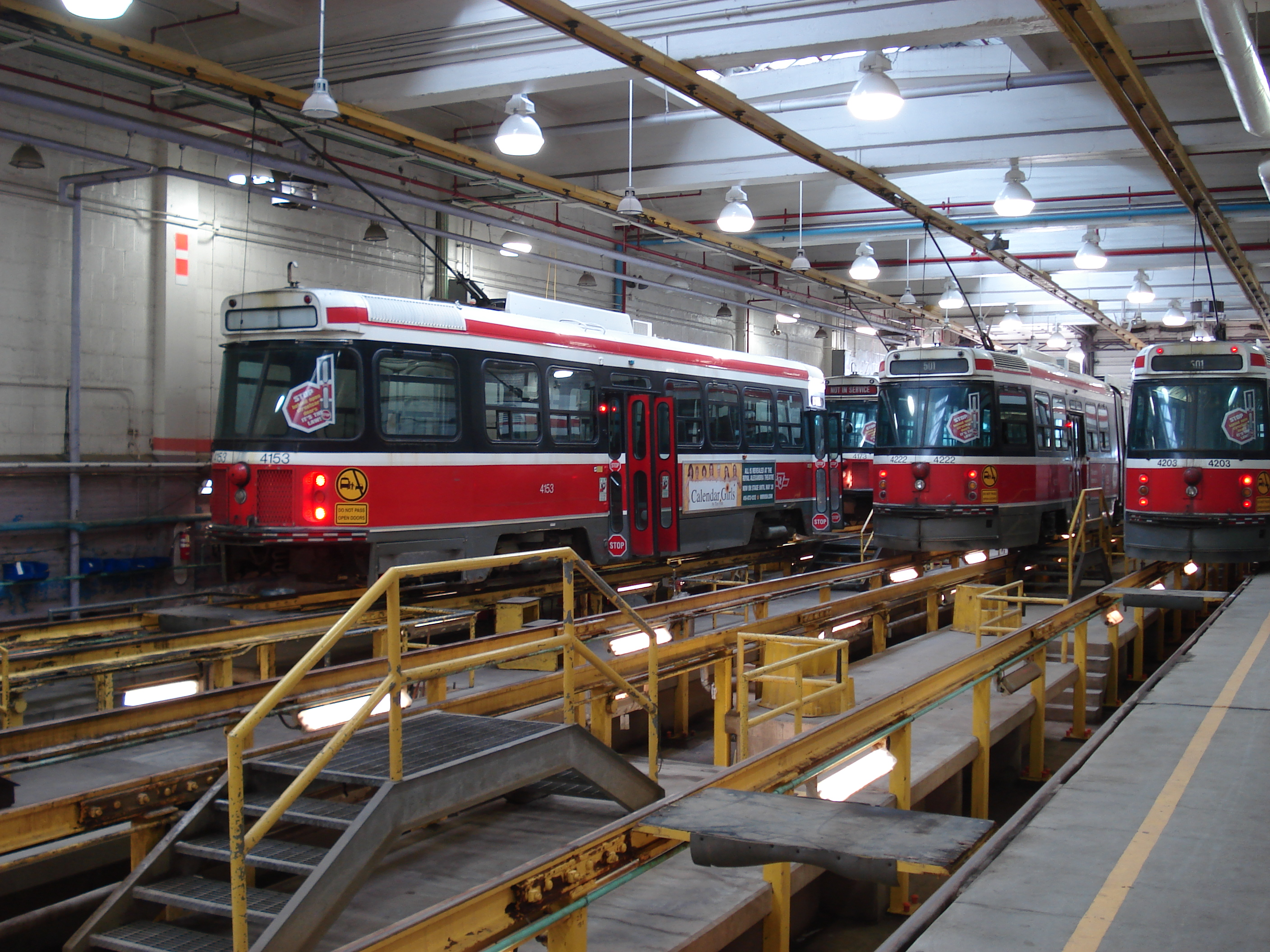
Maintenance tracks at Roncesvalles Carhouse in 2011, one of four maintenance and storage facilities used by the streetcar network

Toronto's streetcars are housed and maintained at various carhouses or "streetcar barns":

Active carhouses
Yard	Location	Year opened	Notes
Hillcrest Complex	Davenport Road and Bathurst Street	1924	Workshops for the heavy maintenance of buses and legacy streetcars.
Roncesvalles Carhouse	Queen Street West and Roncesvalles Avenue	1895 (for TRC); rebuilt 1921 (by TTC)	Property acquired Toronto Railway Company, but new carbarn built in 1921 with indoor inspection and repair facility and outdoor streetcar storage tracks
Russell (Connaught Avenue) Carhouse	Connaught Avenue and Queen Street East	1913 (by TRC and 1916 carhouse added); 1924 (rebuilt by TTC)	Built for the Toronto Railway Company as paint shop and 1916 carhouse built to replace King carhouse lost to a fire in 1916; acquired by the TTC in 1921 and rebuilt in 1924 with indoor maintenance facility and outdoor streetcar storage tracks
Leslie Barns	Leslie Street and Lake Shore Boulevard East – southeast corner	November 2015	For the storage and maintenance (including heavy maintenance) of low-floor streetcars

Several carhouses were once part of the TTC's streetcar operations, many inherited from the TTC's predecessors Toronto Railway Company and Toronto Civic Railways:

Former carhouses
Yard	Location	Year opened	Year closed	Notes
Danforth Carhouse	Danforth Avenue and Coxwell Avenue	1915; 1921–22 (additions by TTC)	2002	built for the Toronto Civic Railways in 1915 and additional indoor storage added by TTC in 1921–22; re-purposed as bus garage in 1967; closed in 2002 but still used by TTC for storage and office space
Dundas Carhouse	Dundas Street West and Howard Park Avenue	1897	1936	Original acquired from TRC (built in 1897), but carhouse was demolished in 1931 but retained for storage for 60 cars; wye and runaround loop since disappeared and area re-developed with cars moving to Roncesvalles in 1938. Site now mixed residential and commercial use.
Eglinton (Yonge) Carhouse	Eglinton Avenue West and Yonge Street	1922	2002; demolished	Built to replace TRC Yorkville Carhouse and retired as carhouse in 1948 to become bus garage until 2002; most of facility now demolished and remainder used as temporary bus terminal
Harbour Yard	Lake Shore Boulevard between Bay and York Streets	1951	1954	Built as temporary outdoor storage space for Peter Witt cars after Eglinton Carhouse closed to streetcars; tracks removed 1954; now site of parking lot and office towers
Lansdowne Carhouse	Lansdowne Avenue and Paton Avenue	1911	1996; demolished 2003	Built for the Toronto Railway Company and acquired by TTC in 1921; became a trolley bus garage in 1947 and streetcar storage ended 1967; abandoned after 1996 and demolished 2003. Site to become a facility for affordable and senior housing.
St. Clair Carhouse	Wychwood Avenue south of St. Clair Avenue West	1914	1978	Built for the Toronto Civic Railways in 1914 and expanded 1916. Acquired by TTC in 1921 and further expanded; closed in 1978 after cars moved to Roncesvalles but continued to be used for storage until the 1990s; tracks removed and restored as community centre named Wychwood Barns.
Yorkville Carhouse	Between Scollard Street and Yorkville Avenue west of Yonge Street	1892	1922	The TRC demolished the Toronto Street Railway's Yorkville stables in order to build the carhouse. In 1922, the TTC closed the carhouse; it was later demolished and is now site of a condominium and Townhall Square Park.

== Service issues ==
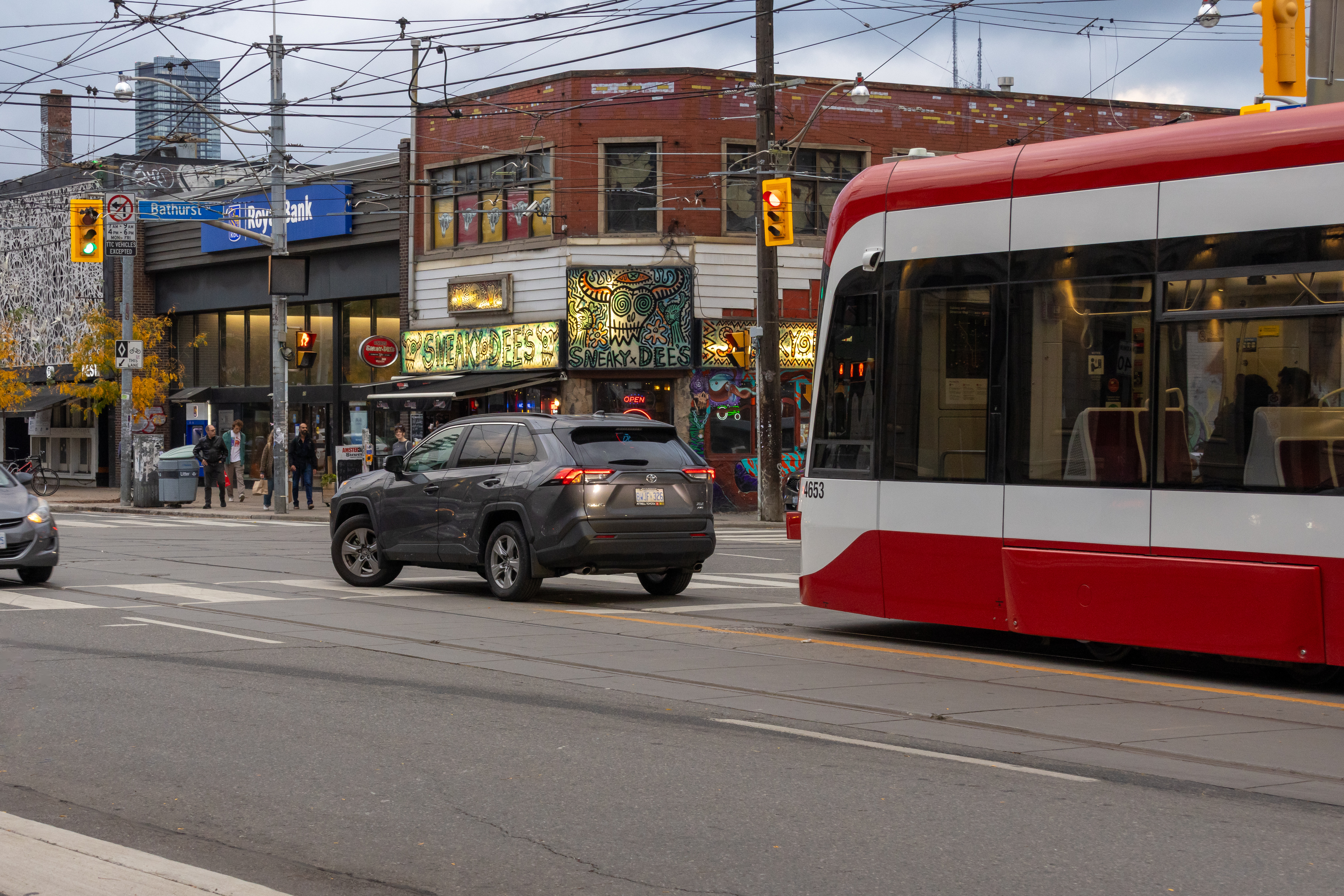
A streetcar held up by a vehicle attempting a left turn on College Street at Bathurst Street. This is a common occurrence on routes without dedicated rights-of-way and can lead to delays and bunching.

Public transit advocacy groups like TTCriders and CodeRedTO push the TTC to improve various aspects of operations. One top issue is streetcar (and bus) bunching – where, due to various delays, later cars catch up to earlier ones and several streetcars then travel in a pack. In some cases, the TTC may then try to balance a streetcar service gap with a short turn, turning one around early; passengers travelling to subsequent stops then have to change to another streetcar in the bunch. In July 2025, the Toronto Environmental Alliance and Environmental Defence Canada joined TTCriders in a call for more dedicated transit lanes.

== Winter operational issues ==
=== Extreme cold weather ===
The fleet of CLRV and ALRV streetcars experienced several operational issues during extreme cold temperatures during late 2013 and early 2014, late 2014 and early 2015, late 2017 and early 2018, and late 2018 and early 2019, as doors and brakes failed as moisture in the pneumatic lines froze. Moisture also caused track sanders to fail. Buses were used to replace streetcars unfit for service, some of which had failed while in service. The new Flexity Outlook streetcars were unaffected by the weather, as they use electronic braking and door operations. During an extreme cold snap between January 20 and 22, 2019, none of the CLRV/ALRV streetcars were in service due to the high risk of breakdowns in the cold weather. Instead, Flexity streetcars, along with buses, were used to provide service. The remaining ALRVs stayed out of service for the rest of that winter season.

By 2020, the CLRV/ALRV vehicles had been entirely replaced by new Flexity streetcars, mitigating these operational issues from occurring in the foreseeable future.

=== Snow and freezing rain ===
The streetcar overhead is vulnerable during freezing rain storms. During such storms, the TTC applies anti-freeze to the overhead wire to prevent ice from interrupting electrical contact. In addition, the TTC attaches "sliders" to trolley poles on every fifth streetcar to knock ice off the overhead wire. The TTC places overhead crews on standby at various locations around the streetcar network to address problems of power loss or overhead wires coming down.

The anti-freeze used on the overheard wire is also applied to streetcar switches on the network. In addition, the TTC runs "storm cars" overnight on all routes to prevent any ice build-up on switches that the anti-freeze could not prevent.

In severe storms, the TTC replaces streetcars with buses on some routes, or portions of routes, in order to concentrate streetcars downtown. By creating a smaller service area, it is easier for TTC crews to keep track and overhead wires free of snow and ice. In the event of a severe storm, the TTC replaces streetcars with buses on routes 506 Carlton, 511 Bathurst, and 512 St. Clair, plus the outer portions of 501 Queen and both branches of 504 King.

Another problem that the TTC must cope with following a heavy snowfall is that motorists park cars too close to streetcar tracks when snow banks narrow streets. Motorists are warned that such vehicles will be towed at the owner's expense to prevent streetcar service delays and diversions. Despite the warning, on a single day after a major snowstorm in February 2025, the TTC reported 23 vehicles blocking streetcar tracks. Streets with streetcar tracks are also snow routes and thus have parking restrictions during snowy conditions.

== Advertising ==
Pattison Outdoor Advertising is responsible for posters outside and inside the streetcars, as well as outside and inside the buses and the subway system, but not the streetcar shelters themselves as Astral Media is responsible for advertisements on them.

== See also ==
- Toronto Transit Commission bus system
- Urban rail transit in Canada
- Metrolinx light rail projects in Toronto:
  - Line 5 Eglinton
  - Line 6 Finch West
- Queen subway line (a 20th-century streetcar route proposal succeeded by the Ontario Line)
- The Queensway § Streetcar right-of-way used by 501 Queen
- Roncesvalles Avenue § Streetcar stop bumpouts along 504 King route
- Birney (Toronto streetcar) (a model of streetcar operated by the TTC)
- Streetcars in North America (for other streetcar lines in North America)
- List of street railways in Canada – a full list of operating and defunct street railways in the country
