= Parliament streetcar line =

Former streetcar route in Toronto, Ontario

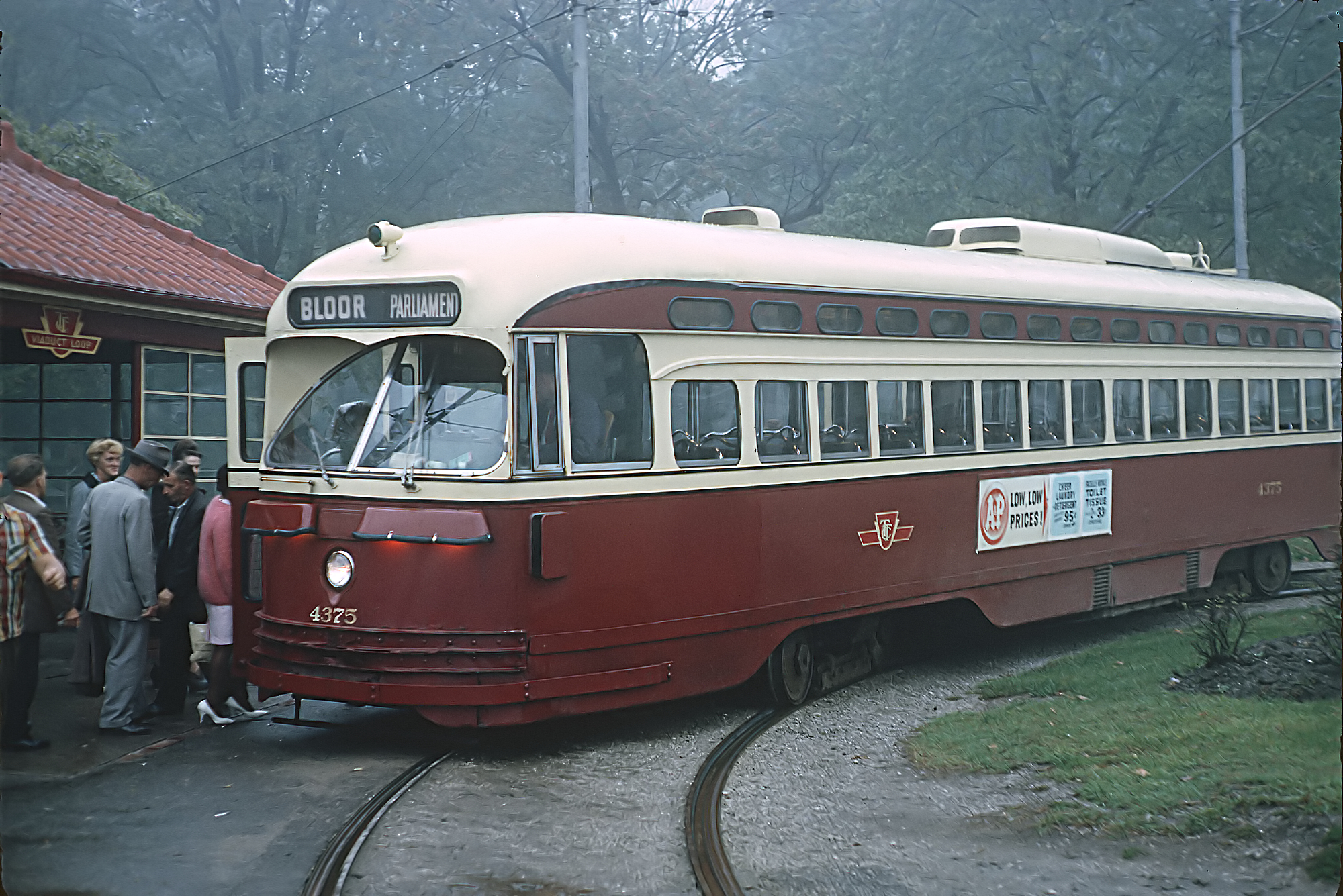
A BLOOR PARLIAMENT car at the loop at Bloor and Parliament, September 8, 1965.

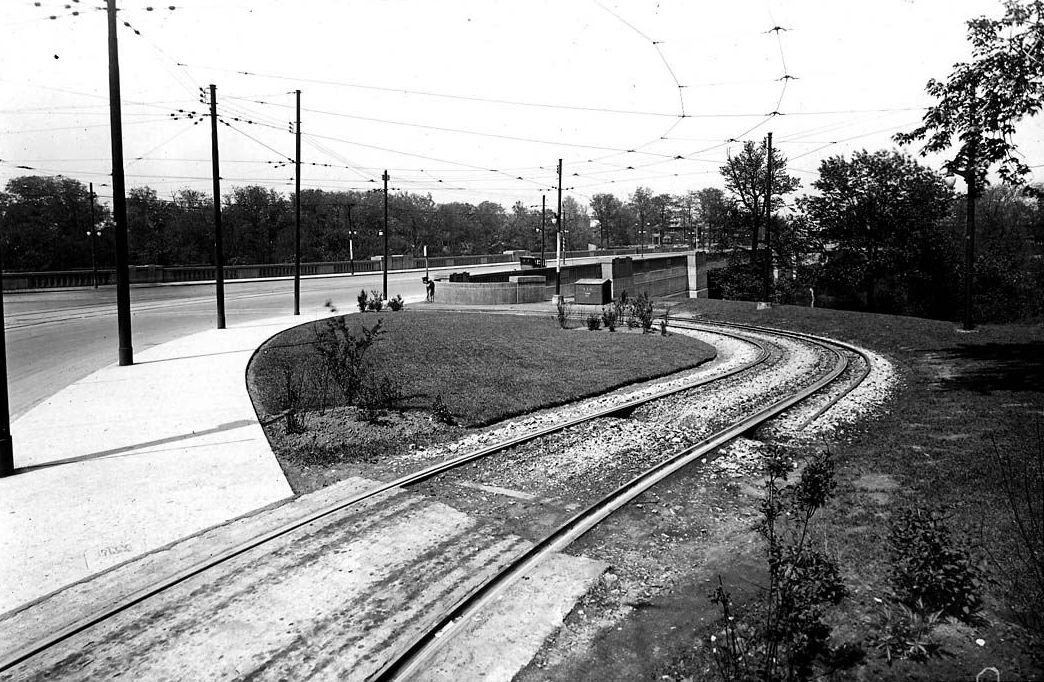
The loop at Bloor and Parliament, shortly after construction.

Various organizations operated streetcars on Parliament Street, in Toronto, Ontario. The Toronto Transit Commission (TTC) discontinued scheduled service on Parliament in 1966, when it opened the Bloor-Danforth subway.

== History ==
In 1874, the Toronto Street Railway opened the Winchester horsecar route, which ran along Carlton Street and turned north a short distance on Parliament Street to Winchester Street. In 1881, this route was extended east on Winchester Street to Sumach Street. In 1881, the TSR opened a second horsecar route on Parliament Street, the Parliament route, running from downtown on Queen Street turning north on Parliament Street then east on Gerrard Street to River Street. After the Toronto Railway Company took over the streetcar system, it electrified both the Winchester and Parliament routes in 1893. The Parliament route name disappeared in 1918 with the tracks between Queen and Gerrard Streets operating as part of the Queen route. Under the TRC, the Winchester route ran with double track on Winchester Street, east to Sackville Street, then further east on a single track to Sumach Street where there was a wye.

On September 1, 1921, the Toronto Transportation Commission (later the Toronto Transit Commission), a City of Toronto agency, took over responsibility for all streetcar lines in Toronto. At that time the Winchester route ran from Sumach Street west on Winchester Street, south on Parliament Street, west on Queen Street to loop via Church, Richmond and Victoria streets. Ex-Toronto Civic Railways Birney streetcars provided service. On July 1, 1923, the TTC renamed the route from Winchester to Parliament but did not modify the route. However, on September 2, a crossover was installed on Parliament Street just north of Queen Street, to become the new southern terminus of the Parliament route.

On August 3, 1924, the Parliament route was extended north on Parliament Street from Winchester Street to the new Viaduct Loop on Bloor Street, enabling a transfer to the Bloor streetcar line. The track on Winchester, from Parliament to Sumach, was then abandoned and replaced by bus service.

On January 2, 1925, one-man, ex-Toronto Railway Company streetcars replaced Birneys on Sundays and holidays, with service extended to Victoria Street. On May 5, 1940, it also became daily service.

On October 20, 1940, Peter Witt streetcars replaced ex-TRC streetcars on the Parliament route.

On December 16, 1946, special work was installed at the intersection of Parliament and King streets as part of a track extension on Parliament Street from Queen Street. The main purpose of this junction was to allow some King cars to short-turn via Parliament and Dundas streets returning via Broadview Avenue. On January 5, 1947, Parliament streetcars started to use to use the new Parliament Loop at the south-west corner of King and Parliament streets instead of looping downtown via Victoria Street.

On June 8, 1948, PCC streetcars replaced Witt cars in base service.

During the 1960s, the TTC was slowly replacing streetcar routes with bus routes. When the TTC replaced most of the Bloor streetcar line with the Bloor-Danforth subway, it also replaced several north–south streetcar routes such as the Parliament route with buses.

Streetcar tracks remain in use from Carlton Street to King. The 506 Carlton streetcar route uses the block of Parliament between Carlton and Gerrard. Streetcars use the remaining track when they are shifted from one route to another or when a traffic accident or routine maintenance requires a temporary diversion.
