= Toronto streetcar system rolling stock =

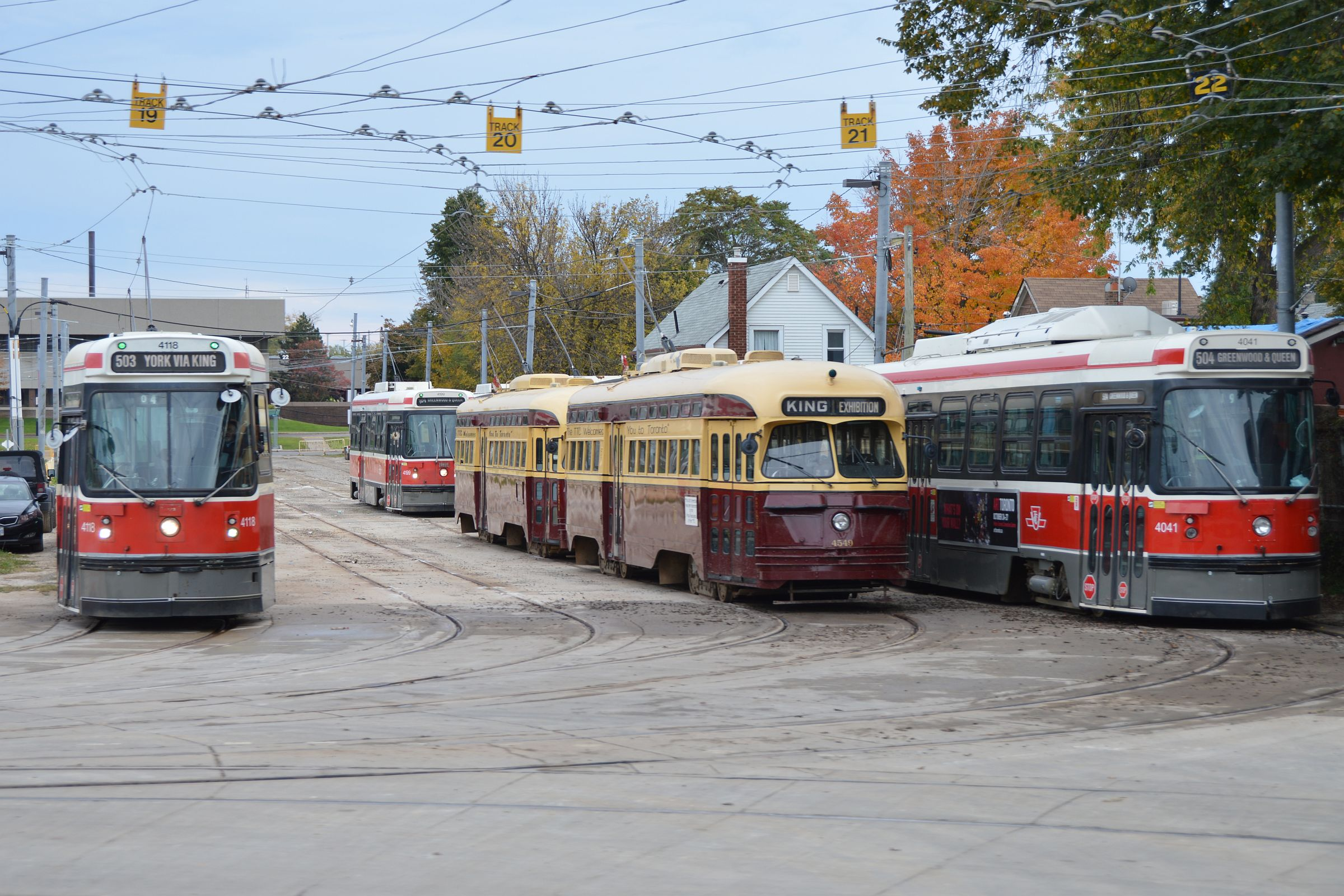
CLRVs and PCCs at the Russell Carhouse

In 1921, the Toronto Transportation Commission (TTC) was created to integrate and operate the Toronto streetcar system. The system has had various types of rolling stock throughout its history.

The TTC inherited the infrastructure of two separate streetcar operators: the Toronto Railway Company (TRC) and Toronto Civic Railways (TCR). It immediately embarked on a program to connect the TRC and TCR lines into one network. The TTC had to rebuild most of the track to provide a wider devilstrip so that the wider Peter Witt streetcars it was ordering could pass without sideswiping. Between 1938 and 1945, it placed five orders for air-electric PCC streetcars to replace the old, wooden streetcars of the TRC, and to address rising ridership. Between 1947 and 1951, the TTC placed three orders for all-electric PCC cars, with one order equipped with couplers for multiple-unit operation. Between 1950 and 1957, the TTC purchased PCCs from four American cities (Cincinnati, Cleveland, Birmingham and Kansas City). By 1957, the TTC (later renamed the Toronto Transit Commission in 1954, which uses the same acronym) had more PCCs than any other city in North America. After the opening of the Bloor–Danforth subway (today Line 2 Bloor–Danforth) in 1966, the TTC considered terminating all streetcar service in Toronto. However, in 1972, a citizens group led by Jane Jacobs and Steve Munro called "Streetcars for Toronto" persuaded the City to retain streetcar operation. This led to the development of the Canadian Light Rail Vehicle (CLRV) and its longer, articulated cousin, the Articulated Light Rail Vehicle (ALRV), to replace the aging PCC fleet. The Accessibility for Ontarians with Disabilities Act (AODA) mandated that the next generation of streetcars be wheelchair-accessible. Thus, to replace the CLRVs and ALRVs, Bombardier adapted its low-floor Flexity Outlook model for the TTC to navigate the Toronto streetcar system's tight curves and single-point switches, characteristics set in 1921 to accommodate Peter Witt streetcars, as well as for the unique broad gauge.

== Inherited streetcars ==
When the Toronto Transportation Commission was created in 1921, it inherited the facilities of its two predecessor companies: the Toronto Railway Company (TRC) and the Toronto Civic Railways (TCR).

=== Ex-TRC streetcars ===
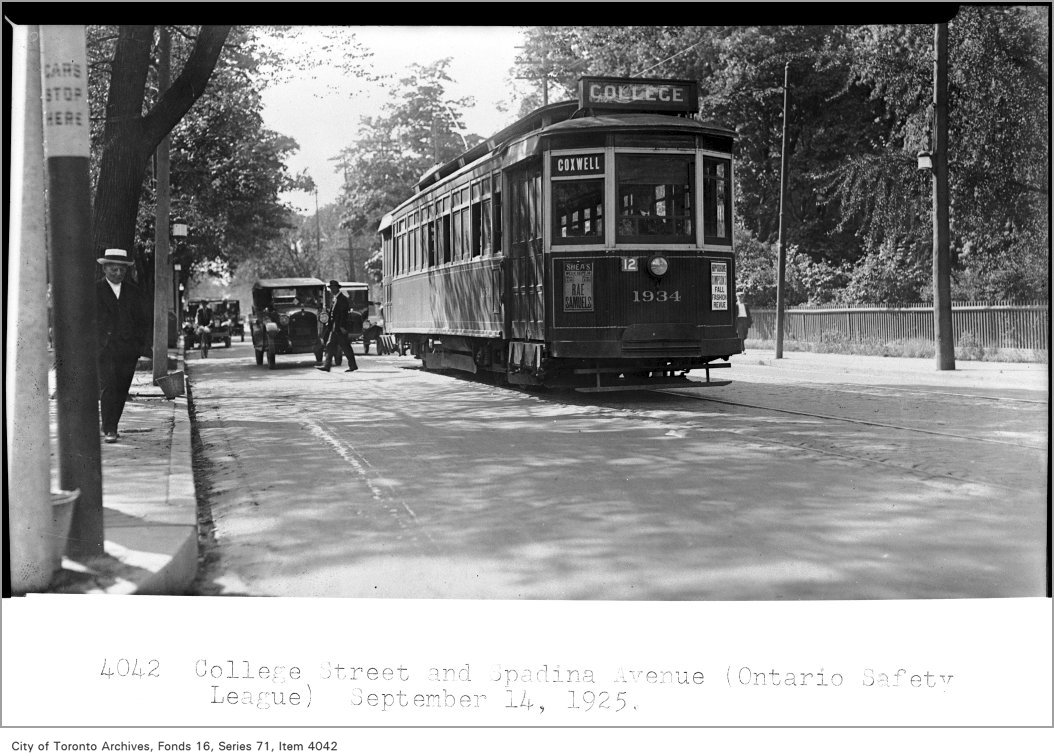
Class BB ex-TRC streetcar on the College route on September 14, 1925

The Toronto Transportation Commission inherited 830 streetcars from the Toronto Railway Company. However, the TTC found that only 351 of them were worth retaining; thus, the TTC disposed of the remaining 479 by 1924. (Two of the disposed cars were relics – horsecar 64, built in 1879, and streetcar 306, built in 1892. Both were ultimately sent to the Canada Science and Technology Museum in Ottawa.)

The 351 streetcars the TTC chose to retain were single-ended streetcars built between 1906 and 1917 in the TRC's own shops. They were all even-numbered and retained their original TRC car numbers. The TTC modified these streetcars and reclassified them into four classes by sets of features.

The A- and A1-class cars were operated from the mid-1920s as six-motor trains with an A1-class (four-motor) car leading a coupled A-class (two-motor) car. These trains required a crew of three, two for the lead car and another for the trailing car. Six-motor trains lasted until 1933 when the A-class cars were retired due to a decline of ridership during the Great Depression. After the retirement of the A-class cars, the A1-class cars would pull a Class N or Q trailer until 1934.

The Class C cars had a Tomlinson coupler to pull a Class N or Q trailer, which in later years would be semi-permanently attached. The Class C cars were retired in 1949. The trailers were then reassigned. Class C-1 was a variation of Class C omitting the coupler. These cars required a two-man crew.

The class with the largest group of ex-TRC cars was Class BB. Twenty BB-class cars were transferred to other cities during World War II: 5 to Fort William, 10 to Ottawa and 5 to Quebec City. The Class BB cars were the last of the ex-TRC cars to be retired, the last forty being retired in 1951. Class BB car 1326 is preserved at the Halton County Radial Railway museum. These cars required a crew of one.

Between 1923 and 1933, the TTC modified all of its ex-TRC cars, at least once, often twice and in one case (1328) thrice, each time converting the car from one class to another. A common second conversion was from C or C1 (two-man operation) to BB class (one-man operation). All C1 cars and many C-class cars were converted to BB-class by 1933. The following tables reflect the classes of retained ex-TRC streetcars after the final modification. The table is in TRC class and year built sequence, and roughly in car number sequence.

TTC Class	Class characteristics	Last retirement	Class size
A	1-man, front entrance/exit, rear treadle-operated exit, MU 2nd car, 2 motors	1933	33
A1	2-man, front entrance, rear exit, pay-as-you-leave, MU 1st car, 4 motors	1948	33
BB	1-man, front entrance/exit, rear treadle-operated exit	1951	243
C	2-man, front entrance, rear exit, pay-as-you-leave, Tomlinson couplers	1950	42
Total			351

TRC Class	Year built	TTC Class	Fleet numbers (Cars even-numbered)	Fleet size
M3	1906–1907	A	1170–1194	13
N1	1907–1908	A	1202–1234, 1238–1242	20
N1	1907–1908	A1	1244–1300, 1306–1308	31
N1	1907–1908	BB	1310	1
N2	1908	A1	1302–1304	2
O1	1909–1910	BB	1312–1330	10
O2	1910–1911	BB	1332–1356, 1360–1368, 1374–1386	25
O3	1911	BB	1388–1484, 1488–1504, 1510–1526, 1532–1548, 1552–1562	82
O4	1912	BB	1764–1782, 1786–1792, 1796–1800, 1804–1818, 1816–1826, 1830–1860	44
O5	1912–1913	BB	1862–1926	33
O5	1912–1913	C	1928–1974, 1978–1986, 1990–2014	42
P1	1915–1916	BB	2016–2020, 2024–2062	23
P2	1917	BB	2064–2092	15
P3	1917	BB	2094–2112	10
Total				351

=== Ex-TCR streetcars ===
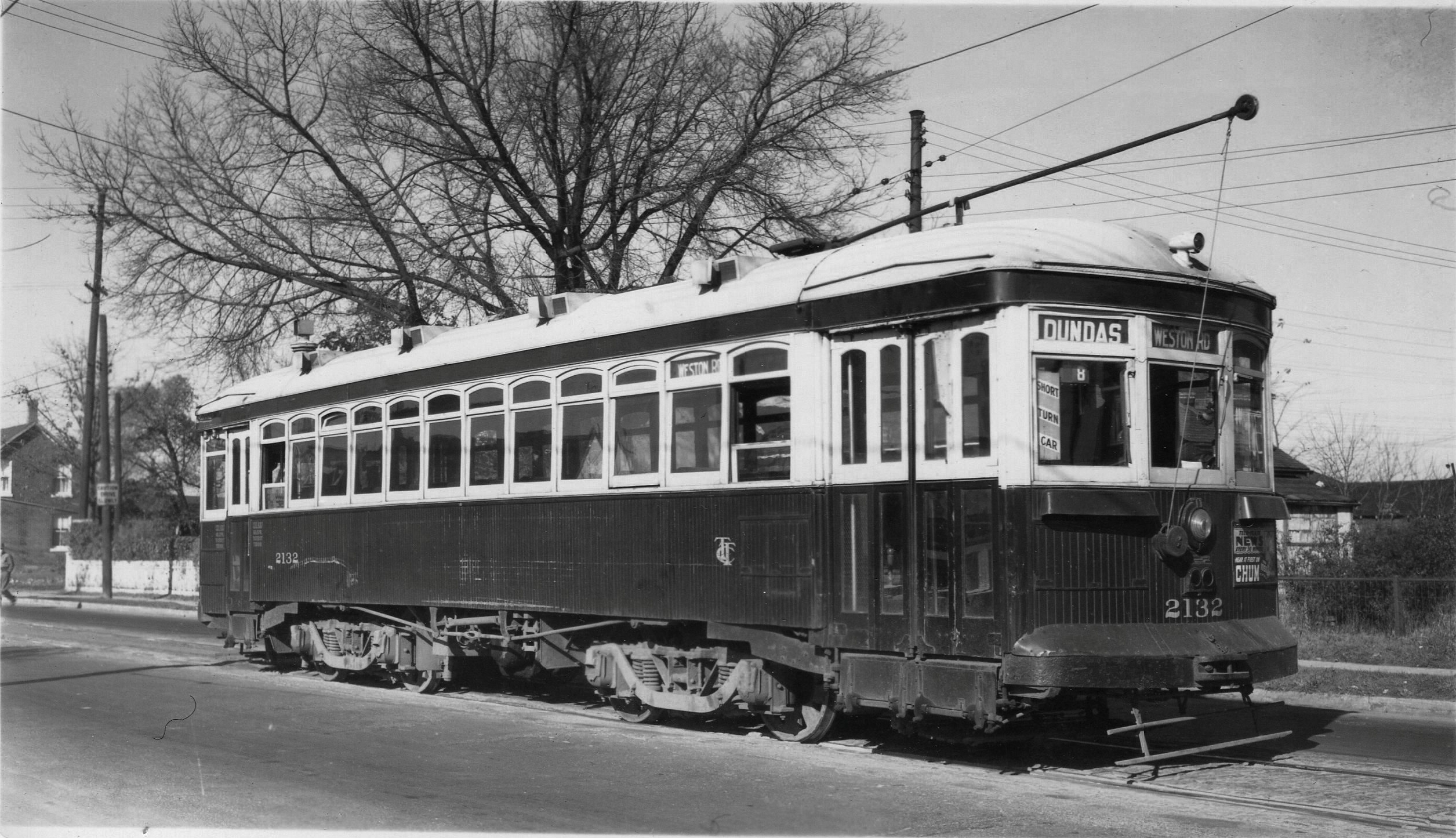
Class H streetcar on Weston route in 1947

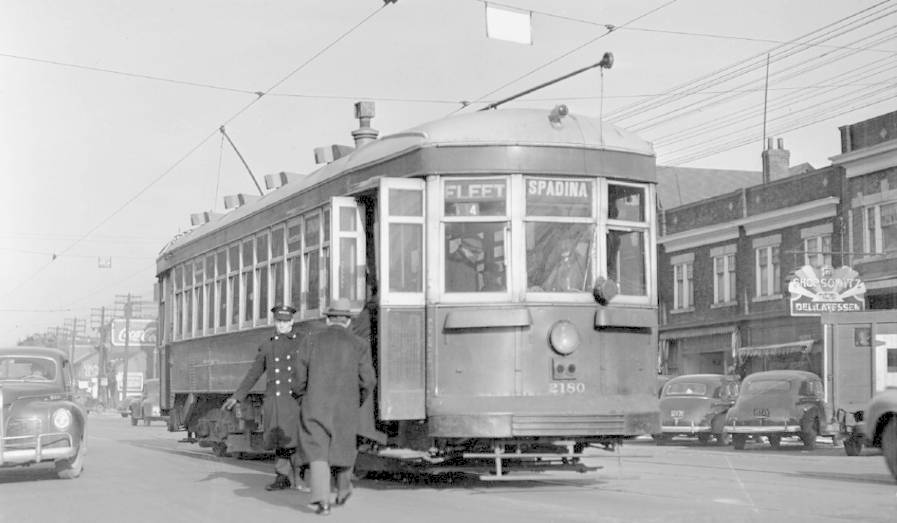
Class J streetcar on Spadina route circa 1943

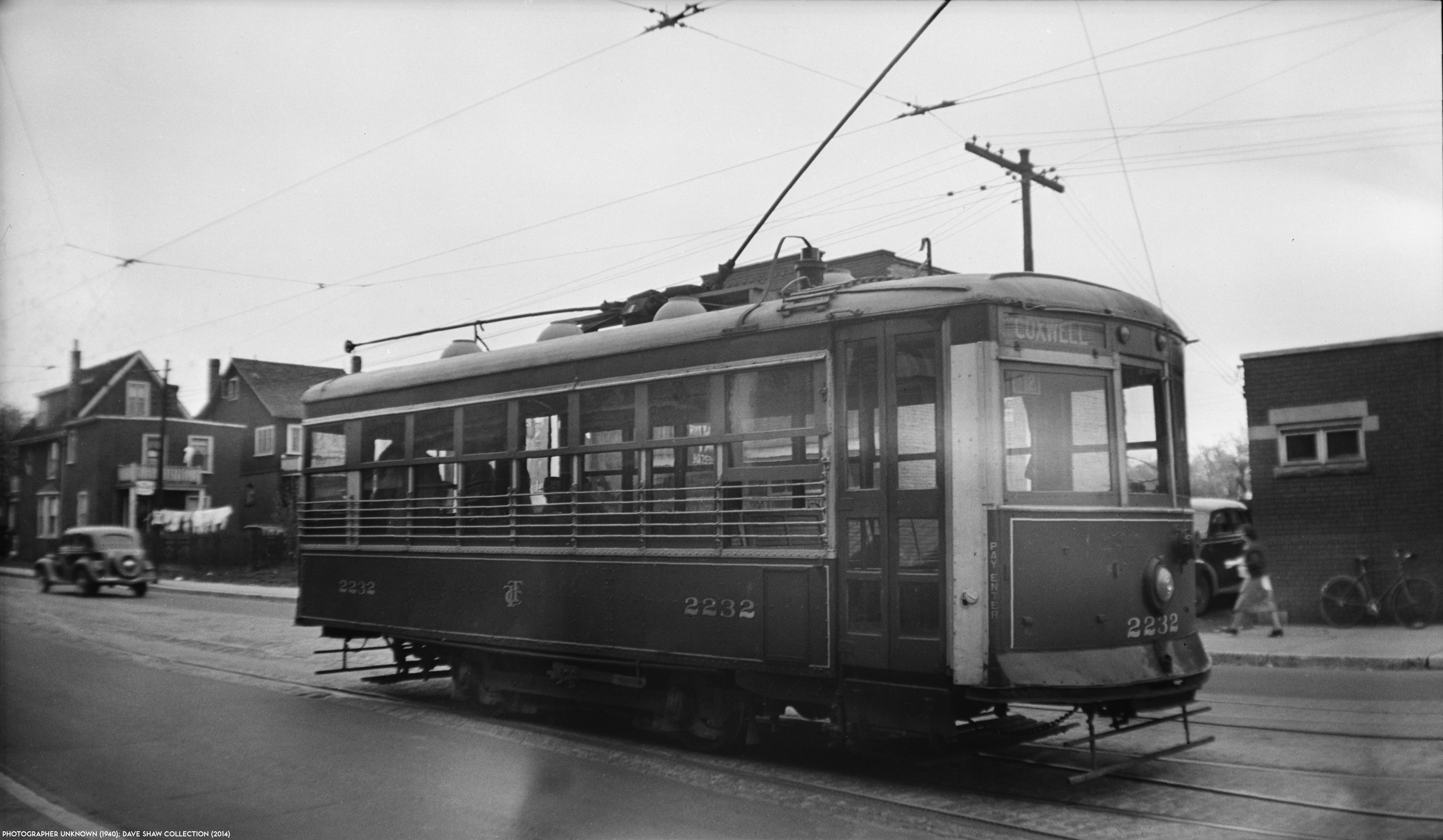
Class G Birney streetcar on Coxwell route in 1940

The TTC inherited the TCR fleet in 1921, and renumbered the cars (using even numbers only) in May 1923. Many of the TRC cars stayed in passenger service in Toronto until 1948. All TCR cars were double-ended.

The TTC initially used the four Class I double-truck streetcars (TCR 120–123, TTC 2120–2126) for temporary service on lines being converted from single to double-track. All were scrapped in 1936, with the exception of car 2120, which the TTC converted into a snow scraper and used on the North Yonge Railways until 1948.

The TTC used the double-truck Class H cars (TCR 100–119, TTC 2128–2144 & 2148–2166) mainly on the Weston route and also on Spadina route until 1948. TCR car 109 (TTC 2146) was destroyed by fire in 1921.

The Class J (TCR 200–212, TTC 2168–2192) double-truck streetcars ran mainly on the Spadina route and also on the Weston route until 1948.

The TTC used the Class F, single-truck streetcars (TCR 50–57, TTC 2200–2214) for rush-hour service until 1926 after which they were converted into snow scrapers. The only three survivors of the entire TCR fleet are from this class, and all three are preserved at the Halton County Radial Railway Museum in Milton, Ontario. Preserved TCR car 55 (TTC 2210) was restored to its original TCR condition. The TTC had converted the other two surviving Class F cars into rail grinders and both are preserved as such at the museum. TCR 52 (TTC 2204) became subway rail grinder RT-7, and TCR 57 (TTC 2214) became streetcar system rail grinder W-28.

Class G (TCR: 60–84, TTC 2216–2264) consisted of single-truck Birney cars, which were used on various TTC routes, such as Davenport and Coxwell, until 1940. The cars were sold in 1927, 1940 and 1941 to run in Cornwall and Halifax until 1949, after which they were scrapped.

In May 1923, the TTC renumbered all the TCR streetcars with even numbers only. The year retired column refers to retirement from passenger service in Toronto; it excludes cars sold to other operators (Class G) or retirements from work car service after conversion.

TTC Class	Builder	Description	TTC fleet numbers	TCR fleet numbers	Fleet size	Year(s) acquired	Year(s) retired
I	McGuire-Cummings	DE-DT	2120–2126	120–123	4	1912	1933
H	Niles	DE-DT	2128–2144, 2148–2166	100–119	19	1913	1933 (4 cars); 1948 (15 cars)
J	Preston	DE-DT	2168–2192	200–212	13	1918	1949
F	Preston	DE-ST	2200–2214	50–57	8	1915–1917	1926
G	Brill	Birney; DE-ST	2216–2264	60–84	25	1920	1927 (11 cars); 1940–1941 (14 cars)

== Peter Witt streetcars ==
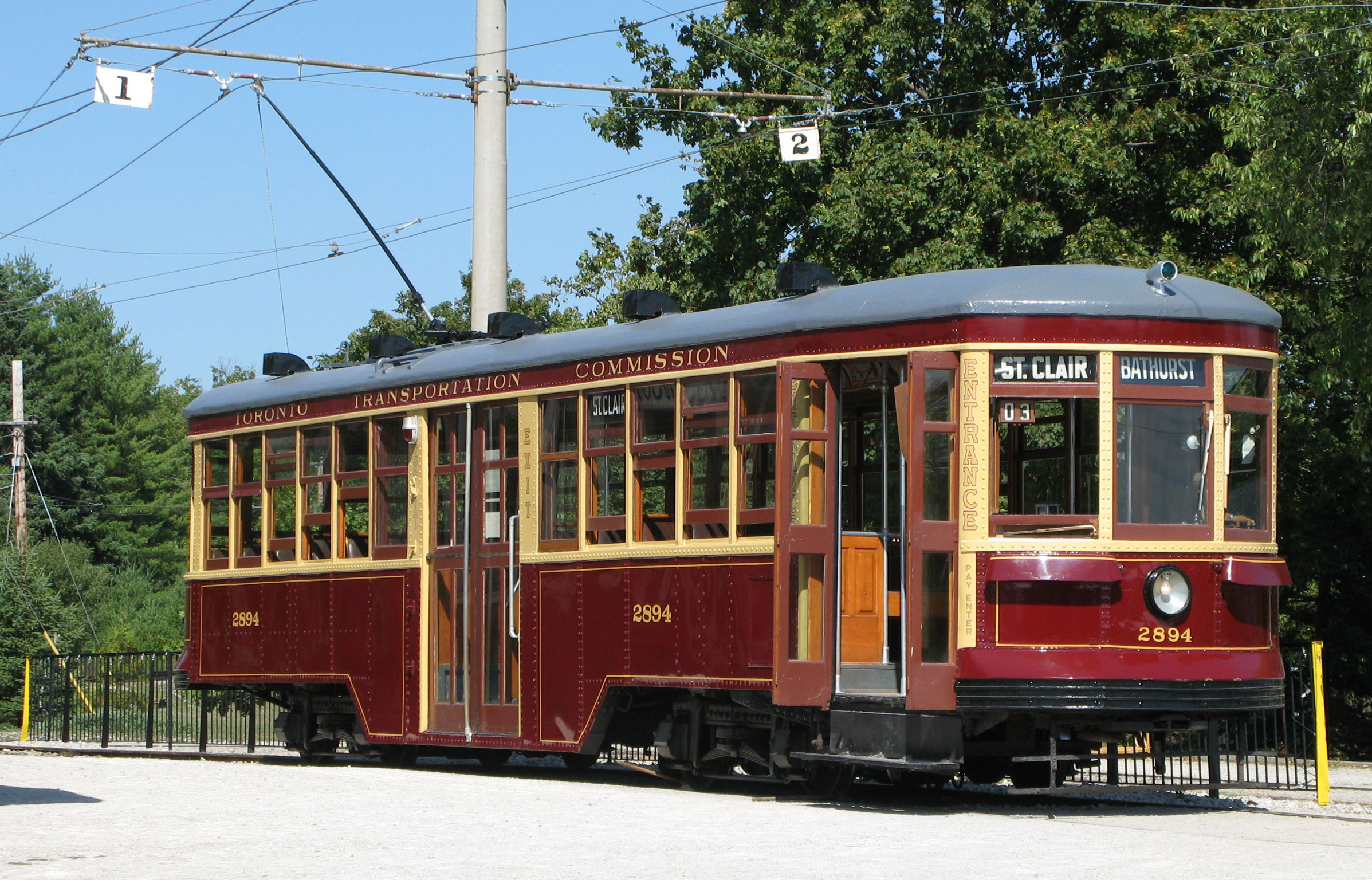
Class P2 small Peter Witt streetcar preserved at the Halton County Radial Railway Museum

The Peter Witt streetcars were the first new vehicles ordered by the Toronto Transportation Commission; however, they required a major change in the trackwork before they could run. The new cars were wider than the older TRC cars, and the devilstrip between parallel tracks was too narrow at 3 feet 10 inches (1.17 m). The TTC had to relay track throughout the system to widen the devil strip to 5 feet 4 inches (1.63 m).

The Peter Witt streetcars, the first all-steel streetcars in Toronto, came in two versions: large and small. The large Witts were 51 feet 10 inches (15.80 m) long and had 60 seats; the small Witts, 47 feet (14 m) long and 55 seats. The large Witts had a slow speed but the strength to pull a trailer. The small Witts were faster in operation, could move along better in traffic but could not pull a trailer. Trailer-trains were used on heavily travelled routes such as Yonge, Bloor, College and Dundas.

A streetcar gets a "Peter Witt" designation if it was built using the Peter Witt fare payment design. With Peter Witt streetcars, passengers enter by the front doors and pay their fare as they walk past the conductor seated just before centre doors. Passengers must pay their fare when they pass the conductor either to exit the car by the centre doors or to access the rear of the car. This scheme was dubbed "pay-as-you-pass". Passengers could ride in the unpaid front portion of the car or in the paid rear portion. During the Great Depression, which began in October 1929, to cut costs, many Witt cars were converted to one-man operation, eliminating the conductor's position and relocating the fare box at the car's entrance.

The "Peter Witt" trailers were not of the Peter Witt design because of their door arrangement. The Class N trailers had two narrow centre doors flanking the conductor's position, and were slow to load and unload. Thus, the three-door Class Q trailers (also known as Harvey trailers) were introduced with a double door on one side of the conductor's position and a single, narrow door on the other side. One of the doors had a gate so that it could be used as either an entry or exit.

Originally, all but the class P small Witt vehicles had a fully enclosed operator cab. (This feature would not be repeated in Toronto until the introduction of the Flexity Outlook in 2014.) Around 1940, the cab walls were removed.

The first major retirement came in 1938 with the introduction of PCC streetcars. All 60 class N trailers and 30 of the class Q trailers were withdrawn with PCCs replacing Peter Witt trailer-trains on the Bloor and Dundas streetcar routes. These were the first of the new cars purchased by the TTC to be scrapped after only 15 to 17 years of service. The next major retirement came in 1954 with the opening of the original subway, which is primarily along Yonge Street (today a part of Line 1 Yonge–University). All the remaining trailers and all of the large Peter Witt cars were retired. The subway replaced the Yonge streetcar line, which heavily used Peter Witt trailer-trains. The final major retirement, this time of the remaining small Peter Witt cars, came in 1965 following the opening of the University subway in 1963 (also a part of Line 1 Yonge–University).

Motor cars are even-numbered; trailers are odd-numbered:

Class	Builder	Description	Fleet numbers	Fleet size	Year(s) built	Last retired
K	CC&F	large Peter Witt w/trailer coupler	2300–2498	100	1921	1954
L1	CC&F	large Peter Witt w/trailer coupler	2500–2578	40	1921	1954
M	Brill	large Peter Witt w/trailer coupler	2580–2678	50	1922	1954
P1	CC&F	small Peter Witt	2700–2798	50	1922–1923	?
P2	Ottawa	small Peter Witt	2800–2898	50	1923	1965
L2	CC&F	large Peter Witt w/trailer coupler	2900–3018	60	1923	1954
Trailers:
N	CC&F	2-door trailer	2301–2419	60	1921	1938
Q	CC&F	3-door trailer	2701–3029	165	1923	1954

== PCC streetcars ==
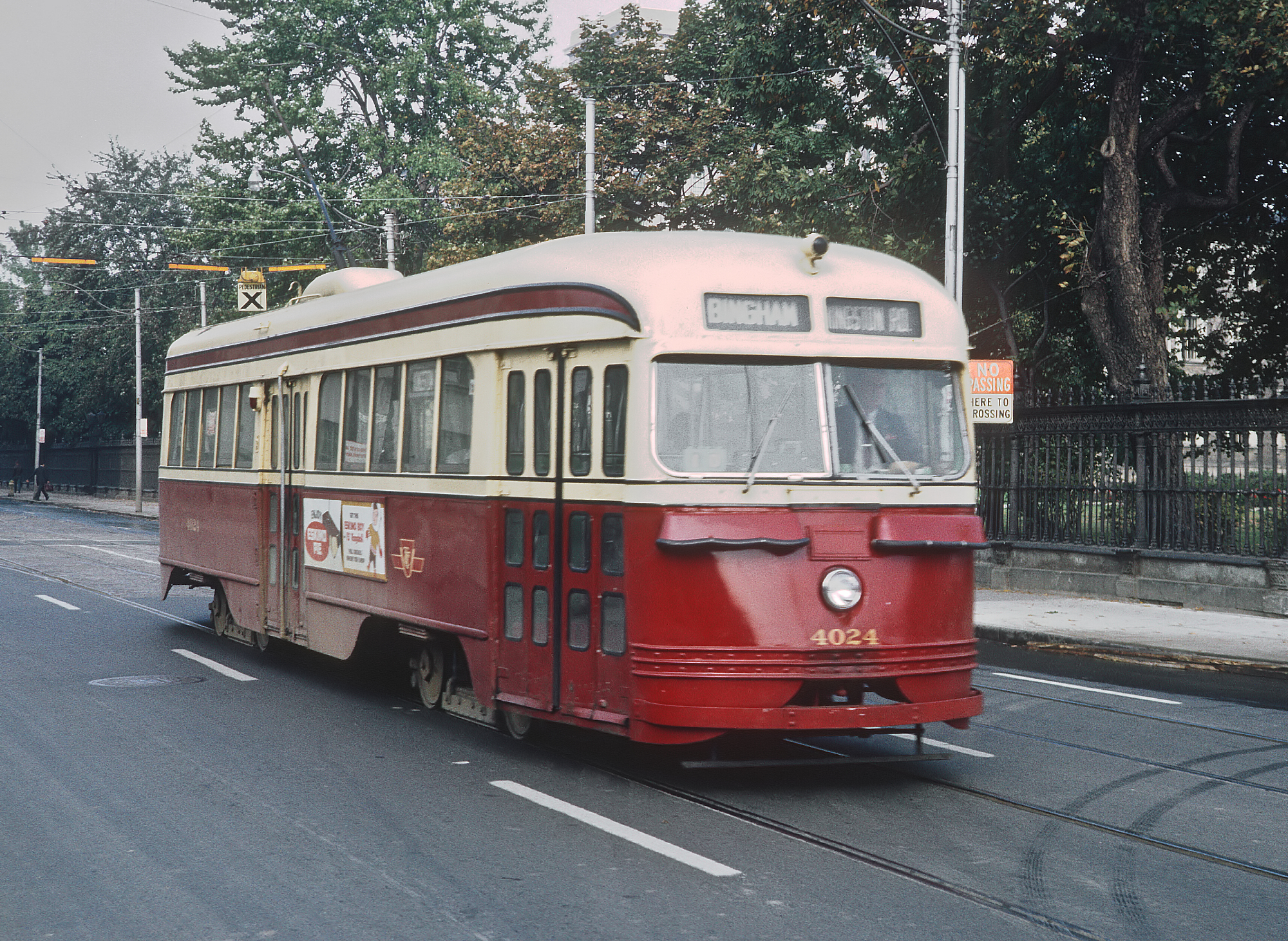
A1-class air-electric PCC streetcar in 1965

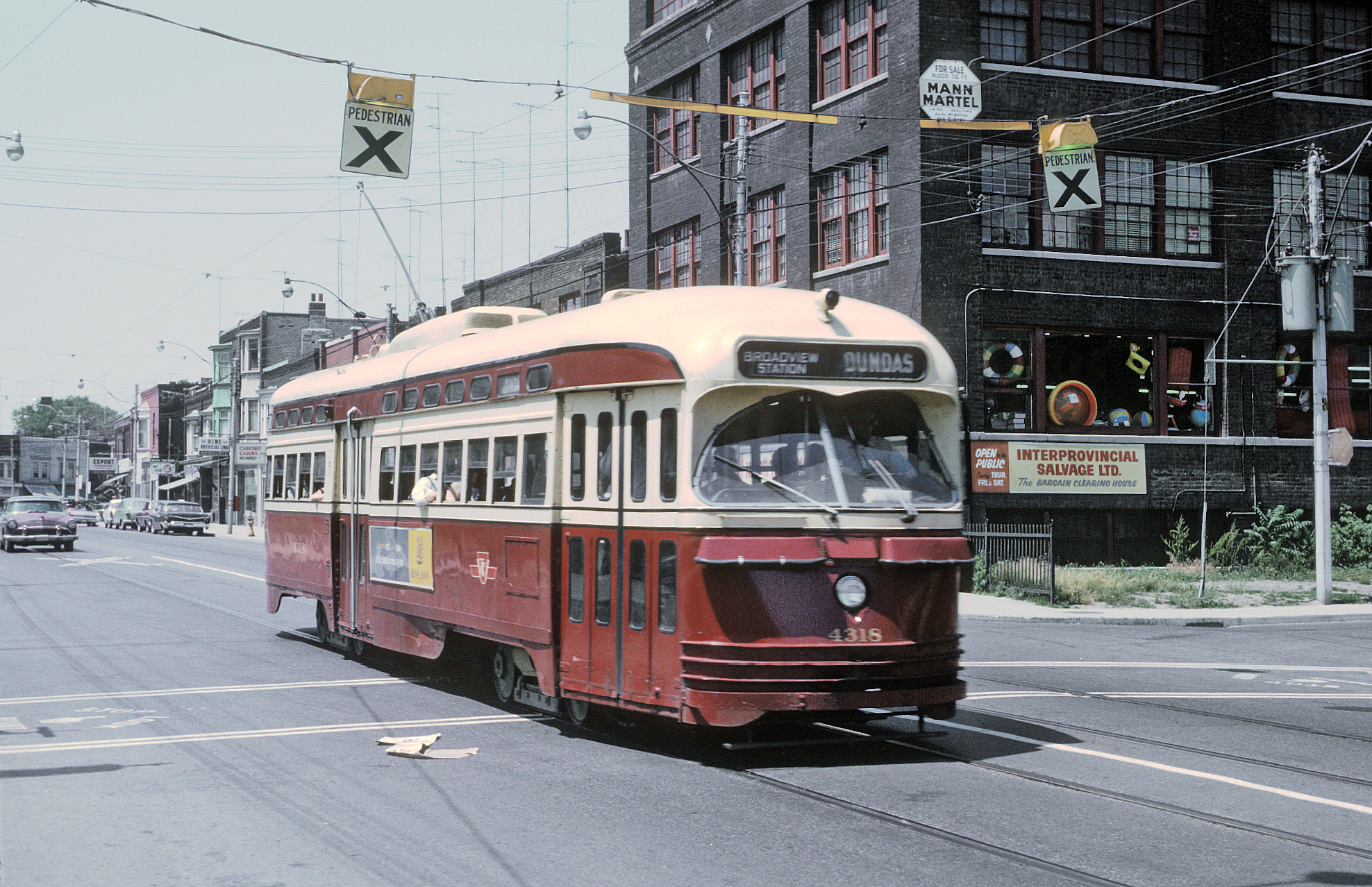
A6-class all-electric PCC streetcar in 1966

The TTC was among the first transit agencies to buy the then-state-of-the-art PCC streetcars, which were designed by a committee of public transport operators in the 1930s but were modified to the TTC's specifications. The TTC bought these cars to replace the Peter Witt cars and older vehicles inherited from the Toronto Railway Company. The TTC's first purchase was in 1938, and by the end of the 1950s, they operated a larger fleet of PCCs than any other agency in the world with 744 cars in service.

The TTC purchased 745 PCC streetcars in all, 317 air-electric (with air-compressor) and 428 all-electric (no air-compressor), 540 new and 205 used (from several U.S. operators abandoning streetcar service). 175 PCCs had couplers for multiple-unit operation, and the TTC used them to assemble two-car PCC trains. (The TTC had only a maximum of 744 PCCs in service because PCC 4063 was scrapped after it derailed and crashed into a carhouse wall in 1947.)

In 1963, with the opening of the University subway (part of today's Line 1 Yonge–University) and the closure of the Dupont streetcar route, the last of the Peter Witt streetcars were retired, resulting in a 100-percent PCC streetcar fleet.

The first major retirement of PCCs occurred with the opening of the Bloor–Danforth subway (today Line 2 Bloor–Danforth) in 1966. The heavily used Bloor streetcar line (where two-car PCC trains ran) plus four intersecting streetcar routes (Coxwell, Harbord, Parliament, Fort) were abandoned. The all-electric PCCs from the Bloor route were moved elsewhere displacing the older air-electric cars, many of which were sold to a transit operator in Egypt.

In the late 1980s, as CLRVs were replacing the ageing PCC fleet, the TTC started to create a new class of PCC cars (class A15) by rebuilding A8-class cars. By 1992, it had rebuilt 19 PCCs for use on the new 604 Harbourfront streetcar line (part of today's 510 Spadina and 509 Harbourfront service). However, in 1995, the A15 class PCCs were retired because the CLRV fleet could handle the ridership, which had declined by that time. The TTC retained A15-class PCCs 4500 and 4549 for excursions and special events.

The following PCC streetcars made up the TTC fleet:

Class	Builder	Description	Fleet numbers	Fleet size	Year(s) built	Year retired	Notes
A1	CC&F	Air-electric	4000–4139	140	1938	1966	4000 at Halton County Radial Railway
A2	CC&F	Air-electric	4150–4199	50	1940	1966	
A3	CC&F	Air-electric	4200–4259	60	1941–1942	1971	
A4	CC&F	Air-electric	4260–4274	15	1943–1944	1970	
A5	CC&F	Air-electric	4275–4299	25	1944–1945	1970	
A6	CC&F	All-electric	4300–4399	100	1947	1992	4386 at Halton County Radial Railway
A7	CC&F	All-electric, MU	4400–4499	100	1949	1992	4426 at Halton County Radial Railway
A8	CC&F	All-electric	4500–4549	50	1950–1951	1992	19 cars rebuilt to become class A15; (4500, 4511, 4518 renumbered as 4600, 4611 and 4618 at Halton County Radial Railway)
A9	St. Louis	All-electric	4550–4574	25	1947	1982	Ex–Cincinnati Street Railway; Purchased 1950
A10	St. Louis	Air-electric	4575–4601	27	1939–1940	1975	Ex–Cincinnati Street Railway; Purchased 1950
A11	Pullman	All-electric, MU	4625–4674	50	1946	1982	Ex–Cleveland Transit System
A12	St. Louis	All-electric, MU	4675–4699	25	1946	1982	Ex–Louisville Railway Company; Ex–Cleveland Transit System; Purchased 1952; 4684 at Halton County Radial Railway
A13	Pullman	All-electric	4700–4747	48	1946–1947	1983	Ex–Birmingham Electric Company; Purchased 1952
A14	St. Louis	All-electric	4750–4779	30	1946–1947	1977	Ex–Kansas City Public Service Company Purchased 1957
A15	TTC	All-electric	4600–4618	19	1986–1991	1995	Rebuilt from A8 class cars Two remain in TTC possession for historical use, charters or special events 4600, 4611 and 4618 are at Halton County Radial Railway; 4612 is at Edmonton Radial Railway Society

== CLRVs and ALRVs ==
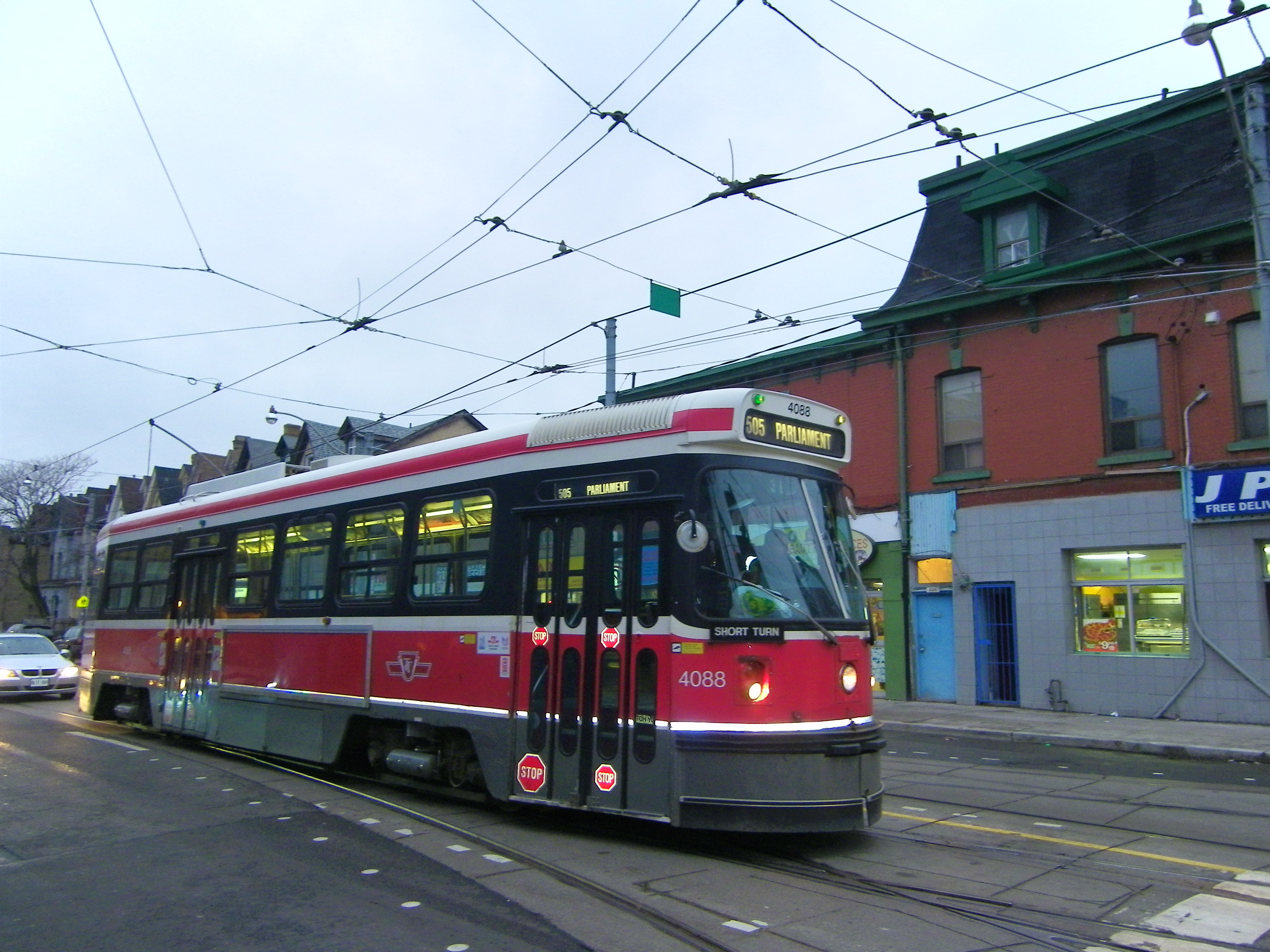
CLRV streetcar

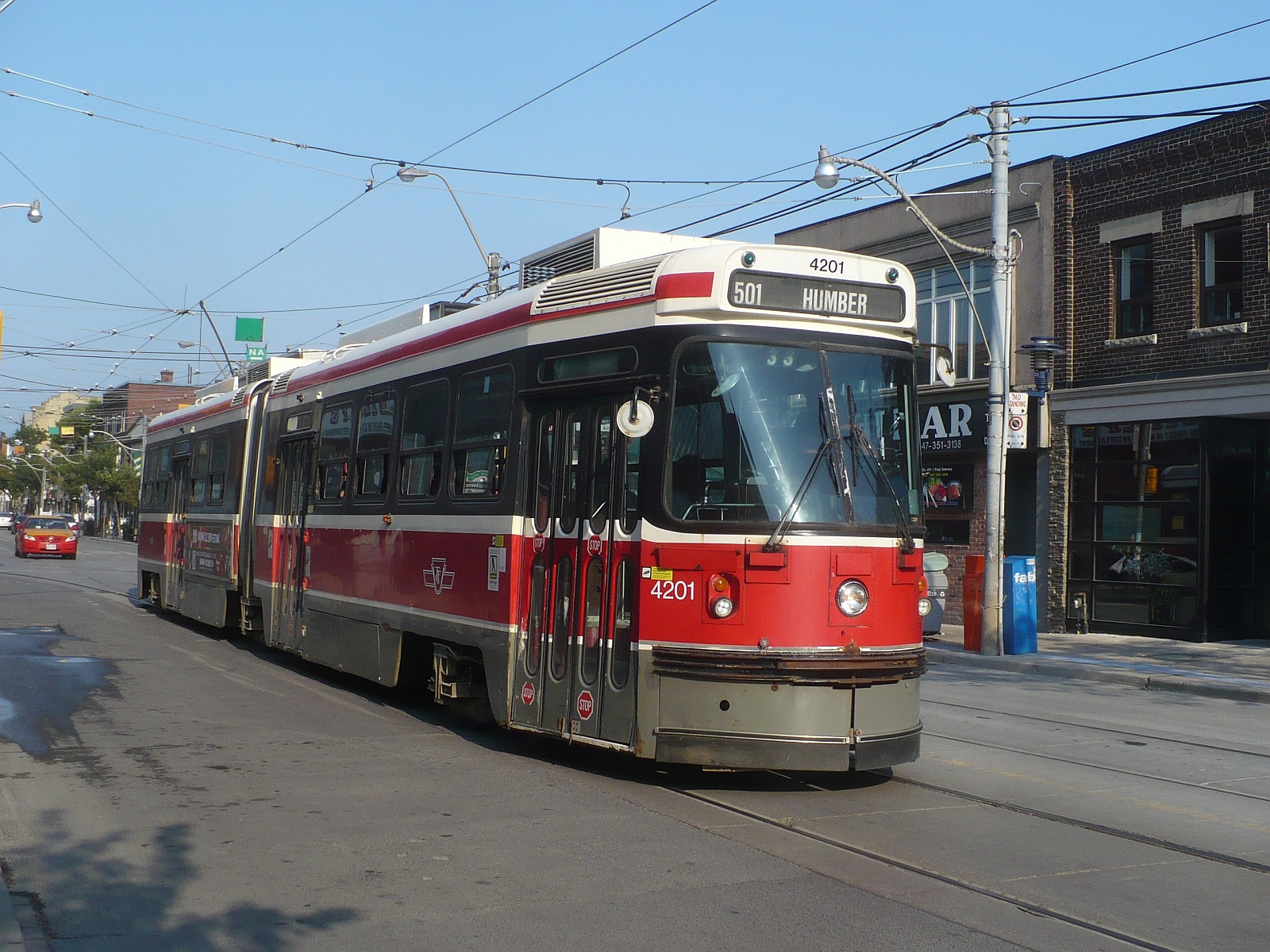
ALRV streetcar

In the 1970s, the Urban Transportation Development Corporation (UTDC), an Ontario Crown corporation developed the Canadian Light Rail Vehicle (CLRV) which would replace the PCC in Toronto. The UTDC hoped to sell CLRVs, or variations of it, to other streetcar and light rail systems in North America. Subsequently, in the 1980s, the UTDC developed the Articulated Light Rail Vehicle (ALRV), the longer, articulated version of the CLRV.

The first six CLRVs (4000–4005, class L1) were built by Schweizerische Industrie Gesellschaft (Swiss Industrial Company, SIG), and were tested in Switzerland serving as prototypes. The remaining 190 CLRVs (4010–4199, class L2) were built by Hawker Siddeley Canada Limited in Thunder Bay. The CLRVs went into revenue service on route 507 Long Branch on September 30, 1979. The vehicles were originally equipped with couplers, but these were removed between 1984 and 1988, and shields were placed over the empty coupler pockets to protect pedestrians from injury.

In August 1982, the UTDC delivered an ALRV prototype, number 4900, which the TTC operated in revenue service for several months. Prototype 4900 had features that were not implemented on either CLRVs or production ALRVs such as hand controls instead of foot controls, and electronic destination signs instead of linen rollsigns. The prototype had couplers while subsequent production units did not. After sitting in storage at the St. Clair Carhouse since early 1983, prototype 4900 was returned to the UTDC's Kingston facility in 1987 where, a year later, it was damaged in a test track collision. It was scrapped in 1997.

ALRV 4200, the first of the 52 production ALRVs (4200–4251, class L3), arrived in Toronto on June 11, 1987; ALRV 4204 began revenue service on route 507 Long Branch on January 19, 1988. Unlike the CLRVs, none of the production ALRVs was equipped with couplers, and shields covered their coupler pockets.

In 2006, CLRV 4041 was modified for air conditioning with a visibly distinctive air conditioning unit installed on its roof. It was a prototype for a proposed refurbishment project that was shelved.

The passage of Accessibility for Ontarians with Disabilities Act in 2005 affected the high-floor CLRV/ALRV fleet because the act mandated all public transport to be fully accessible by 2025. In 2006, TTC staff explored ways to make the old fleet wheelchair-accessible, including constructing and installing wheelchair lifts and attaching wheelchair-accessible trailers, but concluded that these options were impractical, and recommended replacing the old fleet with new low-floor streetcars.

As the CLRV/ALRV fleet aged, its reliability declined. In later years, the propulsion control system became unreliable and difficult to maintain as obsolete electronic and electrical parts became difficult to source. By 2014, the old fleet became vulnerable to extreme cold snaps. On January 3, 2014, this resulted in a breakdown of 50 out of the 195 streetcars required for rush hour service; water vapour had frozen in the pneumatic air lines, preventing brakes and doors from functioning.

During an extreme cold snap between January 20 and 21, 2019, the TTC withdrew all CLRV/ALRV streetcars from service due to the high risk of breakdowns in the cold weather. Streetcar service during this period was provided by the Flexity Outlook streetcars and supplemented by buses.

Starting in 2015, the TTC rebuilt 30 CLRVs and 20 ALRVs to extend their service life because of delays in delivery of the new Flexity Outlook streetcars. The TTC had expected to use some CLRVs and ALRVs to supplement the Flexity Outlook streetcars until 2024 to address increased ridership. However, by November 2018, the ALRV fleet had so deteriorated that only two or three of the 20 refurbished ALRVs were available for service on any one day. The TTC decommissioned all ALRVs by September 2, 2019, and followed suit with the CLRVs on December 29, 2019.

In 2020, the TTC sold CLRV 4187 to a railway enthusiast in an online auction; the vehicle is stripped of all TTC branding to prevent misrepresentation and is being displayed in a private farm in Priceville in Grey Highlands in Grey County, Ontario.

Class	Builder	Description	Fleet numbers	Fleet size	Year(s) acquired	Year(s) retired	Notes
L1	SIG	CLRV	4000–4005	6	1977	2015–2019	Prototypes for the CLRV, built in Switzerland.; 4001 remains in TTC possession for historical use, charters or special events.
L2	Hawker	CLRV	4010–4199	190	1977–1981	2009–2019	Air conditioning added to CLRV 4041 in 2006; 4187 preserved at private farm in Priceville, Ontario
—	Hawker	ALRV	4900	1	1982	1997	ALRV prototype. Tested in Toronto but never owned by TTC.
L3	Hawker	ALRV	4200–4251	52	1987–1988	2015–2019	Longer, articulated version of the CLRV.; One remains in TTC possession for historical use, charters or special events.

== Flexity Outlook ==
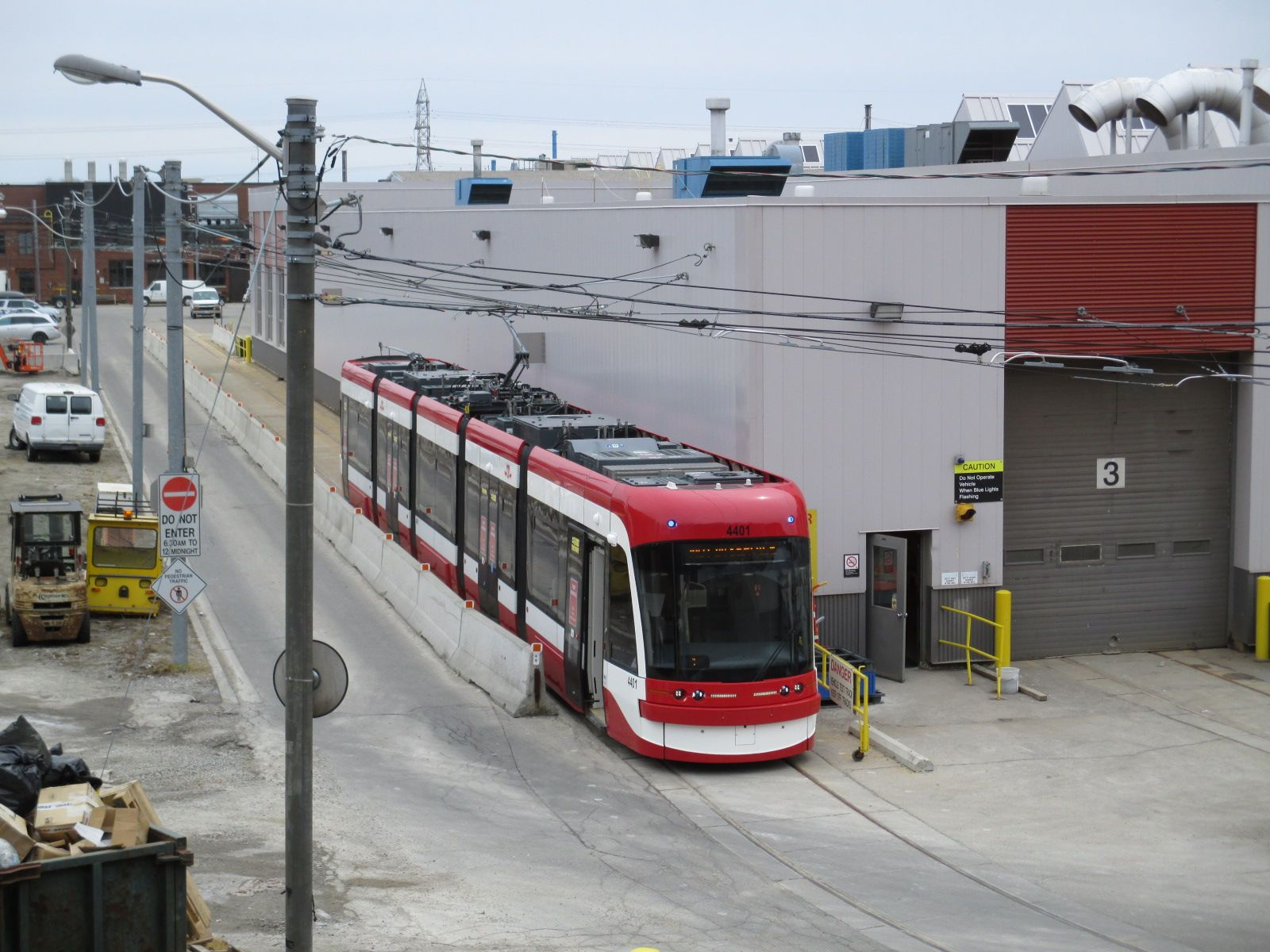
Flexity Outlook prototype with pantograph raised

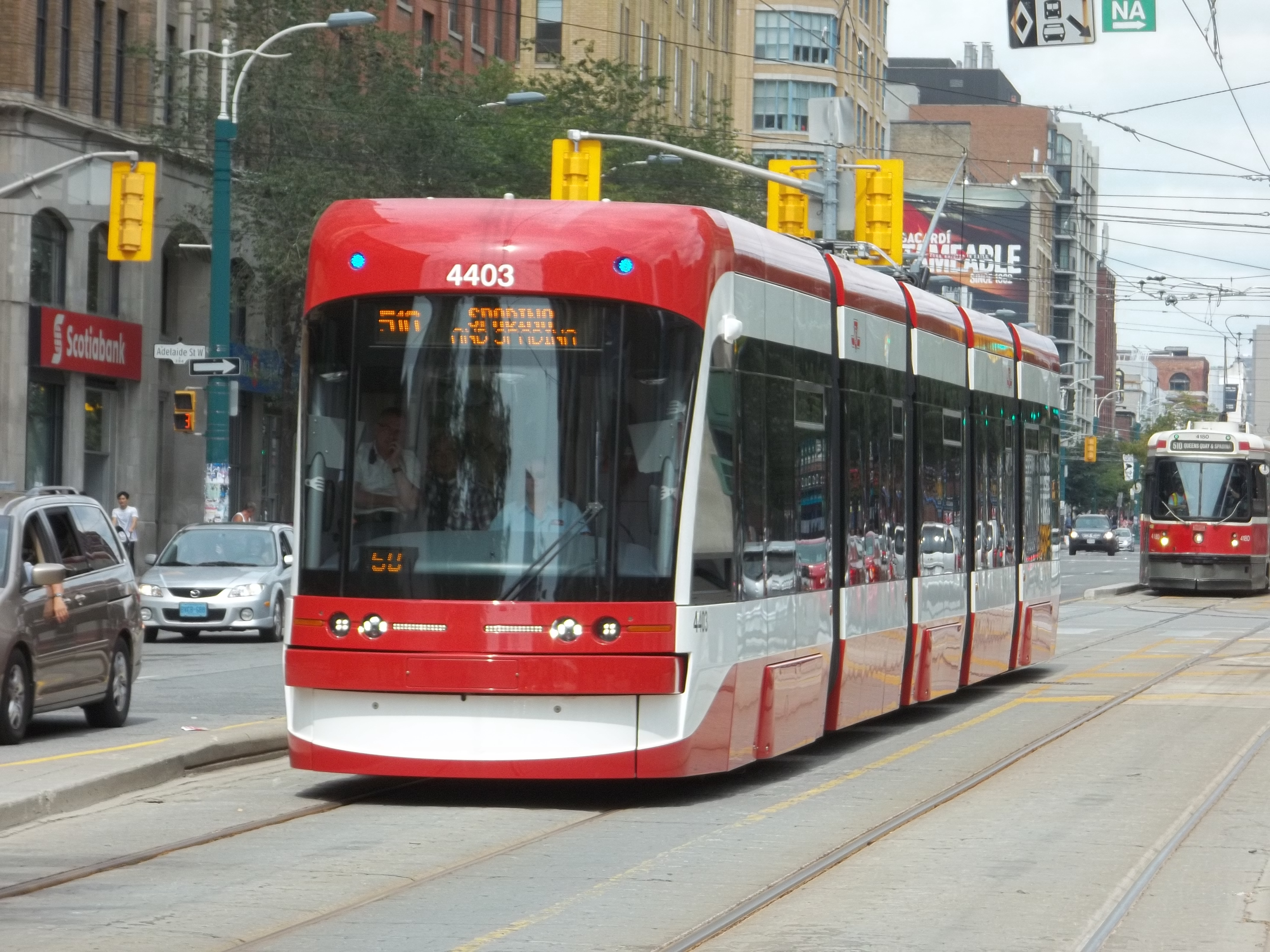
Flexity Outlook on the first route to feature this vehicle type, 510 Spadina

By 2007, as the CLRV/ALRV fleet was nearing the end of its service life and becoming less reliable, the TTC began looking for a manufacturer to build new streetcars. In 2009, the TTC announced that it had chosen a customized version of Bombardier's standard Flexity Outlook as the model to replace the old fleet. The TTC had required Bombardier to modify its Flexity Outlook design to handle the legacy system's trackwork, the standards for which mainly date back to the Peter Witt era of the 1920s. Specifically, Toronto's new streetcar had to navigate single-point switches, a minimum curve radius of 11 metres (36 ft), and a maximum 8 percent grade. Light rail vehicles typically require double-point switches, a 25-metre (82 ft) radius and a maximum 5 percent grade. The minimum radius requirement was the most challenging for Bombardier. The TTC estimated that it would have taken ten years to widen the curve radius throughout the system.

Unlike the CLRV/ALRV, the new vehicles feature a low-floor design, a loading ramp for wheelchair access to be AODA compliant, air-conditioning (only one CLRV, car 4041, had air-conditioning units), a doubling of the passenger capacity, an interior bicycle rack that can hold two standard bicycles, a separated enclosed driver/operator cab walled off from the passenger area, on-board automatic fare vending machines, and electronic destination signs at the front, side and rear of the vehicle (as opposed to roll signs). They were also the first streetcars that had two audible warning signals, featuring both an electronic gong and a horn, as opposed to the CLRVs and ALRVs, which were originally delivered with physical gongs only but had been retrofitted with horns in the late 1990s. The first two Flexity Outlook streetcars entered revenue service on August 31, 2014, on route 510 Spadina.

Each Flexity Outlook streetcar is equipped with both a trolley pole and a pantograph for electrical pickup. (All older streetcars use a trolley pole.) Flexity Outlook streetcars operate with pantographs on routes where the electrical overhead has been converted for pantograph use. The introduction of Flexity Outlook streetcars is leading to the gradual phase-out of the trolley pole on the Toronto streetcar system.

During the manufacture of the Flexity Outlook streetcars, Bombardier experienced manufacturing and quality control problems mainly with welding at one of its plants. This resulted in major delivery delays, in that by the end of 2017, only 59 streetcars were delivered when about 150 were expected. In addition, in 2018, Bombardier requested the gradual recall of 67 vehicles to correct welding problems. With the delivery problems, and the retirement of many CLRV/ALRV streetcars too worn out to repair, a streetcar shortage occurred resulting in temporary bus replacements along some streetcar routes. Bombardier expects to return all recalled Flexity Outlook streetcars by 2023. On October 31, 2018, Bombardier was expected to deliver the remainder of the 204-vehicle order by the end of 2019.

On January 24, 2020, the TTC took delivery of the last of 204 Flexity Outlook streetcars ordered from Bombardier. Streetcar 4603 was delivered by rail to the Hillcrest Complex from Bombardier's Thunder Bay plant. The last streetcar was slightly over three weeks late, as Bombardier had promised to deliver the last car by the end of 2019.

The TTC ordered 60 additional Flexity Outlook streetcars from Bombardier Transportation's successor Alstom in late 2023 that were built at the former Bombardier facility in Thunder Bay and fully delivered by December 2025.

Builder	Fleet numbers	Fleet size	Year(s) acquired	Notes
Bombardier	4400–4603	204	2012–2020	4400–4402 were prototypes for testing requiring modification for TTC acceptance.
Alstom	4604–4663	60	2024–2025	4663 was in service in December 2025.

== Work cars ==
Excluding rubber-tire vehicles with extendable rail wheels, the Toronto streetcar system no longer has any rail-based work vehicles after the 1990s. The last such vehicles, rail grinding cars W-30 and W-31, were retired in 2002, their last assignment being in 1999. Except for rail grinders, all other types of work vehicles were retired before 1980. CLRVs 4089 and 4124, retired in 2019, are being reserved for future role as work cars.

Work cars had specialized duties. Besides rail grinding, there were work vehicles for snow clearing, construction (cranes, dump cars and flat cars) and deliveries for carhouses (e.g. sand cars, fare box cars). All these cars were self-propelled, taking power from the streetcar overhead wire. Some work cars—such as dump cars, track plows and snow sweepers—were purchased from outside rail equipment manufacturers. In some cases, the TTC inherited a car built in the shops of its predecessor, the Toronto Railway Company—for example, crane C-1 and the fare box car (for hauling tickets and fare boxes between carhouses and head office). In many cases, cars such as rail grinders and snow scrapers were former passenger streetcars that the TTC converted to work cars. Old cars used for such conversions were usually inherited from the Toronto Railway Company and the Toronto Civic Railways. However, in one case, the TTC used a pair of PCCs to create rail grinding cars W-30 and W-31.

Rail-based, snow-clearing cars were retired in the 1970s when City of Toronto Public Works department trucks took over that function. To clear light snow, the TTC purchased 12 snow sweepers in 1940 from the Third Avenue Railway System (TARS) of New York City and numbered them S-30 to S-41. These cars were built by Russell Car Company in 1920–1921 and were double-truck, double-end vehicles. The TTC scrapped two of the sweepers in 1966; the remainder remained active until 1971 and were retired in 1972. After retirement, one sweeper was sold to a transit operator in New Jersey. For heavier snowfall, the TTC acquired two snow plows, TP-10 and TP-11, from National Steel Car. Both cars are preserved at museums.

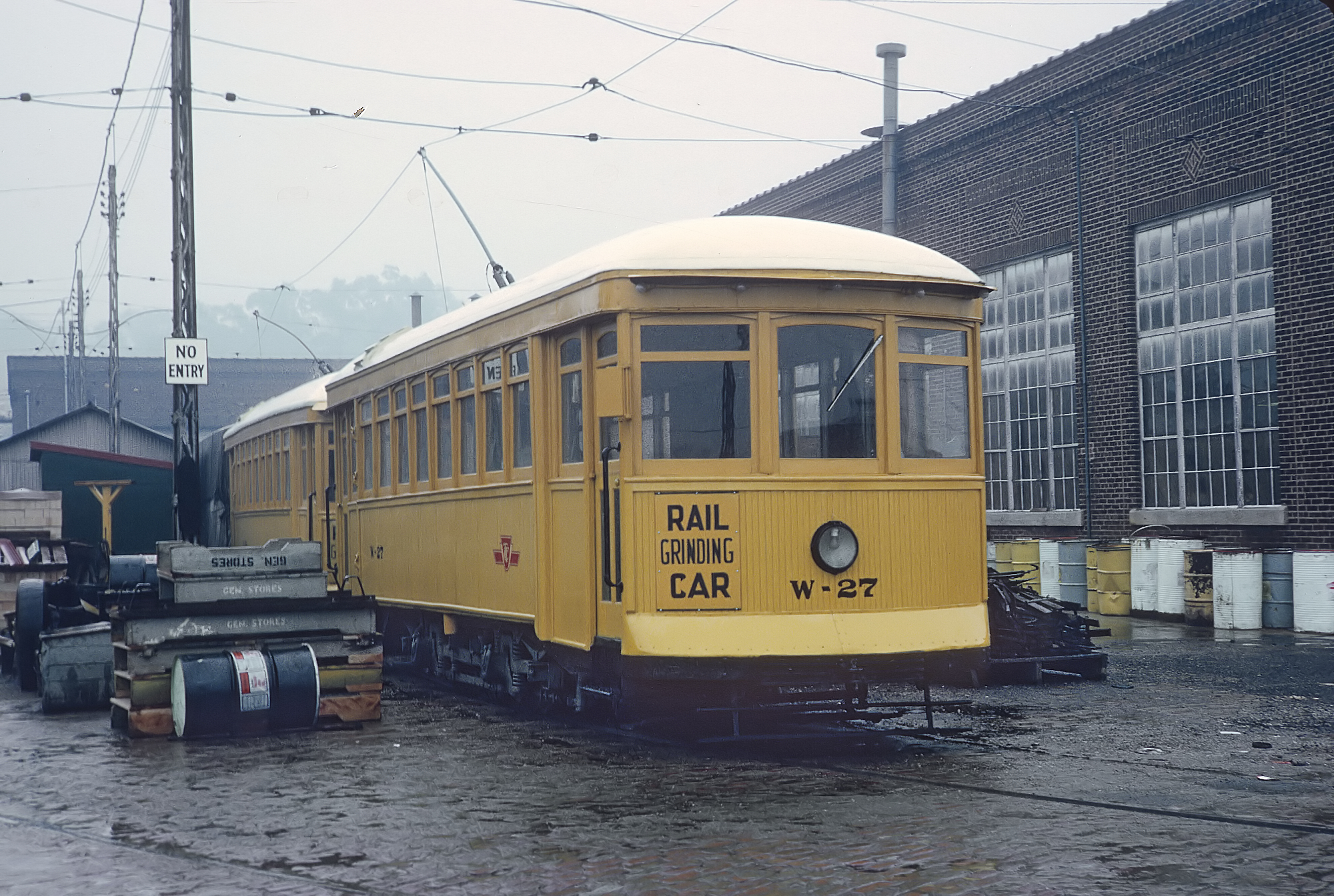
W-27 rail grinding car, 1965

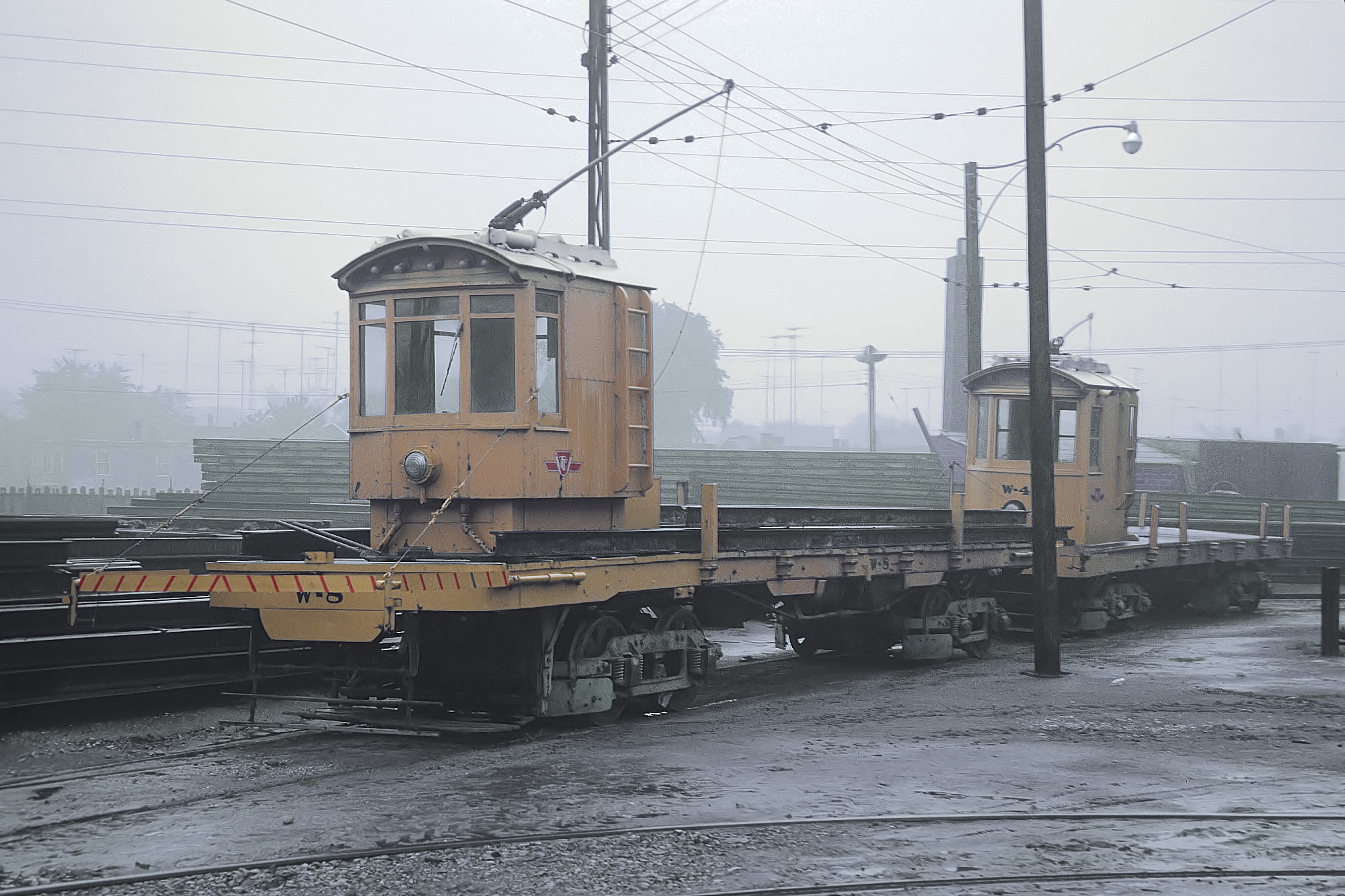
W-8 & W-4 construction cars, 1965

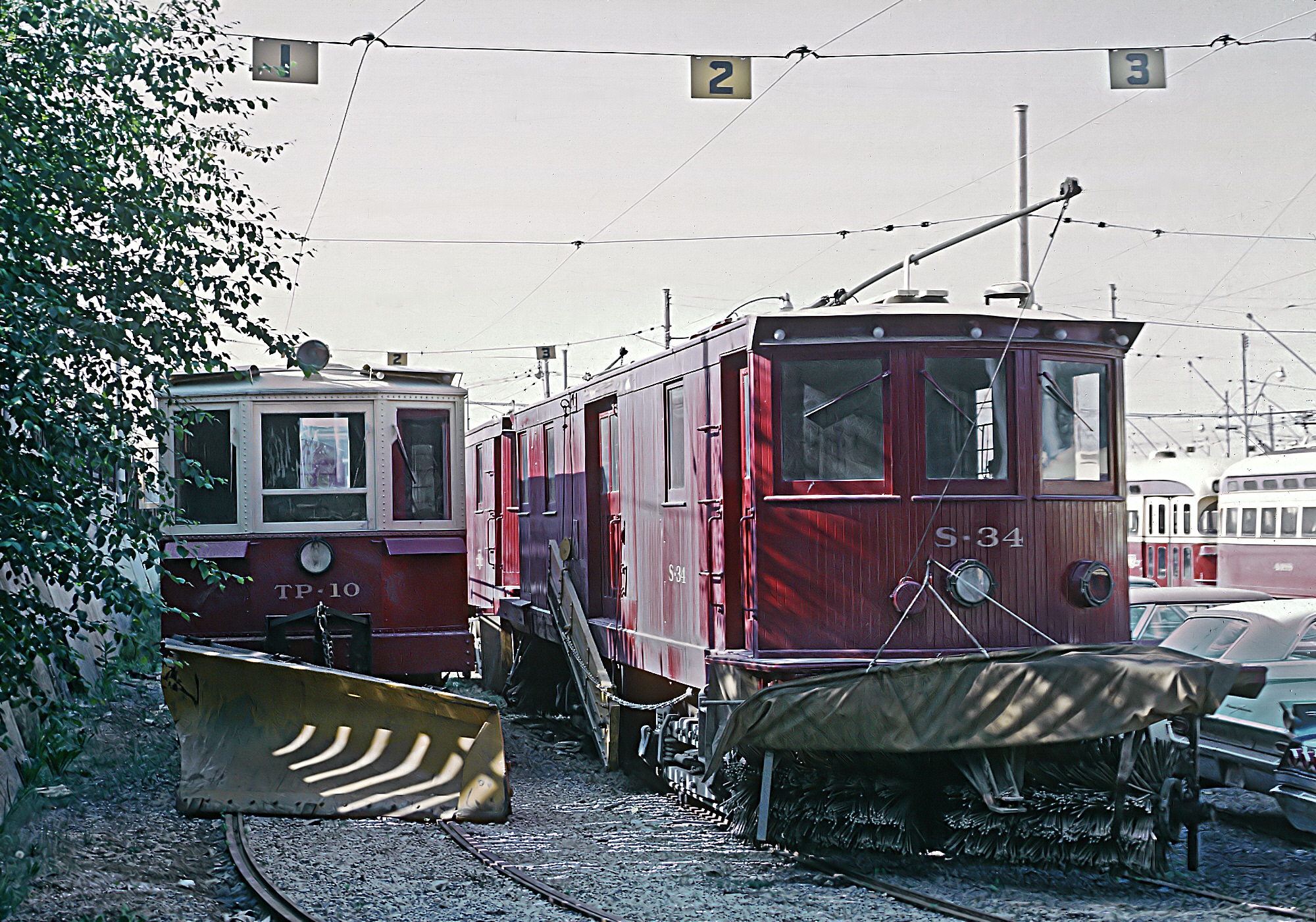
TP-10 track plow (left) & S-34 Russell snow sweeper, 1966

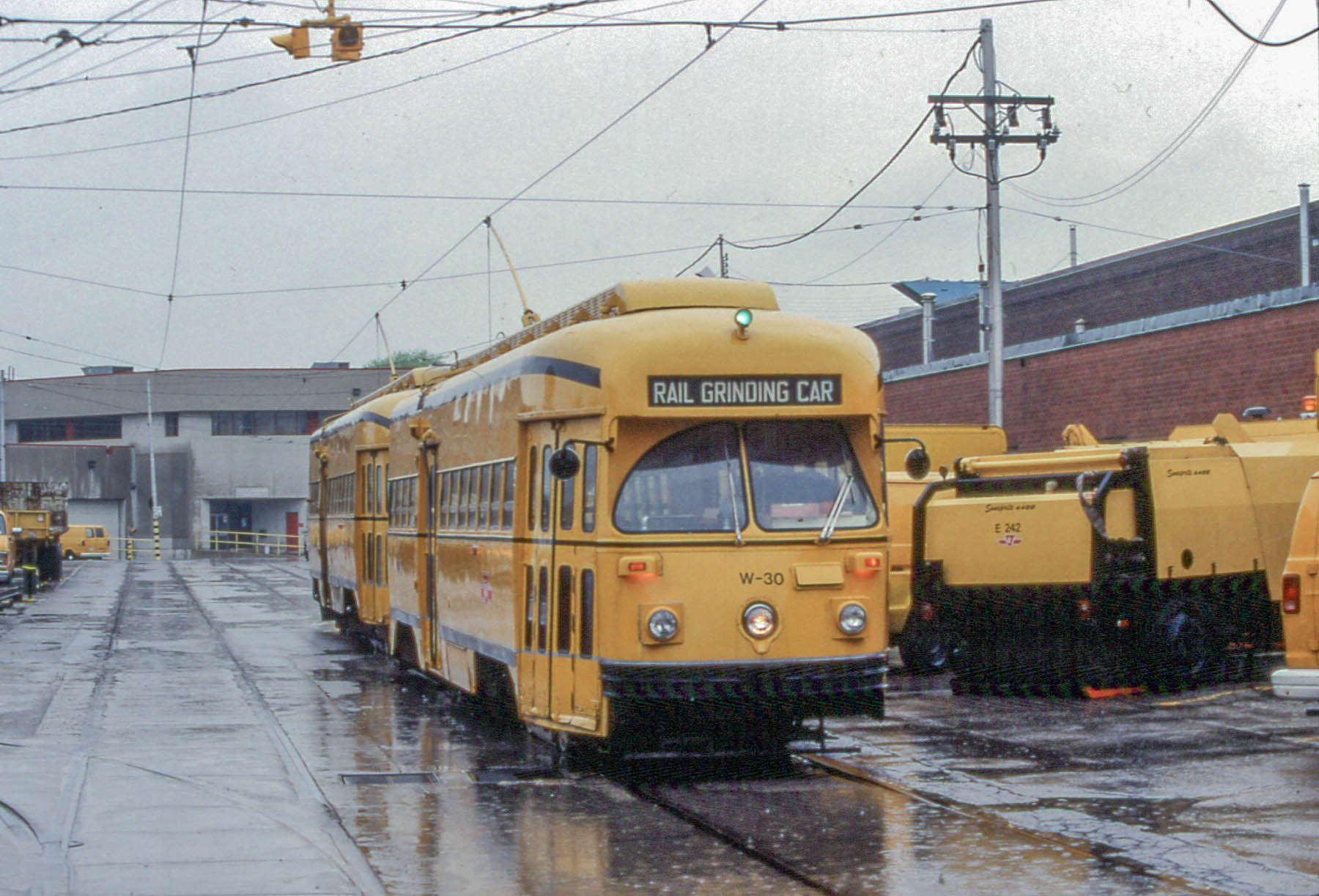
W-30 & W-31 rail grinding cars, 1995

The following table lists work cars preserved at museums, a few of which are pictured above:

Car number	Car type	Builder	Year built	Year retired	Notes
C-1	crane	TRC	1911	1968	Preserved at Halton County Radial Railway, Milton, Ontario
C-2	crane	TTC	1921	1971	Preserved at Ohio Railway Museum, Worthington, Ohio
S-36	snow sweeper	Russell	1920	1973	Acquired by TTC in 1948; ex–Third Avenue Railway System, ex–Eastern Massachusetts Street Railway; Preserved at Shore Line Trolley Museum, East Haven, Connecticut
S-37	snow sweeper	Russell	1920	1973	Acquired by TTC in 1948; ex–Third Avenue Railway System, ex–Eastern Massachusetts Street Railway; Preserved at Halton County Railway Museum
TP-10	snow plow	National	1945	late 1970s	Preserved at Canadian Railway Museum, Saint-Constant, Quebec
TP-11	snow plow	National	1945	late 1970s	Preserved at Halton County Railway Museum
W-3	flat motor	TTC	1922	1966	Originally built as snow scraper W-9 in 1922, converted to plow W-3 in 1942, converted to flat motor in 1966; Preserved at Shore Line Trolley Museum
W-4	flat motor	TRC	1904	1972	Preserved at Halton County Radial Railway
W-28	rail grinder	TTC	1954	1976	Converted from TTC 2214, ex-TCR 57; Preserved at Halton County Radial Railway
W-30 & W-31	rail grinder	TTC	1976	1999	Former A11-class PCC streetcars Preserved at Halton County Radial Railway

== See also ==
- Toronto-gauge railways
- Alstom Citadis, another light rail vehicle model used in Toronto, using standard gauge and operating on Line 6
- Flexity Freedom, another light rail vehicle model used in Toronto, using standard gauge and operating on Line 5
