= Toronto Transit Commission fleet =

Toronto Transit Commission fleet could refer to one of several fleets of public transport vehicles used by the Toronto Transit Commission (TTC):

- Toronto Transit Commission bus system § Vehicles
  - Wheel-Trans § Fleet, the fleet of the TTC's paratransit service
- Toronto streetcar system rolling stock
- Toronto subway rolling stock
