= Spadina streetcar line =

Spadina streetcar line may refer to:

- Spadina streetcar line (1923–48), a streetcar line on Spadina Avenue in Toronto, Canada
- 510 Spadina, a modern streetcar system in Toronto, Canada, completed in 1997

== See also ==
- Spadina (disambiguation)
