= Spadina =

Spadina, originating from the Ojibwa word ishpadinaa meaning "high place/ridge", may refer to:

== Toronto, Ontario, Canada ==
- Spadina House, a mansion and museum
- Spadina Hotel (built 1873), a historic building
- Spadina Avenue, a major street
- Spadina Expressway, a partially completed highway
- Spadina streetcar line (1923–48)
- 510 Spadina, a streetcar route
- Yonge-University-Spadina Line (TTC), the Spadina line; a subway line
- Spadina (TTC), a subway station on the Yonge-University Spadina and Bloor-Danforth lines
- Spadina–Front GO Station, a.k.a. Spadina (GO), a commuter rail station
- CNR Spadina Roundhouse, a railroad roundhouse
- Spadina (electoral district) (1935–1988), a federal electoral district
- Trinity—Spadina, a federal electoral district (1988–2015)
- Trinity—Spadina (provincial electoral district), a provincial electoral district (since 1999)
- Spadina—Fort York, a federal (since 2012) electoral district
- Spadina—Fort York (provincial electoral district)

== Other uses ==
- Spadina Crescent Bridge (Saskatoon), Saskatchewan, Canada

== See also ==
- Ishpatina Ridge, Ontario's highest point and shares the same etymology as Spadina
- 1 Spadina Crescent (University of Toronto), Toronto, Ontario, Canada
- Spadina streetcar line (disambiguation)
