= Toronto Civic Railways =

Streetcar operator in Toronto, Canada, from 1912 to 1921

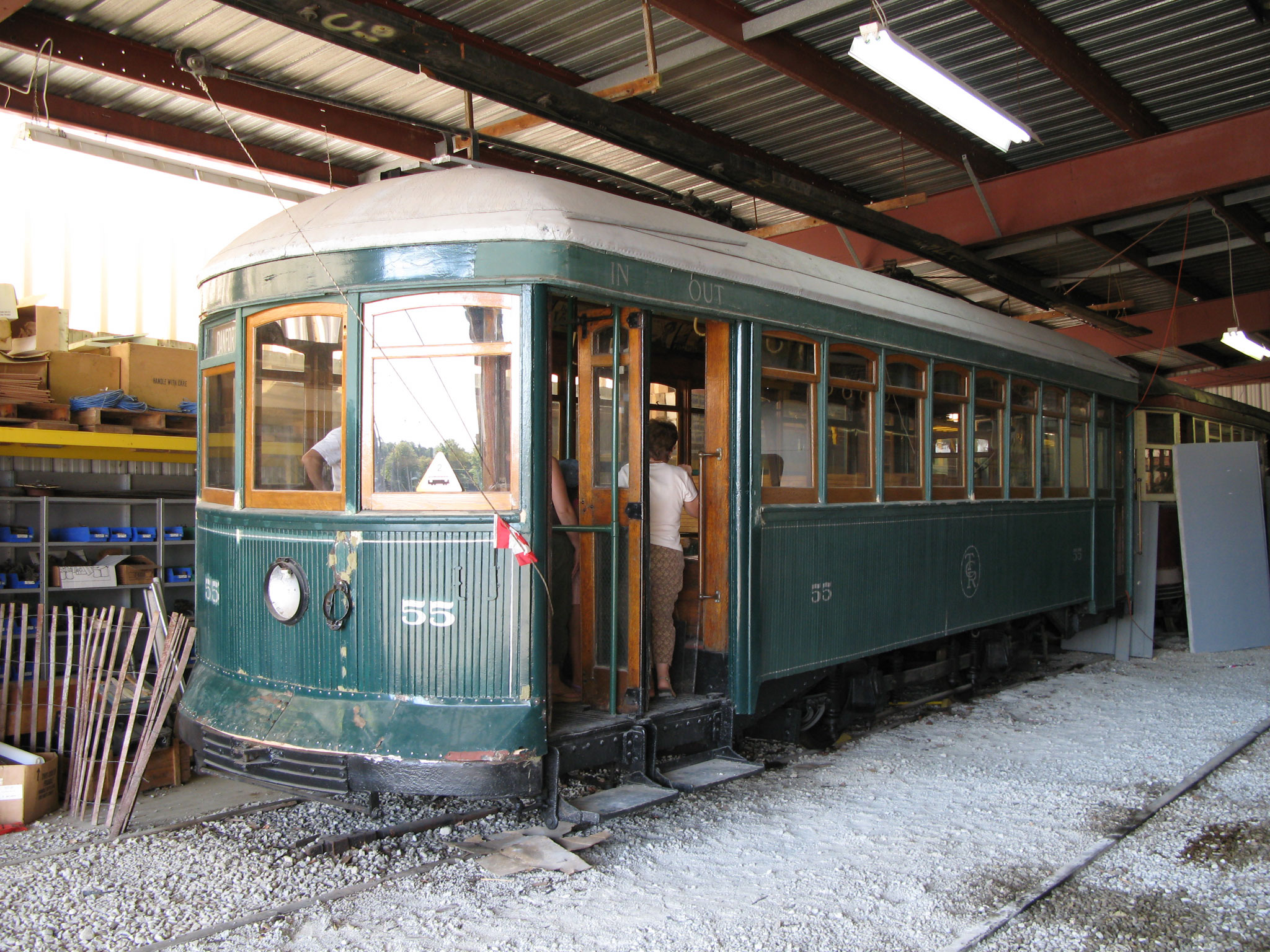
- Toronto Civic Railways Preston-built car 55 is preserved at the Halton County Radial Railway museum.

Overview
- Headquarters: Toronto
- Locale: new areas annexed to Toronto after 1880s to 1910s
- Dates of operation: 1912–1921
- Predecessor: None – new lines not served by Toronto Railway Company
- Successor: Toronto Transportation Commission

Technical
- Track gauge: 4 ft 10 7/8 in (1,495 mm) Toronto gauge
- Length: 36 km (22.4 mi)

Toronto Civic Railways (TCR) was a streetcar operator created and owned by the City of Toronto, Ontario, Canada, to serve newly annexed areas of the city that the private operator Toronto Railway Company refused to serve. When the Toronto Railway Company's franchise expired in 1921, its services were combined with those of the Toronto Civic Railways, and are now assumed by the new Toronto Transportation Commission (TTC). The first route of the TCR started operation on December 18, 1912.

== Overview ==
When the City of Toronto granted the Toronto Railway Company a franchise in 1891 to operate the streetcar system in Toronto, the City had the right to require the TRC to build new streetcar lines within the city limits. Later, the City annexed several neighbouring districts expanding the city limits, and ordered the TRC to extend streetcar service to them. The TRC refused saying the franchise agreement required the TRC only to provide streetcar service within the city limits as they existed in 1891. The City took the TRC to court which ruled in the TRC's favour. Thus, the City created the Toronto Civic Railways to serve the newly annexed districts. The TCR was not a separate entity or agency but operated under the City's Department of Works, Railway and Bridge Section.

TCR lines had three divisions clustered in each of the west end, east end and mid-town; the three divisions were not interconnected nor did they have any permanent connection to the TRC network. To move streetcars between TCR carhouses, temporary track connections had to be made to a nearby TRC line. Thus, the need to use TRC tracks for movements between TCR carhouses was one reason the City chose Toronto gauge for the TCR. The other reason was that when the TRC franchise ended in 1921, the City wanted to merge the two systems.

== Routes ==
The Toronto Civic Railways had five routes grouped into 3 operating divisions, with each division operating out of its namesake carhouse. The Gerrard route initially operated out of the Gerrard Street Carhouse until the Danforth Carhouse became available.

Route details
Division	Route	Opened	Description	Length
Danforth	Gerrard	December 18, 1912	Gerrard Street from Greenwood Avenue east to Main Street	2.9 kilometres (1.8 mi)
Danforth	Danforth	October 30, 1913	Danforth Avenue from Broadview east to the then–city limits at Luttrell Avenue	5.4 kilometres (3.4 mi)
St. Clair	St. Clair	August 25, 1913	St. Clair Avenue West from Yonge Street west to Lansdowne Avenue	5 kilometres (3.1 mi)
St. Clair	Lansdowne	January 16, 1917	Lansdowne Avenue from St. Clair Street West south to the north side of the CPR midtown line	1 kilometre (0.6 mi)
Bloor West	Bloor West	February 23, 1915	Bloor Street West from Dundas Street West west to Quebec Avenue and later to Runnymede Road	2 kilometres (1.2 mi)

=== Gerrard ===
Opening on December 18, 1912, the Gerrard line was the first TCR line in operation. It was built along Gerrard Street between Greenwood Avenue and Main Street, and was effectively an extension of the TRC's streetcar line running east on Gerrard Street from Parliament Street. The TRC and TCR tracks were not connected and passengers had to change streetcars at Greenwood Avenue and pay another fare. At Main Street, passengers could connect with the Little York branch of Toronto and York Radial Railway's Scarboro division which would take them to Kingston Road. However, many passengers found the new Gerrard line to be more convenient than the Little York branch, and the latter closed in 1913. The Gerrard line had crossovers at the end stops plus another on Coxwell Avenue just south of upper Gerrard street. Gerrard streetcars operated out of the Gerrard Carhouse until the completion of the Danforth Carhouse in September 1915. After the TTC took over in 1921, the TRC and TCR tracks were joined at Greenwood Avenue. Today, the TCR Gerrard route is now served by the 506 Carlton streetcar route.

In 1913, the TCR completed a single-track line on Coxwell Avenue between upper Gerrard Street and Danforth Avenue. This gave permanent access to the Hanson Yard (where the TCR received new streetcars by rail) and connected to the new Danforth line and Danforth Carhouse. The TCR did not operate passenger service on the Coxwell line. After the TTC took over the TCR in 1921, it double-tracked the line and extended it south to Queen Street. The TTC's Coxwell streetcar route operated until 1966 when it was replaced by the 22 Coxwell bus.

=== Danforth ===
The Danforth line opened on October 30, 1913 after 14 months of construction. It ran along Danforth Avenue to the then-city limits at Luttrell Avenue. Its only connection to another streetcar line was at Broadview Avenue to allow transfers to the TRC's Broadview route. The line had crossovers at each end of the line plus one each at Greenwood Avenue and Coxwell Avenue. Some Danforth streetcars regularly short-turned at Greenwood Avenue returning to Broadview Avenue. Streetcars for the line came into service via Coxwell Avenue from the Hanson Yard and the Gerrard Carhouse until September 1915, when the Danforth Carhouse was completed. On October 2, 1921, the TTC merged the Danforth route into the Broadview route and placed Peter Witt cars on the route. On July 1, 1923, a new, crosstown Bloor streetcar line serving both Bloor Street and Danforth Avenue was opened. In 1966, the Bloor–Danforth subway opened (today Line 2 Bloor–Danforth) replacing streetcar service on the Danforth except for the portion between Woodbine station and the Luttrell Loop which was replaced by a subway extension on May 10, 1968.

=== St. Clair ===
Construction of the St. Clair line began in 1911, and had a few challenges. St. Clair Avenue was a rough, undulating road requiring much cut and fill, and the Nordheimer Ravine had to be bridged. After completion of a temporary bridge carrying a gauntlet track over the ravine, service began on August 25, 1913 between Yonge Street and Station Street (at today's Caledonia Road). The permanent bridge was completed on June 20, 1914. The TCR had a temporary streetcar storage yard at Station Street which it used until December 31, 1913, when the St. Clair Carhouse at Beacondale Avenue (today Wychwood Avenue) became available. Tracks were located in a centre reservation free of road traffic. There were crossovers at each end of the line plus another at Beacondale Avenue. At Yonge Street, passengers could connect with the Metropolitan line of the Toronto and York Radial Railway which ran from the Canadian Pacific Railway's midtown line to Sutton near Lake Simcoe. At Avenue Road, passengers could transfer to the TRC's Avenue Road route. In 1917, passengers could also transfer to the TCR's new Lansdowne route at Lansdowne Avenue; this was a free transfer for passengers to and from the St. Clair line. After its creation in 1921, the TTC connected the TCR and TRC lines at Avenue Road, expanded the St. Clair route both east and west, and added more streetcar routes to connect with the St. Clair line. By the 1930s, the centre reservation was removed putting streetcars in mixed traffic. The TCR St. Clair route is now served by today's 512 St. Clair streetcar route, and the centre reservation was restored along the entire route in 2010.

=== Lansdowne ===
The Lansdowne route ran on Lansdowne Avenue between St. Clair Street West and the Canadian Pacific Railway midtown line north of Royce Avenue (today Dupont Street). The double-track line connected with St. Clair streetcars at the north end, the Davenport line of the Toronto Suburban Railway at Davenport Road and with the TRC's Lansdowne route if passengers walked across the CPR tracks. Service began on January 16, 1917. The TCR line was on an 8% grade just north of its crossing with the Davenport line, a single-track, standard-gauge radial line. As a safety precaution, the crossing was protected by semaphore signals and derails on the southbound TCR track as well as along the TSR line on both sides of the crossing. The procedure required the conductor to set the signals and derails every time a TCR streetcar passed through the crossing. Thus, two-man crews were required on this route until 1933 by which time the southbound derail had been removed. On May 29, 1931, the Lansdowne Loop was opened at St. Clair Avenue so that Lansdowne streetcars could reverse off-street. On July 5, 1931, the route (now called Lansdowne North) was extended via a new underpass under the CPR tracks to Royce Avenue (today Dupont Street). On April 3, 1933, the Lansdowne North and Lansdowne South routes were combined and terminated at College Street at the south end. On June 19, 1947, the Lansdowne streetcar line was replaced by a trolleybus route.

=== Bloor West ===
The Bloor West line was completed in two stages along Bloor Street west of Dundas Street. Its construction started in 1914, and the first stage required filling in a ravine at Keele Street. On February 23, 1915, a temporary single-track line was opened to Quebec Avenue. The line was laid on the north side of the road with a passing siding east of Keele Street. By December 1915, a permanent double-track line was completed in the middle of Bloor Street. Construction west of Quebec Avenue began in 1915 to fill a large ravine west of Quebec Avenue by dumping earth from a long wooden trestle. Service from Quebec Avenue to the western terminal at Runnymede Road started on November 12, 1917 again using a temporary single-track line. The western section of the line was double-tracked for service on October 20, 1920. The finished line had a cross-over at Quebec Avenue as well as at each endpoint of the line. The Bloor West Carhouse was located near Indian Road on the north side of Bloor Street. In 1921, the TTC extended the line west to Jane Street opening on October 9, 1921. In 1923, the isolated Bloor West line was attached to the rest of the streetcar system. Bloor West would be served by the Bloor streetcar line until 1966 when it was replaced by the Bloor–Danforth subway. A remnant of the Bloor West line remained operating west from Keele station to Jane Street until May 10, 1968 when it was replaced by a subway extension.

== Facilities ==
The TTC inherited all TCR facilities except the Station Street Yard. Only two carhouses survive today and have been repurposed for other uses.

Facility details
Yard	Location	Opened	Closed	Notes
Hanson Street Yard	Hanson St and Coxwell Ave, SW corner	1911	1924	The yard was first used a base for construction activity and later to receive new TCR streetcars by rail. It stored TCR streetcars for service until the Danforth Carhouse opened. After the TTC took over the TCR, the yard stored retired streetcars, and continued to handle receipts of bulk supplies until the Hillcrest Complex opened. The TTC sold the yard in 1934. Site became Monarch Park Collegiate Institute in 1964.
Gerrard Carhouse	Gerrard St E near Morton Rd (later Kildonan Rd), NW corner	1912	1915	This was the first TCR carhouse but closed after the Danforth Carhouse opened. Today, two houses stand on the site.
Danforth Carhouse	Danforth Ave and Coxwell Ave, SE corner	1915		The carhouse served both the TCR Gerrard and Danforth routes. The TTC expanded the carhouse to handle about 15 streetcar routes. The carhouse closed in 1966, and was used to store retired PCC streetcars. In 1967, the site was converted into a bus garage which closed in 2002. Still used by TTC.
Station Street Yard	Station St (Caledonia Rd) and St. Clair Ave W, SW corner	1911	1913	The yard was an outdoor storage facility next to a railway line. It received new streetcars and stored them for the St. Clair route until the St. Clair Carhouse opened. Now site of commercial building.
St. Clair Carhouse	Benson Ave and Bracondale Ave (now Wychwood Ave), SW corner	1913	1991	The carhouse was expanded in 1916 and 1921, and closed as a carhouse in 1978. The site was then used to store newly received CLRVs and ALRVs and PCCs to be scrapped. The site was sold to City in 1996 after which carhouse building became the Wychwood Barns, an arts and culture centre.
Bloor West Carhouse	Bloor St W at Indian Rd, NE corner	1915	1923	When the Bloor West line was connected to rest of the streetcar system in 1923, the TTC closed the carhouse. Today, a multi-story building stands on the site, backing onto the subway line between today's Keele station and the Keele Yard.

== Fleet ==
All TCR streetcars were closed double-ended electric vehicles. When the TTC took over the TCR, it renamed the TCR class designations, and renumbered the streetcars with even numbered only. Note that TCR class F is not the same as TTC class F in the following table, but class G is the same for both the TCR and TTC. The year retired column refers to retirement from TTC passenger service in Toronto; it excludes the retirement of cars converted for work service (snow scrapers, rail grinders) or sold to other operators. For more information on the TCR streetcars after the TTC acquired them, see: Toronto streetcar system rolling stock § Ex-TCR streetcars.

Fleet
Manufacturer	Description	Fleet size	Year acquired	TCR class	TCR numbers	TTC class	TTC numbers	Year retired	Notes
McGuire-Cummings Manufacturing Company (Paris, Illinois)	Wood double-end double-truck two-man closed electric streetcar for Gerrard route	4	1912	A	1–4 later 120–123	I	2020–2026	1933	(Note: Originally numbered 1–4, the TCR class A cars were rebuilt in May 1916 and renumbered 120–123.)
Niles Car and Manufacturing Company (Niles, Ohio)	Wood double-end double-truck two-man closed electric streetcar	20	1913	B & C	100–119	H	2128–2166	1933,1948	(Note: The Niles cars were all originally TCR class B, equipped with General Electric motors. In 1915, cars 107–112 received Westinghouse motors and became TCR class C.) (Note: The TTC would retire 4 Class H cars in 1933 and the remainder in 1948.)
Preston Car Company (Preston, Ontario)	Wood double-end single-truck two-man closed electric streetcar	8	1915–1917	D & E	50–57	F	2200–2214	1926	(Note: TCR classes D & E were similar varying in minor features such as type of fenders. Cars 50–52,57 were in class D and 53–56 in class E.) (Note: Some TTC class F vehicles would be converted into snow scrapers, rail grinders for the streetcar system, and into grinders for subway service.)
Preston Car Company (Preston, Ontario)	Steel, arch-roof, double-end double-truck two-man closed electric streetcar	13	1918	F	200–212	J	2168–2194	1949	(Note: The TTC would use its class J streetcars on the Weston and Spadina routes, and on streetcar shuttle services.)
J.G. Brill and Company (Philadelphia, PA)	Birney: steel, double-end single-truck one-man closed streetcar	25	1920	G	60–84	G	2216–2264	1927, 1940–1941	(Note: The cars were built in Preston, Ontario by Preston Car Company, which was acquired in 1921 by J.G. Brill. The TTC would sell class G streetcars to other cities: 3 to Cornwall (1926), 8 to Halifax (1927) and final 14 to Halifax (1940–1941).)

== See also ==
- Toronto Transit Commission
- List of Ontario railways

== Notes ==
Preceded by Toronto Railway Company	Public Transit in Toronto; 1915–1921	Succeeded by Toronto Transportation Commission
