= Birney (Toronto streetcar) =

Toronto streetcar model circa 1920

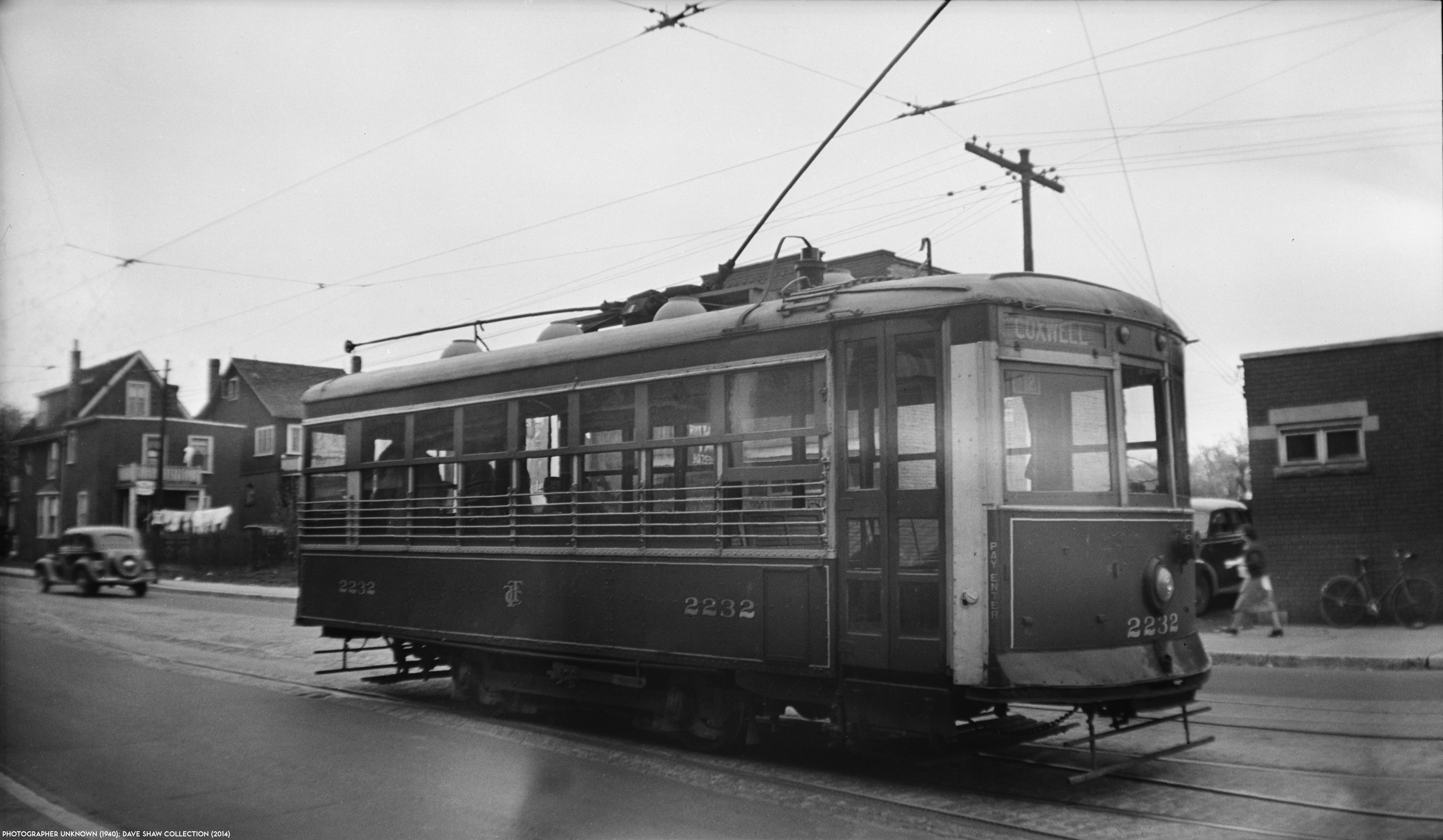
A double-ended Birney streetcar, on Coxwell, in 1940

In 1920, the Toronto Civic Railways (TCR) acquired 25 single-truck, double-ended Birney streetcars from the J. G. Brill Company. In 1921, the Toronto Transportation Commission (TTC) acquired all assets of the TCR including the 25 Birney cars. In 1927, the TTC sold 3 of the Birney cars to Cornwall, Ontario and 8 to Halifax, Nova Scotia. In 1941, the remaining 14 Birney cars were sold, again going to Halifax.

The Birney cars were the TCR's first cars that could be operated by a single person. Normally, they could seat 28 passengers with a provision for 32 using folding seats.

== History ==
Starting in mid-1920, the TCR operated the Birney cars on three of its routes:

- Gerrard
- Bloor
- Danforth

Under the TTC, the Birney cars operated on various routes such as:

- Bloor West: Formerly the TCR Bloor route, it was replaced in August 1925 by an extension of the Bloor streetcar line, which used single-ended cars.
- Parliament: Birney cars served this route from July 1923 to May 1940 when they were replaced by single-ended cars.
- Coxwell: Birney cars began service on this route in October 1921. They were replaced by single-ended cars in June 1940 after the construction of a loop at Coxwell Avenue and Queen Street.
- Davenport: In November 1923, Birney cars started service along a route that was part of the Toronto Suburban Railway's Davenport route. The line was replaced by buses in December 1940.

In 1927, the TTC declared 11 of the Birney cars to be surplus. In that year, three cars were sold to the Cornwall Street Railway Light and Power Company in Cornwall, Ontario, and eight were sold to the Nova Scotia Tramways and Power Company in Halifax, Nova Scotia. The three Cornwall streetcars became CSR cars 16, 18 and 20), and the eight Halifax cars became cars 138–145.

In 1940 and 1941, the remaining fourteen Birney cars were sold to the Nova Scotia Light and Power Company, Limited (successor of Nova Scotia Tramways and Power Company) becoming cars 159–172 in Halifax.

All Birney cars were scrapped circa 1949 as Cornwall and Halifax were terminating streetcar service.

== Specifications ==
- Class: G (TCR/TTC)
- Car manufacturer: J. G. Brill Company (Preston, Ontario, plant was operated as Preston Car Company, which Brill would acquire the following year in 1921.)
- Years of manufacture: August 1920
- Fleet no.: TCR 60–84; renumbered by TTC in May 1923 as 2216–2264, even numbers only.
- Fleet size: 25
- Length: 28 ft 0 1/2 in (8.55 m)
- Weight: 17,080 lb (7,750 kg)
- Seating: 32 (standing 52)
- Motor (motor car only): single truck (two Wheelsets)
- Track gauge: 4 ft 10 7/8 in (1,495 mm) (TCR/TTC)
