= McGuire-Cummings Manufacturing Company =

American railway equipment company

- Company type: Privately held company
- Industry: Rail transportation
- Founded: 1888
- Defunct: 1943
- Headquarters: Chicago, Illinois, United States
- Number of locations: 2
- Area served: Worldwide
- Products: Streetcars (trams); snowplow cars; trucks; electric locomotives

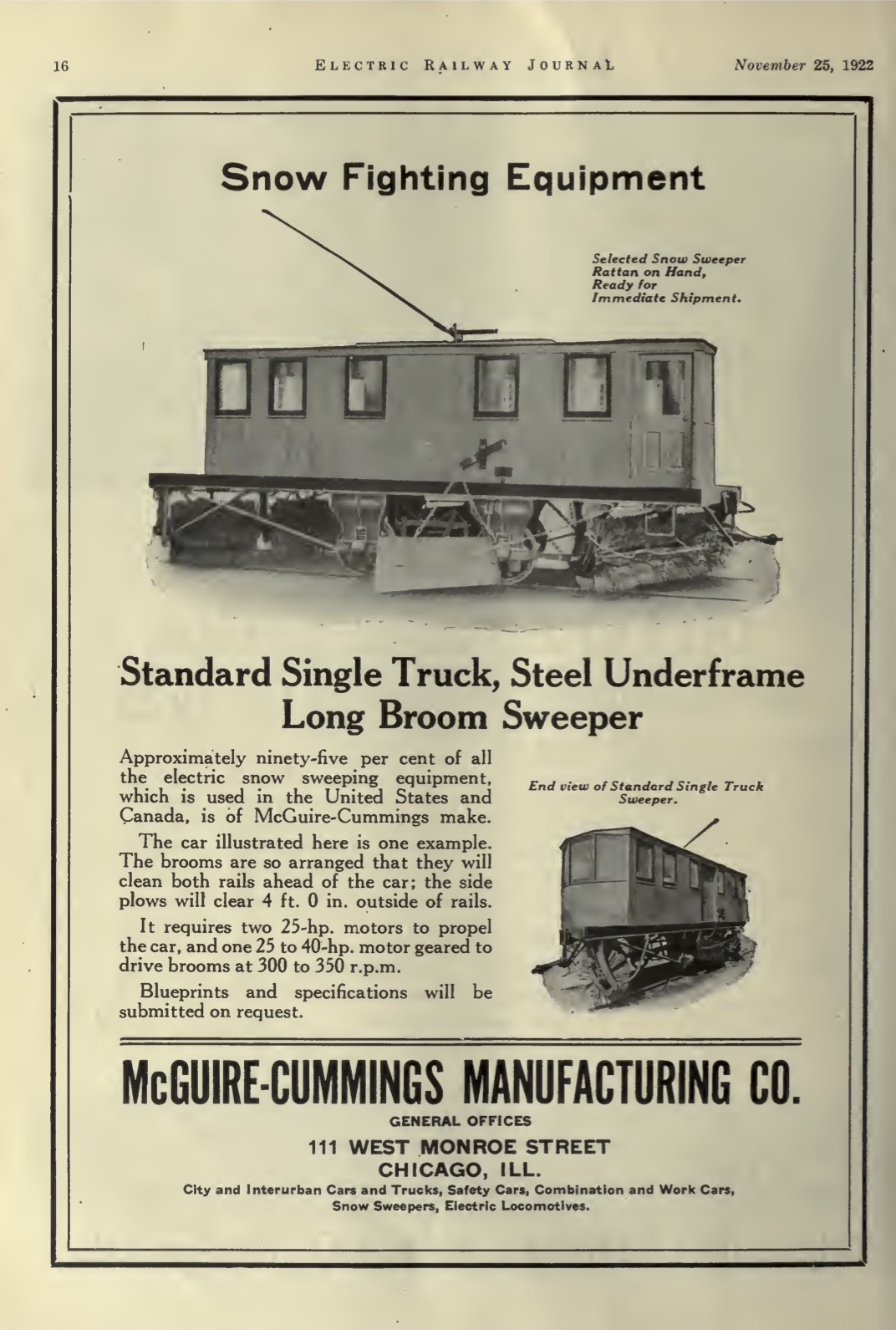
A 1922 advertisement for McGuire-Cummings snow sweepers

The McGuire-Cummings Manufacturing Company was a streetcar and street-railway equipment builder based in the U.S. state of Illinois. It was originally based in Chicago, but had a subsidiary factory in Paris, Illinois, and in its last years it was based in the latter city. It was founded in 1888 as the McGuire Manufacturing Company, later becoming McGuire-Cummings, and finally the Cummings Car and Coach Company. Snowplow cars and snow sweepers – street railway cars designed specifically for snow removal – were among its most popular and best-known products. The company built its last streetcars in 1930, but remained in business until 1943. McGuire-Cummings was one of a few suppliers for the Toronto Civic Railways.

== History ==
=== Overview ===
In The Time of the Trolley, historian William D. Middleton wrote that the company "was initially active as a builder of [street]car trucks, later produced [street railway] snowplows and sweepers, and finally manufactured a general line of steam and electric railway equipment."

Although North America was its principal market, the company also sold its products in foreign markets. Its snow sweeper, in particular, "was a popular item on dozens of European tramway systems," Middleton wrote.

In 1904, McGuire Manufacturing was renamed the McGuire-Cummings Manufacturing Company, with Walter J. Cummings as president. In 1925, it became the Cummings Car & Coach Company, and was based in Paris, Illinois. The company's streetcar production ended in 1930.

=== Notable production and sales ===
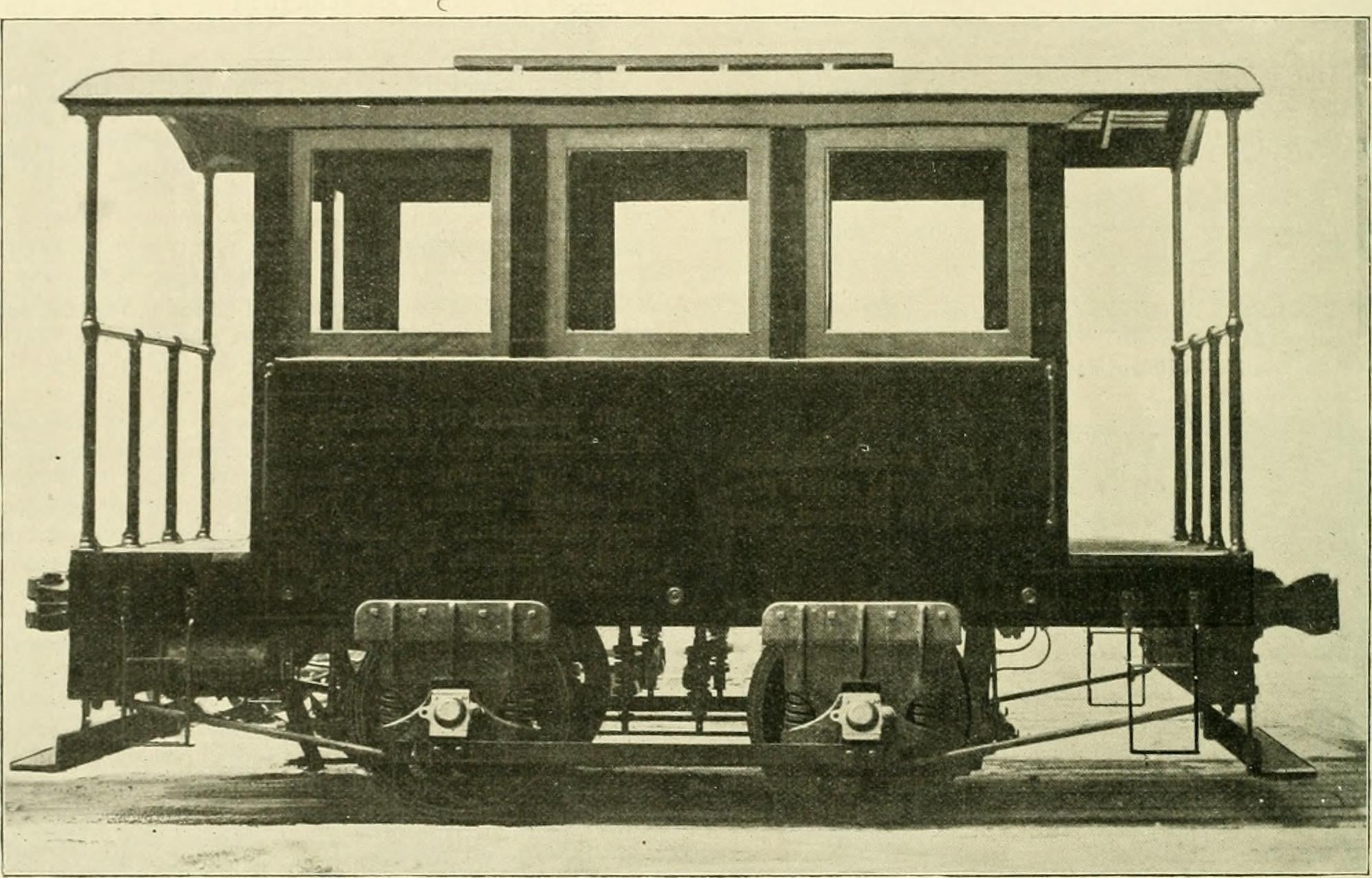
McGuire locomotive for General Electric Co., 1899

The McGuire Manufacturing Co. delivered in 1899 to the General Electric Co., of Schenectady, New York, one of the most compact electric locomotives that it had turned out until then. It was only 14 feet (4.27 m) overall and weighed complete about 22 short tons (20 long tons; 20 t). It was fitted with Westinghouse automatic air brakes, Trojan couplers, chime whistles, General Electric air compressors, and two G.E. 51 electric motors of 150 hp (110 kW) each, giving the machine a capacity of 300 hp (220 kW)

The largest one of the locomotives turned out by the McGuire company by 1899 weighed 60 short tons (54 long tons; 54 t), and was in operation at Yonkers, New York, for hauling steam cars through the tunnel at that point, and the company has made several weighing only 4 short tons (3.6 long tons; 3.6 t), for mining purposes.

The McGuire company was contracted in 1899 to build 60 trucks for San Francisco, 120 for Havana, Cuba, 30 pairs for the Australian Government, and finishing the order for 300 for the Northwestern Elevated Railroad of Chicago, with smaller orders from every part of the United States. It was closing up the largest snowplow business the company has ever done in one year, with two orders, 10 for Washington, D.C., and 15 for St. Louis, besides a large number of single orders, among them being one for Spokane, Washington, and one for Burlington, Vermont.

Plans were being prepared in 1899 for an additional building to be added to the McGuire plant that winter. It was planned to cover the piece of ground on the corner of Kinzie and Morgan Sts., being 116 ft (35.36 m). on Morgan by 166 ft (50.60 m). on Kinzie. This building was planned to be five stories high and devoted entirely to sweeper, electric locomotive, and sprinkler woodwork. The McGuire company was planning to introduce a new sprinkler in 1900, which was planned to be distinctive in design and construction. It was to be equipped with sweeper as well as a sprinkler.

== Products ==
- Double-ended, double-truck streetcars
- Snow sweepers, snowplow cars
- Steeplecab electric locomotives
