= Spadina streetcar line (1923–1948) =

Former streetcar route in Toronto, Ontario

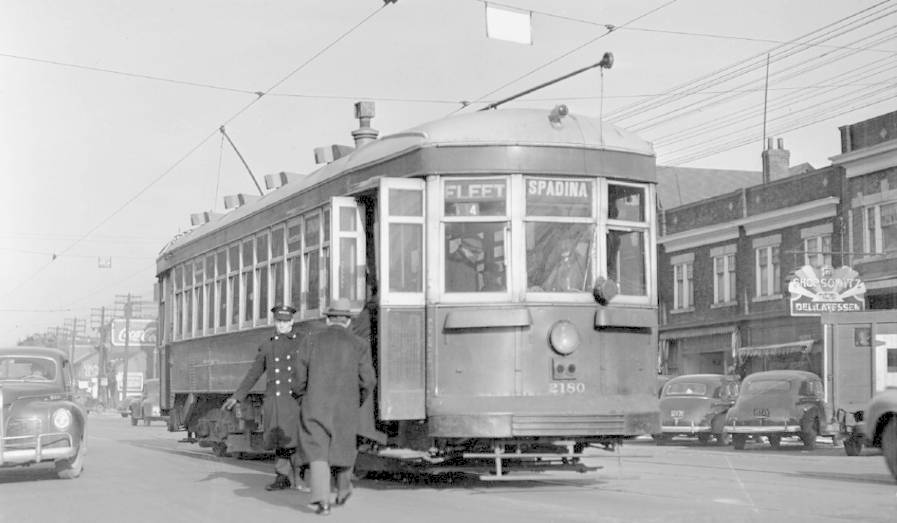
Double-ended Spadina streetcar near Dundas Street

The Toronto Transportation Commission operated a Spadina streetcar line on Spadina Avenue from 1923 to 1948 in Toronto, Ontario, Canada. Spadina Avenue is a major north–south road in downtown Toronto.

== History ==
Streetcar service along Spadina Avenue started in 1878 when the Toronto Street Railway built a horsecar line from King Street to College Street. The horsecar line was extended to Bloor Street in 1883.

In November 1891, shortly after taking over the streetcar system, the Toronto Railway Company (TRC) merged the Spadina streetcar line into its new Belt Line (not to be confused with the Toronto Belt Line Railway, a steam-powered commuter railway line of the same period). The TRC's Belt Line route operated both ways on King Street, Spadina Avenue, Bloor Street, and Sherbourne Street.

After its creation in 1921, the Toronto Transportation Commission (TTC) combined, amalgamated and rationalized the tracks, routes, and rolling stock of several privately held streetcar companies. In a 1923 reconfiguration of the streetcar network, the Belt Line route was discontinued and Spadina became a separate streetcar route starting on July 1, 1923.

Initially, the Spadina streetcar route ran from Bloor Street to Front Street. However, when a bridge over the railway corridor south of Front Street was opened in 1927, the Spadina line was extended south to Fleet Street (today's Lake Shore Boulevard). Because the line had no turning loops, the Spadina route used double-ended vehicles and required crossovers to change direction. There were three crossovers along the line – at Bloor Street, Wellington Street and Lake Shore Boulevard. The streetcars used on the route were built by the Preston Car Company in 1918. The TTC inherited them from the Toronto Civic Railways and designated this series of streetcars as Class J. The Class J streetcars required two-man operation, had rear-door entry and exit, and front-door exit, and used pay-as-you-enter fare collection.

Spadina Avenue used to have a tree-lined boulevard containing streetcar tracks in the middle separate from road traffic. However, sometime during the life the Spadina streetcar route, this boulevard was eliminated and paved for road traffic.

South of Harbord Street, the tracks on Spadina Avenue were also used by the Harbord streetcar route, a route created by the Toronto Railway Company on November 16, 1911.

The Spadina route operated until October 10, 1948, when it was replaced by buses. The conversion to buses was to provide relief from post-war electricity shortages. With the simultaneous closure of the Spadina streetcar route and the North Yonge Railways, the TTC ended the use of double-ended streetcars on its system.

After termination of the Spadina route, the tracks on Spadina between Dundas Street and Harbord Street continued to be used by the Harbord streetcar route until its discontinuation on February 26, 1966. After the demise of the Harbord route, only the tracks between King and College streets were retained along Spadina Avenue, which could be used for diversions. After being rebuilt, the Spadina streetcar line was reinstated as 510 Spadina on July 27, 1997.
