= Preston Car Company =

Rolling stock manufacturer

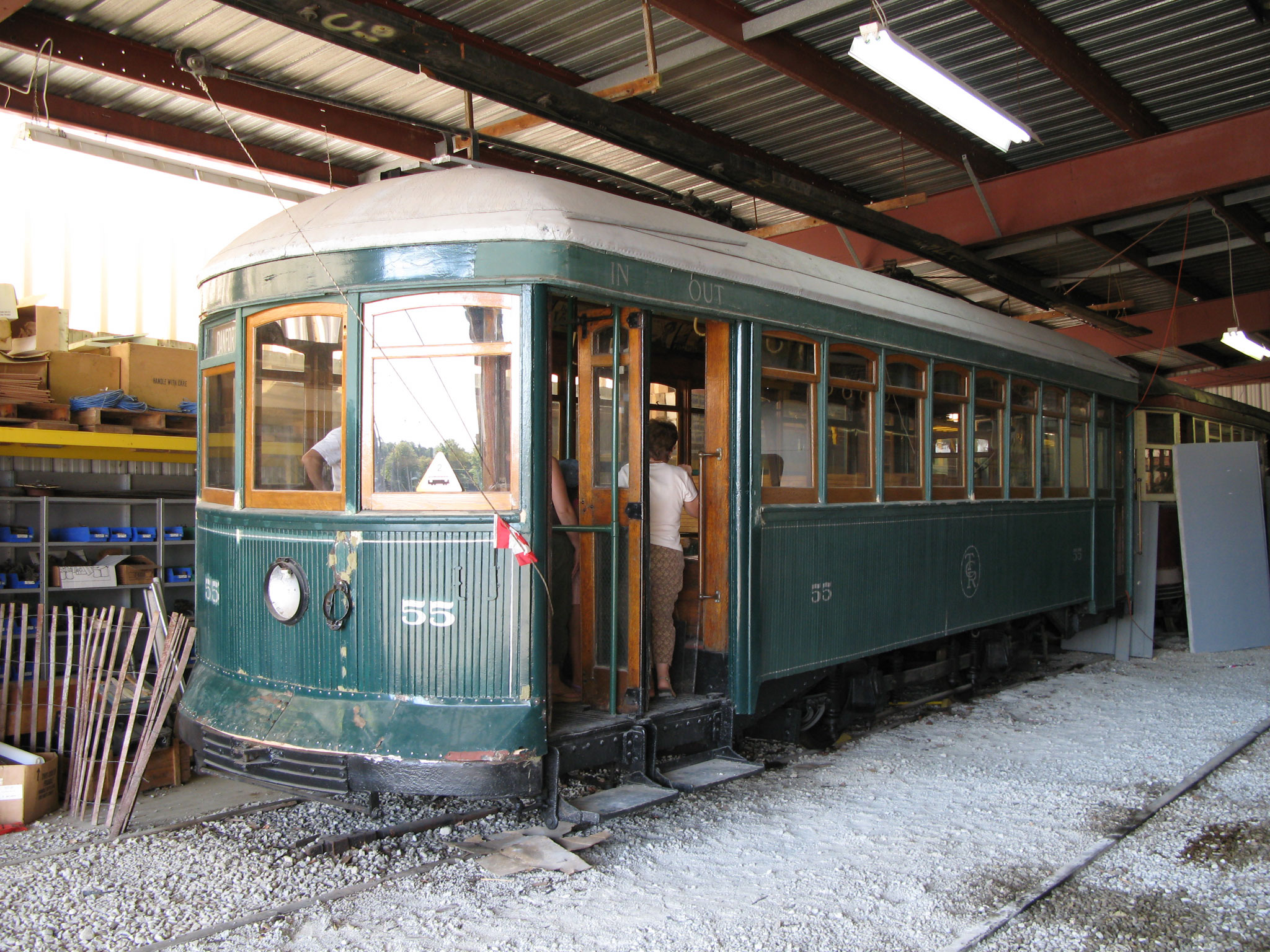
- Toronto Civic Railways streetcar 55, one of the few surviving Preston products, is preserved at the Halton County Radial Railway museum.
- Industry: Rolling stock manufacturing
- Founded: 1908
- Defunct: 1922
- Fate: Acquisition by J. G. Brill followed by plant closure
- Headquarters: Preston, Ontario, Canada
- Products: Interurban and street railway passenger cars

The Preston Car Company was a Canadian manufacturer of streetcars and other railway equipment, founded in 1908. It was formed by local investors including Frederick and George Adam Clare. The company was located in the town of Preston, Ontario (now part of the city of Cambridge). Preston sold streetcars to local transport operators including the Grand River Railway, the Toronto Railway Company and Toronto Civic Railways (the predecessors of today's Toronto Transit Commission), and the Hamilton Street Railway. The company also sold a number of its distinctive ‘Prairie-style’ cars to operators in Alberta and Saskatchewan; one of these cars is being restored by the Saskatchewan Railway Museum. The Edmonton Radial Railway received 8 "Prairie" Prestons in 1909 and 1911 and 35 "Big" Prestons in 1913–14. Only a few Preston-built cars now remain, some of them in the collection of the Halton County Radial Railway museum. The Edmonton Radial Railway Society has in its collection "Prairie" Preston car 31 and "Big" Prestons numbers 53, 65 and 73.

The company was sold to Philadelphia-based J. G. Brill Company in 1921, and the Preston plant closed in 1923.

== Plant ==
From 1908 to 1923 Preston Car plant was located at 633 Margaret Street. After the factory's closure in 1923 the site became a casting plant (later as Kanmet Limited foundry) until 1991. A fire destroyed the foundry, and the site became a vacant brownfield. Part of the old industrial site was redeveloped as Legion (Civic) Park, and the remainder will become a residential development known as Preston Meadows.

== Products ==
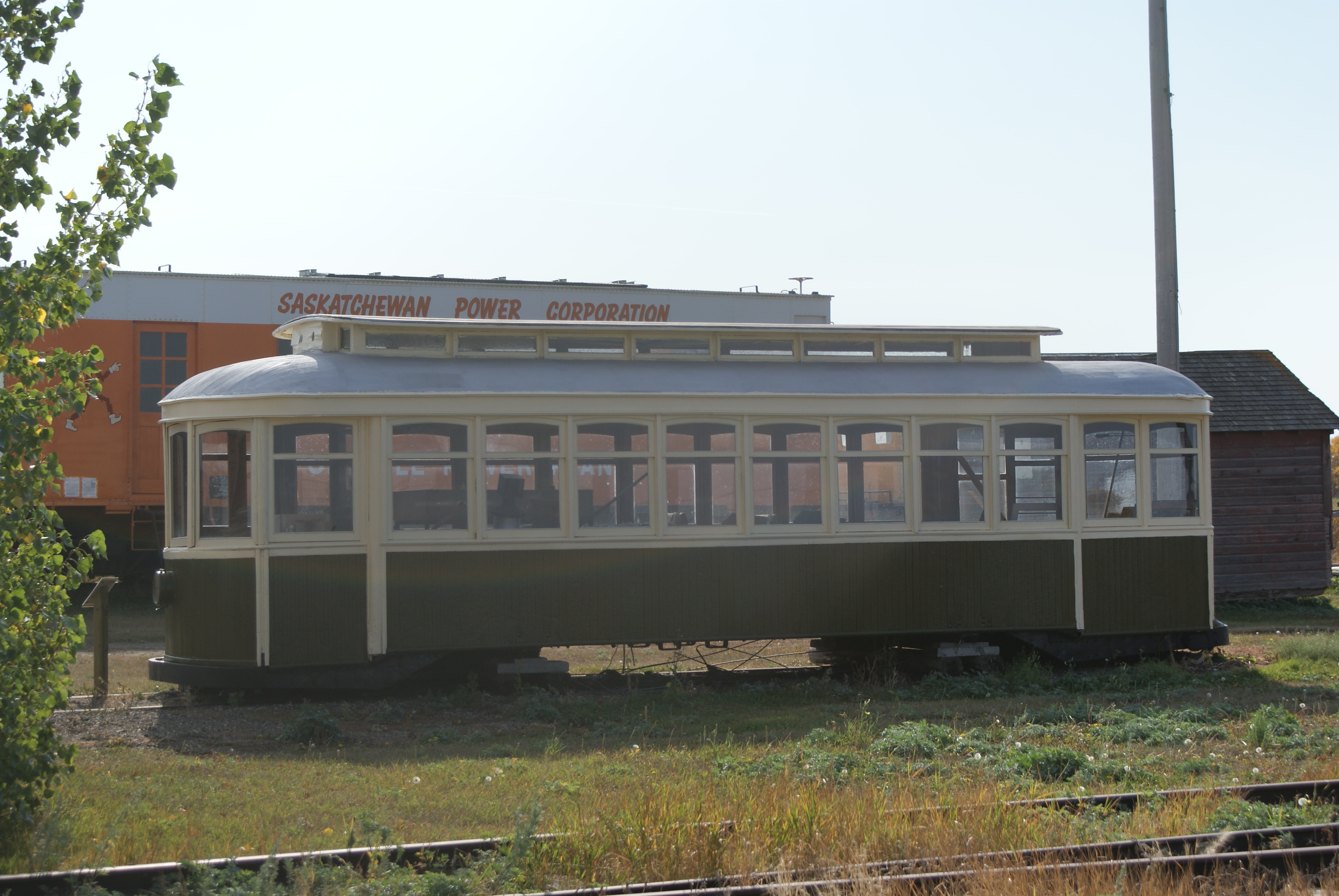
A streetcar once used in Calgary and Saskatoon, preserved at the Saskatchewan Railway Museum

- Birney Car (see TTC Birney Cars)
- radial car for Toronto Suburban Railway
- DE-DT M wood cars - originally ordered by Toronto Civic Railways, these wood DE ST closed electric streetcar were later re-classed as Group D and then later as TTC Class F cars; became work cars for the TTC
- DE-DT steel cars - ordered by Toronto Civic, these electric streetcar were re-classed as TTC class J
- Peter Witt streetcars

== Preserved examples of Preston cars ==
Cars manufactured by the Preston Car Company are on display at the Halton County Radial Railway and Saskatchewan Railway Museum, and one is in service on the Nelson Electric Tramway. The Edmonton Radial Railway Society has four Prestons in its collection: one "Prairie" Preston (ex-Edmonton #31) and three "Big" Prestons (ex-Edmonton #53, 65 and 73).

== See also ==
- J. G. Brill Company
- Canada Car and Foundry
- Ottawa Car Company
- List of tram builders
