= Public transportation in Toronto =

Union Station is a major transportation hub in Toronto, with public transit agencies GO Transit and the Toronto Transit Commission operating from the station.

Public transportation in the Canadian city of Toronto dates back to 1849 with the creation of a horse-drawn stagecoach company. Today, Toronto's mass transit is primarily made up of a system of subways, buses, and streetcars, covering approximately 1,200 km (750 mi) of routes operated by the Toronto Transit Commission (TTC) and inter-regional commuter rail and bus service provided by GO Transit.

== History ==
=== Williams Omnibus Bus Line (1849–1862) ===
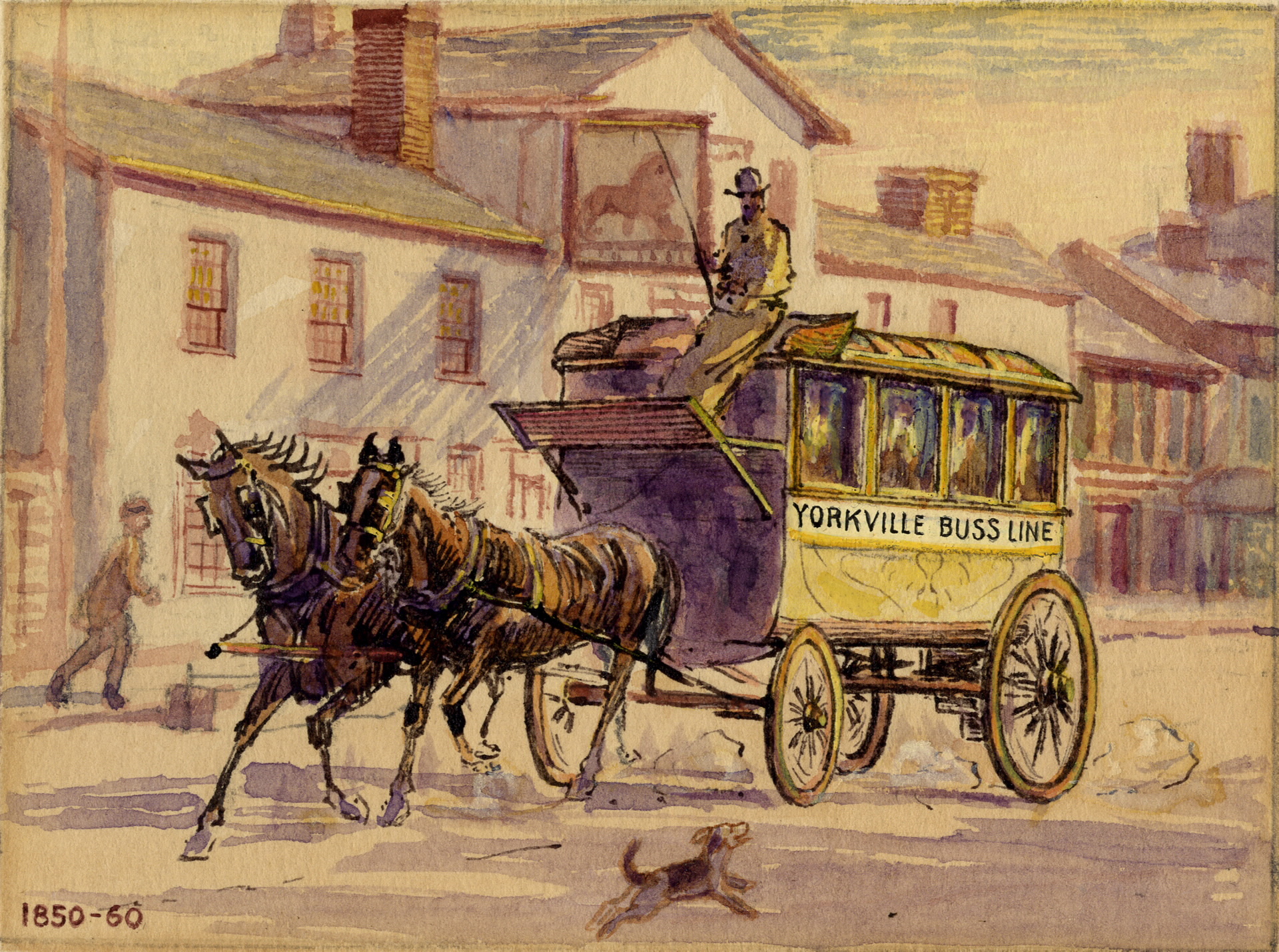
Established in 1849, Williams Omnibus Bus Line was the first mass transit system in the city, operating four horse-drawn stagecoaches from St. Lawrence Market to the Yorkville.

Williams Omnibus Bus Line was the first mass transportation system in the old City of Toronto, Ontario, Canada with four six-passenger buses. Established in 1849 by local cabinetmaker Burt Williams, it consisted of horse-drawn stagecoaches operating from the St. Lawrence Market to the Red Lion Hotel in Yorkville. The bus line was a great success, and four larger vehicles were added in 1850. After a few years, even more buses were in use, and were operating every few minutes. In 1861, the city gave a 30-year franchise to Toronto Street Railway, which built a horse car line, and the gauge of the buses was modified so as to fit between the tracks. The bus system lasted only until 1862, when it was bought out by the TSR.

=== Toronto Street Railway (1861–1891) ===
After the Williams Omnibus Bus Line had become heavily loaded in 1861, the city of Toronto issued a transit franchise (Resolution 14, By-law 353) for a horse-drawn street railway. The winner was Alexander Easton's Toronto Street Railway which opened the first street railway line in Canada on September 11, 1861, operating from Yorkville Town Hall to the St. Lawrence Market. The second line was on Queen Street. On other routes, the TSR continued to operate omnibuses. By 1868, the railway passed into the hands of the bondholders, and in 1869 the company was sold. In 1873 a new act of incorporation was obtained under the old name.

In 1874, extensions were made, and new cars were ordered. New lines were added until the 30-year franchise expired on March 26, 1891. The City operated the system briefly, but soon elected to pass on the rights to a new company, the Toronto Railway Company on September 1, 1891 for another thirty years under James Ross and William Mackenzie.

=== Toronto Railway Company (1891–1921) ===
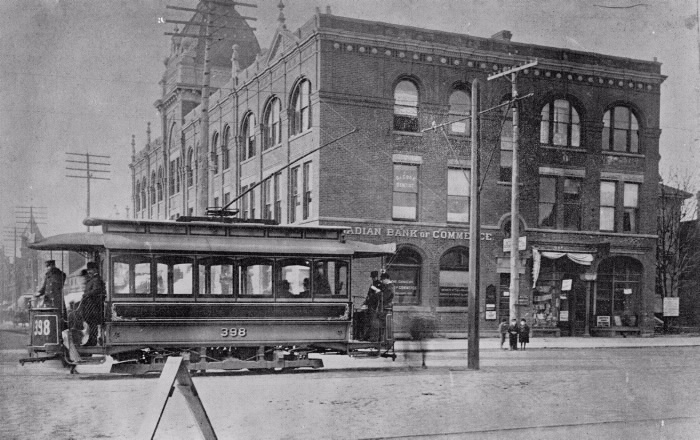
Streetcar operated by the Toronto Railway Company, c. 1895

The Toronto Railway Company (TRC) was the first operator of horseless streetcars in Toronto.

Formed by a partnership between James Ross and William Mackenzie, a 30-year franchise was granted in 1891 to modernize transit operations after a previous 30-year franchise that saw horse car service from the Toronto Street Railway (TSR). At the end of the TSR franchise, the city ran the railway for eight months, but ended up granting another 30-year franchise to a private operator, the TRC. The first electric car ran on August 15, 1892, and the last horse car ran on August 31, 1894, to meet franchise requirements. When the TRC franchise ended in 1921, the Toronto Transportation Commission was created.

==== Toronto Civic Railways (1912–1921) ====
There came to be problems with interpretation of the franchise terms, for the city. A series of annexations, especially in 1908–12, significantly extended the city limits to include such areas as Dovercourt, Earlscourt, East Toronto, Midway (formerly between Toronto and East Toronto), North Toronto, and West Toronto. After many attempts to force the TRC to serve these areas, the city created its own street railway operation, the Toronto Civic Railways, to do so, and built several routes. Repeated court battles did force the TRC to build new cars, but they were of old design. In 1921, with the TRC franchise ending, the city merged TRC and TCR into the Toronto Transportation Commission.

=== Toronto Transportation Commission (1921–1953) ===
In 1920, a Provincial Act created the Toronto Transportation Commission (TTC) and, with the expiration of the TRC's franchise in 1921, the Commission took over and amalgamated nine existing fare systems within the city limits. Between 1921 and 1953, the TTC added 35 new routes in the city and extended 20 more. It also operated 23 suburban routes on a service-for-cost basis. It abandoned the unprofitable North Yonge Railways radial railway line.

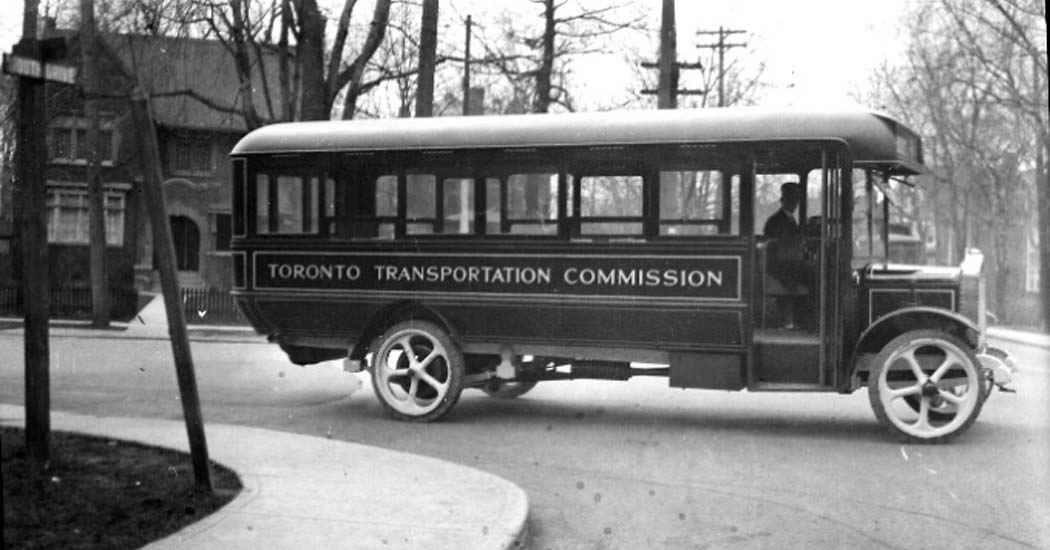
Toronto Transportation Commission bus in Yorkville in 1923

The Great Depression and World War II both placed heavy burdens on the ability of municipalities to finance themselves. During most of the 1930s, municipal governments had to cope with general welfare costs and assistance to the unemployed. The TTC realized that improvements had to be made, despite the depression, and in 1936, purchased the first of the newly developed Presidents' Conference Committee (PCC) streetcars, which are custom-designed. The war put an end to the depression and increased migration from rural to urban areas. After the war, municipalities faced the problem of extending services to accommodate the increased population. Ironically, the one municipal service that prospered during the war years was public transit; employers had to stagger work hours in order to avoid overcrowding the streetcars. Toronto continued their program of purchasing PCC cars, running the world's largest fleet, including many obtained second-hand from U.S. cities that abandoned streetcar service.

=== Toronto Transit Commission (1954–present) ===
Public transit was one of the essential services identified by Metropolitan Toronto's founders in 1953. On January 1, 1954, the Toronto Transportation Commission was renamed the Toronto Transit Commission and kept the acronym of TTC and public transit was placed under the jurisdiction of the new Municipality of Metropolitan Toronto. The assets and liabilities of the TTC and four independent bus lines operating in the suburbs were acquired by the Commission. In 1954, the TTC became the sole provider of public transportation services in Metro Toronto until the creation of GO Transit in 1968.

=== GO Transit (1968–present) ===
GO Transit is an interregional provincially run public transit system in the Greater Toronto and Hamilton Area (GTHA) conurbation, with operations extending to several communities in the Greater Golden Horseshoe. The GO network employs double-decker diesel trains and coach buses; it connects with other regional transit providers such as the TTC and Via Rail.

== Current system ==
=== Airport rail link ===
The Union Pearson Express (UP Express) is an airport rail link service. It runs between Canada's two busiest transportation hubs: Union Station in Downtown Toronto and Toronto Pearson International Airport along GO Transit's Kitchener line. It also stops at Weston and Bloor GO Transit stations.

UP Express train at Weston Station

=== Airport people mover ===
The Terminal Link is a people mover monorail hybrid located in Toronto Pearson International Airport. It runs between Terminal 1, Terminal 3, and a long term parking lot. Any future extensions are not yet planned.

=== Buses and streetcars ===
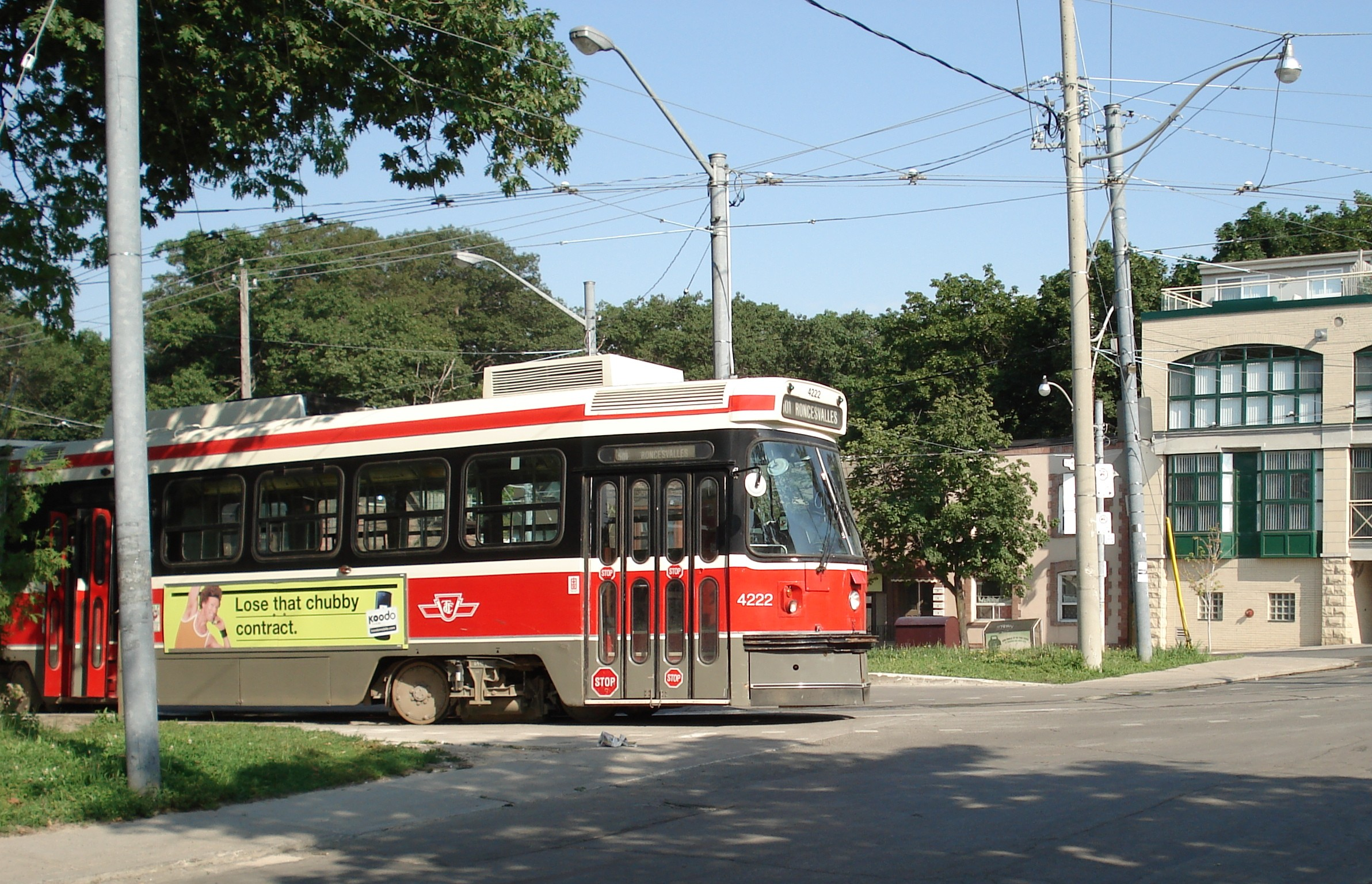
A TTC ALRV streetcar at the east end of the 501 Queen streetcar route

The rest of the city is primarily served by a network of about 150 bus routes, many of them forming a grid along main streets, and all of them connecting to one or more subway stations (except for route branch 80B Queensway which serves Mimico GO Station; seasonal route 200 Toronto Zoo; and community bus routes 405 Etobicoke and 406 Scarborough-Guildwood). A more distinctive feature of the TTC is the streetcar system, one of the few remaining in North America with a substantial amount of in-street operation. The city of Toronto has the largest streetcar system in the Americas. Most of the eleven streetcar routes are concentrated in the downtown core and all connect to the subway. The TTC also operates a night bus service called the Blue Night Network. Four routes of the Blue Night Network are operated using streetcars as well.

=== Commuter rail and buses ===
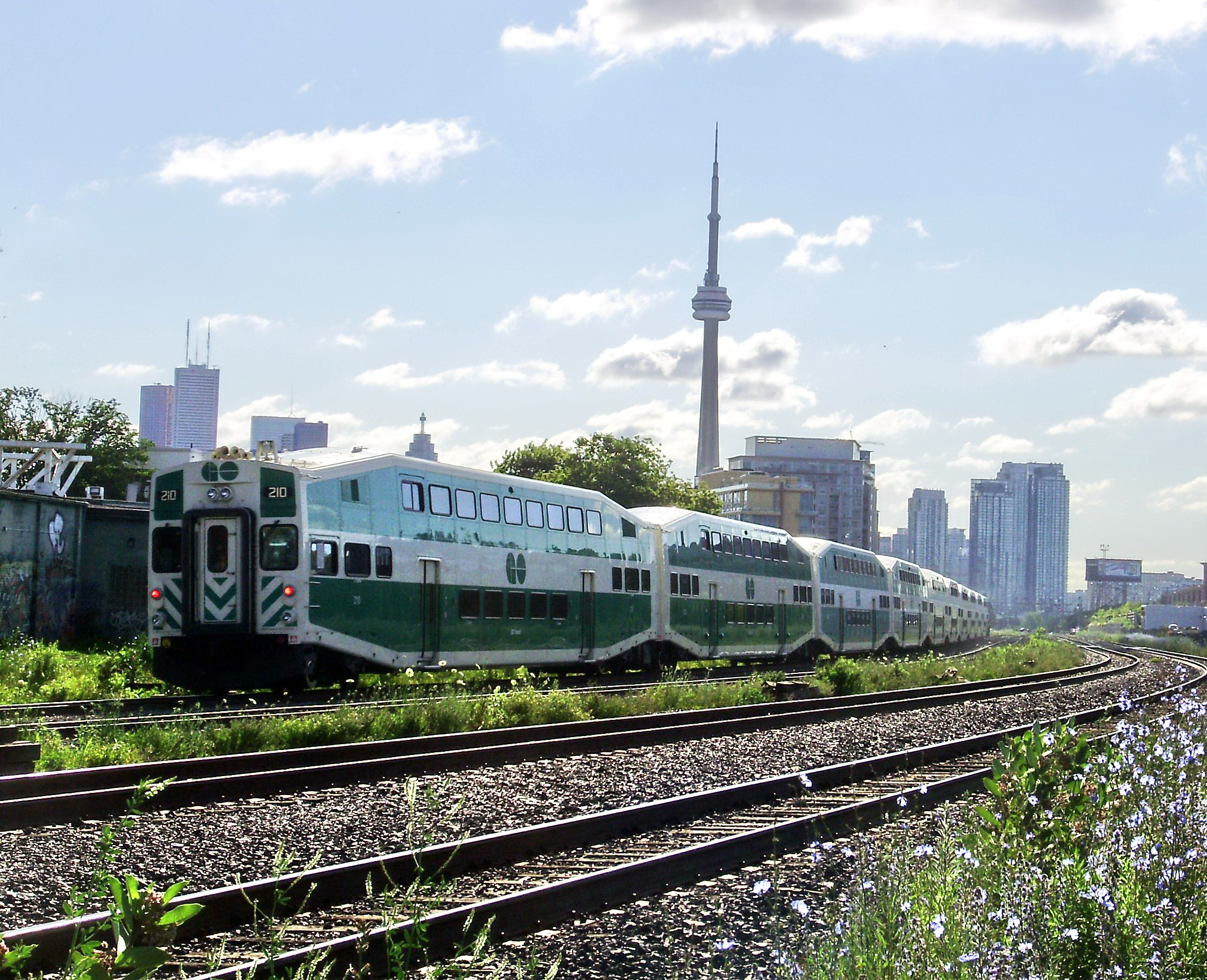
A southbound GO train on the Kitchener line. GO Transit is a regional public transit system that services the Greater Toronto Area.

Interregional commuter rail and bus service is provided by GO Transit. GO trains and buses connect the city to the rest of the Greater Toronto Area. Ontario Northland Motor Coach Services operates buses to destinations in northern Ontario.

=== Paratransit ===
Wheel-Trans is a specialized accessible transit service in Toronto, provided by the TTC. It involves door-to-door accessible transit service for persons with physical disabilities using its fleet of accessible minibuses. The TTC also operates designated 400-series community routes.

=== Ferry system ===
The Toronto Island ferries connect the Toronto Islands in Lake Ontario to the mainland of Toronto. The ferries provide access to the islands for recreational visitors and access to the mainland for island residents from the Jack Layton Ferry Terminal. A ferry and pedestrian tunnel with moving walkways provide access to the Billy Bishop Toronto City Airport on the western end of Toronto Island from the foot of Bathurst Street.

=== Subway system ===
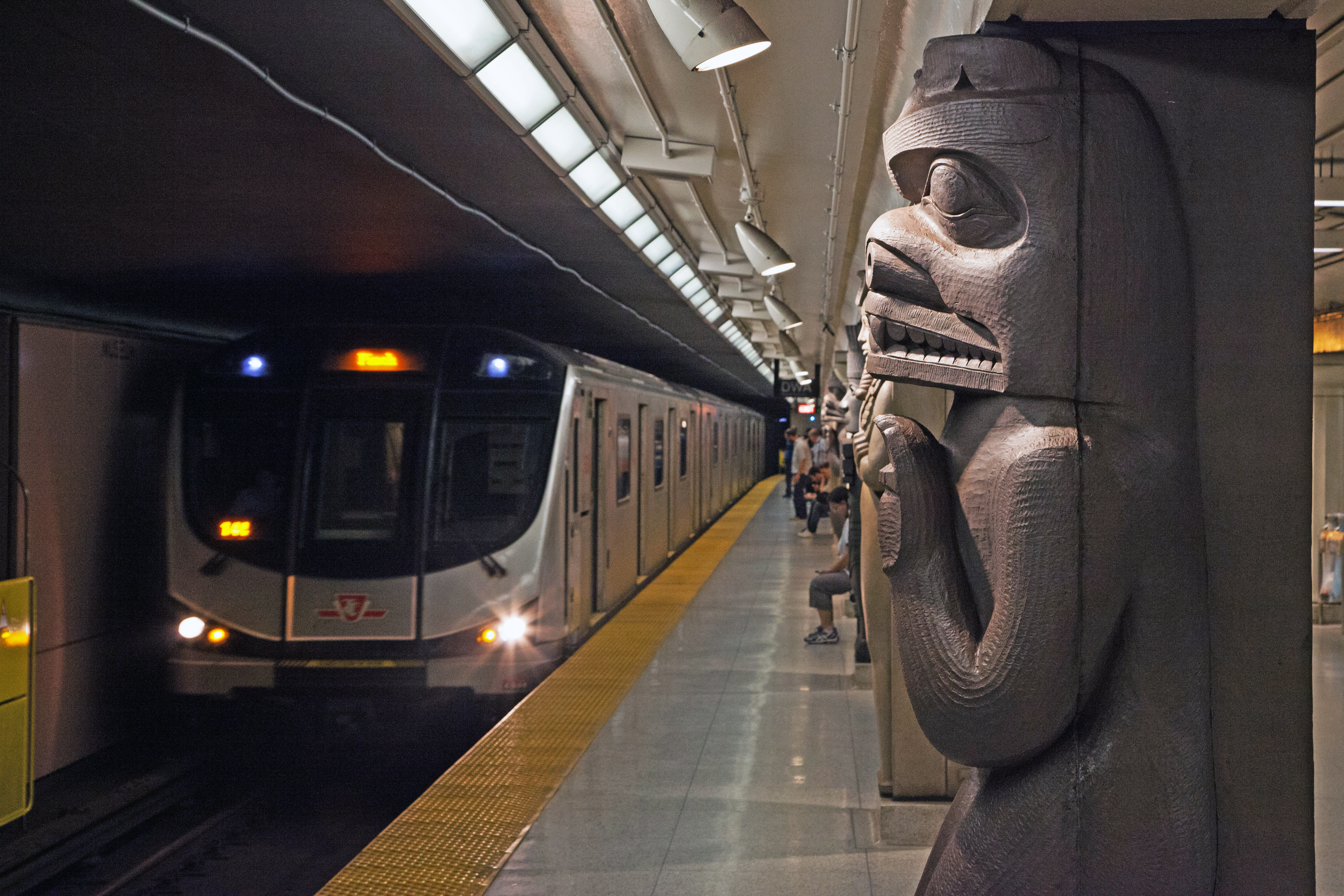
Platform level at Museum station on the TTC's Line 1 Yonge–University

The backbone of the TTC is a basic subway system with five lines, including the U-shaped Line 1 Yonge–University and the east–west Line 2 Bloor–Danforth, running along principal streets and connecting Toronto's outlying areas with its downtown core. Line 1's western arm extends outside of Toronto city limits at Steeles Avenue to Vaughan at Vaughan Metropolitan Centre station. Line 6 Finch West, a 11-kilometre (6.8 mi) 19-stop light rail line running between Finch West station, where it interchanges with Line 1, and ending at a terminus at Humber College station, opened in December 2025. Line 5 Eglinton, a 19-kilometre (12 mi) light rail line, runs along Eglinton Avenue from Mount Dennis in York to Kennedy station. The first phase of Line 5 has 25 stations and opened in February 2026, following several delays.

== Future system ==
=== Ontario Line ===
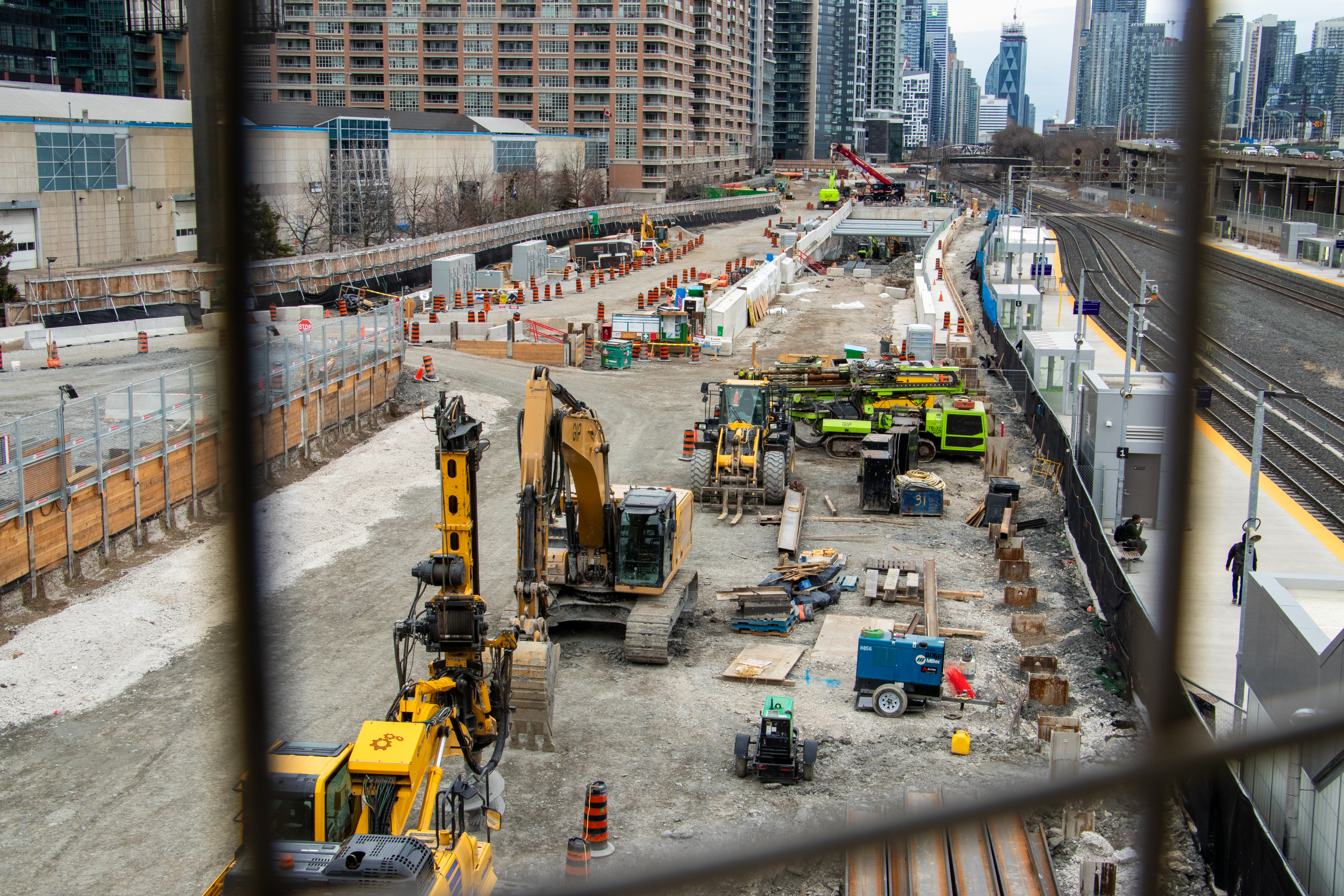
Ontario Line construction at Exhibition station in April 2025

The Ontario Line, announced in April 2019, is a successor project to the long-planned Relief Line that serves Downtown Toronto. Unlike the Relief Line, the Ontario Line will operate from Don Valley station to Exhibition station and use different rail technology. The East Harbour Transit Hub will open in 2028.

== Statistics ==
In 2017, the average amount of time people spend commuting with public transit in Toronto, for example to and from work, on a weekday is 96 minutes. 34% of public transit riders ride for more than two hours every day. The average amount of time people wait at a stop or station for public transit is 14 minutes, while 10% of riders wait for over twenty minutes on average every day. The average distance people usually ride in a single trip with public transit is 10 kilometres (6.2 mi), while 25% travel for over 12 kilometres (7.5 mi) in a single direction.
