= Phoenix Carriage Works =

Canadian carriage building company

Phoenix Carriage Works was a carriage builder established in the 1840s in Markham Village, Ontario, Canada. The company was a rival to Thomas Speight Wagon Works.

== Henry R. Wales ==
English immigrant Henry R. Wales (1822-1905), who began as a blacksmith and learned the trade (in the United States) which led to the founding of Phoenix Carriage Works. Besides his business, Wales was a school trustee and magistrate under the Liberal governments of Oliver Mowat and James Whitney. Wales and his wife Elizabeth had 6 children (including daughters Adelaide Emma, Bertha E, Lottie A.), whom lived at Maple Villa, the only reminder of the Wales that remains in Markham today.

== Factory ==
Their factory was located next to 159 Main Street North and ceased making carriages after 1915 with focus on repairing automobiles and ceased altogether in 1923 after death of son-in-law Levi Webber
