= Thomas Speight Wagon Works =

Canadian carriage builder

Thomas Speight Wagon Works was a Canadian carriage builder based in Markham, Ontario, and was the biggest supplier of horsecars for the Toronto Street Railways, but took orders as far west as Winnipeg, Manitoba.

== History ==
In 1830, Thomas Speight of Yorkshire, England, established a wagon manufacturing facility in the village of Markham. The operations grew on Main Street Markham. Some parts of the wagon builder were located on the northwest corner of Main Street north of Highway 7, just south of the St. Andrew's United Church and later on the east side of Main Street (20 Main Street – now Thomson Court Apartments and Paradise Plaza). The company even had a distribution office in Toronto (102 Front Street East), then two warehouses on Ontario Street and Jarvis Street in 1900 and in Fort William, Ontario.

James Speight (1830–1903), son of Thomas, continued the family business in Markham having rebuilt after the 1877 fire and was the first reeve of Markham Village in 1873. In 1882 it became Speight Manufacturing Company of Markham Limited, but it ran into trouble. However, it was saved by Thomas Heys and Thomas Henry Speight (son of Thomas Speight) in 1890 and became Speight Wagon Company. James Speight died in Markham in 1903.

Thomas' son John Speight established a carriage builder, John Speight and Sons with brothers Samuel and later Michael) in the 1850s in Acton, Ontario by the 1850s and remained there until their deaths (John in 1881 and Samuel in 1882). His company was passed on to brother Michael (who died in 1889 after leaving Acton for Markham after 1882) and finally to Joseph Albert Speight (1846–1902).

Speight also operated a planing mill and sash-and-door factory near the wagon works. In 1910 the company was acquired by Port Arthur Wagon Company and folded shortly after and the Port Arthur Wagon folded by the end of World War I in 1918.

== End of Speight Wagon Works ==
The Markham factory remained in operation until November 1917, likely due to the decline in use of wagons and sleighs with use of the automobiles.

One office building near 20 Main Street became Beare Sons & Clayton General Motors dealership and in 1921 Markham Garage. The factory buildings and the garage burned down in 1922. Today the site of the old factory and garage has been replaced with several businesses fronting Main Street and a condo in the rear. The company had a warehouse at 102 Front Street East in Toronto.

The Speights and some of their employees had homes along Main Street. Some of the homes survive today, such as 40–44 Main Street North. James Speight built his home at 48 Main Street North, now the Wedding Cake House.

== Products ==
Speight sold their products for retail and wholesale market. Most customers were farmers or companies needing a means to transport goods.

- Horsecars — Toronto Street Railways
- horse-drawn sled – Manitoba bobsleigh and Ontario bobs – runners only (likely for farm or freight use)
- un-sprung cart or Farm/Railroad dump cart – 2 wheels
- horse drawn lorry
- Farm wagon
  - Ontario Farm Wagon
  - One horse
  - Dominion Farm Wagon
  - Prairie Farm Wagon
- Freight wagon
- Saw log truck
- Farm implements
- low wheel farm truck
- baby carriages

== See also ==
In the 19th century there were two other carriage builders in York Region:

- Trench Carriage Works of Richmond Hill, Ontario – founded by Scottish immigrant William Trench III in 1857 as a blacksmith operations and largest employer in the 1870s to 1890s
- Phoenix Carriage Works – rival carriage builder established in the 1840s next to Maple Villa by English immigrant Henry R. Wales (1822–1905) who learned the trade in the United States; located next to 159 Main Street North, the company stopped making carriages after 1915 and the business closed in 1923 after death of son-in-law Levi Webber
