= Williams Omnibus Bus Line =

First passenger transport system in Toronto, Ontario

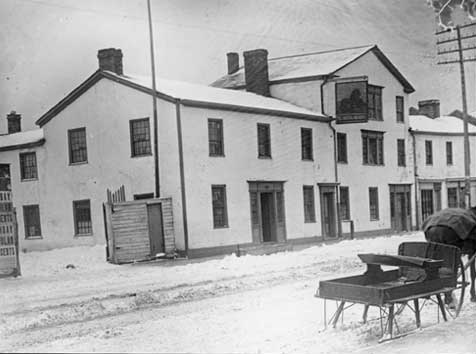
The first transit system in Toronto commenced in 1849, connecting St. Lawrence Market to the Red Lion Inn (shown above in 1886) in Yorkville.

Williams Omnibus Bus Lines was the first mass transportation system in the old City of Toronto, Ontario, Canada with four six-passenger buses. Established in 1849 by local cabinetmaker Burt Williams, it consisted of horse-drawn stagecoaches operating from the St. Lawrence Market to the Red Lion Hotel in Yorkville. The bus line was a great success, and four larger vehicles were added in 1850. After a few years, even more buses were in use, and were operating every few minutes. In 1861, the city gave a 30-year franchise to Toronto Street Railways who built a horse car line, and the gauge of the buses was modified so as to fit between the tracks. The bus system lasted only until 1862, when it was bought out by the TSR. The omnibuses were manufactured by Williams' own cabinet-making store on Yonge Street, H. Burt Williams.

Prior to Williams' operations, there were a variety of stagecoach operators in the city:

- Marlborough Stage
- Rossin House Hotel - King and Wellington Streets
- Charles Thompson - Yonge Street at Elgin Mills Hotel in Richmond Hill, Ontario to St. Lawrence Market
- Barnabas Vanderburgh's Hotel in Richmond Hill, Ontario
- Eastern Mail Stage
- Rouge - Scarborough, Ontario
- Markham Village - Markham Village
- Western Mail Stage - Lambton House to Dundas
- Streetsville - now part of Mississauga
- Holland Landing - from York to Holland Landing
- Pine Grove to Weston, Ontario
- Canadian Transfer Company
- Samuel D. Purdy 1816 - founder of first stagecoach line in Upper Canada from York to Newark (Niagara-on-the-Lake)
- William Weller 1832 - from Coffin Block to Kingston, Ontario and also operated services in Cobourg, Ontario, Port Hope, Ontario, Peterborough, Ontario, Kingston-Prescott; Weller was mayor of Cobourg, Ontario
- John Playter 1828-1832 from York to Newmarket, Ontario

== Fleet ==
Product list and details
Builder	Description	Fleet size	Year acquired	Year retired	Notes
H. Burt Williams cabinet store, Toronto	small omnibus (6 passenger stage coach)	4	1849	1862	horse drawn stagecoach
H. Burt Williams cabinet store, Toronto	large omnibus	4	1850	1862	horse drawn stagecoach

== See also ==
The companies and agencies that succeeded Williams:

- Toronto Civic Railways
- Toronto Railway Company
- Toronto Street Railways
- Toronto Transit Commission
- Toronto Transportation Commission

Preceded by None	Public Transit in Toronto; 1849-1861	Succeeded by Toronto Street Railways
