= John Speight and Sons =

Manufacturing e

John Speight and Sons (died 1881) was a Canadian carriage builder in Acton, Ontario established by brothers Samuel and John Speight in 1850 (joined by brother Michael in 1856).

The Speight brothers were the sons of Thomas Speight, who established Thomas Speight Wagon Works in Markham, Ontario sometime after 1830.

Speight was also a trustee of the Acton Public Burying Ground. His son Joseph Albert Speight (1846-1902) took over the business after 1881 and maintained it until his death in 1902.

== Products ==
- undertaking services
- wagons
