= Toronto Transportation Commission =

Former public transit operator in Toronto, Canada

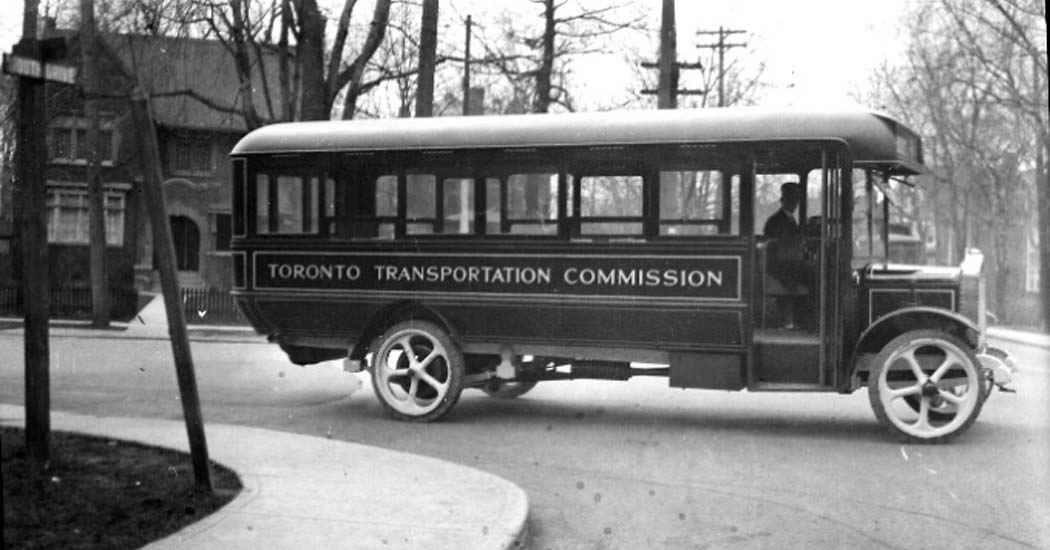
Toronto Transportation Commission bus, circa 1923

The Toronto Transportation Commission (TTC) was the public transit operator in Toronto, Ontario, Canada, beginning in 1921. It operated buses, streetcars and the island ferries. The system was renamed the Toronto Transit Commission (TTC) in 1954.

== History ==
Toronto's first public transportation company was the Williams Omnibus Bus Line and owned by undertaker Burt Williams. The franchise carried passengers in horse-drawn stagecoaches along Yonge Street between the St. Lawrence Market and the village of Yorkville for sixpence in 1849. The city granted the first franchise for a street railway in 1861 to Alexander Easton under the franchise of Toronto Street Railways (TSR) and Metropolitan Street Railway of Toronto (MSR) in 1885. In 1891, the franchise was passed onto William Mackenzie's Toronto Railway Company for 30 years. Outside of the city there were a number of other operators, including:

- Toronto and York Radial Railway
- Toronto Suburban Railway

Prior to the establishment of the TTC, the City of Toronto operated its own system under the Toronto Civic Railways (TCR). However, the TCR routes were operating in areas not served by the private TRC. In 1920, a Provincial Act created the Toronto Transportation Commission (TTC) and, in 1921, the Commission took over and amalgamated nine existing fare systems within the city limits. Between 1921 and 1953, the TTC added 35 new routes in the city and extended 20 more. It also operated 23 suburban routes on a service-for-cost basis. It abandoned money-losing radial railway line (known as 'interurbans' elsewhere in the continent), North Yonge Railways.

The Great Depression and the Second World War both placed heavy burdens on the ability of municipalities to finance themselves. During most of the 1930s, municipal governments had to cope with general welfare costs and assistance to the unemployed. The TTC realized that improvements had to be made despite the depression and in 1936 purchased the first of the newly developed PCC streetcars. The war put an end to the depression and increased migration from rural to urban areas. After the war, municipalities faced the problem of extending services to accommodate the increased population. Ironically, the one municipal service that prospered during the war years was public transit; employers had to stagger work hours in order to avoid overcrowding the streetcars. Toronto continued their program of purchasing PCC cars, running the world's largest fleet, including many obtained second-hand from U.S. cities that abandoned streetcar service.

With the creation of Metro Toronto in 1954 and the building of the Yonge subway line, the Toronto Transportation Commission was renamed the Toronto Transit Commission.

== Streetcar ==
The Toronto Transportation Commission was mainly a streetcar operator and this remained the core operations before 1954:

All remaining Toronto Railway Company cars as of 1921 and all Toronto Civic Railways cars as of 1921 was absorbed into the TTC. Some older wooden cars were retired due to wear and replaced by Peter Witt orders.

Product list and details (date information from TTC)
Make/Model	Description	Fleet size	Year acquired	Year retired	Notes
Preston Car Company / Birney Safety Car	Single truck double-end car	25	1921	1926–1927: 11 cars total sold with 3 to Cornwall Street Railway (all scrapped in 1949); 8 sold to Nova Scotia Tramways and Power Company Limited (all scrapped in 1949); 1940–1941: remaining 14 cars sold to two batches to Halifax, 8 in 1940 and 6 in 1941)	Ex-TCR
Canada Car and Foundry / Brill Peter Witts – Large with trailers	Single end double-truck electric streetcar	575	1921–1923	1965	Small Peter Witt 2766 retained for private charters
Canada Car and Foundry / Ottawa Car Company Peter Witts – Small Witts	Single end double-truck electric streetcar	N/A	N/A	N/A	
St. Louis Car Company and CCF President's Conference Committee Car A1	Single end double-truck electric streetcar	N/A	N/A	N/A	
St. Louis Car Company PCC A2–8	Single end double-truck electric streetcar	N/A	N/A	N/A	
St. Louis Car Company PCC A9–10	Single end double-truck electric streetcar	N/A	N/A	N/A	Ex-Cincinnati
St. Louis Car Company PCC A11	Single end double-truck electric streetcar	N/A	N/A	N/A	Ex-Cleveland
St. Louis Car Company PCC A12	Single end double-truck electric streetcar	N/A	N/A	N/A	Ex-Louisville
St. Louis Car Company PCC A13	Single end double-truck electric streetcar	N/A	1953	N/A	Ex-Birmingham

== Buses ==
Buses are a large part of the TTC operations today, but before the 1960s they played a lesser role to streetcar operations. Bus service in Toronto started in 1921, but it was not until the creation of the TTC that buses become a part of public transit. There were a few independent bus operators that continued to provide inter-urban bus services:

- Hollinger Bus Lines (East York and Scarborough 1921–1954)
- Danforth Bus Lines (Scarborough, North York and York 1926–1954)
- West York Coach Lines (York, Etobicoke and Malton 1946–1954)
- Roseland Bus Lines (York, Weston-Woodbridge 1925–1954)

Here is a list of historic and current buses used by the old TTC:

Product list and details (date information from TTC)
Make/Model	Description	Fleet size	Year acquired	Year retired	Notes
AEC 404	Double-decker bus	1	1922	1940s?	Upper level was removed in 1925
Fifth Avenue Bus Company L and J	Double-decker bus	4 – L, 6 – J	1921, 1922	1940s?	1 preserved at Canada Science and Technology Museum
Pierce Arrow Z	Diesel bus	2	1922	1940s?	
Tilling-Stevens TS4	Diesel bus	1	1922	1940s?	
Veteran K	Diesel bus	1	1927	1940s?	
White Motor Company 50A	Diesel bus	6	1924	1940s?	
White Motor Company 50A	Diesel bus	5, 10	1927, 1929	1940s?	1929 purchase from Highway Queen Bus Lines; 2 sent to Gray Coach
White Motor Company 50B	Diesel bus	5	1927	1940s?	
Packard ED	Diesel bus	1	1922	1940s?	
Yellow Coach Y-Z (227, 229)	Diesel bus	5, 6	1925	1940s?	
Yellow Coach Y	Diesel bus	1	1925	1940s?	
Yellow Coach Y-O-254	Diesel bus	1	1927	1940s?	
Yellow Coach Z-AQ-273	Diesel bus	4	1926	1940s?	
Yellow Coach Y-U-316	Diesel bus	3	1927	1940s?	

== Suburban and inter-urban buses ==
Gray Coach Lines was suburban bus operator founded in 1927 by the Toronto Transit Commission. Gray Coach used inter-urban coaches to link Toronto to outlying areas throughout Southern Ontario. In addition, Gray Coach operated tour bus operations in association with Gray Line tours. The main terminal was at the Toronto Bus Terminal on Elizabeth Street, downtown.

Here is a list of historic and current buses used by the Gray Coach:

Product list and details (date information from TTC)
Make/Model	Description	Fleet size	Year acquired	Year retired	Notes
AEC/CCC Ranger Coach	Suburban coach	4	1932–1933	N/A	Later to Gray Coach
GM Highway Parlour Coach PD4104	Suburban coach	7	1950s	N/A	Later to Gray Coach

== Trolley bus lines ==
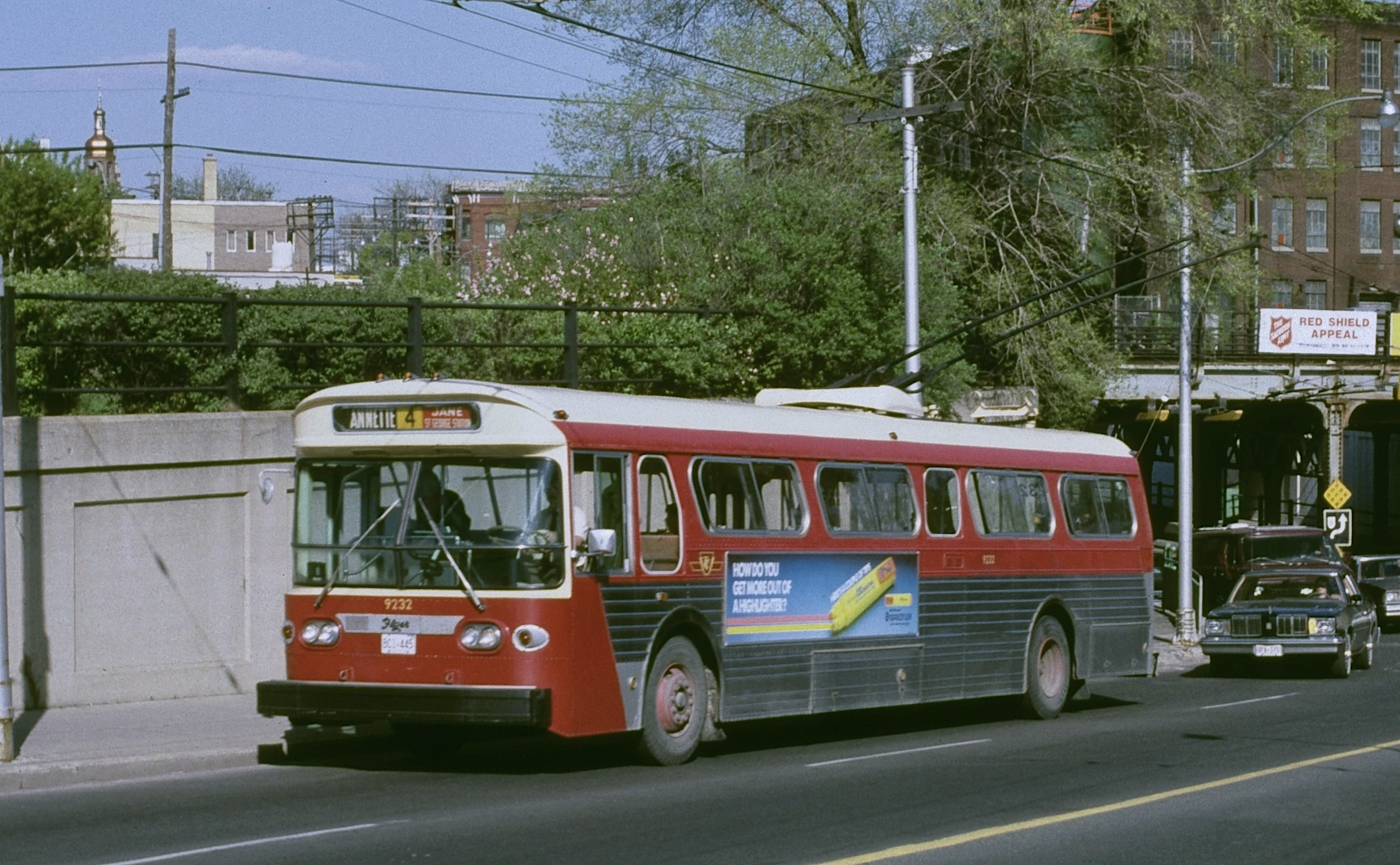
One of TTC's 151 Flyer E700A trolley buses, 1987

The TTC once operated trolley buses on 10 routes, mostly on downtown routes and a few in the northern limits of the City of Toronto. The first route began operation with four buses on June 19, 1922, from a shed on Merton St. This early trolley coach operation was replaced by a streetcar line. In later years, many of these routes replaced streetcar routes, using the old overhead power system which was adapted to dipole service. The buses consisted of a standard bus platform with electric motors with two trolley poles connected to electrical lines above. The second, main trolley bus system operated from 1947 to 1993.

== Island Ferry ==
In 1926, the City of Toronto purchased the ferry services operated by the Toronto Ferry Company. The fleet was transferred to the TTC, which engaged in a modernization program, retiring the smaller older vessels, and purchasing modern, diesel-powered ferries which still provide the backbone of modern service to the Islands.

== See also ==
- Toronto Transit Commission

Preceded by Toronto Civic Railways and Toronto Railway Company	Public Transit in Toronto; 1921–1954	Succeeded by renamed Toronto Transit Commission
