= Toronto Street Railway =

Streetcar operator in Toronto, Canada, from 1861 to 1891

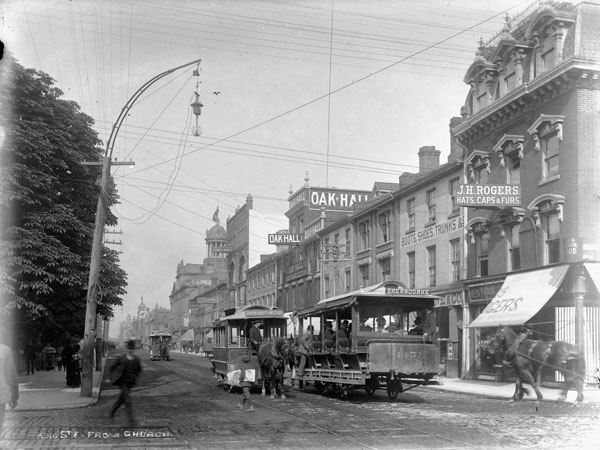
- Toronto Street Railway horsecar on King Street. View from Church Street.

Overview
- Headquarters: Toronto
- Locale: Toronto
- Dates of operation: 1861–1891
- Successor: Toronto Railway

Technical
- Track gauge: 4 ft 10 7/8 in (1,495 mm) Toronto gauge

The Toronto Street Railway (TSR) was the operator of a horse-drawn streetcar system from 1861 to 1891 in Toronto, Ontario, Canada. Its successor, the Toronto Railway Company, inherited the horsecar system and electrified it between 1892 and 1894.

== History ==
=== Early years (1861–1873) ===
After the Williams Omnibus Bus Line had become heavily loaded in 1861, the city of Toronto issued a transit franchise (Resolution 14, By-law 353) for a horse-drawn street railway. The winner was Alexander Easton's Toronto Street Railway, which was required to build streetcar lines along Yonge, Queen and King Streets. Service was required to be 16 hours per day, 14 in winter with a headway of no more than 30 minutes at a speed not to exceed 6 mph (10 km/h). The fare was 5 cents with no transfer privileges and no discounted fare for children.

The company opened the first street railway line in Canada on September 11, 1861, operating from Yorkville Town Hall via Yonge and King Streets to the St. Lawrence Market. (There was a ceremonial opening of the line on the day before.) The second line was opened in December 1861 operating from St. Lawrence Market via King, Yonge and Queen Streets to the Queen Street Asylum at Ossington Avenue (then known as Dundas Street). By the end of 1861, the railway was operating 2 routes on 6 miles (10 km) of track using 70 horses (stabled in Yorkville) and carrying 2,000 passengers per day. The first two routes were initially single-track lines with passing loops. In 1862, the railway acquired the Williams Omnibus Bus Line.

In 1868, the railway was in financial difficulty and could not pay bond interest. Thus, it passed into the hands of the bondholders under an appointed trustee. In 1873, William and George Kiely acquired the railway and obtained a new act of incorporation under the old name. The new owners operated the railway until the end of the franchise in 1891.

=== Expansion (1874–1890) ===
In 1874, the tracks on King Street were extended east to the Don River and west to Bathurst Street, becoming the city's third streetcar route. Later in that year, double track was laid on Church Street from King Street to Front Street then west to York Street in order to serve steam railway stations. The Sherbourne line followed, running on Sherbourne Street from King Street north to Carlton Street, east to Parliament Street and north to Winchester Street. In 1878, tracks were laid on Spadina Avenue between King and College Streets. By 1879, both the Yonge and Queen lines were fully converted to double track.

In 1881, the King line was extended west to Strachan Avenue then south to Wellington Street. The portion south of King Street operated only during the Toronto Industrial Exhibition (today the Canadian National Exhibition) that took place annually at Exhibition Place. Also in 1881, the Church line was extended north from King Street to Bloor Street; a single track was laid on Winchester Street from Parliament to Sumach Street to serve the new nearby zoo; tracks were laid on Queen Street between Sherbourne and Parliament Streets.

In 1882, tracks were laid on Parliament Street from Queen Street to Gerrard Street, proceeding east on Gerrard to River Street. Tracks were also laid on Ossington Avenue (then considered part of Dundas Street) and west on Dundas to Dufferin Street, which was then at the city limits bordering Village of Brockton. The Queen route was created along Queen Street East with the completion of track between Yonge and Sherbourne Streets, and between Parliament and River Streets. Tracks were also laid along York Street between King and Queen Streets, and on McCaul Street between Queen and College Streets.

In 1883, after an agreement between the City and the University of Toronto to make College Street a public throughfare, tracks were laid on College from McCaul Street west to Spadina Avenue, and then north on Spadina to Bloor Street (the then-city limits). By this time, most streetcar routes terminated at or near St. Lawrence Market, the area being a major traffic source in the early 1880s. The TSR's complex of stables, carhouse and car shops was located nearby on Front Street.

In 1884, tracks on Yonge Street were extended south then west on Front Street to York Street. With this extension, every second Yonge car went to city's second Union Station, located west of York Street at Station Street, instead of St. Lawrence Market.

In 1885, track was laid on College Street between Yonge and McCaul Streets, on Bathurst Street between College and Bloor Streets, and on Dundas Street west to the new city limits (after the Village of Brockton had been annexed) at Lansdowne Avenue. The Yonge line was extended north from Scollard Street to Price Street at the Canadian Pacific Railway line; this extension displaced the tracks of the Metropolitan Street Railway. The Metropolitan had laid horsecar tracks there from 1881 to 1882, and still operated horsecar service north of the CPR line.

In 1886, track was extended on York Street south from King Street to Front Street; track was laid on Carlton Street between Yonge and Parliament Streets. After the city's annexation of the Village of Parkdale, the Queen line was extended west from Gladstone Avenue to Roncesvalles Avenue.

In 1887, the Queen line was extended 3.5 km (2.2 mi) east over the Don River through Leslieville to Woodbine Race Course. This displaced the Kingston Road Tramway, which since 1875 had a horsecar line running from the Don River east along Queen Street and Kingston Road, terminating at Main Street, and later at Blantyre Avenue from 1878. It ceased operation in 1887. Trams would return to Kingston Road in 1893 when the Toronto and Scarboro' Electric Railway, Light and Power Company opened a radial railway line along Kingston Road.

Also in 1887, the College Street tracks were expanded west from Bathurst Street to Dovercourt Road. In 1888, after the city's annexation of the Village of Dovercourt, the tracks were extended north on Dovercourt Road to Bloor Street.

In 1889, the Queen line was further extended east from Woodbine Race Course to Lee Avenue. Track was laid on Broadview Avenue between Queen Street and Danforth Avenue, on College Street between Dovercourt Road and Dufferin Street, and on King Street from Strachan Avenue to Dufferin Street. (Due to construction of a steam railway underpass, the latter would not open until after the TSR franchise expired in 1891.) Tracks were laid on Bloor Street between Yonge and Bathurst Streets, and on Bathurst Street between King and College Streets. In 1890, tracks on Bathurst Street were extended from Bloor Street to Dupont Street.

=== Final year (1891) ===
In early 1891, the final expansion occurred: tracks on Sherbourne Street were extended from Bloor Street over the Sherbourne bridge to South Drive in Rosedale, after which the city announced that it would not extend the TSR franchise.

By 1891, the last year of the franchise, the railway was carrying 55,000 passengers using 264 horsecars, 99 buses, 100 sleighs and 1,372 horses. The railway had 80.69 miles (129.86 km) of track and 68 miles (109 km) of routes.

By mutual agreement between the City and railway, the 30-year franchise expired on March 16, 1891. Because there was no transition agreement, the streetcar system shut down for the three following days. Streetcar service resumed on March 20, with the city as the operator. By an arbitrated agreement, the City paid the Toronto Street Railway Company $1,453,788 for the railway's assets. The City operated the system briefly, but soon elected to pass on the rights to a new company, the Toronto Railway Company, on September 1, 1891, for another thirty years under William Mackenzie and associates including George Kiely from the defunct Toronto Street Railway. The TRC agreed to pay the City $1,453,788 plus a percentage of gross receipts for the franchise.

The City required the TRC to electrify the horsecar lines within three years. The first electric cars were run on August 15, 1892, and horsecars were last operated on August 31, 1894. As part of the conversion from horse to electric traction, the TRC had replaced all the horsecar tracks with heavier rails to handle the faster, heavier electric streetcars.

== Track gauge ==
The Toronto Street Railway created Toronto's unique gauge that is still used today by the Toronto streetcar system and 3 lines of the Toronto subway. However, the original Toronto gauge may have been 4 feet 11 inches (1,499 mm), slightly wider than today's 4 ft 10 7/8 in (1,495 mm). When the Toronto Railway Company took over the horsecar system of the Toronto Street Railway in 1891, its charter mentioned a gauge of 4 feet 11 inches (1,499 mm)

The 1861 agreement between the City of Toronto and the Toronto Street Railway stated:

That the gauge of the said railways shall be such that the ordinary vehicles now in use may travel on the said tracks, and that it shall and may be lawful to and for all and every person and persons whatsoever to travel upon and use the said tracks with their vehicles loaded or empty, when and so often as they may please, provided they do not impede or interfere with the cars of the party of the second part (Toronto Street Railway), running thereon, and subject at all times to the right of the said party of the second part, his executors, and administrators and assigns to keep the said tracks with his and their cars, when meeting or overtaking any other vehicle thereon.

As wagons were normally built at standard gauge, the streetcar rails were selected to be slightly wider, allowing the wagons to ride on the inside sections of the rail, and the streetcars on the outside. The Williams Omnibus Bus Line changed the gauge of their buses in 1861 to fit this gauge.

Ken Heard, Consultant Museologist, Canadian Museums Association, was reported to say:

One of the terms of these agreements was that the track gauge was to accommodate wagons. As horse car rail was step rail, the horse cars, equipped with iron wheels with flanges on the inside, ran on the outer, or upper step of the rail. Wagon wheels naturally did not have a flange. They were made of wood, with an iron tire. Wagons would use the inner, or lower step of the rail. The upper step of the rail guided the wagons on the track. In order to accommodate this arrangement, the track gauge had to be 4 feet, 11 inches. As the streets themselves were not paved, this arrangement permitted wagons carrying heavy loads a stable roadbed.

== Routes ==
Routes with "Transferred to City" in the "Ended" column were operating on May 20, 1891, when the Toronto Street Railway Company's franchise expired and had their operations taken over by the City of Toronto.

Route	Started	Ended	Notes
Bathurst	September 1889	December 7, 1889	To "Seaton Village"
Bloor	May 29, 1891	Transferred to City	
Brockton	September 4, 1883	May 1884	From "Queen & Brockton"; to "Queen & Brockton"
Carlton & College	August 2, 1886	Transferred to City	
Church	August 18, 1881	Transferred to City	
Danforth	July 8, 1889	Transferred to City	
Davenport	August 18, 1890	Transferred to City	From "Seaton Village"
Dovercourt via McCaul	September 24, 1888	Transferred to City	From "McCaul & College"
Front & McCaul	October 22, 1883	June 28, 1884	To "McCaul & College"
Front & Parliament	November 25, 1878	July 25, 1881	To "Parliament" and "Winchester"
High Park via Queen	April 1887	Transferred to City	From "Queen & Parkdale"
King	September 21, 1874	Transferred to City	Longest continuously operated route in Toronto
King via Strachan	September 2, 1879	September 19, 1890	During Toronto Industrial Exhibition only; to "King"
Kingston Rd.	June 9, 1875	April 1887	Kingston Road Tramway Co.; by this date; part to "Woodbine"
Lee	July 15, 1889	Transferred to City	
McCaul & College	June 30, 1884	September 22, 1888	From "Front & McCaul"; to "Dovercourt via McCaul"
McCaul & College	July 15, 1889	Transferred to City	From "Dovercourt via McCaul"
Metropolitan	January 26, 1885	Transferred to City	Metropolitan Street Railway
Parliament	July 26, 1881	Transferred to City	to City from "Front & Parliament"
Queen	February 2, 1861	December 7, 1881	to "Queen & Brockton"
Queen	September 4, 1883	May 1884	From "Queen & Brockton"; to "Queen & Brockton"
Queen & Brockton	December 8, 1881	September 3, 1883	From "Queen"; to "Queen & Brockton"
Queen & Brockton	May 1884	Transferred to City	From "Brockton" and "Queen"
Queen & Parkdale	September 2, 1879	April 1887	Ended by Q2 1887; to "High Park via Queen"
Queen East	May 11, 1885	Transferred to City	From "Sherbourne"
Seaton Village	July 27, 1885	Transferred to City	From "Spadina & Bathurst"
Sherbourne	December 1, 1874	Transferred to City	May have begun a day or two earlier
Spadina	June 1879	Transferred to City	
Spadina & Bathurst	June 30, 1884	July 25, 1885	From "Spadina"; to "Seaton Village"
Toronto Industrial Exhibition	September 13, 1883	September 19, 1890	First electric route; operated by steam during the 1891 season
Winchester	July 26, 1881	Transferred to City	From "Front & Parliament"
Woodbine	May 21, 1887	Transferred to City	From "Kingston Rd."
Yonge	November 9, 1861	Transferred to City	First rail transit route in Toronto

== Roster ==
In the first year, the TSR had only 11 horsecars on the roster. Before the end of the franchise, the TSR had 262 cars, 100 omnibuses, 100 sleighs and 1,356 horses. Among the horsecar manufacturers were John Stephenson Company of New York, New York, Jones Car Company and the shops of the Toronto Street Railway. Horsecars could be open or closed vehicles, and require one or two horses to pull, depending on car length. The sleighs (all closed vehicles) were built by Thomas Speight Wagon Works of Markham Village, Ontario

Summary of horsecar roster
Type	Length	Seats	Horses required	Fleet
Closed	10 ft (3.0 m)	12	1	92
Closed	12 ft (3.7 m)	14	1	12
Closed	16 ft (4.9 m)	22	2	102
Open	20 ft (6.1 m)	50	2	56

=== Closed cars ===
Closed horsecars were short, 10 ft (3.0 m) to 16 ft (4.9 m) feet in length, and had four wheels bolted to their bodies. Straw was placed on the floor to provide warmth in winter. There was a small coal oil lamp at one end of the car for both interior and exterior lighting at night. Larger cars had a conductor to collect fares using a hand-held box; on smaller one-man cars, a fare box was mounted on the wall by the driver. The driver had to stand on an open platform with no windshield.

=== Disposition ===
After the Toronto Railway Company completed electrification, most of the horsecars were scrapped. Some were converted into trailers hauled by a motor car, but the old horsecars were found to be unsuited for the higher speed of electric streetcar operation. The TRC repurposed two horsecars, 13 and 16, as offices at Exhibition Loop. They were both inherited by the Toronto Transportation Commission in 1921 which scrapped horsecar 12 but retained horsecar 16 as a historic relic. In 1945, car 16 participated in a parade pulled by two horses on the tracks of the Queen streetcar line. In 1968, the TTC donated the horsecar to the Canada Science and Technology Museum in Ottawa.

Car 16 was built in 1874 by the John Stephenson Company of New York City. It was used throughout the network of the Toronto Street Railway. It sat 16 passengers and could be pulled by one or two horses. According to historian Trevor Parkins-Sciberras, if the tram was overloaded, the horses would refuse to haul it.

== Facilities ==
The TSR had separate facilities for horses versus vehicles with the exception of the King stables, which had storage space for buses.

Stables
Facility	Location	Opened	Notes
Yorkville stables	Scollard Street	1861	Located behind Yorkville town hall, the stables were enlarged several times between 1861 and 1889, and consisted of 5 buildings providing 224 stalls. A track curving from Yorkville Avenue passed through an archway in the town hall building to the stables behind. Between 1861 and 1879, the TSR rented office space at the town hall. Sometime between 1879 and 1883, the facility ceased to store horsecars. In 1891, the stables held 213 horses. In 1892, the Toronto Railway Company demolished the stables in order to construct its Yorkville Carhouse.
George Street stables	Front & George Streets	1881	The three-storey building had 459 stalls over 3 floors: 227 stalls on the first floor, 216 on the second and 20 on the third. The building held 432 horses in 1891. It was destroyed by fire in 1902.
King stables	King & St. Lawrence Streets, SE corner	1885	The stables had 254 stalls and held 216 horses in 1891. The loft could store 30 buses.
Frederick Street stables	Front & Frederick Streets, SE corner	1888	The stables had 588 stalls and held 495 horses in 1891. Since 1977, the Young People's Theatre has occupied this building.

Car shops and carhouses
Facility	Location	Opened	Notes
Car shops	Front & Frederick Streets, NW corner	1882	The building had shops capable of building new cars and could store up to 38 cars on each of its three floors. An electric elevator moved cars between street level and the upper floors. After 1889, the building was used only for car building and repairs. The building was demolished in 1979 and condo towers (25 George and 160 Frederick) stand on the site.
Front Street carhouse	Front Street south side, east side of Frederick Street stables	1883	The carhouse could store 100 buses or sleighs on the ground level and 52 cars on each of its second and third levels. There was a hoist to move cars to the upper levels. The TRC used it as a stores building. The building was closed by the TTC in 1924 when the Hillcrest Complex opened, and it was demolished in 1928.
King carhouse	King & St. Lawrence Streets, east of stables	1886	The carhouse could hold 32 cars on each of its two levels, and had an electric hoist. The nearby stables could store 30 buses. There was also a south lot that could hold 35 more buses.

== Operations ==
Every two hours, horses hauling streetcars had to be changed. If the horsecar was overloaded, the horse would often refuse to pull it, and passengers would be asked to help push the car.

Drivers and conductors worked shifts of 11 to 12 hours per day, and were paid 15 cents per hour. The driver had to work on an open platform exposed to the elements. In winter, the driver was allowed to stand in a box full of straw to keep the feet warm.

Open cars were run only on warm days. If there was rain, open cars would be replaced by closed cars when the horses needed to be changed. At the three-story Front Street carhouse, a lift would bring replacement cars down to street level, and carry up the cars being replaced. If the weather changed later in the day, the process would be repeated.

When snowy conditions threatened, two horses would be assigned to each one-horse car. Work gangs would attempt to shovel the tracks clear of snow. If the tracks became unusable, horsecars were replaced by buses fitted with runners and by sleighs. Replacing larger horsecars required more buses and sleighs, and some of the conductors would become drivers; other conductors would act as fare collectors posted at busy locations.

== See also ==
- Metropolitan Street Railway which operated a horsecar line in then-suburban North Toronto from 1885 until the line's conversion to electric trams in 1890.
- List of Ontario railways
- List of defunct Canadian railways

Preceded by Williams Omnibus Bus Line	Public Transit in Toronto; 1861–1891	Succeeded by Toronto Railway Company
