= Toronto Railway Company =

Streetcar operator in Toronto, Canada, between 1891 and 1921

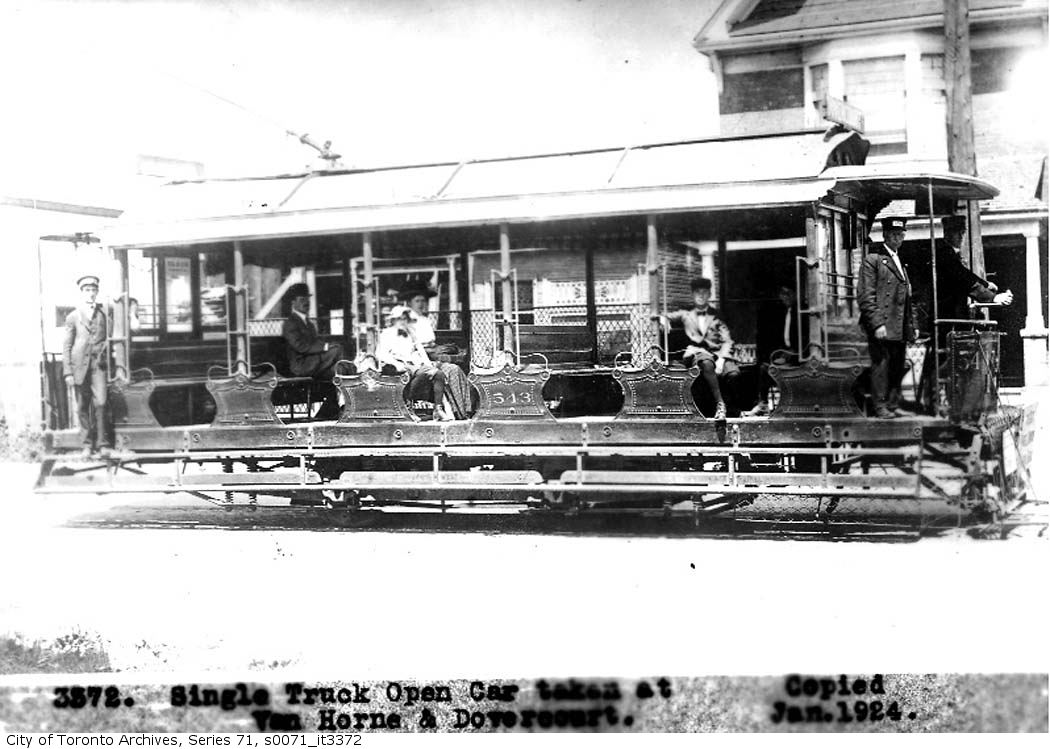
- Single-truck open car on Dovercourt route, 1899

Overview
- Headquarters: Toronto, Ontario
- Locale: Toronto, Ontario
- Dates of operation: 1891–1921
- Predecessor: Toronto Street Railway
- Successor: Toronto Transportation Commission

Technical
- Track gauge: 4 ft 10 7/8 in (1,495 mm) Toronto gauge

The Toronto Railway Company (TRC) was the operator of the streetcar system in Toronto between 1891 and 1921. It electrified the horsecar system it inherited from the Toronto Street Railway, the previous operator of streetcar service in Toronto. The TRC was also a manufacturer of streetcars and rail work vehicles, a few of which were built for other streetcar and radial operators.

On August 15, 1892, the TRC became the second operator of horse-drawn streetcars in the Toronto area to convert to electric trams, the first being the Metropolitan Street Railway which electrified its horsecar line along Yonge Street within the Town of North Toronto on September 1, 1890. (In 1912, the City of Toronto would annex North Toronto.)

== History ==
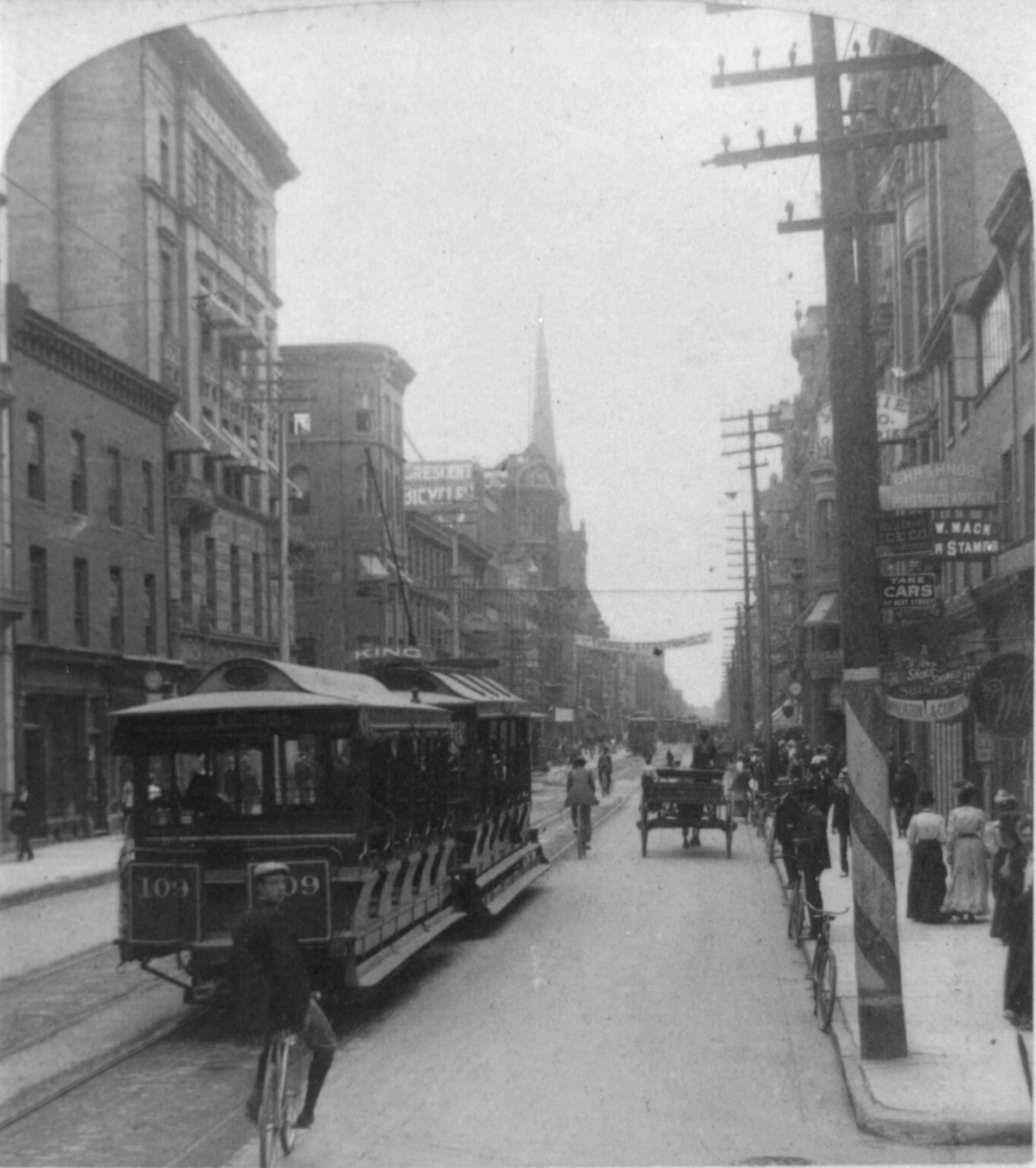
TRC streetcars on King Street in 1900

In 1891, the 30-year franchise with the Toronto Street Railway (TSR) for horsecar service expired. At the end of the TSR franchise, the city ran the horsecar system for eight months, but ended up granting another 30-year franchise to a private operator, a group involving railway entrepreneur William Mackenzie. The franchise, which involved converting the horsecar system to electric operation, went into effect on September 21, 1891.

The TRC made a one-time payment to the city of $1,453,788 for the assets of the TSR, the same amount the city paid for TSR assets when it took over the horsecar system in 1891. Each year, the TRC was required to pay the city $800 per mile of track, plus a percentage of the gross earnings.

Fares were: five cents cash for adults, six tickets for twenty-five cents; three cents cash for children with school tickets at ten for twenty-five cents; ten cents cash for night streetcars. The fare entitled the rider to a free transfer between routes.

A key requirement of the franchise agreement was that the TRC had to electrify the first line within one year of the beginning of the franchise and the last line within three years. The TRC met this requirement. The first run of an electric car was on August 10, 1892. Car 270 ran from the Frederick Street stables at Front Street, up Church Street, along Bloor Street and Sherbourne Street to Rosedale. The first passenger was a half-sober gentleman who insisted he had the right to board the streetcar at the Metropolitan United Church and pay his fare.

The first electric car ran in scheduled service on Church Street starting August 15, 1892, and the last horse car ran on McCaul Street on August 31, 1894.

From 1893 to 1904, the TRC had suburban radial operations, often using vehicles resembling streetcars. In 1893, the TRC took control of the Toronto and Mimico Electric Railway and Light Company along Lake Shore Road, and in 1895, the Toronto and Scarboro' Electric Railway, Light and Power Company along Kingston Road. In 1904, both suburban operations were turned over to the Toronto and York Radial Railway, thus ending the TRC's suburban operations.

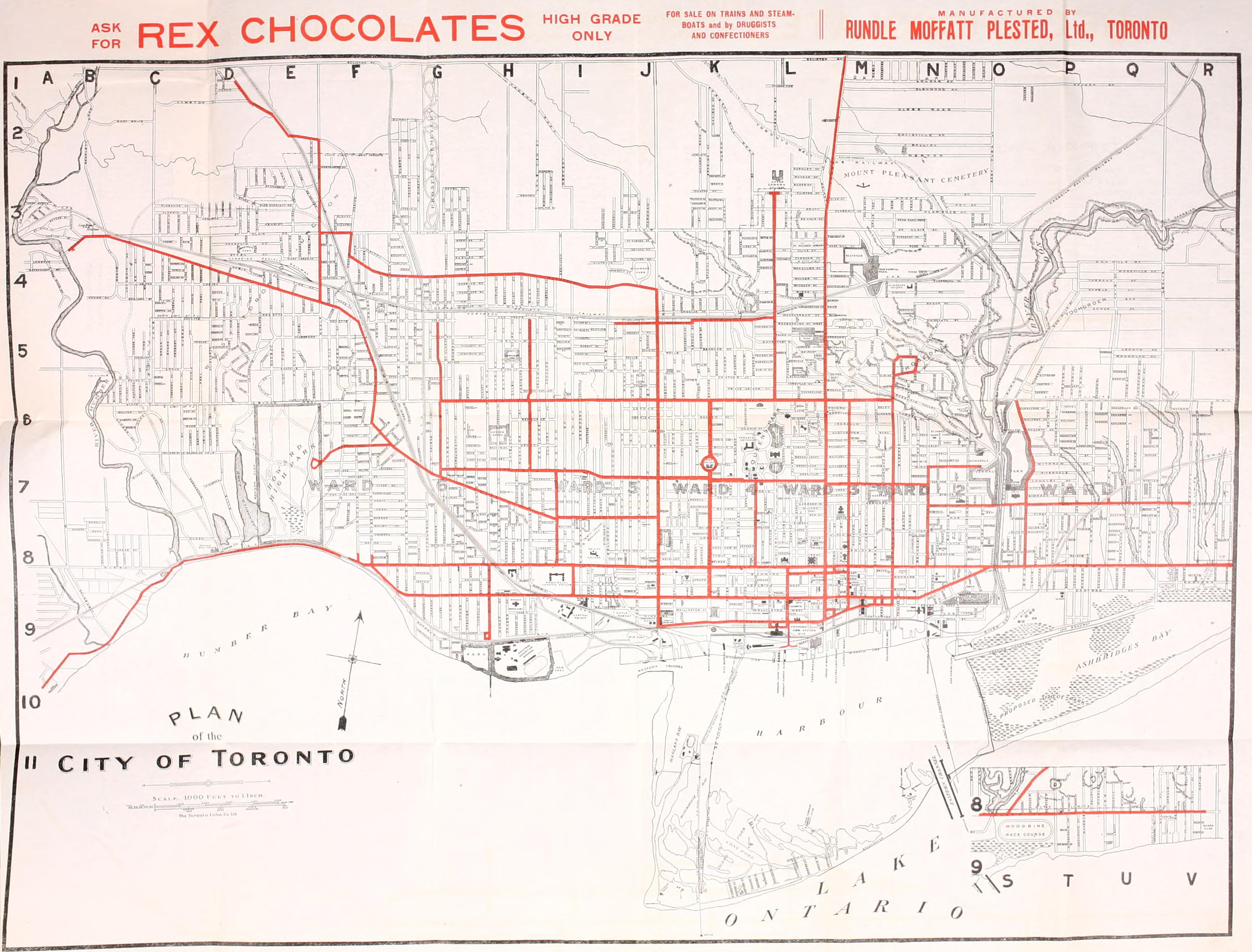
Map of Toronto streetcar routes in 1912

On May 23, 1897, Sunday streetcar service started after city voters gave approval in a referendum earlier that month. This was controversial at the time; churches feared Sunday streetcar service would lead to other activities inappropriate for a Sunday such as sporting events and the sale of alcoholic beverages. The referendum, which had been preceded by two prior unsuccessful attempts, was won by a narrow margin of 0.7 per cent out of 32,000 votes cast.

There came to be problems with interpretation of the franchise terms for the city. A series of annexations, especially in 1908–12, significantly extended the city limits to include such areas as Dovercourt, Earlscourt, East Toronto, Midway (formerly between Toronto and East Toronto), North Toronto, and West Toronto. After many attempts to force the TRC to serve these areas, the city created its own street railway operation, the Toronto Civic Railways to do so, and built several routes.

The TRC system deteriorated towards the end of the franchise. By 1915, there were complaints of overcrowding due to a shortage of streetcars. In December 1916, a fire destroyed the TRC's King carhouse and 163 motor cars and trailers within it. Repeated court battles did force the TRC to build new cars, but far less than what the city was requesting, and the new cars were of an old design dating from 1906, or 1908 for the newest cars. Streetcars and track were not well maintained, and carhouses and shops were obsolete or deteriorating. The TRC franchise ended on August 31, 1921, and the next day, the Toronto Transportation Commission started operating a system that combined the TRC system with the city-operated Toronto Civic Railways lines. In 1924, the city paid $11,483,500 for the assets of the TRC. The TRC ceased to exist when it was legally dissolved in 1930.

=== Track ===
In 1891, the TRC inherited 109 kilometres (68 mi) of horsecar track from its predecessor, the Toronto Street Railway. The TRC learned from the troubled experiences of the Metropolitan Street Railway in North Toronto, which had previously done a horse to electric conversion. Thus, between 1891 and 1894, the TRC replaced all the horsecar track, using heavier rail that could properly support the faster, heavier electric streetcars. The TRC used 69-pound rail on some lightly used lines, and 71-pound rail elsewhere, including all downtown track.

For parallel tracks on the horsecar system, the distance between the tracks (the devil strip) was 3 feet (910 mm); the TRC widened the devil strip to 3 feet 10 inches (1,170 mm). Until 1908, the city prohibited the TRC from making the devil strip wider. Because of the narrow devil strip, later cars were built with a taper to the roof on the passing side, and car bodies were offset to the right by four inches, sitting off-centre on the king pin. The offset allowed a wider car to safely pass another traveling in the opposite direction. From 1903, the TRC built all new track with a devil strip of 5 feet 4 inches (1,630 mm). In 1921, there was still 27 kilometres (17 mi) of double track with a narrow devil strip which the successor TTC widened as it replaced old TRC tracks to handle wider equipment.

== Routes ==
Routes marked to TTC were operating on September 21, 1921, when the Toronto Railway Company's operations were taken over by the Toronto Transportation Commission. Routes marked 1923 by TTC were TRC routes discontinued by the TTC as a result of a major reorganization of routes on July 1, 1923.

Route	Started	Ended	Notes
Arthur	February 12, 1902	1909	Merged with Dundas route
Ashbridge	November 5, 1917	Transferred to TTC	Replaced by bus service in the 1920s.
Avenue Road	September 2, 1895	Transferred to TTC	
Bathurst	July 27, 1885	Transferred to TTC	
Belt Line	November 16, 1891	1923 by TTC	
Bloor	1889	Transferred to TTC	
Broadview	October 1892	1923 by TTC	
Brockton	1882	October 9, 1893	Renamed Dundas
Carlton	August 1886	Transferred to TTC	
Church	1881	Transferred to TTC	
College	November 1893	Transferred to TTC	
Danforth	May 1889	October 1892	Renamed Broadview
Davenport	December 1892	November 1891	Replaced by Bathurst, Parliament and Winchester routes
Dovercourt	November 1888	Transferred to TTC	
Dufferin	1889	September 30, 1891	Merged with Danforth route
Dundas	October 9, 1893	Transferred to TTC	
Dupont	August 29, 1906	Transferred to TTC	
Harbord	August 29, 1911	Transferred to TTC	
High Park	1886	1905	
King	1874	Transferred to TTC	
Lee Avenue	1889	May 15, 1893	Merged into King route
McCaul	October 1883	January 1, 1896	Replaced by Bloor route
Parkdale	1880	1886	Renamed High Park
Parliament	1881	March 4, 1918	Merged into Queen route
Queen	December 2, 1861	Transferred to TTC	
Queen East	1882	October 16, 1891	Merged with Danforth route
Roncesvalles	1909	December 20, 1911	Replaced by Queen route
Seaton Village	July 27, 1885	October 23, 1891	Replaced by Davenport, Parliament and Winchester routes
Sherbourne	November 1874	November 16, 1891	Merged into Belt Line route
Spadina	1878	November 16, 1891	Merged into Belt Line route
Winchester	November 1874	Transferred to TTC	
Woodbine	May 1887	April 4, 1893	Replaced by King route
Yonge	September 11, 1861	Transferred to TTC	
York			In operation in October 1891 and discontinued prior to December 31, 1891

=== City-owned tracks ===
The city built and owned some of the streetcar trackage operated by the TRC. The city-owned, TRC-operated tracks were:

- Queen Street East between Maclean Avenue and Neville Park Boulevard.
- The portion of the Yonge streetcar line between the CPR line and Woodlawn Avenue built in 1916, to replace Metropolitan radial tracks that the city ripped up over a franchise dispute.
- A private right-of-way from Bathurst and Front streets through Fort York to the Exhibition Place, built in 1916.
- The Ashbridge line in 1917, running south from Queen Street via Don Roadway, then west on Commissioners Street to Charry Street, to serve workers at munitions factories: Unlike other routes at the time, the Ashbridge line had no loops or wyes, and required double-ended streetcars.
- Tracks over the Prince Edward Viaduct between Sherbourne Street and Broadview Avenue, in 1918.

=== Subway ===
By 1909, there were proposals to build subways in competition to the TRC's surface streetcar lines. At this time the city was unhappy with the quality of TRC service and with the TRC's refusal to serve newly annexed areas. The TRC had an exclusive franchise for surface streetcars but competing subways would not violate the franchise.

In 1909, a British syndicate proposed two lines, one under Yonge Street and a second from East Toronto via Queen Street East, Dufferin Street and Dundas Street West to West Toronto. Voters supported this proposal in a referendum during the 1910 election, but also elected a mayor who opposed it. Thus, this proposal died.

By 1912, there was a second city proposal to build three underground routes: streetcar tunnels under Queen and Bloor Streets, and a rapid transit subway along Yonge Street. These routes would have connected with surface streetcar routes and radial railways. The idea died after voters rejected the proposal out of fear of higher taxes.

== Roster ==
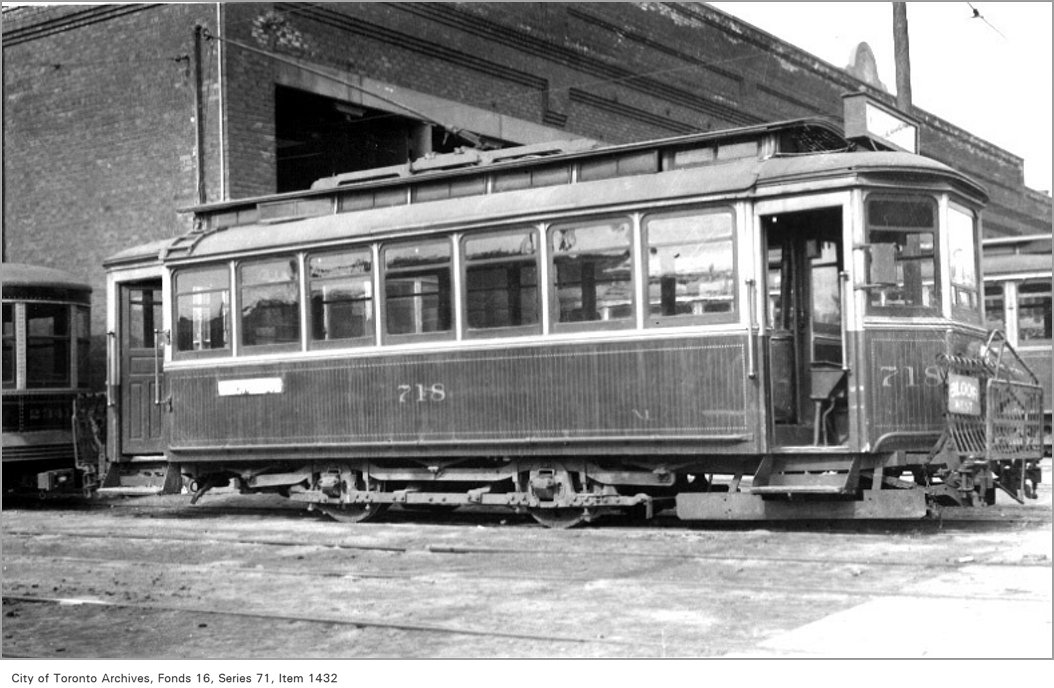
TRC single-truck streetcar

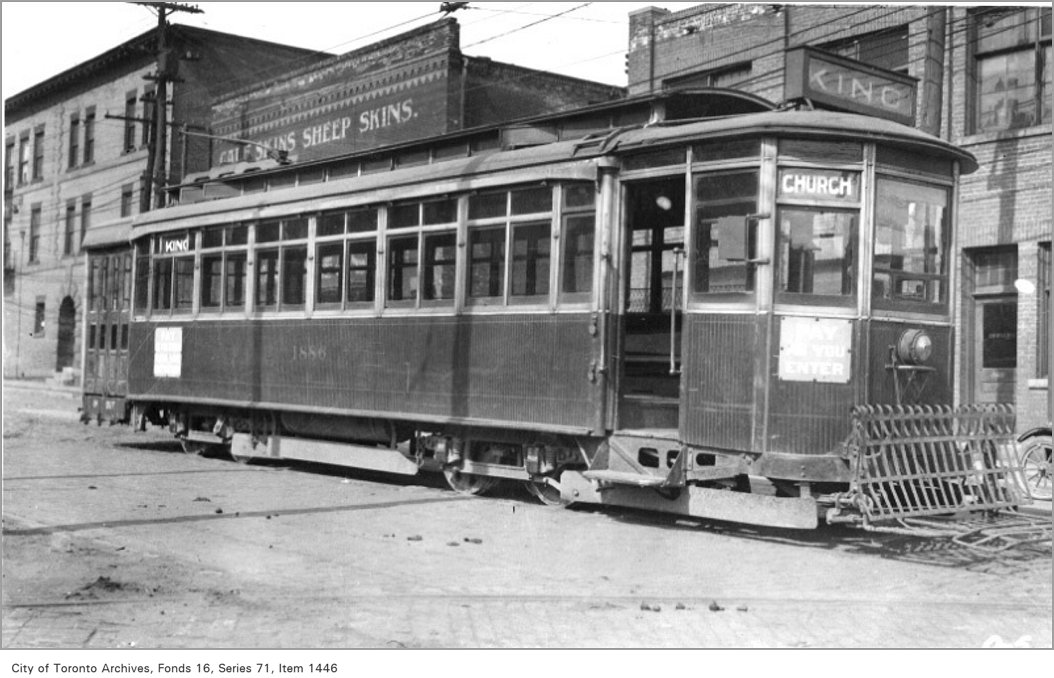
TRC double-truck streetcar

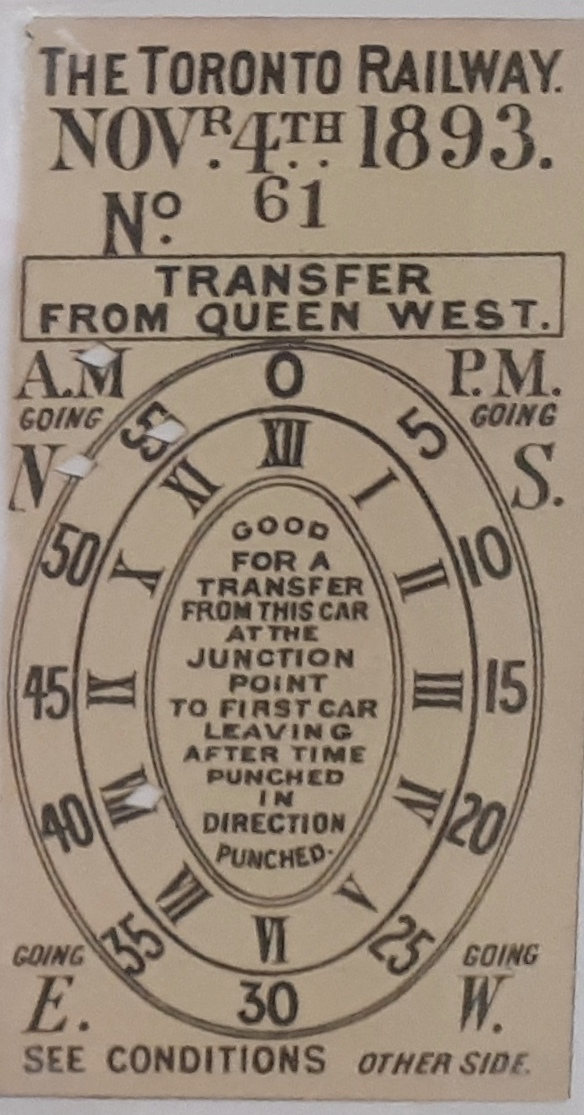
Toronto Railway ticket from November 1893

As part of the franchise agreement, the TRC was to build all its streetcars locally. Thus, almost all TRC cars were built in-house at their car shops at Front and Frederick Streets. However, the TRC felt it lacked the capacity to build enough streetcars to convert the horsecar system it inherited to electrical operation by the city-imposed deadline. Thus, the city granted the TRC an exception to purchase ten single-ended, single-truck streetcars from James Crossen-Cobourg Car Works in Cobourg, Ontario in 1893.

The TRC streetcars were made of wood over a steel underframe. Cars had a clerestory roof with a destination sign fixed near the front edge of the roof. Seats were wood slat but the TRC provided each with a seating cushion. There was a stove at the front of the car for winter heating. Early streetcars had open platforms; later cars had enclosed vestibules. The rear vestibule could have a single or double rear door. Cars with a double rear door could haul a trailer and had a two-man crew. One-man cars had a treadle-operated single rear door. There was a hook at the rear of each car to hang a baby carriage.

At first, TRC streetcars had hand brakes, but in 1905, a Torontonian developed an air brake for streetcars. Initially, streetcars did not carry an air compressor; thus, air recharging stations were required along streetcar routes. Later, on-board air compressors were installed.

After the TRC completed electrification, some horsecars were converted into trailers where one or two would be hauled by a motor car. However, horsecar trailers were found to be unsuited for the higher speed of electric streetcar operation.

Very early on, in 1894, the TRC decided on single-ended operation. Many of the early streetcars were "open" cars, where there was benches across the width of the car and thus no centre aisle. Passengers had to board on the curb-side of the open car, and for safety, there had to be a barrier along the length of the car on the opposite side. Before the summer of 1893, there were double-ended open cars, which required two men to move the barrier to the other side of the car at the end of the line. Some open cars had one-man crews, requiring a helper to be stationed at the end of the line. Having single-ended cars with loops or wyes saved staff time. Also, both open and closed motor cars could pull one or two trailers; thus, single-ended operation eliminated the time needed to rearrange the consist at the end of the line.

Open cars were popular in warm weather. When it rained, there were side curtains that one could unroll from the roof to keep one dry. However, the motorman would stand exposed to wind and rain on the front platform. To handle both warm and colder months, the TSR used the "convertible car" in which the nearside of the car could be removed in the spring, and re-connected in the fall, thus changing from an open car to a closed car. A dangerous feature of open cars was the running board where passengers could stand while the car was in motion. Because of safety concerns, the Railway and Municipal Board banned open cars from the streets on November 22, 1915.

At the end of its franchise in 1921, the TRC had 830 streetcars on its active roster that the city agreed to accept along with a number of work cars. It also had 18 open motors and 43 open trailers in storage which the city refused to accept due to the 1915 ban on open streetcars. In 1921, the TRC had twelve double-ended streetcars, three double-truck and nine single-truck; all other streetcars were single-ended. Two of the ten Crossan-built, single-truck streetcars survived to 1921. Between 1921 and 1924, the TTC retired 471 of the 830 streetcars the city accepted from the TRC, including the double-ended and Crossan-built streetcars. It retained only 351 single-end, double-track motor cars for longer term use, the last of which were retired in 1951. The TTC did retain one horsecar trailer and a single-ended streetcar from 1892, preserving them as relics ultimately to be given to a museum.

=== Roster summaries ===
The following are summaries of the TRC roster at four points during its franchise:

Summary of roster as of January 27, 1897
Type	Closed	Open	Total
Motor cars	177	60	237
Trailers	100	77	177
Total units	237	177	414

Summary of roster as of December 31, 1904
Type	Closed	Open	Total
DT motor cars	91	20	111
ST motor cars	243	195	438
Trailers	73	93	166
Totals	407	308	715

Summary of roster as of August 8, 1907
Type	Closed	Open	Total
Motor cars	401	209	610
Trailers	75	93	168
Totals	476	302	778

Summary of roster as of August 31, 1921
DT motor	ST motor	Trailer	Total
475	234	121	830

=== Work cars ===
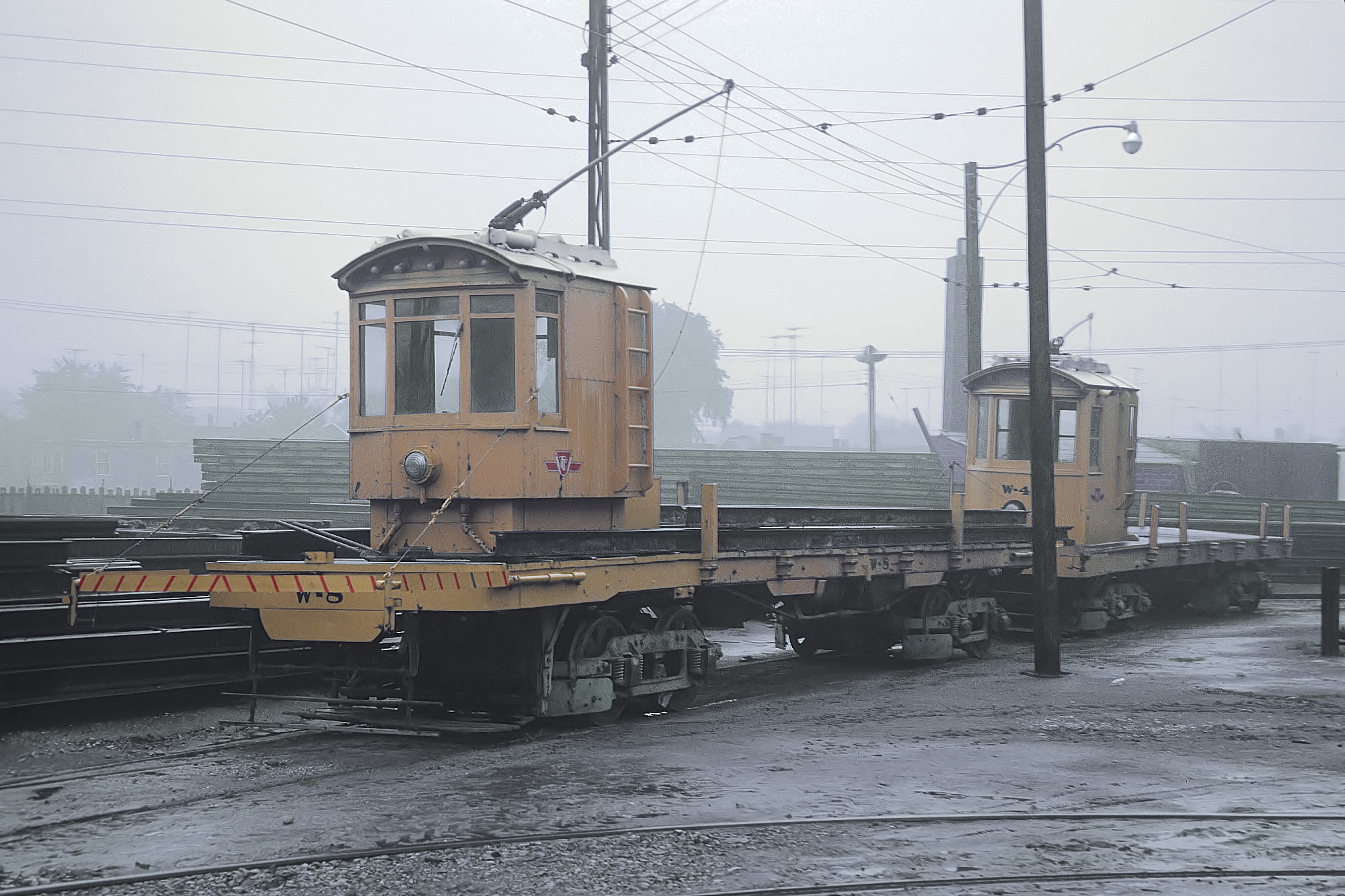
TTC W-8 and W-4 (ex-TRC construction cars 8 and 4) at Hillcrest, 1965

The TRC had several types of work cars, all built in the TRC car shops. Here is a brief description of some of the types of non-revenue cars the TRC had:

- Construction cars were single-ended, double-truck motorized flat cars with an enclosed operator cab used to deliver rails to carhouses and yards. The TTC inherited four of them (numbers 2, 4, 7, 8) keeping their TRC numbers but prefixing them with a "W-". Today, W-4 is preserved at the Halton County Radial Railway museum.
- Crane car no. 1, built in 1913, was a flat motor with a cab and a five-ton hoist crane. It supported construction projects. Renamed TTC C-1, the crane car was at the Halton County Radial Railway museum as of 1973.
- Supply car no. 3, built in 1913, delivered motors and wheels between the motor shops and carhouses. It was essentially a flat motor with cab and an open cargo section behind the cab lined with low side walls.
- Emergency car no. 5 was a single-truck, box motor, and carried a variety of tools to handle emergency tasks. The TTC retained this car until 1933.
- Compressor cars no. 1 and no. 2 were mobile air recharging stations for streetcars before they were equipped with their own on-board air compressors. Both were box motors; no. 1 had a single truck; no. 2 was double-truck. No. 2 had a varied career with the TTC; it was converted into an express freight motor for the Lake Simcoe line in 1927, then as snow plow TP-2 in 1936, then as subway rail maintenance car RT-1 for the Yonge subway.
- The TRC's private car was built in 1892 on a single truck car then rebuilt as a double-truck car in 1904. It had 12 chairs, carpeting, window curtains, hardwood trim, and curved windows at the front vestibule. It carried officials for inspections and special events, including trips to Old Woodbine Race Course where the TRC had a streetcar siding into the grounds. From 1912, its use declined with increased use of automobiles. The city reluctantly accepted this car at the end of the TRC franchise, but the TTC stored it unused until it was scrapped in 1931.
- Fare box car no. 28, built in 1911, somewhat resembled a passenger car, but had a freight door in the middle. It collected and distributed fare boxes, and delivered tickets and change to the carhouses. The TTC retained this car but replaced it in 1938 with an armoured car.
- The TRC built 17 snow sweepers between 1892 and 1918. The TTC inherited all 17 prefixing their TRC numbers with "S-", thus S-1 to S-17. All were scrapped between 1946 and 1948.
- The TRC built eight sprinkler cars between 1892 and 1909. Sprinklers 1 to 3 had a vertical water tank on a single-truck frame. Sprinklers 4 to 8 had horizontal tanks on a double-track frame. All such cars had operator controls on an open front platform. The TRC had a contract from the city between 1892 and 1915 to flush streets along streetcar lines. In 1915, the city started to use rubber-tire trucks.
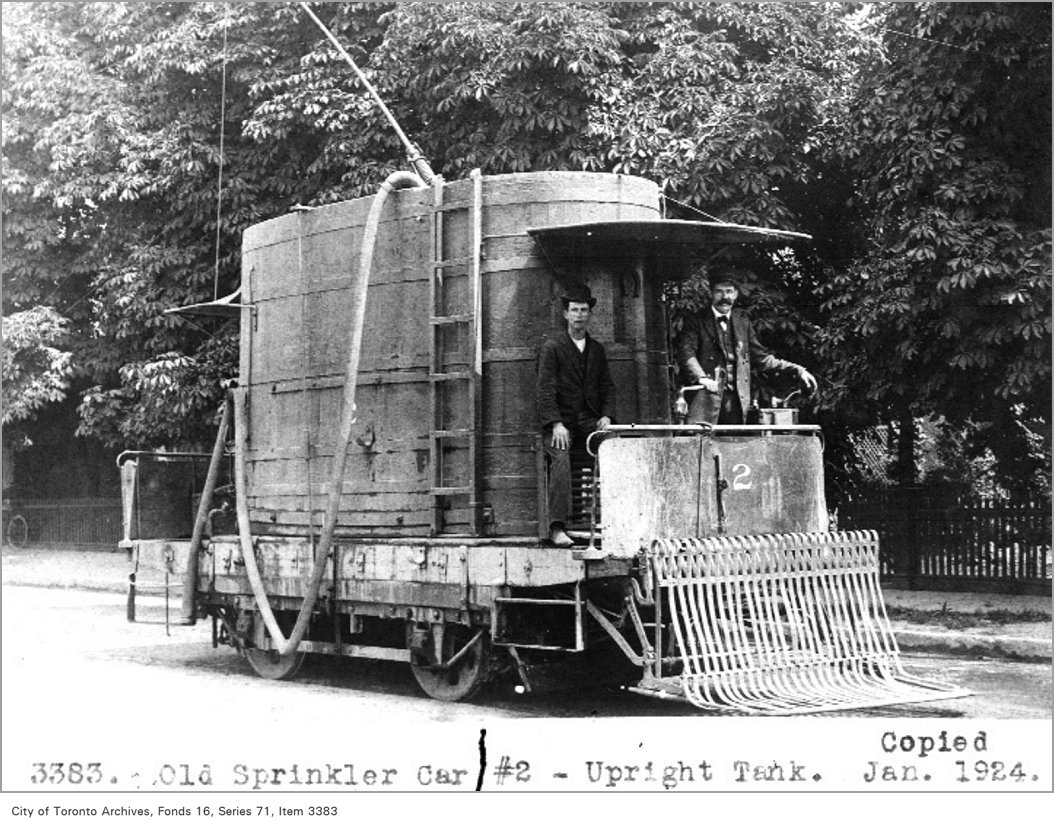
Sprinkler car with upright water tank

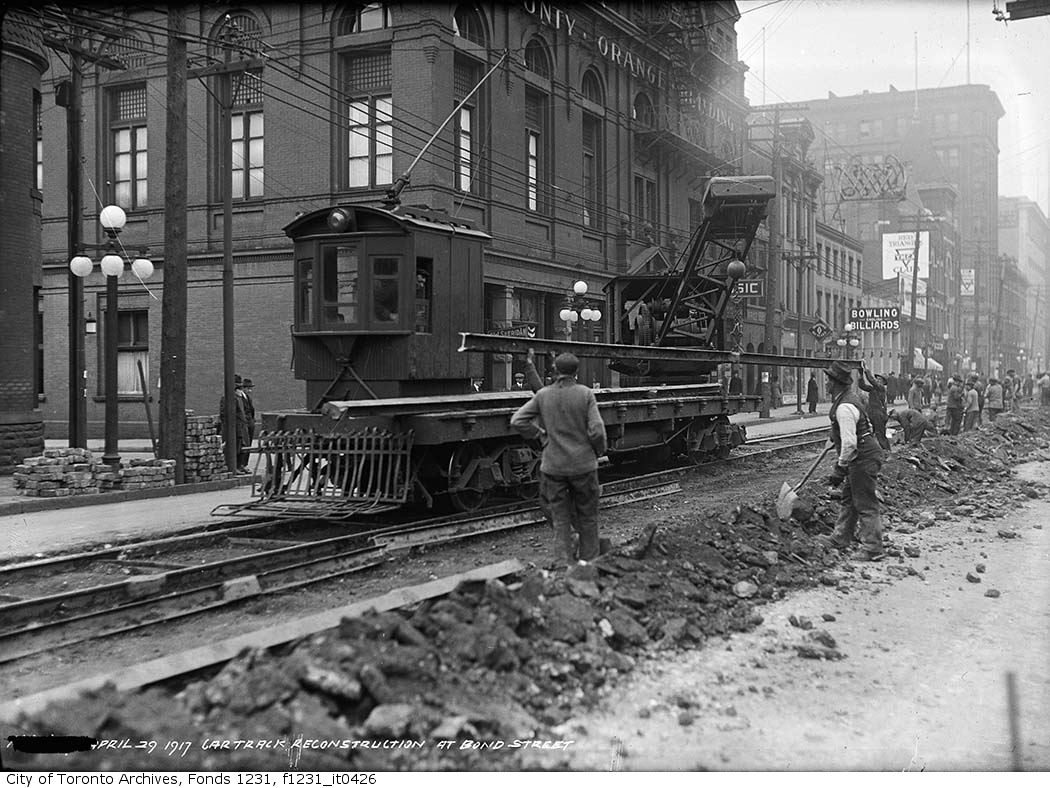
Crane car no. 1 placing rails at Queen and Bond streets (April 29, 1917)

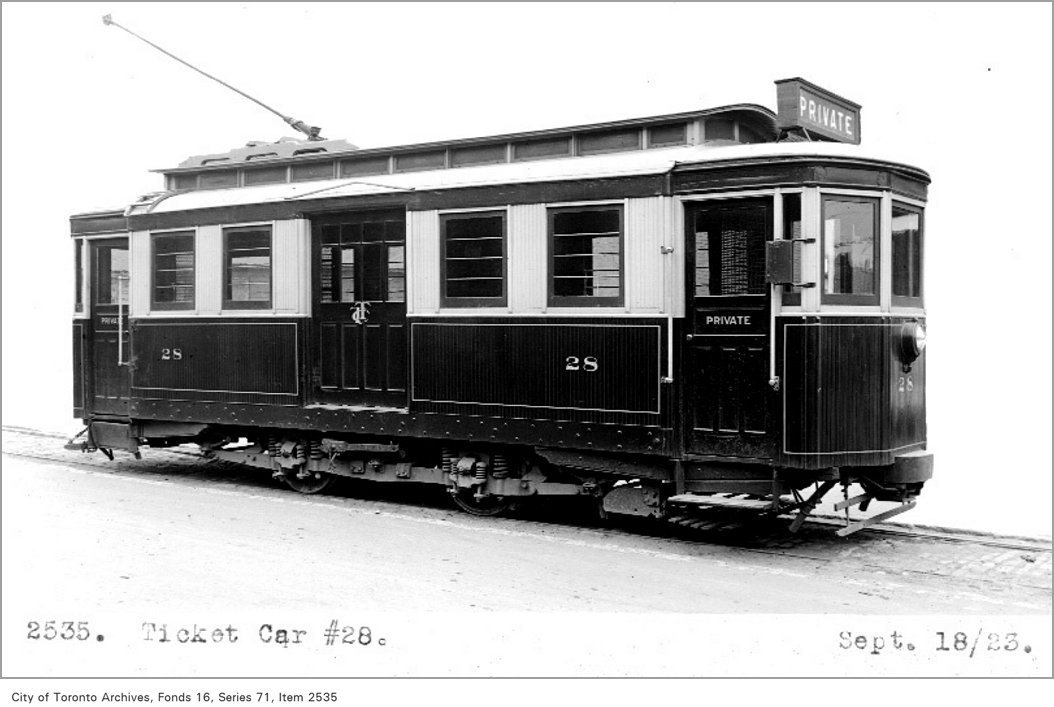
TTC (ex-TRC) fare box car 28

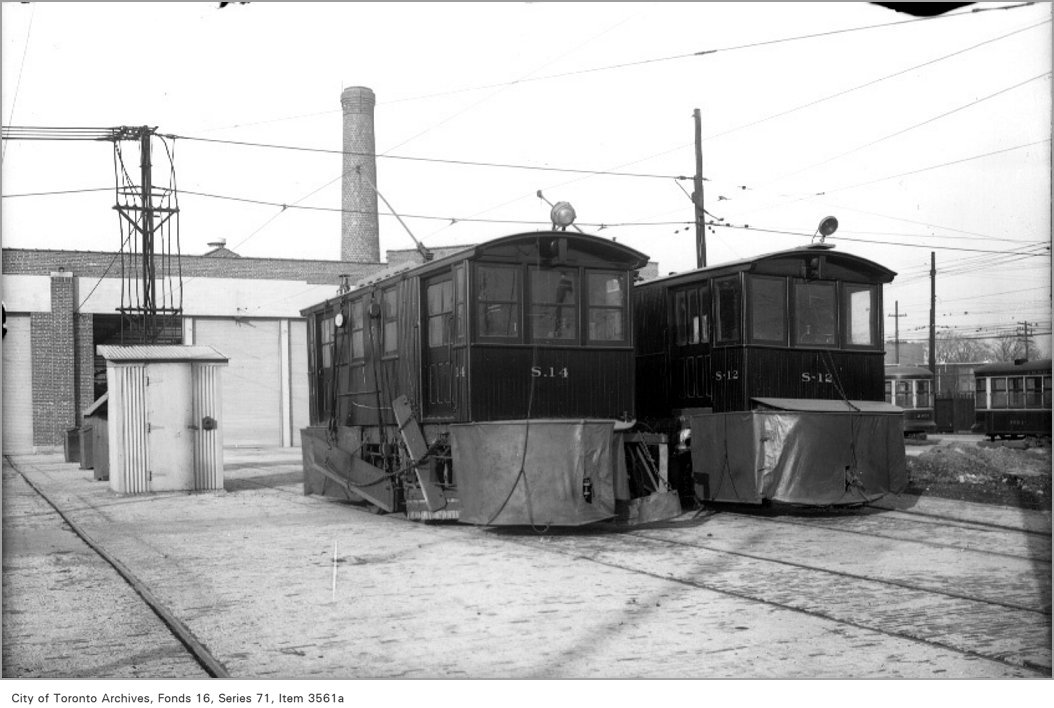
Ex-TRC snow sweepers

=== Streetcar sales ===
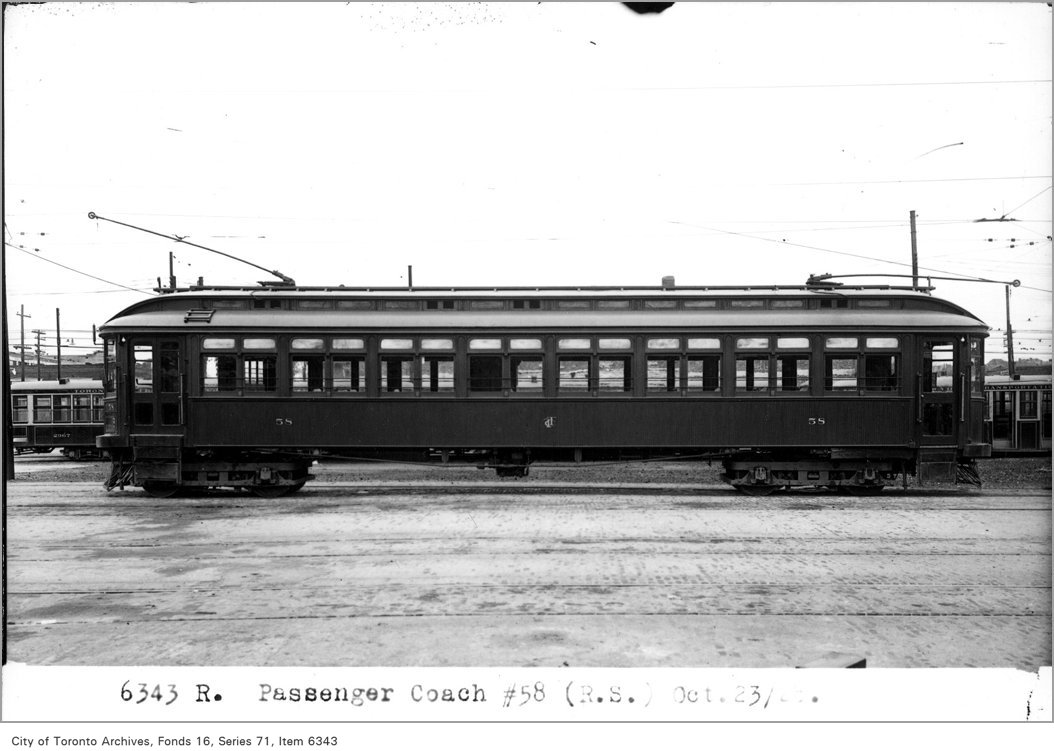
Radial car 58 built by TRC in 1906 for T&YRR

The TRC sold a small percentage of the streetcars it built to other operators. The TRC had a subsidiary company, the Convertible Car Company of Toronto, that built cars for systems in Mexico, South America, and Western Canada. Some sales were for used streetcars that had run in Toronto. Here is a partial list of sales:

- Several large radial (interurban) cars were built for the Toronto and York Radial Railway.
- Between 1897 and 1904, the TRC sold eight batches of double-ended, single-truck streetcars to the Winnipeg Electric Street Railway Company. The sales totalled 38 closed and 4 open cars.
- The TRC built six new single-ended, double-truck streetcars for the Monterrey Railway, Light & Power Co. in Mexico. These had only a centre door on each side of the car.
- In 1907 and 1908, the TRC sold 14 single-truck open cars to Monterrey. These cars were part of a group of 24 cars built in 1894 as doubled-ended cars before the TRC decided on single-ended operation. The Toronto Suburban Railway also bought one of these cars. These were used-car sales.

About that time, the Toronto and York Radial Railway, the Toronto Suburban Railway and the Winnipeg Electric Street Railway Company were all affiliated with the owners of the Toronto Railway Company. According to a source, the Monterrey Railway, Light & Power Co. was founded in Toronto.

=== Preservation ===
The following is a list of preserved TRC passenger and work cars. All except car 327 were built by the TRC, and all were used by the TTC.

Car no.	Car type	Year built	Year retired	Description
306	Single-ended, single-truck streetcar	1892	1921	Preserved at Canada Science and Technology Museum
327	Single-ended, single-truck open streetcar	1933	1967	Replica using truck and parts from the original 327 built in 1892, preserved at Halton County Radial Railway
1326	Single-ended, double-truck streetcar	1910	1951	Preserved at Halton County Radial Railway
1704	Single-ended, single-truck streetcar	1913	1924	Currently unrestored as rail grinder W-25, preserved at Halton County Radial Railway
1706	Single-ended, single-truck streetcar	1913	1924	Preserved at Shore Line Trolley Museum
C-1	Crane	1911	1968	Preserved at Halton County Radial Railway
W-4	Flat motor, TRC construction car 4	1904	1972	Preserved at Halton County Radial Railway

== Facilities ==
=== Carhouses ===
In all, the TRC had seven carhouses, although no more than six at any one time. They are listed here alphabetically by name:

Carhouses
Carhouse	Location	Opened	Notes
Dundas Carhouse	Dundas Street West and Howard Park Avenue	1897	The brick carhouse was expanded in 1901 towards Richee Avenue and again on the Howard Park side in 1904, with both extensions under iron sheds. In 1914, 144 streetcars and 20 single-truck trailers operated out of Dundas, serving the Dundas, College and Dovercourt routes. Under TTC ownership, Dundas ceased as a division in 1931 and was partly demolished; it was fully demolished after it ceased to be a trailer yard in 1938.
King Carhouse	King Street East and St. Lawrence Street, SE corner	1887	The TRC converted the Toronto Street Railway's King stables into a carhouse which underwent several expansions and modifications up to 1912. In 1904, the carhouse stored 388 of the TRC's 718 streetcars and trailers with space for up to 395 units. The carhouse had 2 storeys; the second floor stored trailers and had a transfer table to access tracks from an elevator. There was a storage yard under sheds on the south side of the carhouse. Tracks were oriented north–south in the carhouse and east–west in the storage yard. The carhouse suffered from fire twice, first in March 1912, destroying the sheds and 145 cars, and again on December 28, 1916, destroying the facility along with 163 passenger and seven work cars. Some storage tracks were relaid but were removed by 1920. As of 2020, a condo complex at 45 St. Lawrence Street occupies the site.
Lansdowne Carhouse	Patton & Lansdowne avenues, NW corner	1911	The carhouse had ten storage and two repair tracks accommodating 108 streetcars, plus 12 yard tracks for 132 cars. In 1914, the carhouse hosted 102 double-truck cars, 94 single-truck cars and 18 trailers serving the Belt Line, Bloor, Bathurst, Carlton and Harbord routes. The TTC acquired the facility in 1921, made it a joint trolley bus garage and carhouse in 1947 and ended streetcar storage there in 1967. The facility was abandoned after 1996 and demolished in 2003. Affordable housing and seniors' housing was being built on the old site as of 2025.
Roncesvalles Carhouse	Roncesvalles Avenue and Queen Street West, NW corner	1895	The TRC carhouse faced Roncesvalles Avenue and contained 15 interior tracks with capacity for 75 double-truck cars. In 1907, 12 exterior tracks were added on the north side of the carhouse with capacity for 135 double-truck cars. All tracks were stub tracks oriented east–west. The spacing between tracks was too narrow for larger, modern cars, and the repair facilities were obsolete. In 1923, the TTC demolished the TRC building and constructed a new carhouse building with tracks oriented north–south.
Russell Carhouse	Connaught Avenue and Queen Street East	1913	The TRC built the Russell facility as a paint shop with six tracks. The building had an east wing extending to Connaught Avenue, containing offices, a store room and a boiler room. After the King Carhouse burnt down at the end of 1916, Russell was converted into a full carhouse with the paint line using only one carhouse track. Due to cracked foundations, the TTC demolished and rebuilt the carhouse in 1924. The east wing was the only part of the 1913 building that was retained.
Scarboro Beach Carhouse	Queen Street East & Maclean Avenue, SW corner	1920	To partly replace storage tracks at the burnt-out King Carhouse, the TRC built the four-track frame building to handle routine maintenance. Its capacity was 20 single-truck or 16 double-truck streetcars. The TTC chose not to operate the facility. The TRC stored obsolete open cars and trailers there pending disposal. The property was put up for sale in 1928.
Yorkville Carhouse	Between Yorkville Avenue & Scollard Street next to Toronto Fire Station 312	1892	In 1892, the TRC demolished the TSR's Yorkville stables (1861) in order to build a nine-track carhouse holding 44 double-truck streetcars. In 1899, the TRC added a shed along Scollard Avenue to hold 31 double-truck streetcars. Later a 24-car outdoor storage yard was added. The narrow spaces between carhouse tracks became unsuitable for wider, more modern streetcars. In 1922, the TTC closed the carhouse; it was later demolished. Today, a condominium and Mist Garden occupy the site.

=== Shops and work yards ===
The TRC had several facilities near the intersection of Front and Frederick streets. Many of these facilities were inherited from the Toronto Street Railway (TSR), and the TRC repurposed them for the electric streetcar system. In 1924, the TTC moved some functions from the facilities in this area to the then-new Hillcrest Complex. The following is a list of facilities in the Front and Frederick area:

Shops and work yards
Facility	Location	Opened	Notes
Car shops	Front & Frederick streets, NW corner	1882	The TRC inherited the three-storey car shop building from the Toronto Street Railway, and upgraded it to handle heavier electric streetcars. The upgrades included a new hoist to move cars between street level and the upper floors. All but ten of the TRC's streetcars were built here. A streetcar track branched into the building from Front Street. In 1924, the building's functions were moved to the Hillcrest Complex, and the building was rented out.
Motor shops	between Frederick and Sherbourne streets, north side of The Esplanade	1893	Five tracks passed through the motor shops allowing streetcars to enter southbound from Frederick Street and exit northbound on Sherbourne Street. In 1924, the TTC moved the shops to the Hillcrest Complex. Between 1927 and 1930 the building was used as a freight depot for freight motors from the TTC's Lake Simcoe radial line. The TTC later used the building as a bus garage.
Powerhouse	Front & Frederick streets, SE corner	1888	After 1891, the TRC converted the TSR's Frederick Street stable building into a power plant after reinforcing the structure and installing generators. With power from Niagara in 1907, the plant was put into reserve status; in 1924, the TTC shut it down. Since 1977, the Young People's Theatre has occupied the building.
Stores building	Front Street south side, east side of powerhouse	1883	The TRC repurposed the former TSR Front Street carhouse primarily as a stores building but also for storing and deploying streetcar trailers. A streetcar track branched into the building from Front Street. The TTC vacated the building after its functions were moved to the Hillcrest Complex in 1924.
George Street yard	Front Street East & George Street, SW corner	circa 1903	The yard was on the site of the TSR's George Street stable (built 1881) which burnt down in 1902. The yard was used to store coal for the powerhouse until 1904, and then as a storage area for the Way Department. Into the TTC era, it was also used to store and scrap obsolete streetcars. A streetcar track branched in to the yard from the corner of Front and George.
Front Street yard	Sherbourne Street & Front Street East, NW corner	?	The yard had ten stub tracks all facing Sherbourne Street, and could hold 35 streetcars. Most of the yard was sold in 1925, leaving a strip of land for a TTC loop serving the Sherbourne streetcar route.

Today, only the powerhouse building still stands, now occupied by a theatre. Condominiums occupy most of the former facility sites.

=== Revenue-generating facilities ===
Away from downtown, the TRC had a revenue-generating facility:

Revenue-generating facilities
Facility	Location	Opened	Notes
Scarboro Beach Park	Queen Street East and Maclean Avenue	1912	Scarboro Beach Park was an amusement park owned by the TRC, which provided a destination for many streetcar riders. Besides games and rides, the park had a grandstand, a picnic area and a sports field. It closed in 1925.

== See also ==
- Toronto streetcar system
- Toronto streetcar system rolling stock including ex-TRC vehicles
- List of Ontario railways
- List of defunct Canadian railways

Preceded by Toronto Street Railway	Public transit in Toronto; 1891–1921	Succeeded by Toronto Civic Railways (1915–1921); Toronto Transportation Commission
