= History of the Toronto Transit Commission =

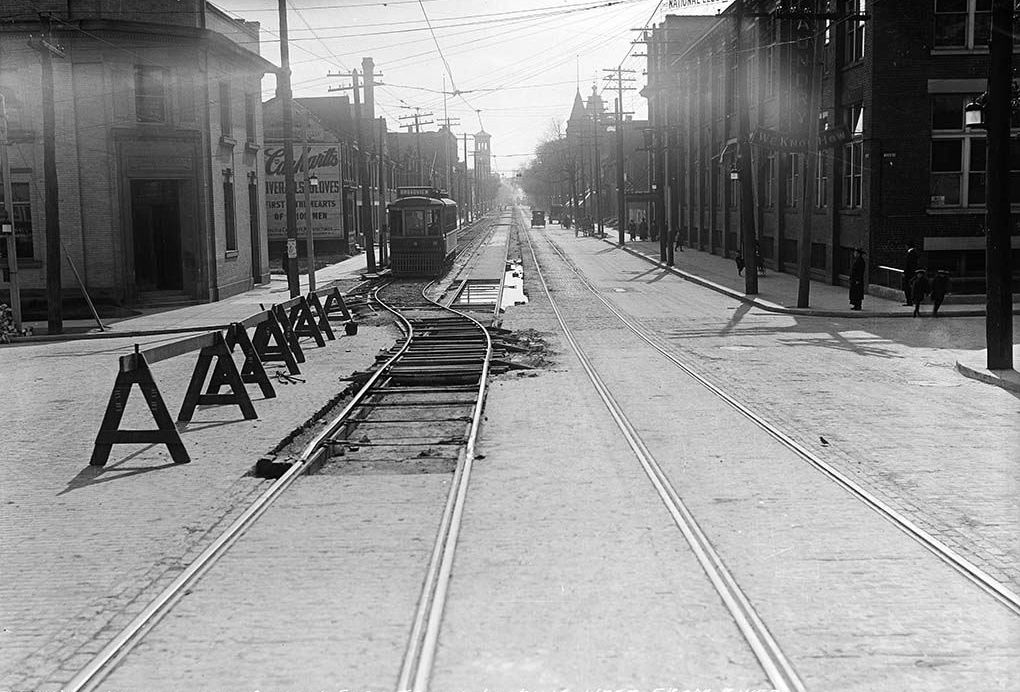
Looking down Queen Street East westward from River Street in 1917

The history of public transportation in Toronto in Canada dates back to the middle of the 19th century under many different private companies, organizations and owners, which were all later unified as a single municipal government-run entity during the 1920s.

== Predecessors of the TTC ==
=== Past transit operators ===
Transit operators previous to creation of Toronto Transit Commission
MSR (Note: Metropolitan Street Railway)
TSER (Note: Toronto and Scarboro' Electric Railway, Light and Power Company)
TMER (Note: Toronto and Mimico Electric Railway and Light Company)
(Note: Schomberg and Aurora Railway)
Toronto & York Radial Railway
Toronto Ferry Company
TCR (Note: Toronto Civic Railways)
Toronto Transportation Commission
Toronto Transit Commission
Williams Omnibus Line
Toronto Street Railway
Toronto Railway Company
NYR (Note: North Yonge Railways)
York Township Railways
Toronto Suburban Railway
Danforth Bus Lines
Gray Coach
DRCL (Note: Del-Ray Coach Lines)
Hollinger Bus Lines
Roseland Bus Lines
WYDBS (Note: West York and District Bus Service)
WYCL (Note: West York Coach Lines)
│
1840
│
1880
│
1920
│
1960
│
2000

= private omnibus
= private animal railway
= private electric railway
= private bus line
= private ferry
= public electric railway
= public bus line
= public transit body (all modes)

=== Privately operated ===
Toronto's first public transportation company was the Williams Omnibus Bus Line, owned by furniture-maker and undertaker H. B. Williams. The line began operation in 1849. It carried passengers in horse-drawn stagecoaches via King and Yonge Streets, between the St. Lawrence Market and the Village of Yorkville. The price of each trip was six pence.

In 1861, a 30-year franchise for a "street railway" was given to Alexander Easton. The company operated under the name Toronto Street Railway (TSR). In 1891, the TSR franchise was not renewed. After a few months of municipal operation, a 30-year franchise was granted to William Mackenzie's Toronto Railway Company (TRC). The TRC was required to replace horse-drawn streetcars with electric ones by 1894. From their introduction, streetcars were only allowed to operate six days a week, as a blue law prohibited Sunday service. This was upheld in an 1892 referendum, but a second referendum in 1897 overturned the law by a narrow margin, and the first Sunday streetcars ran on May 16 of that year.

In 1885, north of the city, a franchise was granted to the Metropolitan Street Railway (MSR). Outside of the city, transit connections to the suburbs were provided by interurban lines, known in Ontario as "radial railways" because their lines radiated from the city. These included the Toronto and York Radial Railway and the Toronto Suburban Railway.

=== Publicly operated ===
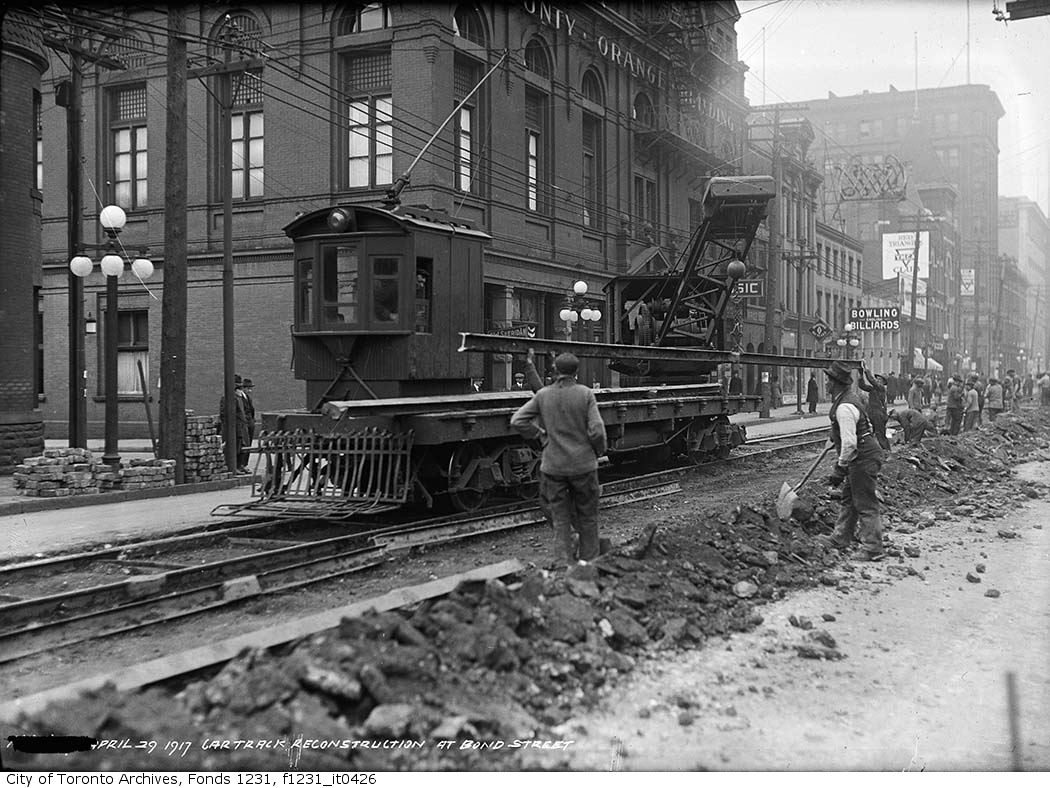
Streetcar track work in 1917 at Queen and Bond streets

Prior to the establishment of the TTC, the City of Toronto operated the city-owned system under the Toronto Civic Railways (TCR) name, which was created to serve areas to which the Toronto Railways Company did not.

In 1920, a Provincial Act created the Toronto Transportation Commission (TTC) and, with the expiration of the TRC's franchise in 1921, the Commission took over and amalgamated nine existing fare systems within the city limits. Between 1921 and 1953, the TTC added 35 new routes in the city and extended 20 more. It also operated 23 suburban routes on a service-for-cost basis. It abandoned the unprofitable North Yonge Railways radial railway line.

The Great Depression and World War II both placed heavy financial burdens on municipalities. During most of the 1930s, municipal governments had to cope with general welfare costs and assistance to the unemployed. The TTC realized that improvements had to be made despite the depression and in 1936 purchased the first of the newly developed PCC streetcars. The war put an end to the depression and increased migration from rural to urban areas. After the war, municipalities faced the problem of extending services to accommodate the increased population. Ironically, the one municipal service that prospered during the war years was public transit; employers had to stagger work hours to avoid overcrowding the streetcars. Toronto continued their program of purchasing PCC cars, running the world's largest fleet, including many obtained second-hand from U.S. cities that abandoned streetcar service.

== Toronto Transit Commission ==
=== Creation ===
Public transit was one of the essential services identified by Metropolitan Toronto's founders in 1953. On January 1, 1954, the Toronto Transportation Commission was renamed the Toronto Transit Commission and public transit was placed under the jurisdiction of the new Municipality of Metropolitan Toronto (Metro Toronto). The assets and liabilities of the original TTC and four independent bus lines operating in the suburbs were acquired by the Commission. In 1954, the TTC became the sole provider of public transportation services in Metro Toronto.

=== Subway boom: 1954–1980 ===
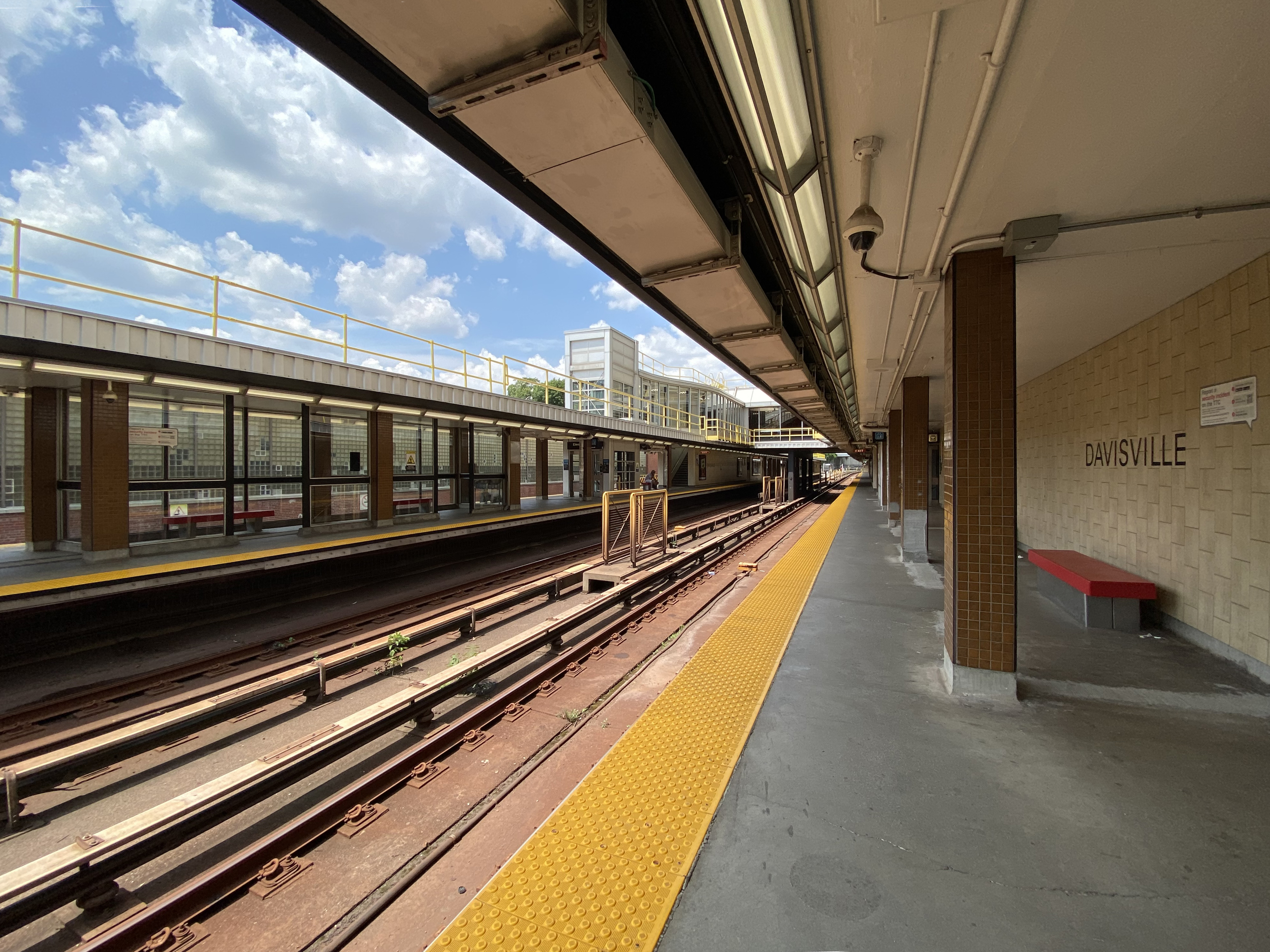
Davisville station on Line 1 Yonge–University; the station opened in 1954.

Canada's first subway system, the Union station-to-Eglinton section of the Yonge Street subway, was conceived and built with revenues gained during World War II. Gasoline rationing limited the use of automobiles, resulting in increased usage of public transit. After five years of construction work, the subway line opened to the public on March 30, 1954. Its underground portions were built entirely using cut-and-cover construction, with reinforced boards and temporary streetcar tracks laid over the trenches to allow Yonge Street to remain open as the tunnels were built. The original Yonge Street subway line went north from the railways' Union Station on Front Street to a suburban terminus at Eglinton Avenue. Important dignitaries, including Premier Leslie Frost and Toronto mayor Allan A. Lamport, rode the first train, going north from the yards at Davisville station, and then south from Eglinton along the entire line. At 2:30 p.m. that day, the last streetcar to travel Yonge Street south of Eglinton made its final ride. The subway reduced the trip from Union to Eglinton from about half an hour by streetcar (in good traffic) to less than fifteen minutes.

It was the first subway line to replace surface routes completely. It was also later the site of as experiment with aluminum subway cars, which led to their adoption throughout the system, and by other transit systems. Several expansions since 1954 have more than quintupled the area served, adding two new connected lines and a shorter intermediate capacity transit system (that would later be removed in 2023), as well as two new light rail lines.

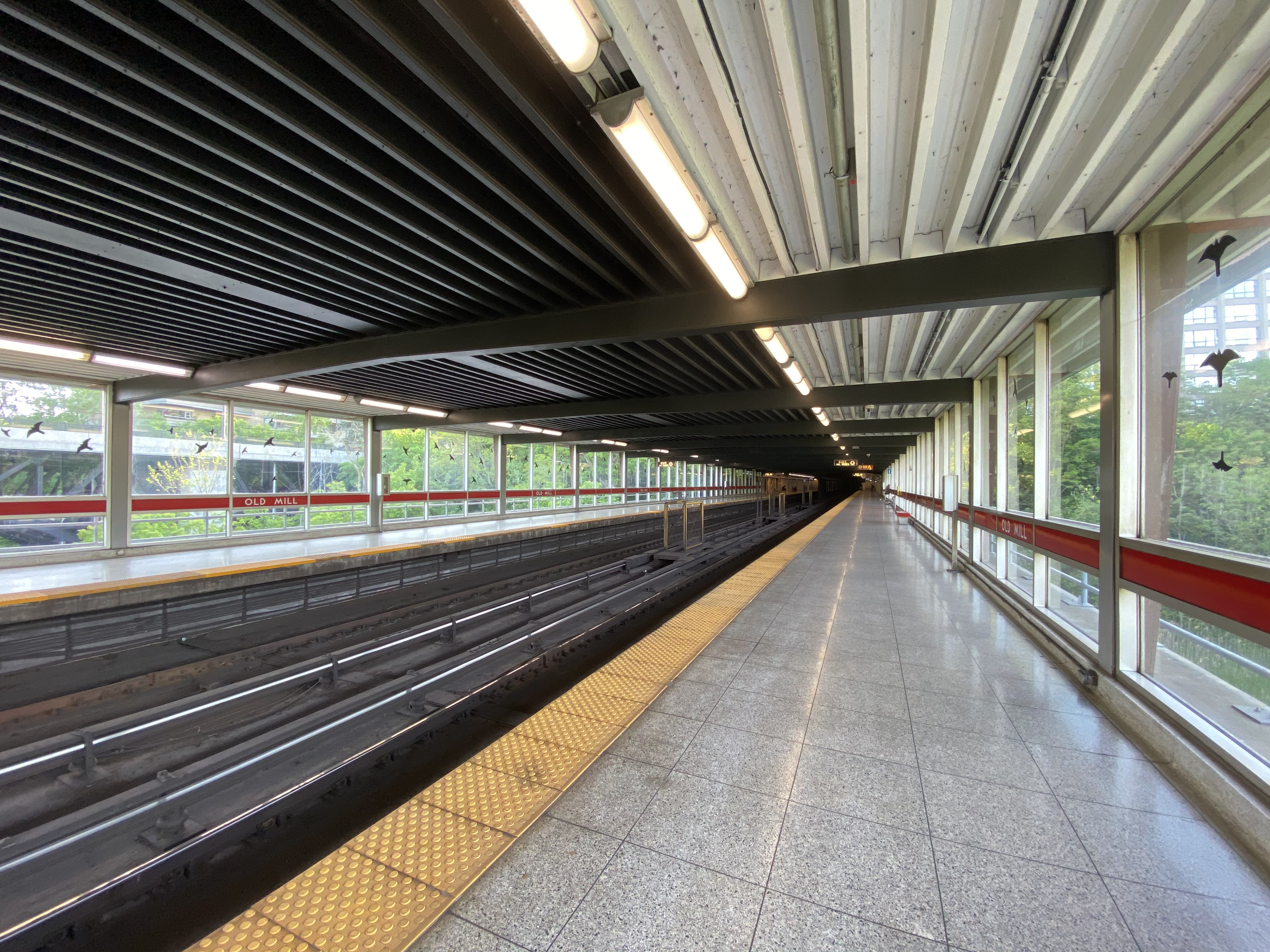
Old Mill station on Line 2 Bloor–Danforth; the station opened in 1968.

The University line opened nine years later, continuing from Union, back north under University Avenue, to St. George station. It was intentionally designed to serve much the same area as the Yonge line to increase capacity in anticipation of the planned east–west line. Three years after the University line opened, the original Bloor–Danforth line was built, going under about Bloor Street and Danforth Avenue. from Keele in the west, to Woodbine in the east. Within two years, the Bloor–Danforth line had been extended in both directions, to Islington in the west and Warden in the east. The original subway line was given the retronym Yonge–University line.

Plans were made for a streetcar subway along Queen Street, which were upgraded to a full subway in 1964, from the Humber loop to Greenwood, curving north to connect to the Bloor–Danforth subway. All that ever materialized of this line was an incomplete east-west station structure under Queen station at Yonge, which remains in existence today. The Queen Subway plan was cancelled in 1974 in favour of new lines in the suburbs.

In the 1970s, Toronto adopted a streetcar abandonment policy. The plan was to have low-volume services be served by buses, and more heavily used routes by subway lines. Later in that decade, the rising cost of subway construction and the awareness of the limitations of buses reversed that decision; Toronto is now one of the few North American cities to retain its streetcars through the 20th century, and Toronto is now slowly expanding the service.

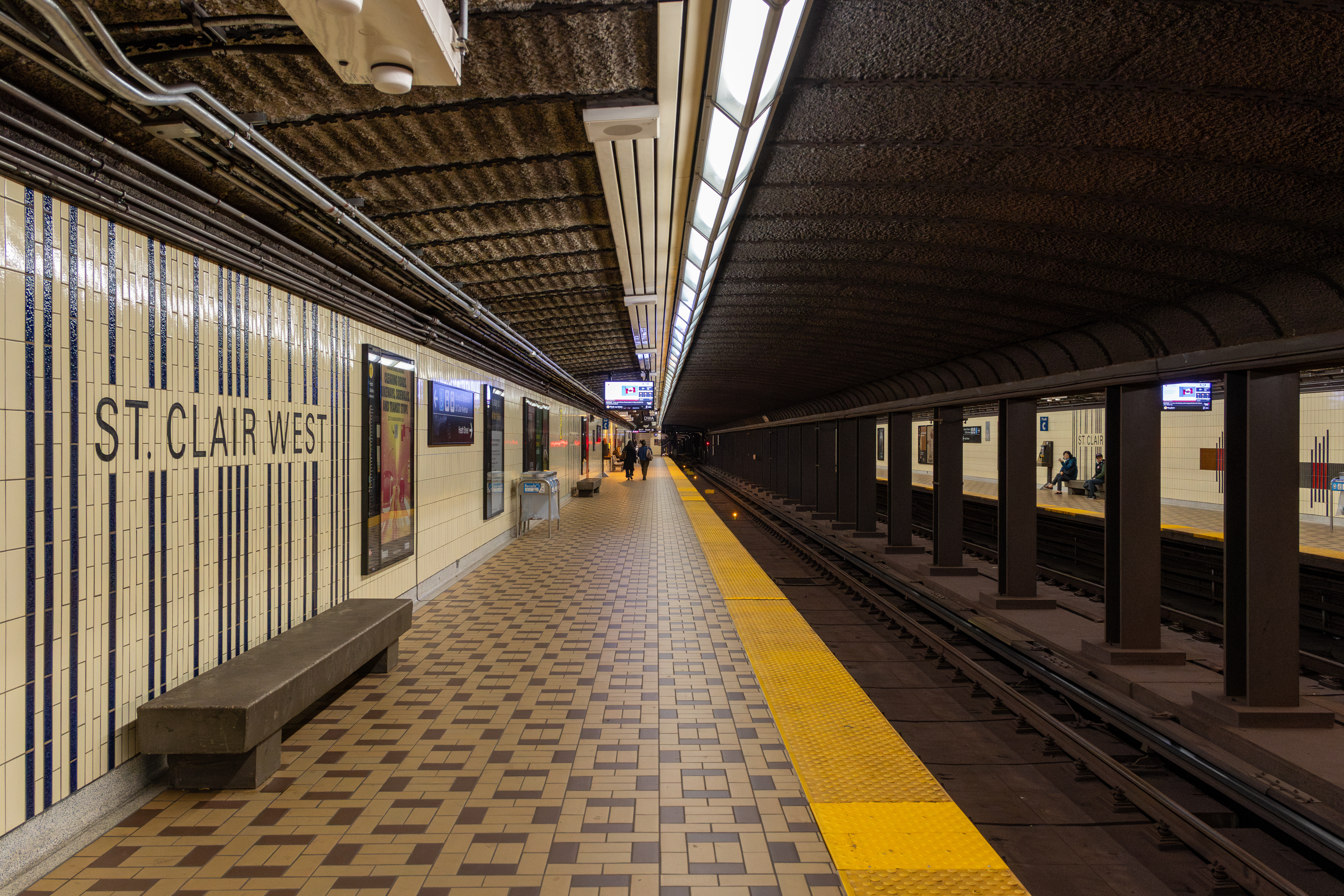
St. Clair West station on Line 1 Yonge–University; the station opened in 1978.

Changes to the composition of the Metro Toronto council moved the balance of power towards the suburban areas, and soon afterwards in 1973, the Yonge subway line was extended north to York Mills Road, and the next year it was extended farther north to Finch Avenue. Five years later, the Spadina line opened, going from the St. George station north to Wilson station. In 1980, the Bloor–Danforth line was extended once again, to the current termini of Kipling station on the west end, and Kennedy station on the east.

=== Lean years: 1980–1998 ===
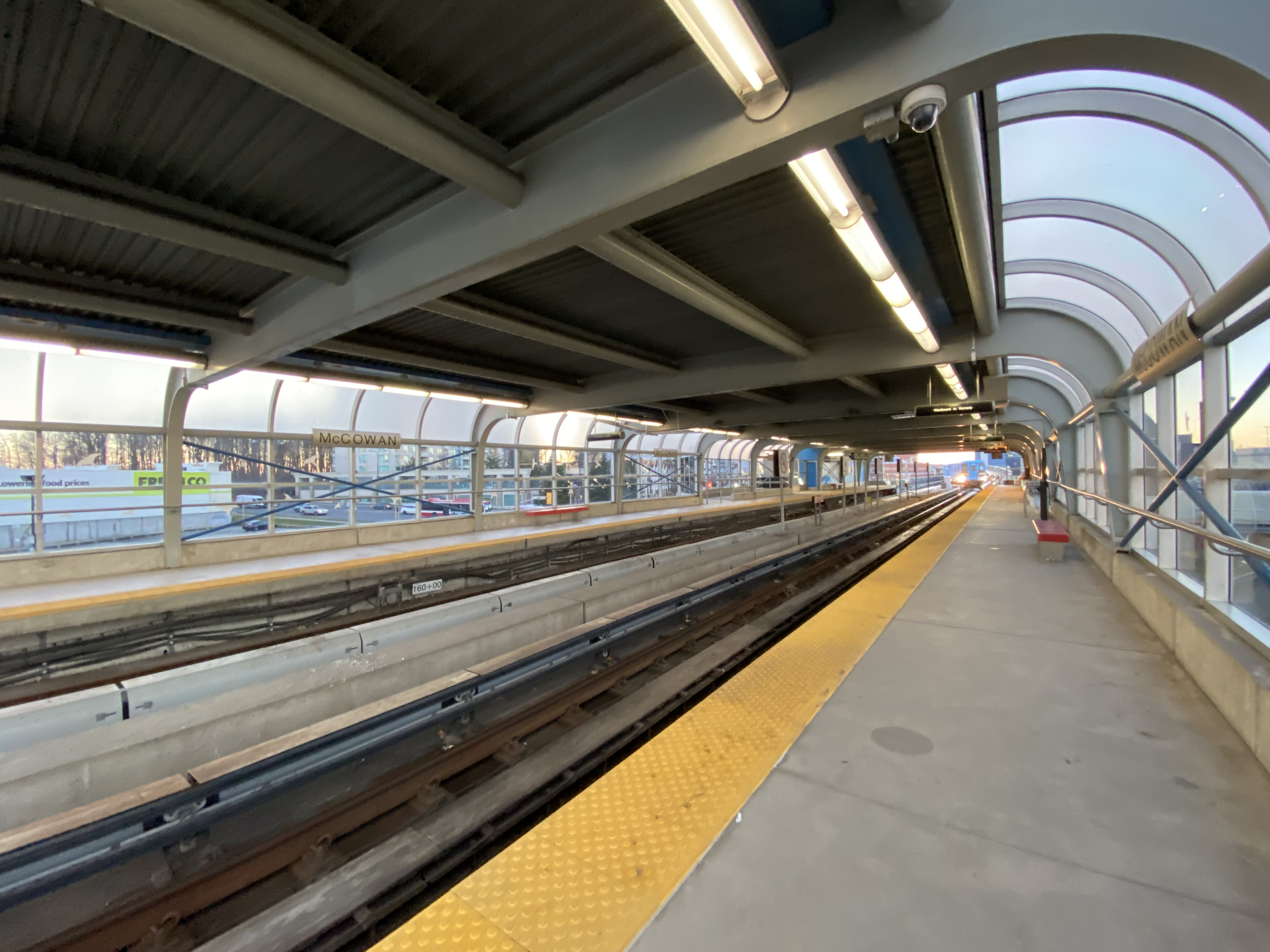
McCowan station on Line 3 Scarborough; it was in operation from 1985 to 2023.

After the 1980 extension of the Bloor–Danforth line, subway building came to a standstill. For the next 16 years, there would be no additional subway extensions, and for six years after that, any new subways. Instead, a proposed extension on the Danforth end of the Bloor–Danforth line was built in 1985 as the L-shaped Scarborough RT line, which went from Kennedy to McCowan station. The line was originally envisioned as a light rail line, using streetcars in a dedicated right of way, but was ultimately built as a mini-subway. Two years later, a new station was added south of Finch on the Yonge line, at the North York City Centre.

In 1985, the TTC released the Network 2011 expansion plan calling for expanding the subway system to nearly doubling its then-current size, including new lines on Sheppard, Eglinton, and a Downtown Relief Line. Only a small portion of the plan was ever built. The Progressive Conservative provincial government of Mike Harris halted work on the Eglinton line in 1995, and the partially dug tunnels were filled in. A similar line was later built as Line 5 Eglinton, with Progressive Conservative premier Doug Ford announcing a plan in April 2019 to extend the line west to Pearson Airport with a section of the line built underground from Royal York to Martin Grove and elevated from Jane to Scarlett. This expansion was expected to cost $4.7 billion and generate an estimated 37,000 daily boardings. The only subway expansion in this period was on the Spadina line, which added one new station, Downsview (later Sheppard West), in 1996.

=== Since 1998 ===
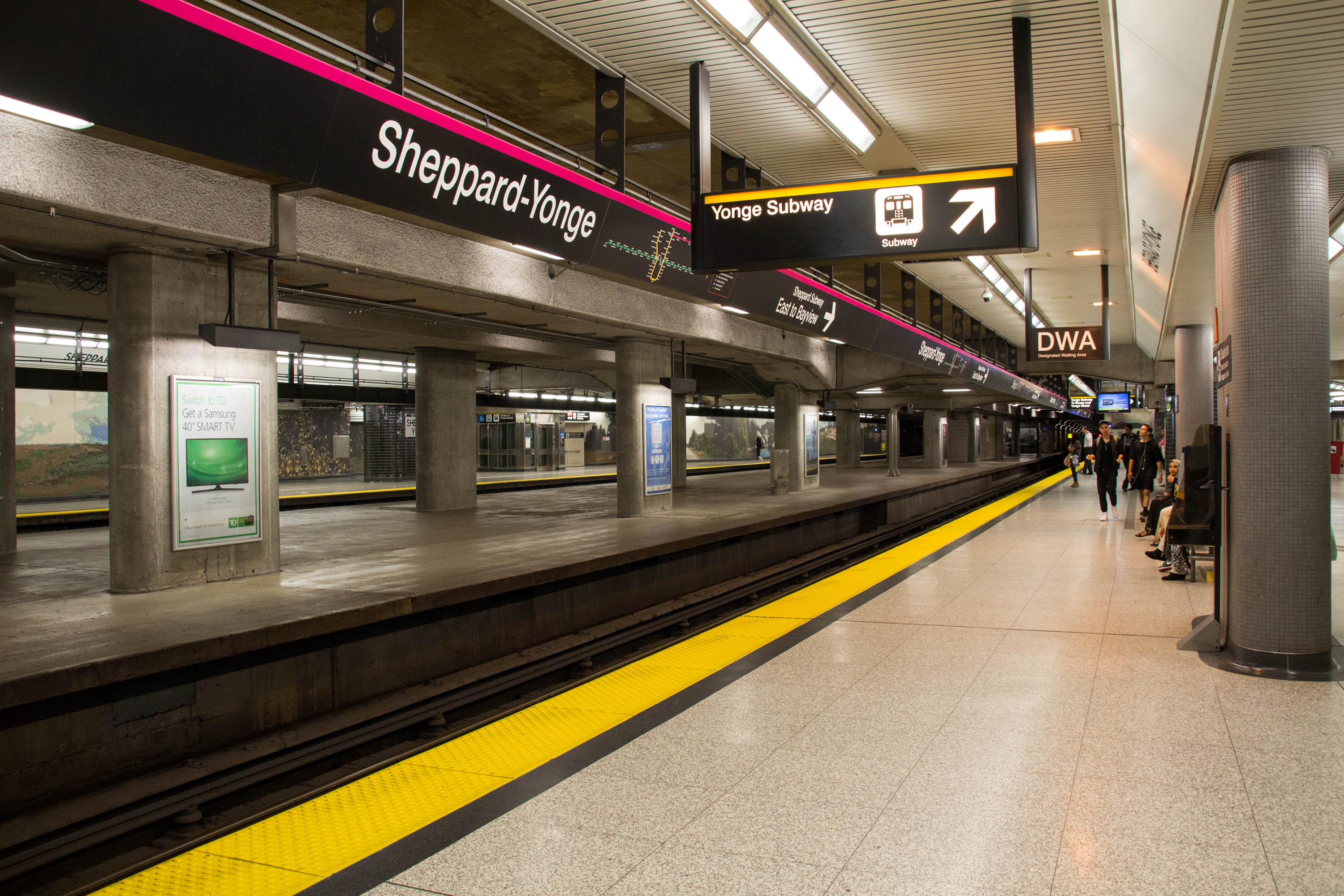
Sheppard–Yonge station on Line 4 Sheppard; the Line 4 platform opened in 2002, while the Line 1 platform opened in 1974.

In 1998, the Municipality of Metropolitan Toronto ceased to exist, replaced by the new City of Toronto, formed from the amalgamation of its six former municipalities. Four years later, the Sheppard line was opened, the first new subway line in decades. However, it was much shorter than originally planned, going from Yonge Street east only as far as Don Mills Road, instead of connecting with the Scarborough RT at Scarborough Centre. Extension of the Sheppard line remains one of the TTC's priorities for further extensions, should the funding and demand become available. The TTC is running four-car trains on the abbreviated Sheppard Line, two-thirds the length of those on the other Toronto heavy-rail subway lines, but the stations were built to accommodate full-length trains should sufficient ridership develop.

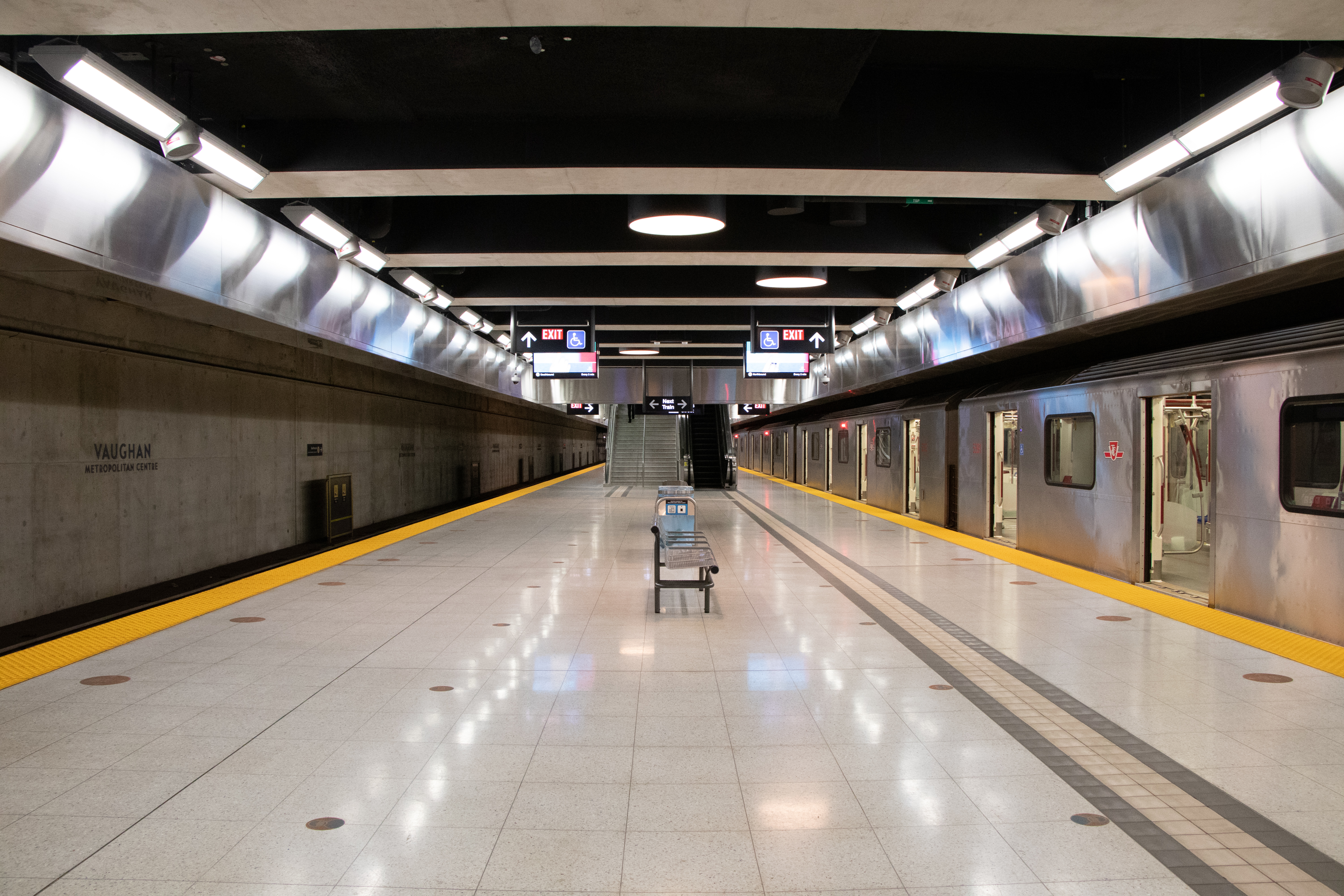
Vaughan Metropolitan Centre station on Line 1 Yonge–University; the station opened in 2017.

In January 2005, the cash-strapped TTC introduced a plan to curtail costly subway expansion and look at expanding the rapid transit network less expensively. This could involve implementing busways or expanding the streetcar system with more modern vehicles and less running in mixed traffic. While the TTC does not have funding to break ground on new projects, it was completing the planning stages, including an environmental assessment, for an extension of the Spadina line north to York University and Vaughan Metropolitan Centre. This project was completed in December 2017.

On May 29, 2006, a wildcat strike took place, after TTC employees walked off the job suddenly, primarily caused by safety concerns and late shifts. The strike was immediately deemed illegal by the Ontario Labour Relations Board, and they were immediately ordered back to work. The short interruption in service caused severe disruption in the city, on what was a very hot day. The strike, however, was not without consequence to TTC management, as the general manager, Rick Ducharme, officially tendered his resignation just one week later.

A transit strike was averted for April 21, 2008, after a tentative contract was reached the day before. The contract specified a three-percent increase in salary over three years to workers. On April 25, 2008, the TTC union voted down this contract. Sixty-five percent of workers voted no to the settlement, and as of midnight on April 26, 2008, the Toronto Transit Commission was officially on strike. The TTC workers were legislated back to work on April 27, 2008, by the passing of Bill 66 by the Ontario Provincial Parliament.

In 2023, Line 3 Scarborough permanently closed after a derailment. It had exceeded its lifespan by roughly a decade. It was replaced with a busway from Kennedy to Ellesmere in September 2026.

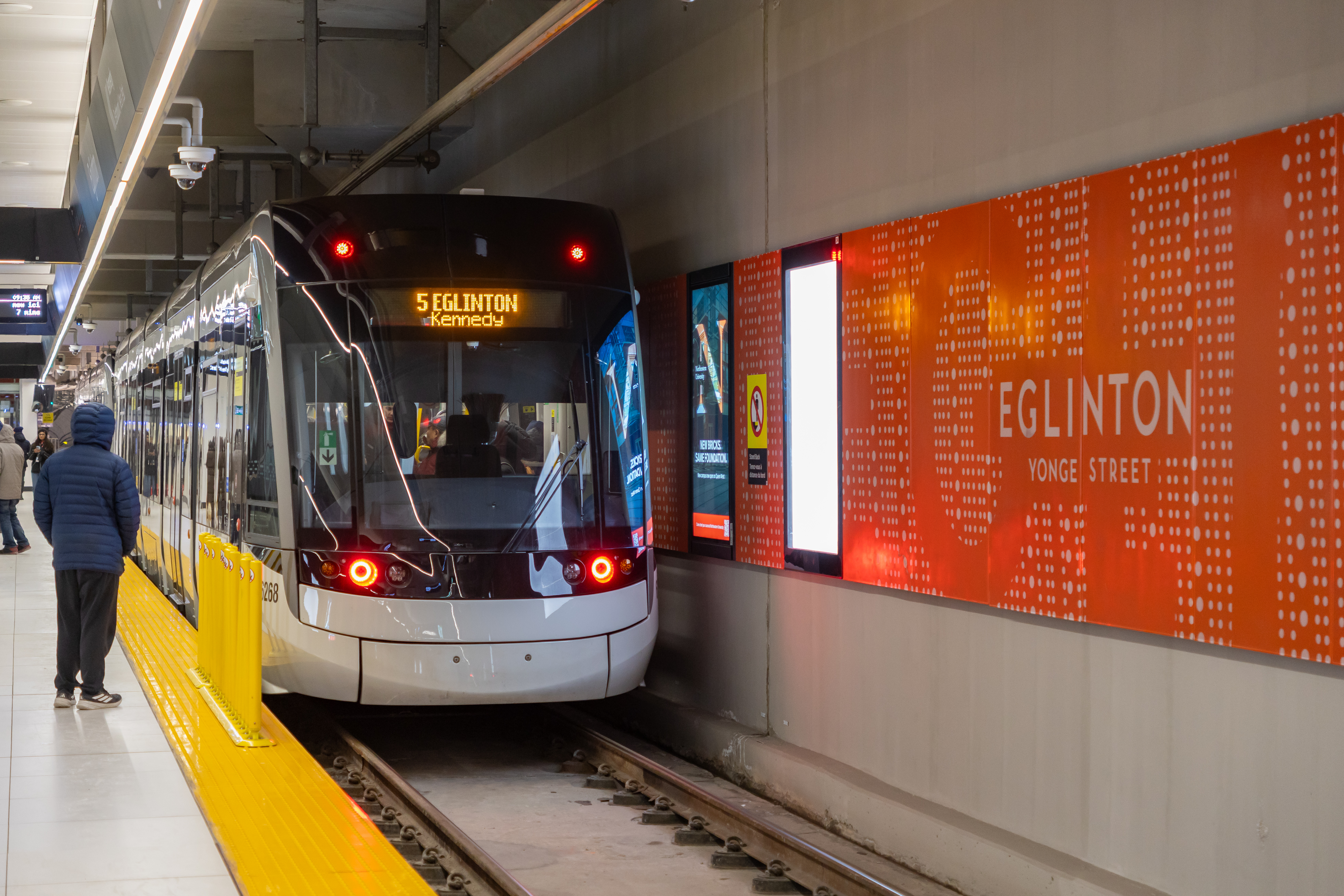
Eglinton station on Line 5 Eglinton; the Line 5 platform opened in 2026, while the Line 1 platform opened in 1954.

In December 2025, Line 6 Finch West opened, becoming the first new transit line in Toronto since 2002. In February 2026, Line 5 Eglinton opened.

As of October 2026, the TTC is constructing new lines and extensions, including the Ontario Line and the Eglinton Crosstown west extension.

The TTC continues to be the sole provider of public transit within the City of Toronto, as well as operating contracted services into the neighbouring York Region. Regional commuter service (both bus and rail) is operated by GO Transit, the vast majority of which goes to downtown Toronto's Union Station. Connecting bus routes of the Mississauga, Brampton, York Region, and Durham Region transit systems enter Toronto at various points.

== TTC chairs and chief general managers ==
From 1989, the chair of the TTC was a member of Metro Toronto Council. After amalgamation in 1997, the chair is a member of Toronto Council.

General managers of the TTC
(Chief general managers from 1975)

←	W.H. Paterson*

←	J. T. Harvey*

Toronto Transportation Commission
Metropolitan Toronto
City of Toronto
Subway construction

* denotes general managers for subway construction
** denotes general managers for operations

Chairs of the TTC
Name	Term
P. W. Ellis	1920–1929
Frederick Langdon Hubbard	1929–1930
William C. McBrien	1931–1932
S.J. McMaster	1932–1933
William C. McBrien	1933–1954
William G. Russell	1954–1955
Allan A. Lamport	1955–1959
Charles A. Walton	1959–1960
C. C. Downey	1960–1963
Ralph Day	1963–1972
Franklin I. Young	1972–1973
Karl L. Mallette	1973–1975
G. Gordon Hurlburt	1975–1979
Julian Porter	1979–1987
Jeff Lyons	1987–1989
Lois Griffin	1989–1992
Michael (Mike) Colle	1992–1994
Paul Christie	1994–1998
Howard Moscoe	1998–2000
Brian Ashton	2000–2002
Betty Disero	2002–2003
Howard Moscoe	2003–2006
Adam Giambrone	2006–2010
Karen Stintz	2010–2014
Maria Augimeri	2014
Josh Colle	2014–2018
Jaye Robinson	2019–2022
Jon Burnside	2022–2023
Jamaal Myers	2023–present

A list of CGMs and CEOs of the TTC:

- Herbert Henry Couzens, general manager (GM) 1921–1924
- David William Harvey, GM 1924–1938
- Henry C. Patten, GM 1938–1952
- W. E. P. Duncan, GM 1952–1959
- John G. Inglis, general manager – operations (GMO) 1959–1968
- James H. Kearns, GMO 1968–1975
- R. Michael Warren, chief general manager (CGM) 1975–1981
- Alf Savage, CGM 1981–1987
- Al Leach, CGM 1987–1995
- David L. Gunn, CGM 1995–1999
- Rick Ducharme, CGM 1999–2006
- Gary Webster, CGM 2006–2012
- Andy Byford, acting CGM and chief executive officer (CEO) 2012–2017
- Rick Leary, interim CEO (2017); CEO 2018–present
