= Hillcrest Complex =

Maintenance facility of the Toronto Transit Commission

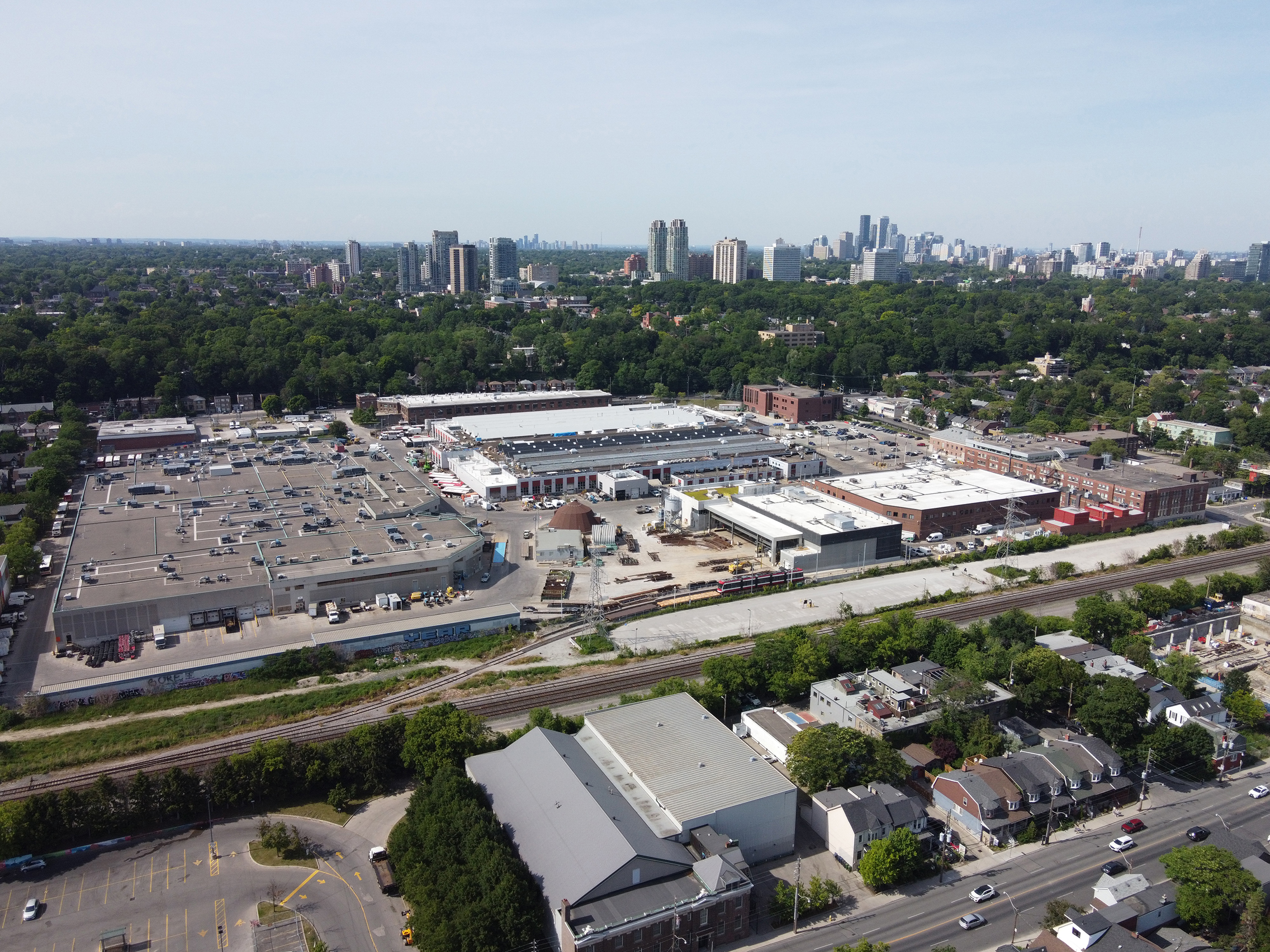
- Aerial view of Hillcrest Complex

General information
- Location: 1138 Bathurst Street; Toronto, Ontario; Canada
- Coordinates: 43°40′32″N 79°25′04″W
- Operator: Toronto Transit Commission

Construction
- Structure type: Maintenance shops; administration offices; Transit Control Centre

History
- Opened: 1924
Location

Hillcrest Complex, the Toronto Transit Commission's largest facility, is responsible for most of the maintenance work on the system's surface vehicles, including heavy overhauls, repairs, and repainting. It is located adjacent to the intersection of Bathurst Street and Davenport Road. The site is also home to the TTC's Transit Control Centre, but the operational headquarters of the organization remains at the McBrien Building, at 1900 Yonge Street.

Hillcrest Complex occupies an area of about 13 hectares (32 acres) with a frontage of 270 m (890 ft) along Bathurst Street and 420 m (1,380 ft) along Davenport Road.

== History ==
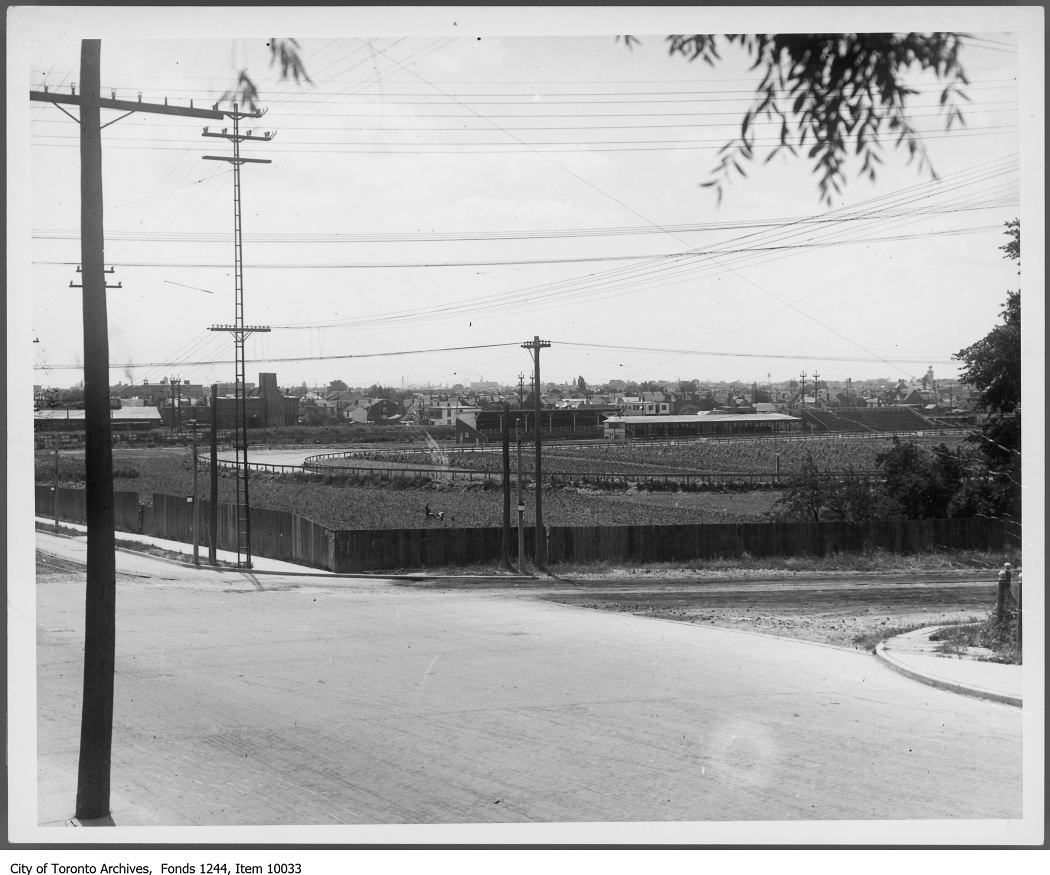
View of Hillcrest Park on south-east corner of Bathurst and Davenport, Toronto

In 1922, the TTC purchased the Hillcrest Race Track to use its land for the new shop complex to replace smaller facilities inherited from the Toronto Railway Company. The TTC opened Hillcrest Complex on March 13, 1924, replacing the TRC's carshops, motor shops and stores building located at or near at Front and Frederick Streets. On June 9, the School of Instruction moved into Hillcrest.

During World War II, the Hillcrest Complex participated in the war effort by producing parts for military equipment.

On July 30, 1953, Toronto's first two subway cars arrived at the Hillcrest Complex. However, all subsequent deliveries of G-series subway cars were made directly to the Davisville Yard.

In the 1980s, the TTC purchased land on the west side of the complex to construct the W.E.P. Duncan Building and H.C. Patten Building.

In 2008 and 2020, track replacement on Bathurst Street temporarily severed the St. Clair streetcar line from the rest of the streetcar system. During those construction periods, Hillcrest was used to store streetcars for route 512 St. Clair.

=== Railway access ===
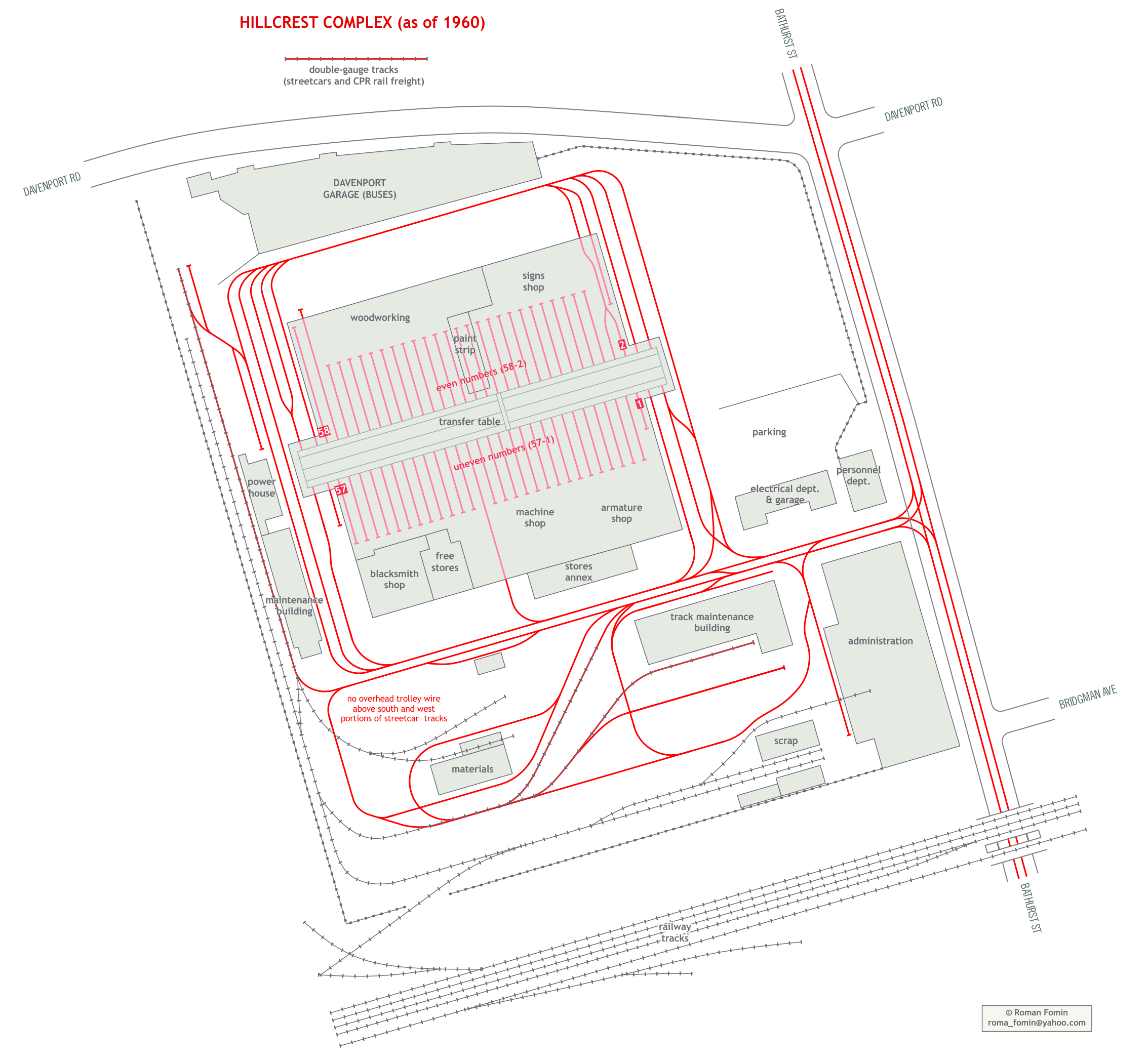
Hillcrest plans (as of 1960)

Canadian Pacific Railway's mid-town rail line lies on the south side of the Hillcrest Complex, and the complex once had a network of standard gauge tracks and sidings for receiving railway cars. On the south and west sides of the complex, standard gauge tracks were intermixed with broader TTC gauge tracks creating four-rail dual gauge where the standard and TTC gauge tracks overlapped. (See map.)

After its opening in 1924, the Hillcrest Complex received railway shipments of coal, gravel and sand for use throughout the system. Earlier, the TTC had used the Hanson Yard (inherited from the Toronto Civic Railways) for such receipts.

From 1940 to the 1970s, the TTC maintained standard-gauge switcher Y-18 to shunt railway cars around the complex. The TTC converted Y-18 from former dump car W-15 which the TTC had built in 1922; Y-18 was essentially a motorized flat car on two bogies with a cab at one end. Since there was no electrical overhead wires over the standard and dual-gauge tracks, Y-18 had no overhead electrical pickup device; it took power from an electrical extension cord.

Some time after the retirement of Y-18, standard gauge track disappeared from the Hillcrest Complex. However, in 2014, a railway siding was constructed on the south side of the complex to receive deliveries of new Flexity Outlook streetcars, as the 30-metre length of the new cars made transport by road from the factory impractical. At the east end of the siding, there is a ramp with TTC gauge tracks where another streetcar can pull a newly delivered Flexity streetcar from the flat car and shunt to the Harvey Shops for inspection. On January 24, 2020, the delivery of the last of 204 Flexity Outlook streetcars took place here, with streetcar 4603 arriving by rail from Bombardier's Thunder Bay plant.

== Buildings ==
=== D.W. Harvey Shops ===
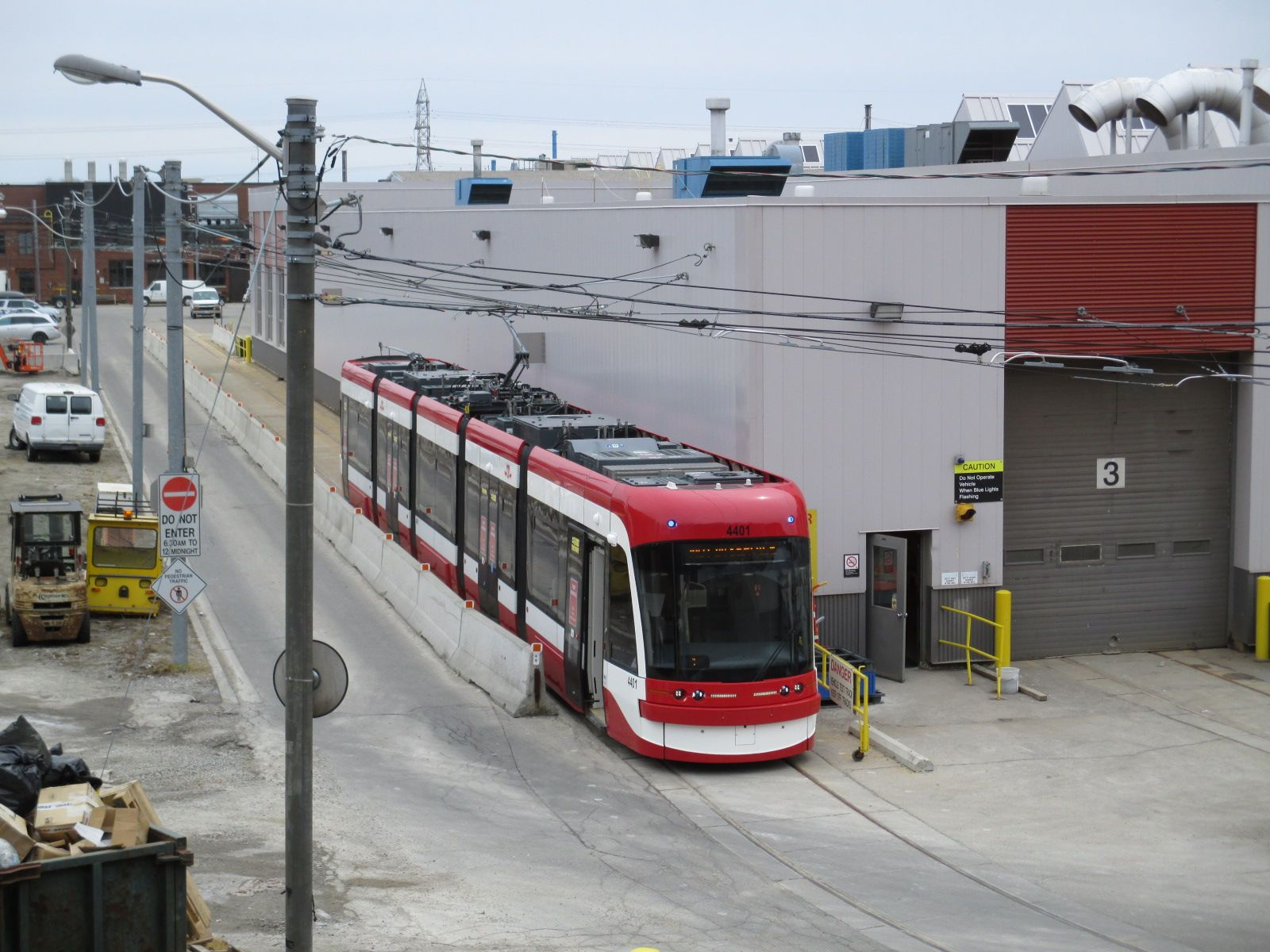
Flexity Outlook 4401 streetcar beside the Harvey Shops

Named for D. W. Harvey and opened in 1923, the Harvey Shops handle the heavy maintenance of buses as well as high-floor streetcars such as the CLRV and ALRV. The shops occupy a space of 250,000 square feet (23,000 m^{2}) and is divided into sections for trades such as upholstery, blacksmith and carpentry. There is also a paint shop.

The building contains a transfer table to access over 50 service bays with about 25 bays on each side of the moving table. The transfer table and most of the bays are only 15 metres (49 ft) long. So, when ALRV streetcars with a length of 23 metres (75 ft) were introduced, an addition was built on the easternmost tracks with direct access from outdoors to allow the ALRV cars to drive through the old building crossing the transfer table into a longer wing on the northeast side of the building where they are maintained.

The new Flexity streetcars cannot be maintained at the Harvey Shops because of their length of 30 metres (98 ft) and because the shops are oriented to service the equipment under the high floors of older streetcars rather than the roof-top equipment of the low-floor streetcars. Thus, the Leslie Barns will be handling heavy maintenance for the Flexity cars.

The Harvey Shops does truck and motor overhauls for streetcar and subway equipment, and it will supplement the Leslie Barns in doing such overhauls for Flexity Outlook streetcars.

The Harvey Shops can rebuild buses and older streetcars by stripping the vehicles to their frames, assessing corrosion and repairing or replacing parts as needed. Parts such as, for example, a motor may be rebuilt from more than one used motor. Some parts are manufactured within the building's various shops.

Outside the Harvey Shops, the TTC stores vehicles uneconomical or impractical to repair to eventually strip them for parts to be used in other vehicles.

=== W.E.P. Duncan Building ===
Built in 1985, and named for W. E. P. Duncan, the Duncan shop is the TTC's heavy bus maintenance facility, including rebuilds and major power plant work, to meet the needs of the bus operating divisions. The building also houses the Materials and Procurement Department.

The Duncan Building replaced an obsolete bus maintenance garage in Parkdale, Toronto.

=== H.C. Patten Building ===
The revenue operations building is located at the northwest corner of the site at 835 Davenport Road. The building is named for H. C. Patten, General Manager of the Toronto Transportation Commission from 1939 until 1952.

Opened in the 1980s, the building was designed with security in mind to handle fare media such cash, tickets, tokens, passes and transfers. Because of security, the building has few windows.

=== J.G. Inglis Building ===
The administrative and employment offices are in this building, which is located at the main entrance to the complex. It was named for John G. Inglis in 1991 to honour the man who pioneered the PCC streetcar.

=== David L. Gunn Building ===
The Transit Control Centre is named for David L. Gunn, Chief General Manager of the TTC from 1995 to 1999.

The TTC's Transit Control Centre is located in the three storey Gunn Building at the northeastern corner of the Hillcrest Complex. The facility has 3,800 m^{2} (41,000 sq ft) of space containing mechanical, electrical, and computer equipment, offices and a training area. In addition to subway/SRT train control, the facility monitors traction power, security, fire safety, communications, ventilation and mechanical systems. It monitors all TTC operations including surface routes.

=== Davenport Garage ===
Davenport Garage is a two storey building located at the north edge of the Hillcrest Complex with road access directly from Davenport Road to its second floor. When opened in 1925, it was the main garage for all gasoline-powered TTC vehicles. Later it also served Gray Coach vehicles. On the lower level, there was a repair shop with 10 repair pits and an area for storing parts and materials for bus maintenance. On the upper level, the garage had 4 inspection pits and a wash rack. The garage/repair areas were mothballed from active use as a ‘Bus Division’ in 1993, however the office remains in use for clerical needs. The garage area has been used for storage and parking of non-revenue vehicles with the lower repair areas used to pull parts from retired buses and to store ‘lesser needed’ vehicle parts. With the reallocation of bus routes and equipment, it is known that this division will reactivate in the near future to allow for operations of routes in the immediate vicinity, and the rapid deployments of shuttle buses/spares.

=== Streetcar Way Building ===
In 2019, the TTC opened a new Streetcar Way Building to support rail bending functions which involve bending pieces of rail for curves in streetcar track. The building has 2,700 m^{2} (29,000 sq ft) of floor space. Outside the building, there is 4,000 m^{2} (43,000 sq ft) of space for the pre-assembly of special track work (switches, crossings and connecting curves) and the storage of equipment and materials. Streetcar Way employees formerly located at the Roncesvalles and Russell carhouses were transferred to the new building. The consolidation of way functions at Hillcrest would result in a savings of $1.8 million per year.

=== Other buildings ===
Others buildings include Support Services Building and Subway Operations Building.

== Future ==
As of 2018, the TTC was contemplating several functional changes to the Hillcrest Complex. Changes considered included:

- The TTC has proposed setting up a carhouse at the Hillcrest Complex to serve the 512 St. Clair streetcar route.
- The TTC may repurpose the Davenport Garage for its Training and Vehicle Engineering staff, or to set up a transit museum.
- If the TTC acquires electric buses, then the TTC may maintain them at the Hillcrest Complex drawing on the expertise of existing electrical staff.
- With the conversion of fare media from tickets and tokens to the electronic Presto fare card, the Patten Building's usefulness is in decline. Thus, the TTC is studying alternate uses for the building. However, the TTC still needs to allow cash fares.

=== New carhouse ===
Hillcrest Complex (circa 2026)
- Proposed carhouse track plan

In 2020, the TTC proposed setting up a carhouse at the Hillcrest Complex, to store and service 25 streetcars; the project had a then-estimated cost of $100 million. The TTC would like to have a fleet of 264 streetcars by 2024, but currently has space at the three existing carhouses for only 239. A carhouse at the Hillcrest Complex would serve the nearby 512 St. Clair streetcar route, and would eliminate about 10 kilometres (6 mi) of non-revenue travel to get to the route from other carhouses. The new carhouse might also be used for 511 Bathurst streetcars. The carhouse is to be constructed in two phases:

- Phase 1 would see the installation of new tracks in the yard, overhead wires, an anti-squeal lubrication system and a temporary pre-serving area plus the replacement of tracks within the Harvey Shops.
- Phase 2 would see the installation of a new sanding system and a permanent pre-servicing area.

Construction on the new carhouse officially started in March 2025, and is expected to be completed in 5 years.

== See also ==
- William McBrien Building, TTC headquarters at Davisville station
- St. Clair Carhouse, a former carhouse located near the Hillcrest Complex
