= J. T. Harvey =

J. T. (Jack) Harvey was General Manager of Operations of the Toronto Transportation Commission from 1977 until 1980.

Harvey graduated in 1944 with a B.A.Sc. degree in Electrical Engineering. In 1946 following service in World War II where he achieved the rank of Lieutenant with the Royal Canadian Electrical and Mechanical Engineers, Harvey joined the Toronto Transportation Commission (TTC) as a Junior Engineer in the Electrical Section (Engineering) on power and distribution projects, most notably the trolley overhead infrastructure for the new trolley coach system which opened in 1947. He became Senior Assistant Engineer in 1949, Senior Engineer in 1950, Assistant Electrical Engineer in 1952, during which period he worked on the Yonge Subway. In 1959, he was appointed Chief Design Engineer of the Subway Construction branch. In 1961 he was appointed Assistant Chief Engineer, and in 1962 became Chief Engineer - Subway Construction. He held this position until 1973, when he was appointed General Manager - Subway Construction following the retirement of W. H. (Pat) Paterson.

In 1977, Harvey was appointed General Manager - Operations, and joined W.E.P. Duncan as one of two people to hold both General Manager positions at the TTC to that time. Harvey retired in August 1980 after 34 years with the TTC. He was retained as a consultant to the Urban Transportation Development Corporation (UTDC) on the Hamilton Intermediate Capacity Transit System. (This project was later known as GO-ALRT and was never completed as originally envisioned).

During his career with the TTC, Harvey was active in several professional engineering organisations including the Engineering Institute of Canada, the Canadian Society of Electrical Engineers, and the Association of Professional Engineers of Ontario.

Preceded by W. H. Paterson	General Manager of Subway Construction of the Toronto Transit Commission; 1973-1977	Succeeded by
