= Toronto Transit Commission personnel =

Most Toronto Transit Commission personnel are members of the Amalgamated Transit Union Local 113. Total membership (2016) is approximately 10000 members (drivers, ticket collectors and maintenance workers). The ATU has represented Toronto Transit Commission (TTC) workers since 1899; workers of predecessor operators have been represented by the ATU's predecessor, the Amalgamated Association of Street Railway Employees of America. The president of ATU Local 113 was Bob Kinnear from 2003 to February 2017, Carlos Santos from January 2019 to December 2021 and Marvin Alfred since December 2021.

Another 700 workers (signal, electrical and communications workers) are represented by Canadian Union of Public Employees (CUPE) Local 2.

About 115 station supervisors are represented by CUPE Local 5585. These employees respond to emergency, security and customer incidents at stations, as well as conducting inspections in order to minimize service disruptions.

== Staff positions ==
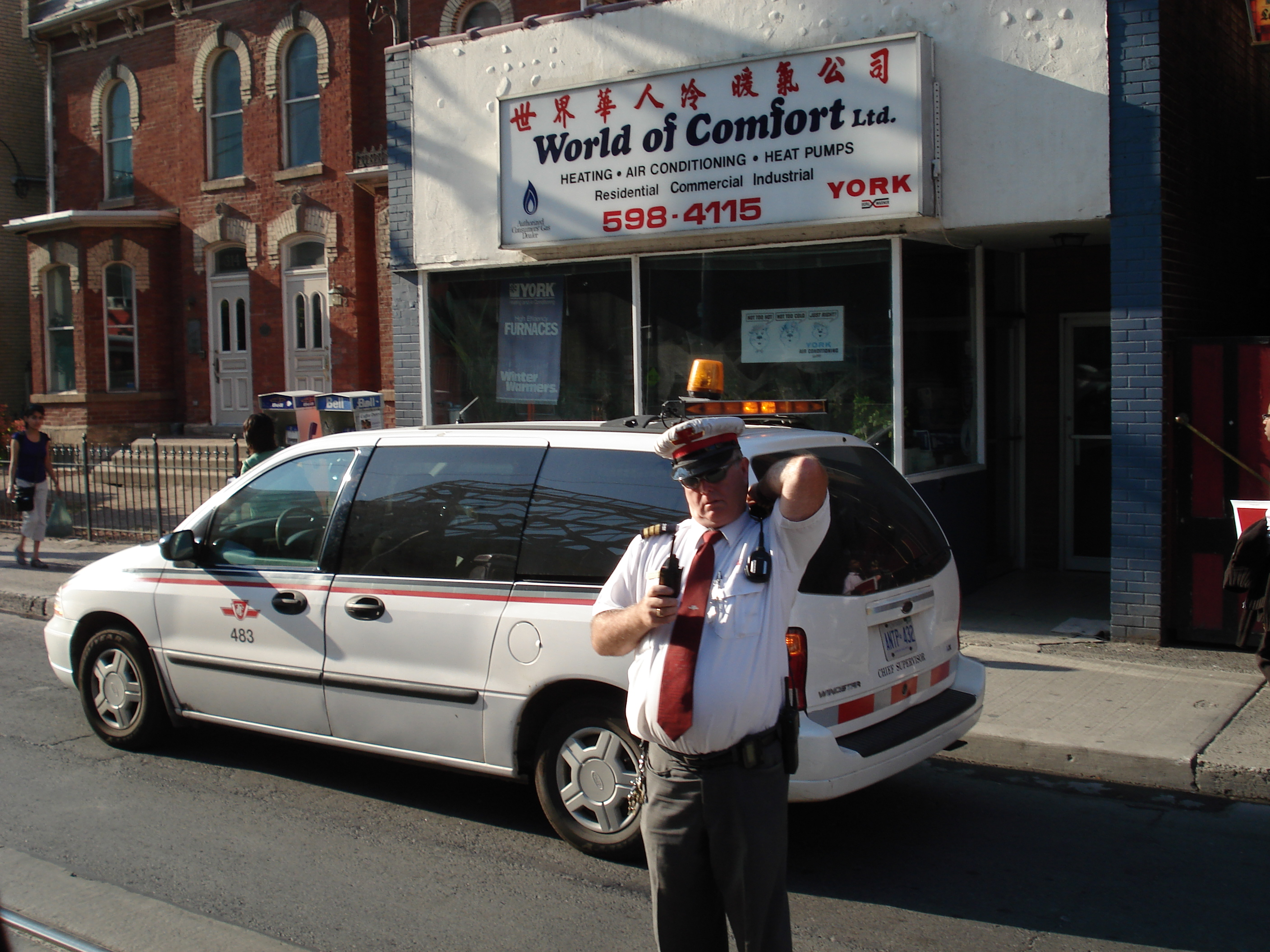
TTC Chief Supervisor on Dundas Street

Other than drivers and supervisors, the TTC also employs support staff to keep the system running:

- maintenance employees to clean vehicles, stations, and other TTC property
- clearing TTC roadways during winter months
- engineers and support staff
- mechanics that maintain all the commission vehicles
- blacksmiths to make special parts, notably for the streetcar fleet

== Union history ==
Unionized transit workers (Toronto Railway Company from 1899 to 1921, then the TTC after 1921) in Toronto began with:

- Amalgamated Association of Street Railway Employees of America in 1892
- Division 30 of the Amalgamated Association of Street and Railway Employees of America in 1893
- Division 113 Chartered – Amalgamated Association of Street Railway Employees of America in 1899
- Amalgamated Association of Street and Railway Employees of America in 1903
- Amalgamated Transit Union in 1964
- Local 113 of the Amalgamated Association of Street, Electric Railway and Motor Coach Employees of America in 1952

== Memorial ==
TTC employees who have lost their lives in the line of duty:

- Reynold Achong – maintenance worker (electrician) hit by train while working on tracks at Summerhill station, June 1, 1982
- Jimmy Trajceski – ticket collector stabbed to death at Victoria Park station, 1995
- Tony Almeida – maintenance worker hit by unsecured scaffolding while removing asbestos from a tunnel south of Lawrence station, April 23, 2007
- Peter Pavlovski – maintenance worker struck by work car while working at track level north of Yorkdale Station, September 14, 2012
- Tom Dedes – maintenance track worker struck by work car and pinned into TTC pickup truck while off-loading equipment at McCowan Yard, October 1, 2017

== 2012 budget process ==
In an effort to cut 10% out of its 2012 operating budget – a request made by the Rob Ford administration to all City departments – the TTC announced that it would have to roll back service on most routes to loading and service standards from 2008. On September 19, 2011, the TTC announced that 250 non-union jobs would be eliminated. The cuts to the non-union positions will consist of both layoffs and "voluntary separation packages". It was also announced that 232 unionized "frontline" (operators and collectors) positions would be eliminated through attrition. It was also revealed that a further 500–600 unionized jobs could be eliminated next year by contracting out various positions in clerical and maintenance related departments.

== Labour disputes ==
Strikes and labour disputes have affected TTC service on various occasions:

- 1952: Strike shuts down TTC service for 19 days
- 1970: Strike, 12 days
- 1974: Strike, 23 days
- 1978: Strike, 8 days
- 1989: Labour disruption, 41 days. (While not an actual strike, service was significantly disrupted.)
- 1991: Strike, 8 days
- April 19, 1999: Strike, 2 days.
- May 29, 2006: Labour dispute, 1 day.
- April 26, 2008: Strike, under 2 days.

In 2011, the provincial government passed the Toronto Transit Commission Labour Disputes Resolution Act (a.k.a. the TTC Act) to prohibit TTC strikes because the TTC was considered to be an essential service. However, in 2023, an Ontario Superior Court judge ruled that the act was unconstitutional as the government failed to show why the TTC is essential. The judge stated that a TTC strike would not endanger anyone's safety or health, and that the government did not prove there would be serious economic consequences.

== Uniforms ==
In September 2014, new uniforms were phased in to replace the existing stock, but some elements remained until new designs are selected or acquired.

For operators and collectors:

- light blue shirt with TTC crest (long and short sleeves)
- grey shorts or slacks
- windbreakers – red/white trim with TTC logo on shoulder and back (new) or maroon with white trim and logo on chest (old)
- winter parkas with grey accents (current) – an attempt to introduce blue jackets in place of the familiar maroon ones in the 1990s failed)
- dark navy blue blazers with TTC crest (current)
- dark navy blue sweaters and sweater vests (current)
- dark navy blue golf-style shirts with TTC crest (current)
- peaked service cap with TTC badge
- ball caps – red with black TTC word mark (new) or blue with white TTC word mark (old)
- dark navy blue toques with TTC lettering during the winter months (current)

For maintenance staff:

- dark blue or green coveralls with TTC crest (current)
- orange fluorescent jacket with a large yellow X with the "TTC" lettering on the back (current)

For senior staff/supervisors similar uniform as operators but peaked hats are worn instead of ball caps.

Prior to the current design, the uniform consisted of a light brown shirt and medium brown slacks and blazers.

== Honour Guard ==
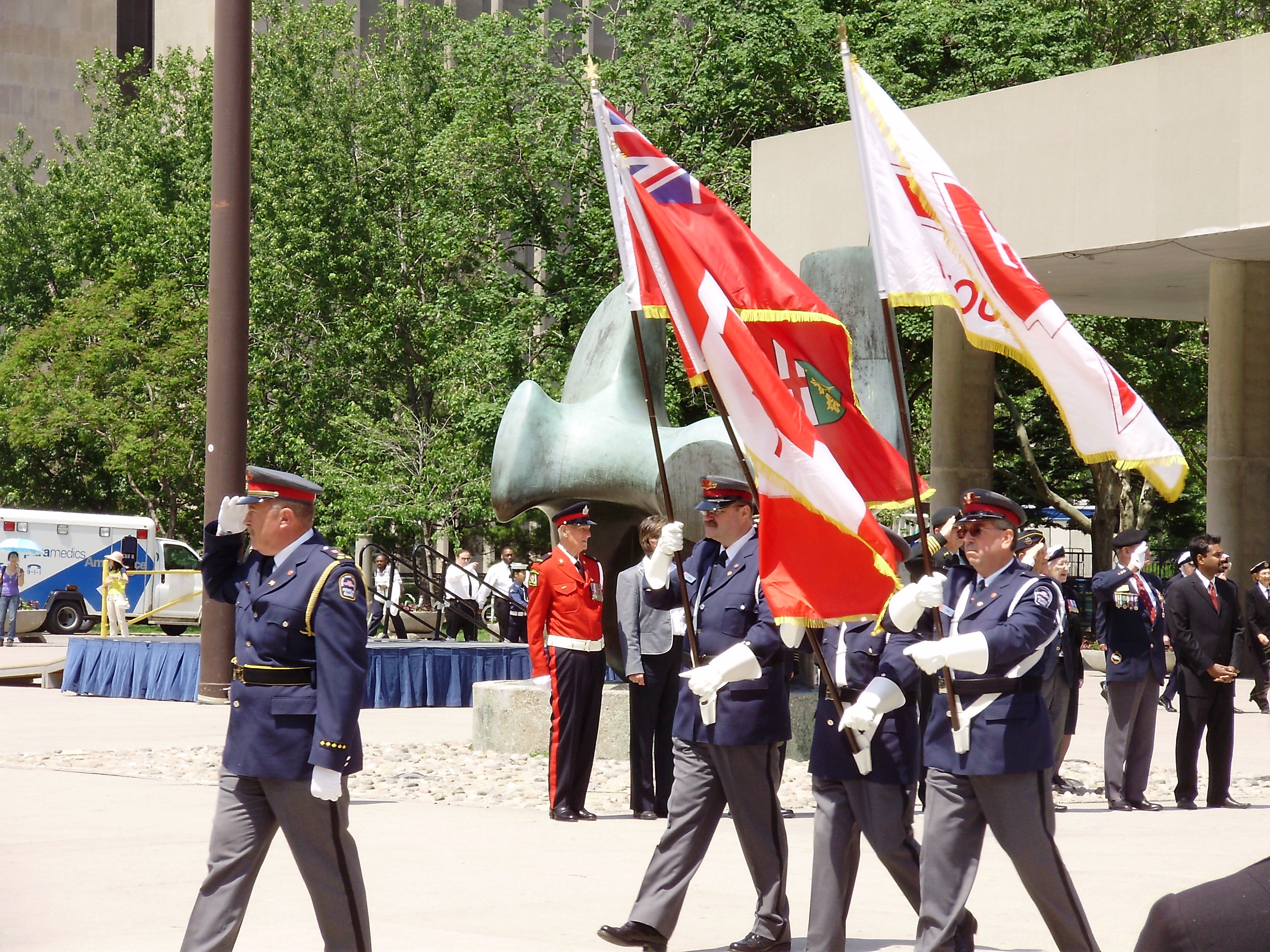
The TTC Honour Guard in Nathan Phillips Square

The TTC Honour Guard represents the TTC at city ceremonies and police funerals. Members wear caps, white shirts, blue blazers with Honour Guard crests and grey pants. The unit was formed in 1994 from TTC Operations supervisory ranks following the funeral for Toronto Police Constable Todd Baylis. The unit had 19 members as of 2001.

== Special constables ==
The TTC Transit Enforcement Unit employs over 50 special constables which are the safety and security division of the transit system. Sworn in by the TTC along with the Toronto Police, York Regional Police and Peel Regional Police services, they patrol properties, vehicles and the subway system throughout the entire area served by the TTC. From 1997 until January 31, 2011, the officers were known as special constables. Between February 1, 2011, and December 31, 2013, the special constables were replaced by bylaw enforcement officers known as "transit enforcement officers", who were primarily tasked with fare evasion enforcement, along with other upholding other statutes in TTC By-law # 1 and some federal and provincial statutes. The officers regained special constable status on January 1, 2014, under a new agreement reached by the TTC and the Toronto Police Service.
