= Richard Ducharme =

Richard C. Ducharme P.Eng. (born 1948) has been an administrator for several Canadian transit and transportation authorities, most recently as General Manager of Transportation for the City of Edmonton.

Ducharme graduated from the University of Waterloo as a civil engineer in 1972 and joined Ontario's Ministry of Transportation. He then moved on to GO Transit as a transit coordinator in 1976. He had various roles and eventually became managing director in 1993. In 1999 he left GO Transit to join the Toronto Transit Commission as General Manager, replacing David Gunn who announced his retirement on October 7, 1998.

Ducharme initially had a better relationship with former TTC Chair Howard Moscoe and other politicians. However, after a wildcat strike staged by the Amalgamated Transit Union, Local 113, Ducharme found out that there were talks between Moscoe and ATU President Bob Kinnear that bypassed TTC management. Ducharme stated that these discussions undermined his authority to negotiate with the union. He also criticized Moscoe for making Bombardier the sole supplier of new subway cars for the TTC, arguing that the lack of competition in the bidding process would cost the city $100 million. Moscoe claimed that he had a responsibility to intervene to prevent another strike, and that the Bombardier contract would keep jobs in Canada. Ducharme stated on June 6, 2006, that he would step down on November 30, 2006, but his departure was fast-tracked by Moscoe and the other TTC Commissioners after Ducharme made his criticism of Moscoe public.

Ducharme was replaced on June 10, 2006, on an interim basis by TTC General Manager of Operations Gary Webster.

On October 10, 2006, Ducharme started a new job in Edmonton, Alberta as General Manager of Transportation, overseeing the expansion of the city's roads and light-rail transit system. After only four months in the post, he announced his resignation on February 8, 2007, effective April 13, 2007.

== See also ==
- List of University of Waterloo people

Preceded by Al Leach	Managing Director of GO Transit; 1993–1999	Succeeded by Gary McNeil
Preceded by David L. Gunn	Chief General Manager of the Toronto Transit Commission; 1999–2006	Succeeded by Gary Webster
Preceded by Rick Millican	General Manager of Transportation in Edmonton; 2006–2007	Succeeded by Robert Boutilier
