= Atwood, Ontario =

Atwood
- Village
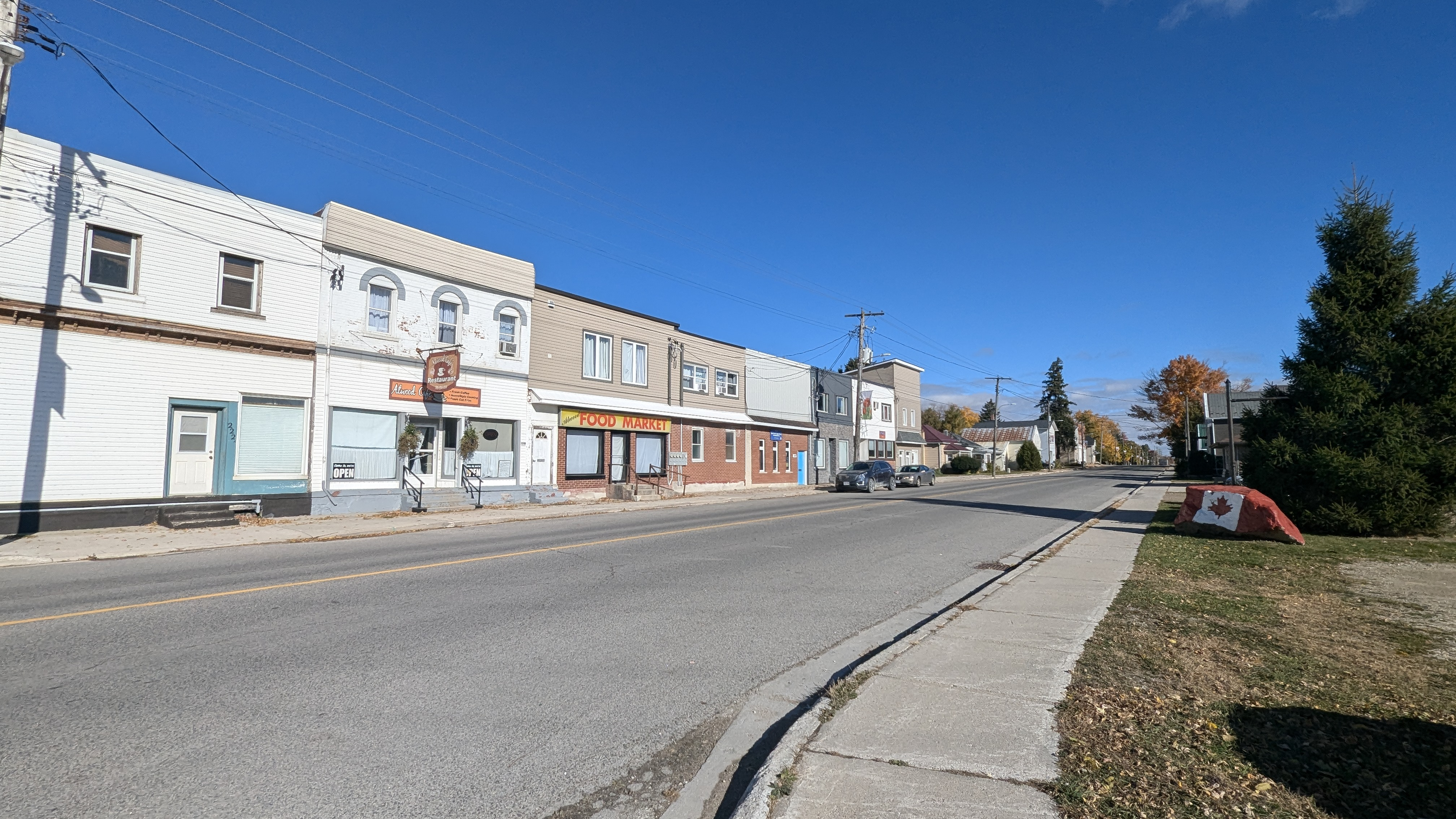
- Interactive map of Atwood
- Coordinates: 43°40′6″N 81°1′7″W
- Country: Canada
- Province: Ontario
- County: Perth
- Township: North Perth

Government
  - Type: Municipality of North Perth
- Elevation: 368 m (1,207 ft)
- Time zone: UTC-5 (EST)
  - Summer (DST): UTC-4 (EDT)
- Area code: 519

Atwood is a small town located in Perth County, Ontario, Canada. Nearby centres include Listowel and Elmira. Atwood is located on Highway 23 between Perth Line 75 (formerly 8th Concession) and Perth Line 72.

Atwood/Coghlin Airport is located here.

== History ==
The settlement dates back to 1854 when it was originally named “Elma Centre”. When the railway came through in 1876, the name was changed to “Newry Station”. The current name, Atwood, was suggested in 1883 by William Dunn after his niece Eliza Gray, of Detroit, had noticed that the new hamlet was surrounded by woods .

The “Atwood WG&B Ry Station” was built in 1877. The station closed in 1969 and was later demolished.

In 2011, Kenneth Rea, a volunteer firefighter from Atwood, was killed battling a fire in Listowel when the roof of the building collapsed.

== Notable people ==
- John G. Inglis, electrical engineer and transit manager.
- William Angus Dickson, Canadian politician and member of the Legislative Assembly of Ontario
