= 2008 Toronto Transit Commission strike =

Strike action by Toronto Transit Commission employees

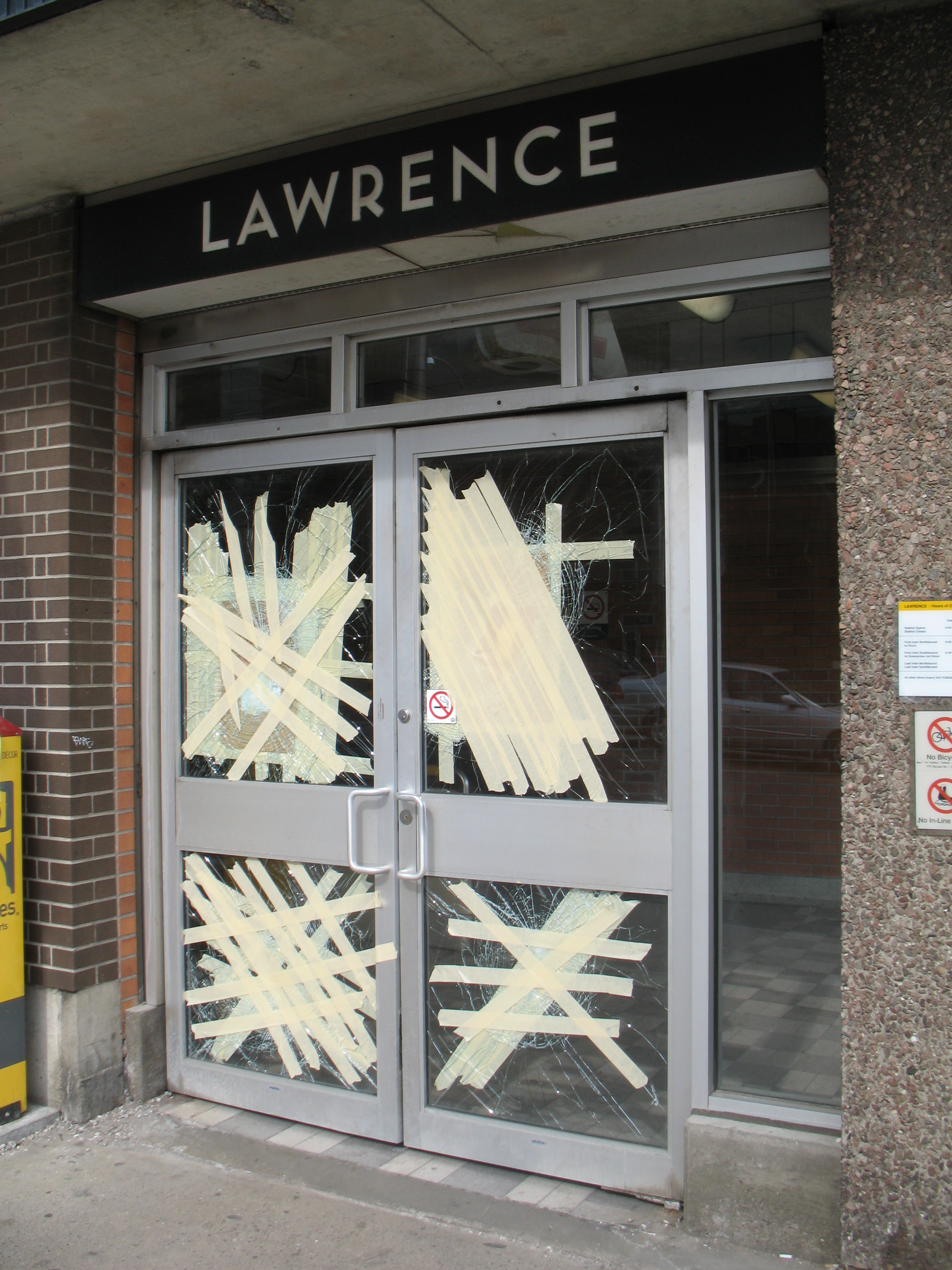
Damage caused during the labour disruption

On April 26, 2008, employees at the Toronto Transit Commission (TTC) went on strike. All TTC bus, streetcar and subway service was suspended, leaving thousands of people stranded across the city. Although the strike action was legal, the Amalgamated Transit Union (ATU) Local 113 did not provide 48-hour notice of the service withdrawal as they had previously promised they would do. Instead, the ATU only provided 90 minutes' notice before the service withdrawal. Bob Kinnear, president of ATU Local 113, claimed that the lack of an advance notice was necessary to protect the TTC employees from "angry and irrational members of the public".

== General synopsis ==
The strike occurred when the two unions, ATU Local 113 and Canadian Union of Public Employees Local 2, voted 65% to reject the offer made on April 20, 2008. The result of the ratification vote was completed just after 10:00 p.m. on April 25 and Torontonians and TTC employees were given approximately 90 minutes' notice before the job action began.

The rejected offer had offered TTC operators a 3% wage increase each year for three years. Some operators and maintenance staff were not pleased with the offer. There were also concerns over the injury compensation package and, according to some reports, contracting out work. TTC employees voiced their concerns over the week prior to the strike.

=== Back-to-work legislation ===
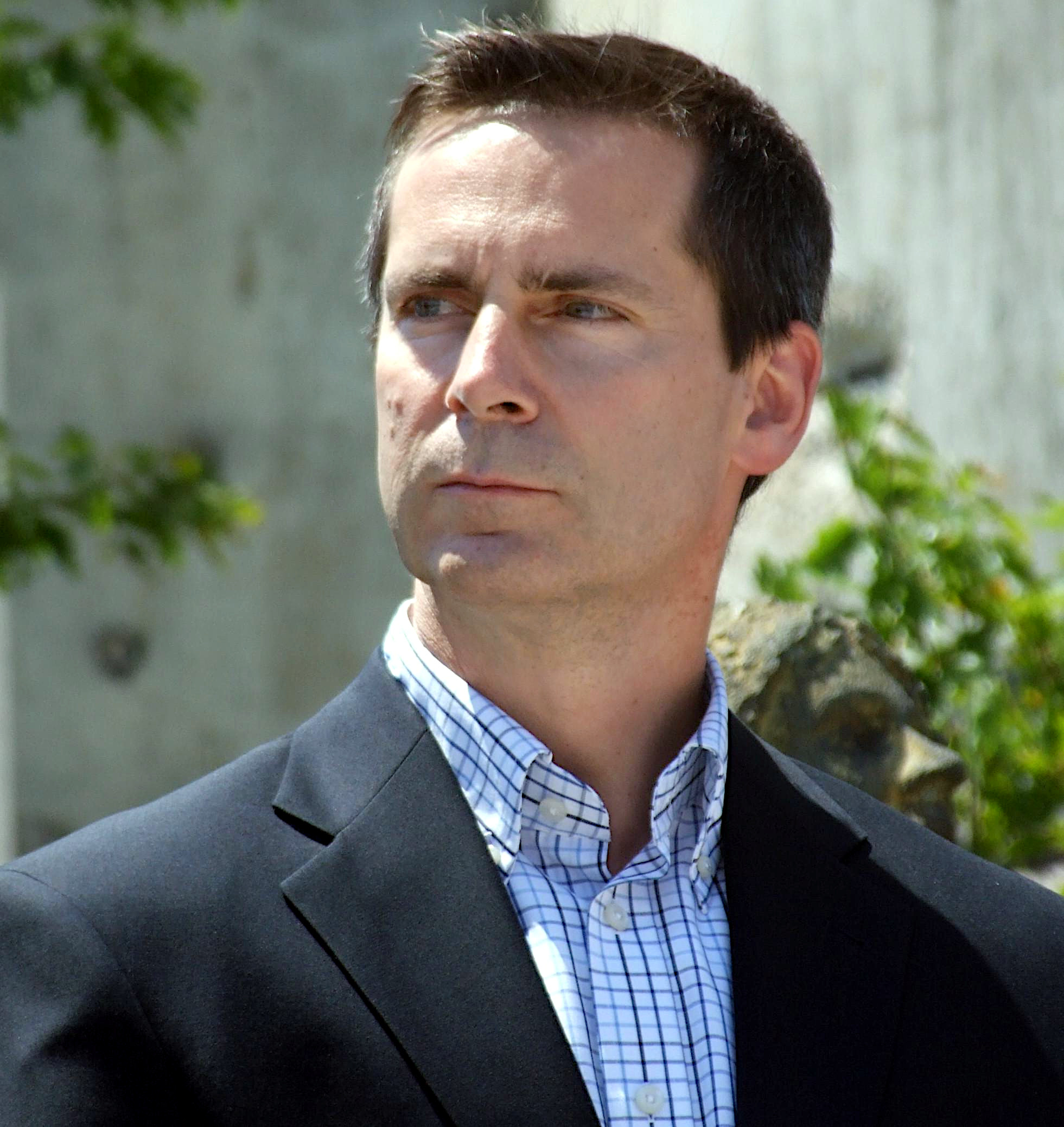
Ontario premier Dalton McGuinty

At approximately 11:45 p.m. on April 25, minutes before the strike began, Toronto mayor David Miller held a news conference stating that the strike action was "unacceptable and irresponsible" after the ATU failed to comply with the initial 48-hour strike notice and the subsequent rejection of the contract. The mayor made a special request to Ontario premier Dalton McGuinty asking him to seek back-to-work legislation, a special law that would block the TTC strike from continuing. By 12:30 p.m. on April 26, the provincial government had signed an Order in Council allowing for a rare Sunday sitting of the Ontario legislature to consider a bill (Bill 66) to order the union and its members back to work.

On April 27, 2008, Bill 66 was unanimously passed by the Ontario Legislature, a process which only took 30 minutes. The law was quickly given royal assent by David Onley, the Lieutenant Governor of Ontario, and it came into force at 2 p.m. The TTC was given a few hours to ensure the system was ready to operate and to build up service. Most transit service resumed by that evening.

== Offer ==
- Term: three years, expiring March 31, 2011
- Wages: April 1, 2008 – 3%; April 1, 2009 – 3%; April 1, 2010 – 3%
- Vision Care: $300 every 2 years; plus $50 for exams
- Dental Care: major restorative, including implants up to $2,500
- Orthodontic: up to $4,000 (50% TTC coverage)
- Physio & Chiro: $1,000 max ($35 per visit)
- Long-term Disability: $2,550 max, per month

Source: TTC

== See also ==
- 2006 Toronto Transit Commission wildcat strike
- Adam Giambrone, city councillor and Chair of the TTC
- Toronto Transit Commission personnel
