= Gary Webster (engineer) =

Gary M. Webster is the former Chief General Manager of the Toronto Transit Commission in Toronto, Ontario, Canada.

== Education and early career ==
Webster graduated from Queen's University as a civil engineer in 1975 and joined the Toronto Transit Commission soon afterwards. He served in various supervisory and management roles at the TTC, including in the subway and equipment maintenance departments, in the Transportation department, as Manager - Materials and Procurement (1986–1990), Manager - Service Planning (1990–1994), Manager - Human Resources (1994–1996), and General Manager - Operations (1996–2006).

== TTC Chief General Manager ==
On June 10, 2006 he replaced Rick Ducharme as Chief General Manager on an interim basis after Ducharme's resignation. A year later, on June 27, 2007, Webster was confirmed in the post on a permanent basis. He was the first TTC Chief General Manager to be promoted from within the organization; all five previous holders of the position had been hired from outside the TTC.

=== Termination ===
In February 2012, Webster was called before City Council with regard to the future of transit planning in the city. He answered questions relating to whether subway or light rail transit would be more favorable. His testimony was not supportive of Mayor Rob Ford's position that underground was the only way for Toronto to move forward.

In early February 2012 TTC Commissioners Norm Kelly, Vincent Crisanti, Frank Di Giorgio, Denzil Minnan-Wong and Cesar Palacio signed a petition for a special Commission meeting that was held on February 21 to discuss a "personnel issue". The "personnel issue" related to Webster's future as General Manager at the TTC, and he was fired. A vote by the board ousted Webster 5-4. His firing provoked outrage by some fellow Toronto city councillors.

On February 23, 2012, the Toronto Star reported that according to his contract, Webster would be paid more than $560,000 in salary (plus benefits) over two years, in compensation for being fired without just cause.

Preceded by Rick Ducharme	Chief General Manager of the Toronto Transit Commission; 2006-2012	Succeeded by Andy Byford (as Chief Executive Officer)
