= H. H. Couzens =

British electrical engineer

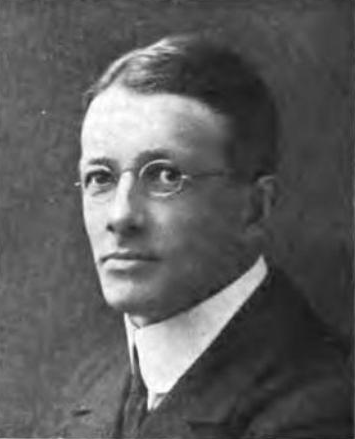
- Born: Herbert Henry Couzens; 16 October 1877; Totnes, England
- Died: 17 November 1944 (aged 67); Ilford, England
- Education: Taunton School
- Occupation: Electrical engineer
- Spouse: Elsie Annie Goodman (m. 1902)

Sir Herbert Henry Couzens KBE (16 October 1877 – 17 November 1944) was a British electrical engineering executive who managed public utilities in England, Canada, and Brazil.

== Career ==
H. H. Couzens was born in Totnes on 16 October 1877. He attended the Taunton School, and married Elsie Annie Goodman on 11 August 1902.

He was an electrical engineer for West Ham in London, England, when he was recruited in 1913 to head the new Toronto Hydro Electric Commission in Toronto, Ontario, Canada. He was instrumental in guiding the early development and expansion of the publicly owned electric network in Toronto.

Seven years later, in September 1920, he also became the first General Manager of the Toronto Transportation Commission (TTC), which had been established earlier that year to take over several privately and publicly owned street railway operations. He managed the integration of the different streetcar networks into one unified system, and oversaw the extensive rebuilding and reequipping of the TTC that took place throughout the early 1920s.

=== Job change ===
Couzens resigned his positions as general manager of Toronto Hydro and of the TTC in 1924, and joined the Brazilian Traction, Light and Power Co., a Canadian-owned utility based in Brazil, with extensive holdings in South America, and later became vice-president of the company. In 1937 he moved from Rio de Janeiro to England to work for the firm, and was knighted that same year. He returned to Toronto in 1941 as president of the company.

== Death ==
In 1944, on a business trip to Brazil, he became ill and later died in Ilford, England on 17 November 1944.

Preceded by None	General Manager of the Toronto Transportation Commission; 1920–1924	Succeeded by D.W. Harvey
