= 2006 Toronto Transit Commission wildcat strike =

Unlawful strike in Toronto, Ontario, Canada

Toronto Transit Commission wildcat strike
- Date: May 29, 2006
- Location: Toronto, Ontario, Canada
- Caused by: proposed changes in work schedules
- Methods: strike action

Parties
TTC mechanical and janitorial workers	Toronto Transit Commission

On May 29, 2006, 800 Toronto Transit Commission mechanical and janitorial workers who were protesting proposed changes in work schedules, including permanent reassignment of 100 workers to night shifts, went on strike.

The strike began between 4 a.m. and 5 a.m. EDT, and quickly resulted in a large scale disruption of service when transit drivers honoured the picket line, effectively shutting down the Toronto transit system. The shutdown left over a million commuters searching for alternative means of transport and cost an estimated $3 million in lost revenues.

By 7 a.m. the Ontario Labour Relations Board (OLRB) issued a cease-and-desist order to pickets; this order was ignored. A further back-to-work directive was forwarded by the OLRB, and eventually Amalgamated Transit Union officials requested that workers comply, the call coming just before 3 p.m. EDT. Given the logistical difficulties, limited service slowly increased, with full service resuming later in the evening.

== Synopsis ==
Workers argued there was a declining state of conditions since the latest collective bargaining agreement was ratified, and worker morale was discontent. Workers perceived a lack of good health premiums, arbitrary shift changes, lack of action on operator safety, among other grievances assembled by the Amalgamated Transit Union (ATU) Local 113.

A series of rebuttals were assembled by management executives and several commissioners against the union's grievances. Union detractors suggested that inroads were made to improve working conditions for operators. Among several recommendations laid out by a union-management joint task force, suggestions included installing cameras and operator barriers. This approach to union grievances gave management public sympathy. Some experts in worker relations suggested a wildcat strike would have been unfathomable if relations were amicable.

Signs of impending strike action were becoming apparent to those inside the TTC. Evidence is seen in a press conference held by union executives days before the strike action. As well, Bob Kinnear, president of ATU Local 113, issued a series of automated messages to his constituents who numbered up to and around 8,500 TTC workers. He informed them that many of the most critical issues had yet to be resolved through joint negotiations with management. Although Kinnear's comments never implied any form of job action, it was suggested that many members of the union took his messages as such.

The wildcat strike which took place on the May 29, 2006, was not initiated by joint action of all the unionized workers in the TTC. Picket lines were assembled by a relatively small number of mechanical and janitorial workers (approximately 800) across many of the TTC's yards and garages; locations that housed buses, streetcars, and subway trains. Many operators who showed up for their morning shift joined their co-workers in a sign of solidarity, and the remainder were asked by the TTC not to cross the picket lines. Without the operators passing through the picket lines, transit service was halted.

Over 700,000 commuters were forced to find alternate forms of transportation for the day. The bewilderment observed on the faces of many early-day commuters speaks volumes as to the spontaneity of the strike. The public was essentially left in the dark throughout the build-up of tensions within the TTC. The day was also notable as it was the hottest day of the year to that point, with the temperature peaking 40 degrees Celsius when the humidex was added in.

Rumours of the strike only hit the news very late on Sunday night, and many who were sleeping or working at the time had no way of knowing what was waiting for them in the morning. Finding alternate forms of transportation, some people who became aware of the strike action had to tell others at bus and streetcar stops along their way. Some decided to walk as there was no other option at their disposal. Both management and union members were fully aware of this state of discord. Even though the wildcat strike itself was a surprise, some suggest that the stressed relationship between these two parties should have been indicators on their own right. The strike began at 12 am for maintenance employees and the bus drivers and streetcar and subway operators followed early in the morning.

At around noon, the Ontario Labour Relations Board (OLRB) "issue[d] a cease and desist order requiring workers to report back to work immediately." This order was completely ignored by picketers. Shop stewards kept strikers in line by advising them to await orders from Kinnear himself. A couple hours later, the OLRB reassembled, dispatching a back-to-work order, reinforcing their earlier promulgation. Kinnear remained defiant throughout the wildcat strike, but eventually bowed to pressure and advised all picketing workers to return to work. Rogue picket lines that refused to dissolve were done so through the assistance of the Toronto Police Service.

== Aftermath ==
Immediately after the strike's end, several members of Toronto City Council, along with countless commuters, saw recourse in the idea of enforcing strict disciplinary penalties against the union and its membership. Toronto mayor David Miller, contrary to pro-union inclinations of the past, introduced the idea of prosecuting the Amalgamated Transit Union, a strategic move that paralleled the opinions of his constituents. If such a route were to proceed, it had been suggested that individual fines for the over 800 mechanical and janitorial workers who started the picket lines would be one of the prosecution's top priorities, behind charging the union itself. This externalized approach to dealing with lost revenue was inspired by a similar event that erupted in New York City during the winter of 2005. New York's transit strike ended with a union boss being given a short prison sentence, while the union itself was fined for the economic disruption it caused. Kinnear brushed off suggestions that he too was in line for incarceration. Instead, he embraced the idea, signifying his willingness to act as the union's martyr.

On May 31, 2006, Local 113 published an attack ad against commission chair Howard Moscoe, Miller, and Rick Ducharme, chief general manager of the TTC. In it, the union argued that negligent and careless behaviour by the three men, essentially reflecting management's posture, had led Bobby Lowe, a bus operator who was physically assaulted on shift, into disparity. The ad effectively illustrated how Lowe's life was ruined as a result of receiving deficient forms of compensation from the commission, due to their overall laissez-faire stance on the issue of operator safety. After Moscoe rebuked the ad with scathing criticisms of its accuracy, Lowe himself visited Moscoe in his city hall office, illustrating his discontent over the allegations. Moscoe later retracted most of his comments. Some saw the attack ad as the essential variable that legitimized the wildcat strike, while others saw it as the union's complacency over other contentious issues such as the state of janitorial and mechanical workers, an issue that was seen as less media friendly in comparison to the matter of operator safety. It had also been suggested that if the union had moved forward with a similar Public Relations campaign before the wildcat strike, they would have received more sympathy from the public. Some also accused the union of foul play by not concentrating on the problems facing initial strikers themselves.

The power struggle between management, the commissioners, and the union eventually ended with Rick Ducharme's resignation on June 6, 2006. Ducharme had criticized the councillors on the TTC board for interfering with labour negotiations, as there were closed door meetings between TTC commissioners and the union which excluded management; management was the traditional negotiator with the union, not the board.

At the end of 2007, the TTC dropped its $3 million lawsuit against the union, while the event was no longer referred to as a "wildcat strike", but an incident.

== See also ==
- Strike action
- Toronto Transit Commission
- 2008 TTC strike
- Toronto Transit Commission personnel
