= Bob Kinnear =

Canadian union leader (born 1970/71)

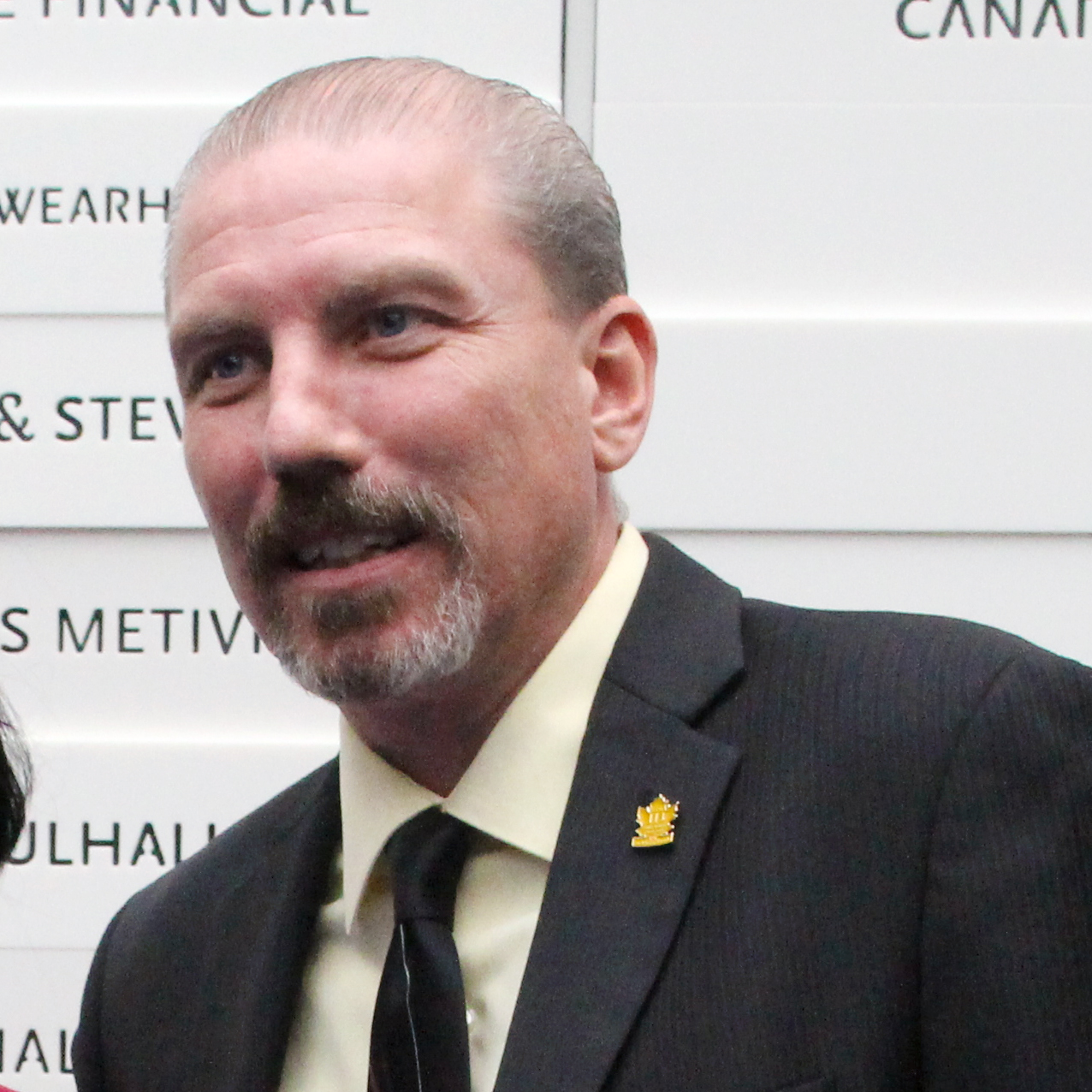
Bob Kinnear in 2014

Bob Kinnear (born 1970–1971) is a union leader in Toronto, Ontario, Canada. He was the leader of the Amalgamated Transit Union Local 113 (ATU 113) from 2003 to 2017. Kinnear joined the TTC as a janitor in 1988 at age 18 and worked his way up as bus operator and subway guard/operator before becoming union head.

ATU 113 represents approximately 9,000 TTC workers and approximately 200 workers at Transdev (Viva Rapid Transit) in York Region. Kinnear was removed on February 3, 2017 by the local's international parent ATU and replaced with an interim trusteeship. His father, Larry Kinner, was part of the ATU 113 leadership for 12 years before departing to work for the parent ATU as international vice-president until 2016.

== Controversy and labour actions ==
Kinnear is a controversial labor leader due to job actions involving his union. He has been vocal about issues surrounding employee safety and security due to numerous attacks on the employees he represents. He also demands that bus, train, and streetcar drivers, as well as cashiers, make $27–29 an hour (base wage) with many making more than $100,000. The Toronto Star once called him the "most hated man in Toronto"

Bob Kinnear was head of Local 113 at the time of the following job actions:

- 2006 Toronto Transit Commission wildcat strike
- 2008 TTC strike
- 2008 Viva Rapid Transit strike in York Region
- 2011-February 2012 Viva strike in York Region (co-ordinated with ATU Local 1587 so the North and South-west division of York Region Transit would also be on strike).

== See also ==
- Toronto Transit Commission personnel
