= John G. Inglis =

John Gordon Inglis B.A.Sc. (1899 – November 18, 1990) was a Canadian electrical engineer and transit manager.

He was born in Atwood, Ontario, and graduated with a degree in electrical engineering from the University of Toronto in 1923, then known as SPS - The School of Practical Science (the OLD SKULEHOUSE). He worked for ten years at the Westinghouse Electric Company in East Pittsburgh, Pennsylvania, where he was involved in the early development of the PCC streetcar. He left Westinghouse to become electrical engineer for the Co-operative Transit Company in Wheeling, West Virginia. Because of his experience with the new PCC streetcars, he returned to Canada in 1936 and joined the Rolling Stock Department of the Toronto Transportation Commission. He occupied increasingly important responsibilities until 1959, when he became general manager – operations. During his career he guided the TTC’s acquisition and operation of the world's largest PCC fleet, and was responsible for the TTC’s adoption in the early 1960s of aluminium-bodied 23-metre-long subway cars (see M-series (Toronto subway car)).

The former Administration Building at the TTC's Hillcrest Complex was named the J.G. Inglis building in 1991 in his honour.

Preceded by W.E.P. Duncan	General Manager – Operations of the Toronto Transit Commission; 1959–1968	Succeeded by James H. Kearns
