= H. C. Patten =

General Manager of the Toronto Transportation Commission
- In office January 1, 1939 – 1952
- Preceded by: D. W. Harvey
- Succeeded by: W. E. P. Duncan

Personal details
- Born: Henry C. Patten; 1887 Boston, Massachusetts, U.S.
- Died: January 30, 1956 (aged 68–69)
- Education: Massachusetts Institute of Technology
- Occupation: Engineer, businessman

Military service
- Allegiance: United States
- Branch/service: United States Army
- Unit: United States Army Corps of Engineers
- Battles/wars: World War I

Henry C. Patten (1887 – January 30, 1956) was General Manager of the Toronto Transportation Commission from 1939 until 1952.

He was born in Boston, Massachusetts, and graduated from the Massachusetts Institute of Technology in 1908 with a degree in electrical engineering. He served in the U.S. Army Engineering Corps for two years during World War I, and was otherwise employed by the consulting engineering firm of Jackson and Moreland, working on projects involving railways and other utilities.

He came to Toronto in 1920 as a resident engineer with Jackson and Moreland, who had been engaged by the City of Toronto government to assist with the arbitration and valuation of the City's purchase of the property of the Toronto Railway Company. In November 1923, he left the engineering firm to join the Toronto Transportation Commission as a Cost Engineer. In May 1924 he was appointed Comptroller.

He was appointed General Manager effective January 1, 1939, following the death in December 1938 of D.W. Harvey. He served as General Manager until 1952.

Mr. Patten also served as President of the Canadian Transit Association, director of the American Transit Association and director of the Toronto Industrial Commission. Patten died in Toronto in 1956.

The revenue building at the TTC's Hillcrest Complex is named the Patten Building in his honour.

| Preceded by D.W. Harvey | General Manager of the Toronto Transportation Commission; 1939–1952 | Succeeded by W.E.P. Duncan |
