= D. W. Harvey =

General Manager of the Toronto Transportation Commission
- In office May 1, 1924 – December 6, 1938
- Preceded by: H. H. Couzens
- Succeeded by: H. C. Patten

Personal details
- Born: David William Harvey; February 24, 1887 London, Ontario, Canada
- Died: December 6, 1938 (aged 51)
- Education: University of Toronto (BASc)
- Occupation: Engineer; transportation manager

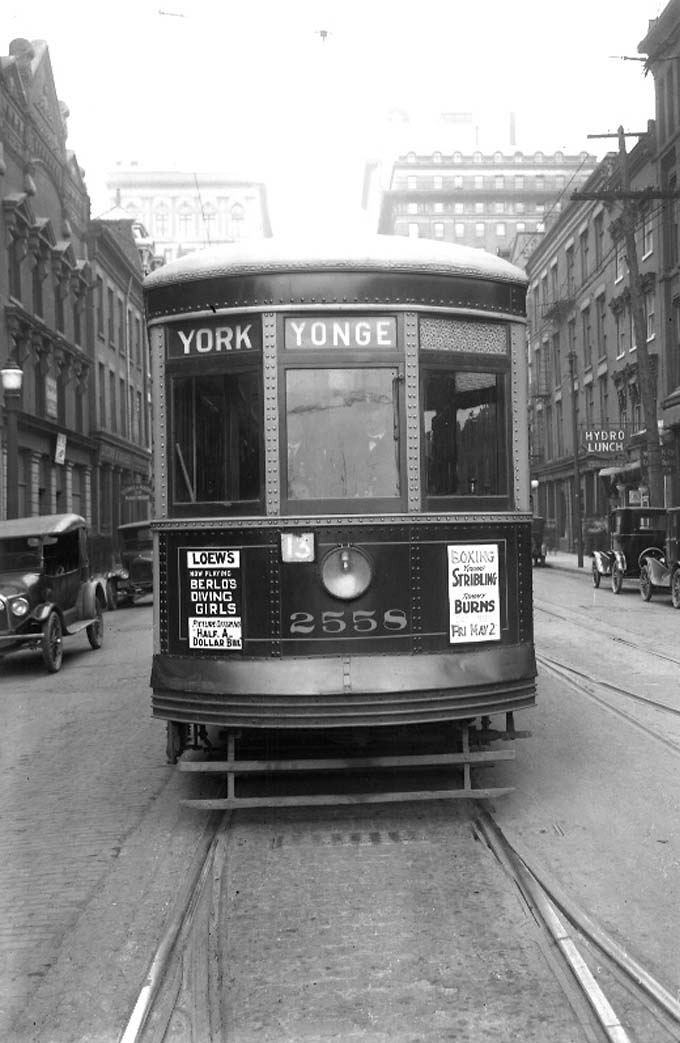
Streetcar Yonge Street in Toronto

David William Harvey, B.A.Sc., M.E.I.C. (February 24, 1887 – December 6, 1938) was a Canadian engineer and transportation manager. He was a key player in the early development of the Toronto Transportation Commission and served as the transit operator's second General Manager, from 1924 until his death in 1938.

He was born in London, Ontario, and graduated from the University of Toronto with a degree in Civil Engineering. In 1910 he worked for the Ontario Power Company at Niagara Falls. The next year he became Resident Engineer of the Railway and Bridge Section of the City of Toronto government Works Department. He was in charge of both construction and operation of the new Toronto Civic Railways, a loose network of four streetcar lines that was built by the City of Toronto because the privately owned Toronto Railway Company refused to build new lines to serve developing districts. On September 1, 1921, Harvey became Assistant Manager of the new Toronto Transportation Commission, which merged and consolidated most public and private street railways in Toronto. He became General Manager on May 1, 1924, after H. H. Couzens, the first General Manager, resigned.

Harvey was a well-liked and effective manager, who had excellent knowledge of the technical aspects of operating and maintaining a transit system. He personally held several patents for transit equipment, including the design of a three-door trailer, pulled by Peter Witt-type motor cars, that significantly speeded up boarding times, compared to the two-door trailers that were previously operated. He introduced motor buses on lightly travelled feeder routes, and presided over the creation and expansion of Gray Coach Lines, the TTC's intercity motor coach operator.

The main shop facility at the TTC Hillcrest Complex on Bathurst Street, which opened in 1924, was renamed D.W. Harvey Shops in his honour.

Preceded by H.H. Couzens	General Manager of the Toronto Transportation Commission; 1924–1938	Succeeded by H.C. Patten
