= W. E. P. Duncan =

Wilfred Eben Pinkerton Duncan (1897 – 28 January 1977) was an important figure in the early period of the Toronto Transit Commission's history.

He was born in Glasgow, Scotland, and graduated with a B.Sc. degree in engineering from Glasgow University. He emigrated to Canada and worked from 1910 to 1914 in the construction department of the Canadian Pacific Railway. Between 1915 and 1919 he served overseas in the Great War with the Canadian Expeditionary Force and the Royal Engineers, attaining the rank of Major. After the war he worked as a construction engineer in Toronto. He joined the Toronto Transportation Commission in 1921, and served in various engineering roles. By 1945 he was the TTC's Chief Engineer, and he became General Manager, the senior staff position, in 1952. In 1959, when the senior position was split in two, he became General Manager – Subway Construction, while John G. Inglis assumed the role of General Manager – Operations. Duncan retired in 1961 but remained active as a General Consultant to the TTC until the opening of the University Subway in 1963.

He was instrumental in the growth of the system and was in charge of the TTC during the building of the Yonge Subway.

The Duncan Shops, a heavy bus maintenance facility at the TTC's Hillcrest Complex, is named in his honour.

Preceded by H.C. Patten	General Manager of the Toronto Transportation Commission/Toronto Transit Commission; 1952–1959	Succeeded by John G. Inglis
