= Parkdale station =

Parkdale station may refer to:

- Parkdale railway station, Victoria, Australia
- Parkdale station (Toronto), Ontario, Canada; aka North Parkdale railway station

== See also ==
- South Parkdale station, Parkdale, Toronto, Ontario, Canada; a passenger rail station
- Sunnyside station (Toronto), Parkdale, Toronto, Ontario, Canada; a passenger rail station;
- Parkdale (disambiguation)
