= Parkdale =

Parkdale can refer to several different things:

== Places ==
=== Canada ===
==== Communities ====
- Parkdale, Calgary, a neighbourhood in the city of Calgary, Alberta
- Parkdale, Edmonton, a neighbourhood in the city of Edmonton, Alberta
- Parkdale, Lunenburg, Nova Scotia
- Parkdale, Halifax, Nova Scotia
- Parkdale, Toronto, a neighbourhood in the city of Toronto, Ontario
- Parkdale, Prince Edward Island, a neighbourhood in the city of Charlottetown, Prince Edward Island
- Rural Municipality of Parkdale No. 498, Saskatchewan

==== Electoral Districts ====
- Parkdale-Belvedere, a provincial electoral district in Prince Edward Island
- Parkdale—High Park, a federal House of Commons of Canada electoral district located in Toronto, Canada
- Parkdale—High Park (provincial electoral district), a provincial Legislative Assembly of Ontario electoral district located in Toronto, Ontario, Canada
- Parkdale (federal electoral district), a defunct Canadian House of Commons district in Toronto, Canada
- Parkdale (provincial electoral district), a defunct Legislative Assembly of Ontario district in Toronto, Ontario, Canada

=== Oceania ===
- Parkdale, Victoria, Australia
  - Parkdale railway station
- Parkdale, New Zealand

=== United States ===
- Parkdale, Arkansas
- Parkdale, Colorado
- Parkdale, Michigan
- Parkdale, Minnesota
- Parkdale, Missouri
- Parkdale (Charlotte neighborhood), North Carolina
- Parkdale, Oregon

== Schools ==
- Parkdale High School a school in Riverdale Park, Maryland, USA
- Parkdale School, a K-9 school in Parkdale, Edmonton, Alberta, Canada
- Parkdale School, Hamilton, a K-5 school in Hamilton, Ontario, Canada

== Other uses ==
- Parkdale Mall, a shopping mall located in Beaumont, Texas, U.S.
- "Parkdale", a song by Metric from the album Grow Up and Blow Away

== See also ==
- Parkdale Avenue (disambiguation)
- Parkdale station (disambiguation)
- Parksdale
- Park (disambiguation)
- Dale (disambiguation)
