= Parkdale station (Toronto) =

Railway station in Toronto, Ontario, Canada

Parkdale
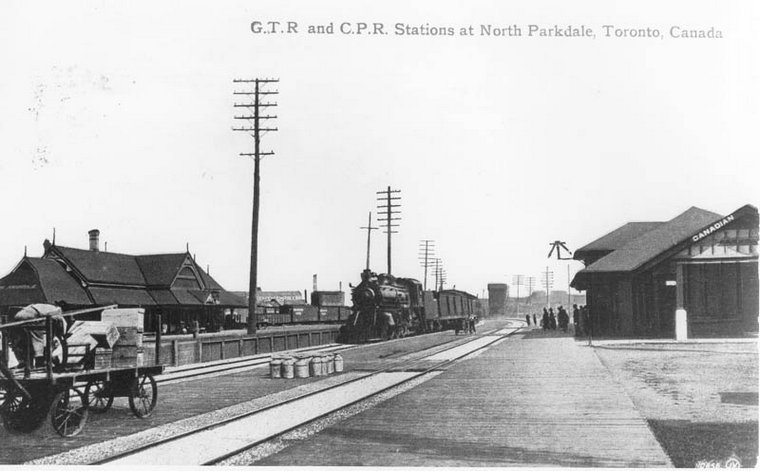
- GTR and CPR North Parkdale stations, circa 1900

General information
- Location: Queen Street West; Parkdale, Toronto, Ontario; Canada
- Coordinates: 43°38′31″N 79°25′39″W

Former services
Preceding station	Canadian National Railway	Following station
St. Clair Avenue toward North Bay	North Bay – Toronto	Toronto Terminus
West Toronto toward Sarnia	Sarnia – Toronto via Lucan Crossing	Toronto Terminus
Preceding station	Canadian Pacific Railway	Following station
West Toronto toward Detroit	Detroit – Montreal	Toronto toward Montreal Windsor
West Toronto toward Sudbury	Sudbury – Toronto	Toronto Terminus
West Toronto toward Owen Sound	Owen Sound – Toronto	Toronto Terminus
Location
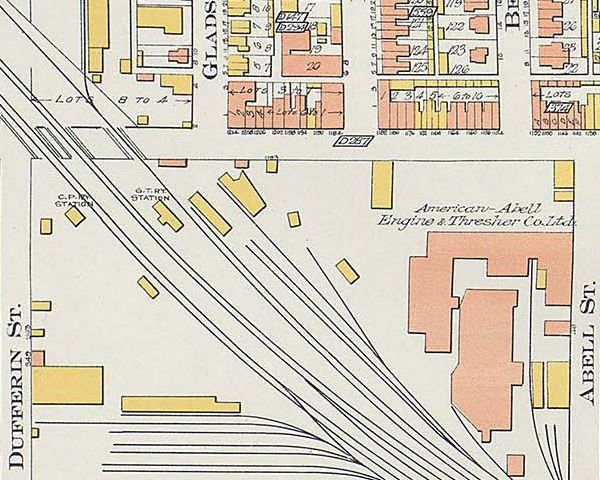

Parkdale railway station, also known as North Parkdale railway station, was a passenger train station in Toronto, Ontario, Canada. The station served the Parkdale village on the then-outskirts of Toronto. The station served trains on the Northern Railway of Canada and Credit Valley Railway, later the Canadian Pacific Railway, railways. It was situated at the intersection of Dufferin Street and Queen Street West. The train station was decommissioned in the 1970s.

== History ==
The first station was built in 1856 by the Ontario Simcoe and Huron Union Railroad Company, which later became the Northern Railway of Canada in 1858. It was a small wooden building situated to the east of the lines, south of Gladstone Avenue and the Gladstone Hotel at Queen Street. In 1885, it was expanded and re-oriented to face the rail lines. The track traversed Dufferin and Queen Streets at an angle, just east of the intersection, at a level crossing from the north-west to the south-east.

In the 1870s, the Grand Trunk Railway built a railway station at Jameson Avenue, on its east-west line. It was named South Parkdale, and the Queen Street station was given the name of North Parkdale station.

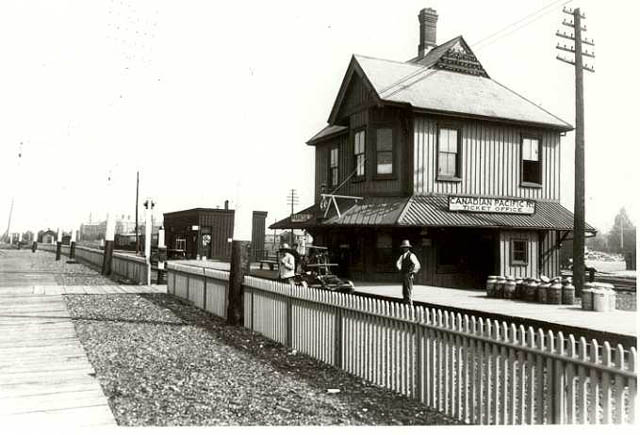
Original CVR station in 1898

A second set of rails parallel and to the west of the earlier lines was installed with the coming of the Credit Valley Railway (CVR). In 1879, a new station building was opened on the west side of the tracks, to the south of Queen Street and east of Dufferin Street. The two stations became a "union station" between the two rail lines. A small rail yard was also constructed south of the location, alongside the rail lines south to King Street, and including a roundhouse, a car shop, a paint shop and a blacksmith shop. In the 1880s, the line was subsumed by the Canadian Pacific Railway (CPR). In 1888, the Northern Railway station became part of the Grand Trunk, which had taken over the Northern Railway.

There were now three sets of rails crossing Queen Street and Dufferin at a level crossing. A plan was soon developed to build a "subway" under the tracks. In the 1890s, an east-west tunnel was built for Queen Street, crossing under the rail lines. Dufferin Street north of Queen Street was closed. This gap in Dufferin Street became known as the "Dufferin jog" as vehicles travelling north-south on Dufferin had to go one block east to Gladstone Avenue via Queen and Peel Streets. In 2010, a north-south tunnel was built to connect the sections of Dufferin Street.

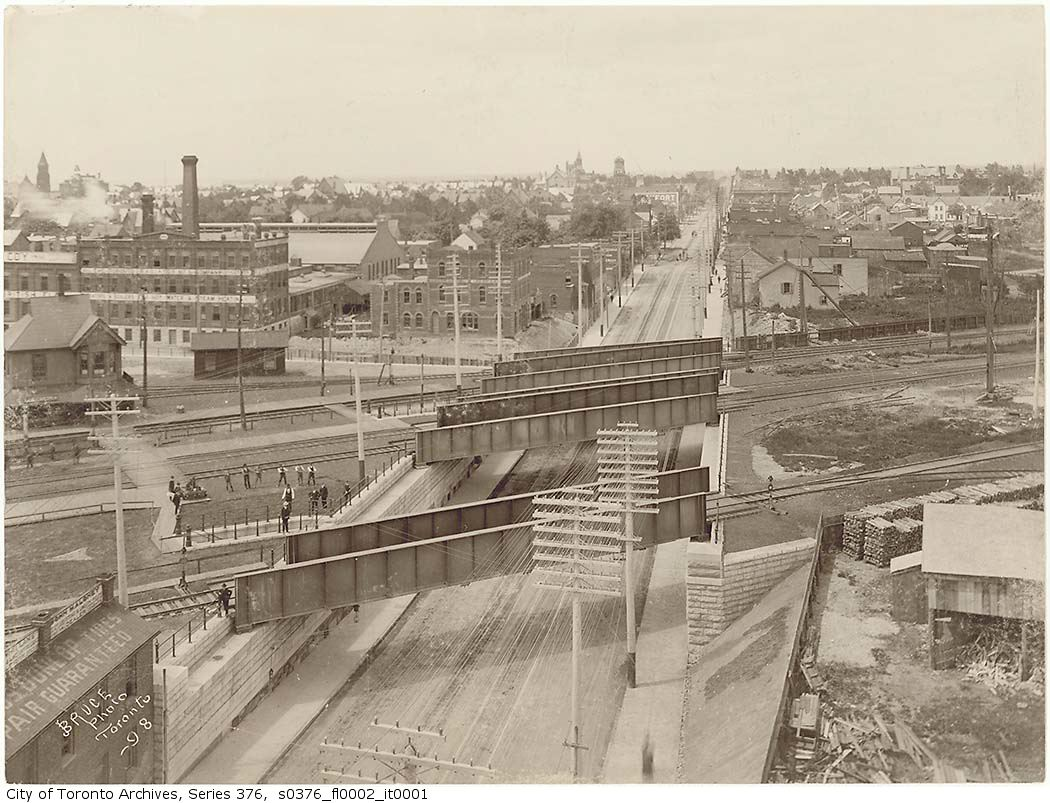
Queen Street looking west in 1899

In the 1910s, the South Parkdale station was closed and replaced with Sunnyside railway station. At the time, a cut was made and the rail lines of the Grand Trunk were moved below street level. The North Parkdale stations were given new signage of "Parkdale", returning to the original name.

In 1958, the station was used by Princess Margaret during a royal tour for a royal train from Parkdale to Stratford, Ontario. On July 31, 1958, Margaret visited Toronto to visit City Hall and dedicate the new Princess Margaret Fountain at Exhibition Place, before going to Parkdale Station.

During the later 19th century and the early 20th century, streetcar lines were extended west of Dufferin Street on King and Queen streets, connecting the area with the central business district. During the 20th century, the Parkdale stations saw a decline in passenger traffic. By the 1970s, the stations were little used for passenger traffic and were closed. Canadian Pacific demolished their train station. The Grand Trunk station, by now part of the Canadian National Railways system, was closed and moved to a location at Queen and Roncesvalles in 1977. It was destroyed by fire later that year.

== Today ==
There are no buildings left on the site. On the original station site, Sudbury Street has been extended north to Queen Street, cutting through the original lands. On the west side, the CPR yard was closed and developed with condominium buildings. The rail lines are still in use, carrying GO Transit and Via Rail passenger traffic and freight traffic. A former staircase up to the station platforms from Queen Street was bricked in, and the arch is still visible.

== See also ==
- Gladstone Hotel - hotel across street from station
