= Walter O'Hara =

British Army officer

Colonel Walter O'Hara (c. 1789 – 13 January 1874) was a member of the British army in the 19th century, participating in battles fighting Napoleon, before immigrating to Toronto, Ontario, Canada, where he participated in the Rebellions of 1837 on the side of the government, defeating the rebels of William Lyon Mackenzie.

In 1850, O'Hara was granted a 400-acre (1.6 km^{2}) property on the western border of Toronto, forming the basis of the Brockton and Parkdale villages.

Today, several streets in Toronto are named after his family, estate or prominence in his life:

- Roncesvalles Avenue – the site of a battle against Napoleon in Spain,
- Sorauren Avenue – another battle site in Spain
- Fermanagh Avenue – the county of his birth in Ireland
- Marion Street – the name of his wife
- Constance Street – the name of his daughter
- West Lodge Avenue – the name of his estate
- Alhambra Avenue – the palace in Granada, Spain
- O'Hara Avenue
