= Battle of Roncesvalles (1813) =

1813 battle during the Peninsular War

- Part of the Battle of the Pyrenees during the Peninsular War
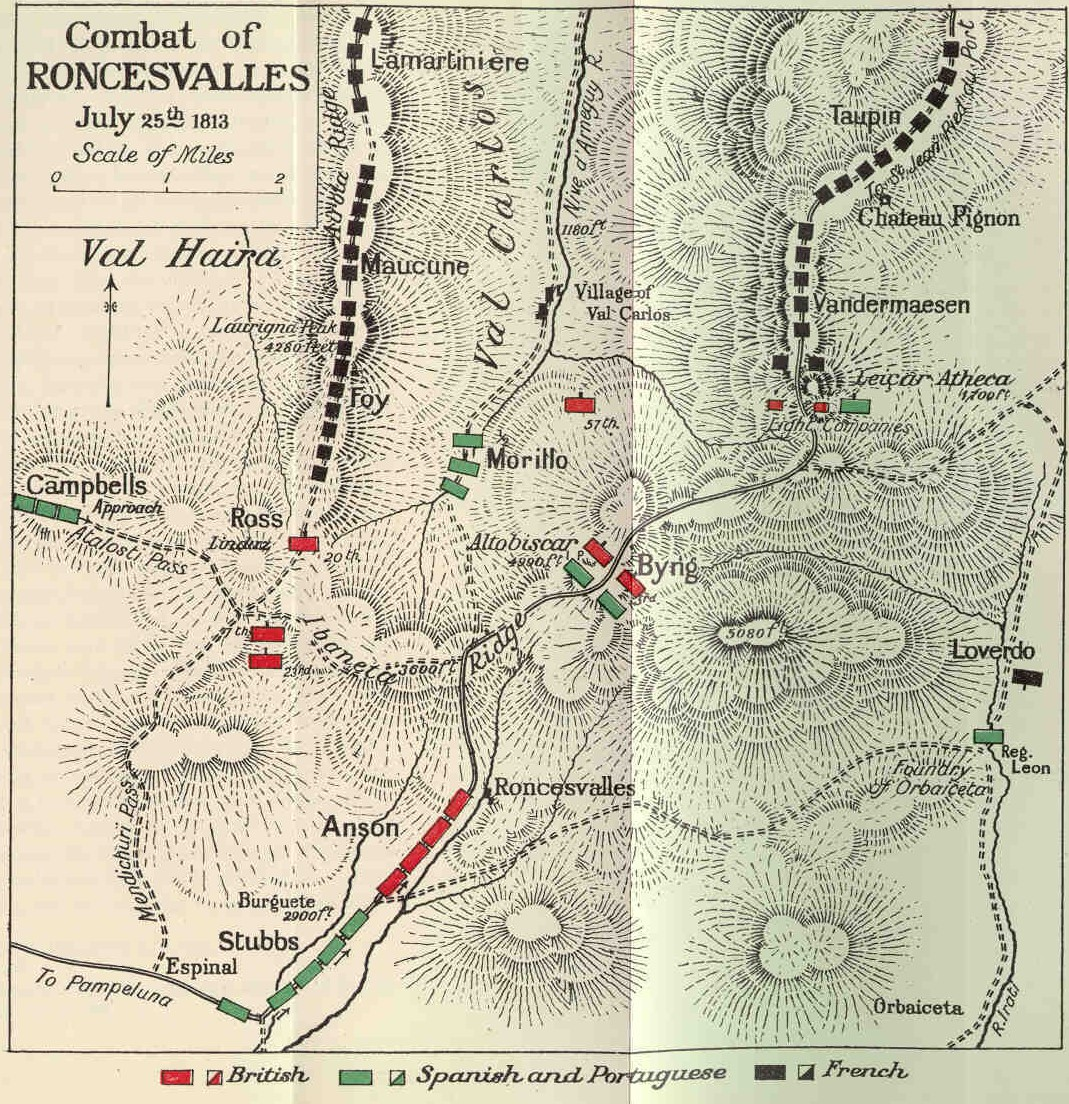
- Image is a map of the Combat of Roncesvalles. It is copied from Sir Charles Oman's "A History of the Peninsular War: Volume VI" which was originally published in 1922. Oman died in 1946.
Date	25 July 1813
Location	Roncevaux Pass, Spain 43°01′13″N 1°19′26″W
Result	French victory

Belligerents
(France) French Empire	United Kingdom; Portugal

Commanders and leaders
(France) General Reille (France) General Clausel	(United Kingdom) Major-General Cole (United Kingdom) Major-General Byng

Strength
40,000 men 25,000 men engaged 8 guns	11,000 men (Note: It is mentioned that there were 19,000 men, but Ross was not among those involved at the Roncevaux.)

Casualties and losses
200–530 dead or wounded	350–450 dead or wounded

Peninsular War
Vitoria and the Pyrenees, 1813–1814

The Battle of Roncesvalles (French: Roncevaux) (25 July 1813) took place at the high Roncevaux Pass between French and Anglo-Portuguese forces during the Peninsular War (1808–1814). The French emerged victorious by assaulting this mountain pass.

== Background ==
After the decisive victory of Allied forces under Arthur Wellesley, 1st Duke of Wellington over French forces under King Joseph Bonaparte at the Battle of Vitoria, Wellington advanced to capture San Sebastián and Pamplona, the last French outposts on Spanish soil.

While Wellington concentrated his efforts on capturing the strategically important port of San Sebastián, he sent 11,000 men under the Irish-Spanish General O'Donnell to blockade Pamplona. To prevent a French counter-attack over the Pyrenees Wellington positioned General Hill's Corps over a 50-mile (80 km) front, to cover the coastal road and the main passes over the mountains.

== Battle ==
Having rapidly rebuilt and reorganised his forces after their defeat, the French under Marshal Nicolas Jean de Dieu Soult launched an attack towards Pamplona through the passes of Maya and Roncesvalles.

The French force at Roncesvalles consisted of 40,000 men and 8 mountain guns under Generals Reille and Clausel. The pass was defended by the British 4th Division commanded by Major-General Galbraith Lowry Cole and was helped by the Portuguese 4/10 brigade.

The French attacked from Saint-Jean-Pied-de-Port advancing in two columns either side of the pass. Clausel on the Altobiscar and Reille on the Linduz. At around 06:00 the two armies met. The British were badly outnumbered, John Byng's brigade on the eastern side held Bertrand Clausel's division at bay for three hours before being forced back.

By 14:00 Cole brought up three more brigades as reinforcements. However, around 17:00 a dense fog descended over the battlefield, just as the Portuguese 4/10 brigade repelled French attacks in the Val de Baigorry. Cole, despite orders to the contrary, ordered his troops to retreat towards Pamplona.

== Aftermath ==
The Allied forces regrouped and made a stand near the village of Sorauren two days later. Later, Wellington admitted that splitting his forces to besiege both San Sebastián and Pamplona simultaneously had been "one of the greatest faults he ever committed in war".

Colonel Walter O'Hara, who had fought in the battle, would name Roncesvalles Avenue in Toronto after the battle. The Roncesvalles, Toronto, neighbourhood in turn gained its name from the street.
