= Jameson Avenue =

Thoroughfare in Toronto, Ontario

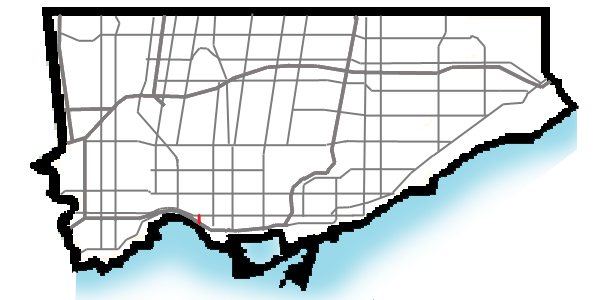
- Jameson Avenue in Toronto
- Maintained by: City of Toronto government
- Length: 0.9 km (0.56 mi)
- South end: Lake Shore Boulevard
- Major junctions: King Street
- North end: Queen Street

Other
Nearby arterial roads in Toronto
← Roncessvales Avenue	Dufferin Street →

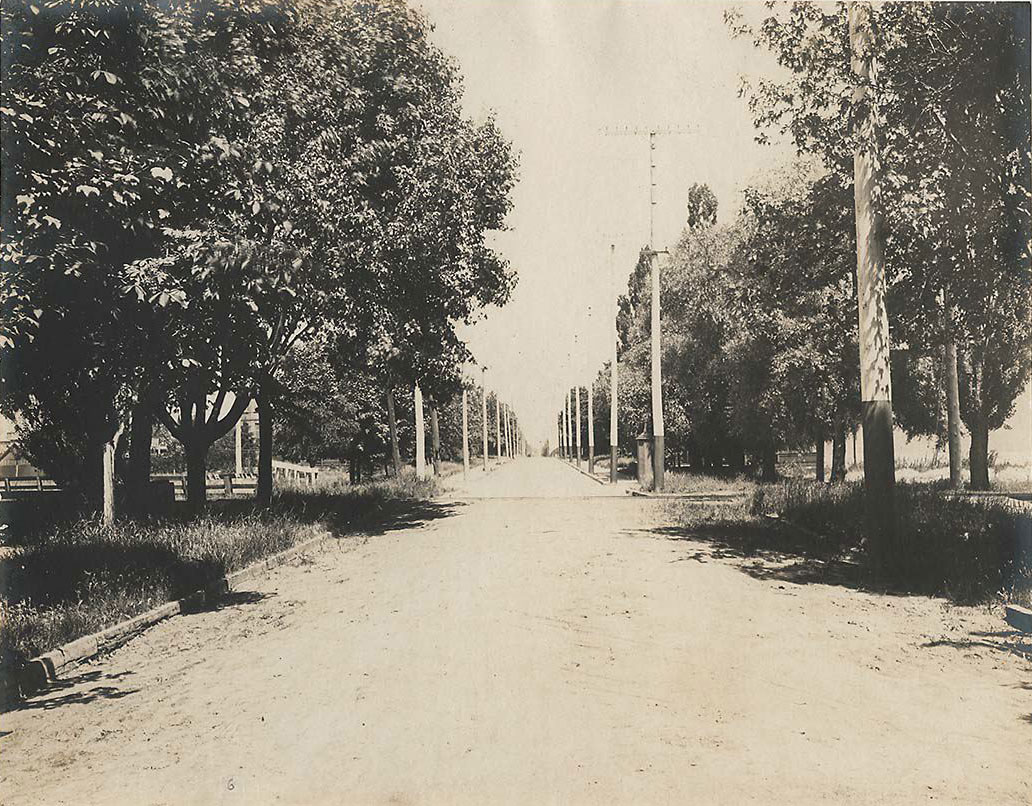
Jameson Avenue in 1899, looking north from just south of Springhurst

Jameson Avenue is a multi-lane arterial road in the Parkdale neighbourhood in Toronto, Ontario, Canada. It is a north–south roadway from Lake Shore Boulevard to Queen Street. Originally laid out in the 19th century as a two-lane residential street, its traffic and land use has changed considerably from a suburban/semi-rural street to a main arterial connecting to an expressway.

The road is named for Robert Sympson Jameson, former Attorney General of Upper Canada.

== History ==
Jameson Avenue was built in the 1880s as part of the then Village of Parkdale's development, connecting Queen Street to the Lake Ontario waterfront. Parkdale Collegiate Institute, built in 1888 near Queen Street, was one of the first structures to rise alongside the street. Near the foot of the street at Springhurst Avenue and Jameson, the South Parkdale railway station was built in 1879, on the Grand Trunk Railway (GTR).

After the 1889 annexation of Parkdale into the City of Toronto, the pace of development increased around Jameson Avenue. The street became lined with single-family dwellings, many of them quite large, along the full length of the street down to the waterfront. Several still exist today.

The first change in the character of the street came in the 1910s, when the GTR lowered the level of the railway tracks to below that of Jameson, and closed the railway station, replacing it with Sunnyside station to the west.

As the City of Toronto grew, and with the development of suburbs to the west, east–west automobile traffic in the area increased. The completion of the Queen Elizabeth Way (QEW) in 1940 meant that Lake Shore Road, and by extension Parkdale, became a major connecting path between downtown Toronto and the highway. King and Queen Streets started to carry large amounts of commuter traffic.

When the Municipality of Metropolitan Toronto was created in 1953, one of the first projects proposed was a connector highway between the QEW and downtown. This became the Gardiner Expressway. The Gardiner Expressway's right-of-way was laid out just south of the existing GTR rail lines, at the same level. This right-of-way meant the demolition of over 50 homes at the foot of Jameson. An interchange with the expressway at Jameson was also created, which eliminated pedestrian access to the waterfront from the neighbourhood, necessitating a pedestrian bridge. The section of Jameson leading to the lakeshore was removed. The street was not renumbered and the lowest numerical address on the street is 79.

The building of the highway changed the street from a residential neighbourhood street to an arterial roadway. The land use changed considerably after that, changing from single-family dwellings to the multi-storey apartment buildings that line Jameson on both sides from Springhurst to Queen Street today.

Recently, plans have been made to revamp the area of the demolished neighbourhood, moving the eastbound Lake Shore Boulevard to north of the Gardiner, freeing up space for park uses and enhancing access to the waterfront. As of July 2009, the project still requires approval and funding from Toronto City Council.
