= West Toronto Diamond =

Railway station in Toronto, Ontario, Canada

Coordinates: 43°40′02″N 79°27′36″W

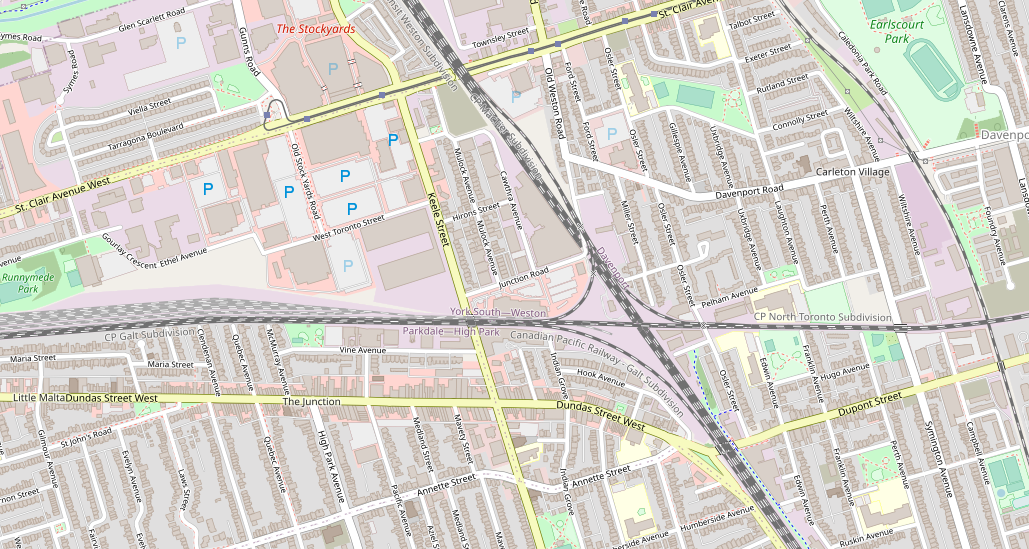
Map of the diamond.

The West Toronto Diamond is a railway junction in Toronto, Ontario, Canada. It connects the Metrolinx Weston Subdivision, which carries the GO Transit Kitchener line, UP Express and Via Rail Corridor passenger services, to the CPKC North Toronto Subdivision, which is the Canadian Pacific Kansas City's main freight line across Toronto. It is located near the intersection of Keele Street and Dundas Street in Toronto.

The West Toronto Diamond is often referred to as "the junction" and gives Toronto's The Junction neighbourhood its name.

== History ==
The junction was originally controlled by a complex interlocking built by Saxby and Farmer which controlled 21 switches, derails and locks, plus 17 signals. The interlocking was controlled from an interlocking tower located at the centre of the junction. In 1965 the interlocking was converted from local control to remote control, operated by the CP Toronto Terminals Dispatcher in Toronto Union Station.

=== Grade separation ===
In April 2008, Metrolinx bought the Weston Sub from CN Rail to allow them to expand the railway to support increased train service along the corridor.

The junction was grade separated to move the Metrolinx Weston subdivision into a trench, passing underneath the CP North Toronto subdivision. The project was designed to accommodate a widened Weston subdivision, increasing from 2 tracks to 4. The new underpass began operation on May 26, 2014.

The cost to do this separation is close to $500 million, but will be paid back in full in a matter of years as more trains are added to all lines.

== Passenger stations ==
=== Canadian National ===
The Grand Trunk Railway (GTR) built a station north of the diamond in 1907, named Carlton & Weston Road. It was located on the east side of the GTR tracks at Old Weston Road and Junction Road, and served by trains on the route to London via Guelph and Kitchener. The station passed to Canadian National (CN) in 1923, and closed in 1988.

Preceding station	Canadian National Railway	Following station
Weston toward Sarnia	Sarnia – Toronto via Lucan Crossing	Parkdale toward Toronto

=== Canadian Pacific ===
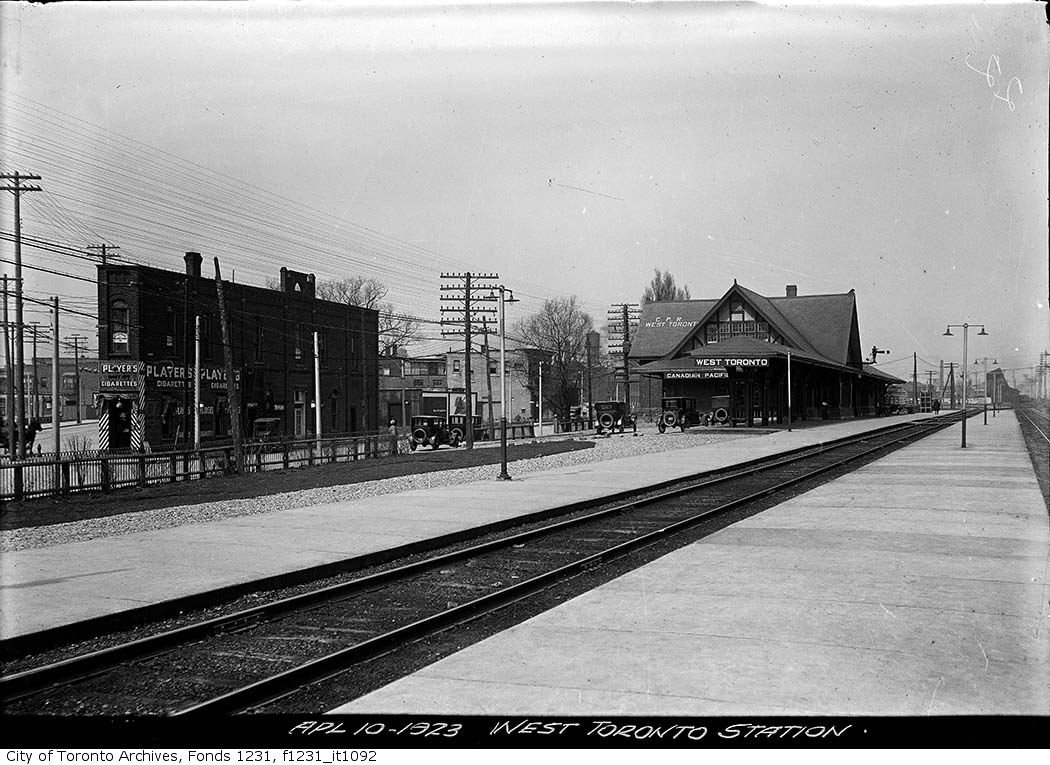
CP's West Toronto station in 1923. This picture is facing north-west, and was taken close to where Dupont Street now passes under the tracks.

Canadian Pacific (CP)'s West Toronto station was a more notable structure, on the southwest side of the diamond.

The first CP station was built in 1885, immediately west of the Weston Road bridge. It was replaced by another structure on the east side of the bridge in 1898. In turn, this was replaced in 1911 when a larger station was built further south near Old Weston Road and Dupont Street.

The station was closed when its last remaining train service, The Canadian to Vancouver, was rerouted in 1978. Heritage interests had been talking to politicians about having it preserved when CP abruptly demolished the building on November 25, 1982. It was one of a series of demolitions of closed stations they had carried out about that time, at least once using similar tactics. After the demolition the company rebuilt the junction curves used by the new Milton line GO trains on a gentler alignment. The company claimed that this had been urgently necessary, that they had "tried" to give notice, that as a federally regulated company they did not need municipal permission, and that since the building was already closed it was no longer a station and so they did not need federal permission either. However, the Canadian Transport Commission ruled on May 3, 1983, that the demolition was illegal.

Preceding station	Canadian Pacific Railway	Following station
Islington toward Detroit	Detroit – Montreal	Parkdale toward Montreal Windsor
Islington toward Detroit	Detroit – Montreal	North Toronto toward Montreal Windsor
Weston toward Sudbury	Sudbury – Toronto	Parkdale toward Toronto
Streetsville toward Owen Sound	Owen Sound – Toronto	Parkdale toward Toronto
