= Parkdale Avenue =

Parkdale Avenue may refer to:

- Parkdale Avenue (Hamilton, Ontario), Canada, a road in Hamilton, Ontario
- Parkdale Avenue (Ottawa), Ontario, Canada

== See also ==
- Parkdale (disambiguation)
