= Parkdale, Toronto =

Parkdale
- Neighbourhood
- Queen Street West in Parkdale in 2026

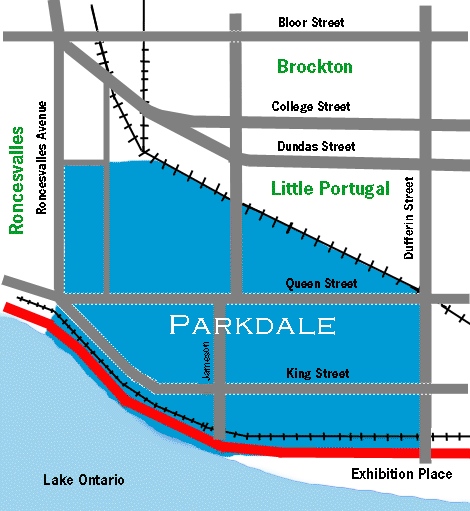
- Parkdale neighbourhood

- Location within Toronto
- Coordinates: 43.640°N 79.437°W
- Country: Canada
- Province: Ontario
- City: Toronto
- Established: 1874 Subdivided
- Incorporated: 1879 (Village)
- Annexed: 1889 into City of Toronto

Government
  - City Councillor: Gord Perks
  - M.P.: Karim Bardeesy (Liberal)
  - M.P.P.: Alexa Gilmour (NDP)

Parkdale is a neighbourhood and former village in Toronto, Ontario, Canada, west of downtown. The neighbourhood is bounded on the west by Roncesvalles Avenue; on the north by the CP Rail line where it crosses Queen Street and Dundas Street; on the east by Dufferin Street from Queen Street south; and on the south by Lake Ontario. The original village incorporated an area north of Queen Street, east of Roncesvalles from Fermanagh east to the main rail lines, today known as part of the Roncesvalles neighbourhood. The village area was roughly one square kilometre in area. The City of Toronto government extends the neighbourhood boundaries to the east, south of the CP Rail lines, east to Atlantic Avenue, as far south as the CN Rail lines north of Exhibition Place, the part south of King Street commonly known as the western half of Liberty Village neighbourhood.

Parkdale was founded as an independent settlement within York County in the 1850s. It was incorporated as a village in 1879 and amalgamated with Toronto in 1889. It was an upper-income residential area for the first half of the 20th century, with several notable mansions. The area changed dramatically with the building of the Gardiner Expressway in 1955, which resulted in the demolition of the southern section of the neighbourhood and the Sunnyside Amusement Park, and the creation of a barrier between the neighbourhood and the north shore of Lake Ontario. A boom in apartment building construction followed, replacing whole blocks of homes with blocks of apartment buildings. Some of the older large residential buildings remain though many were converted into rooming houses. The demographic composition changed considerably, including a higher proportion of lower income and newcomer families. Today, it is a working-class neighbourhood, with a large percentage of low-income households concentrated in South Parkdale, and an entry point for new immigrants, most recently South Asians and Tibetan. The visible minority population in North Parkdale has changed overall to include fewer Asian, South Asian and Black residents between the census years 2006–2011 (GNR: 34%).

The area has a vibrant storefront commercial strip along Queen Street West that has seen an increase in restaurants and bars in the 2010s, increasing to the point that planning controls were put in place on the opening of new restaurants and bars from 2012.

== Character ==
Parkdale is primarily a residential area of the city, with semi-detached and detached homes predominating on most side streets. Many of the homes date from the 19th Century and early 20th Century. Around 1900, the area was a well-to-do suburb and many older mansions from around 1900 still exist, often converted to multi-unit buildings. Many of the residential streets have mature trees. Good examples of Victorian housing can still be found on Cowan Avenue and Dunn Avenue, south of King Street. Victorian-era row homes of Georgian Revival style with original gaslights can also be seen on Melbourne Place.

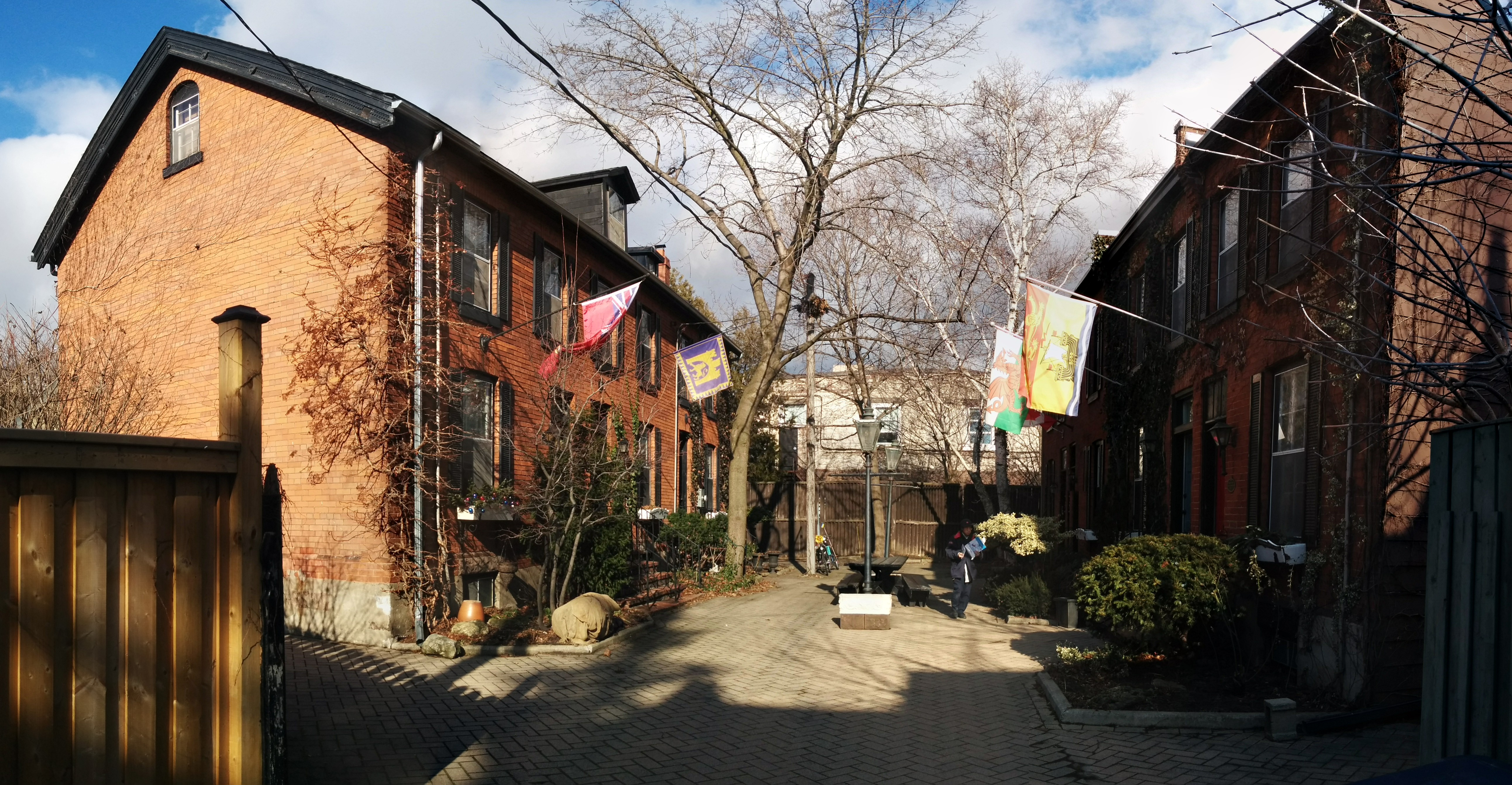
Victorian-era row homes are found at Melbourne Place in Parkdale.

Parkdale has a higher-than-average proportion of rental housing. Several streets, notably Jameson Avenue and Tyndall Avenue have been converted to zones of apartment buildings. The apartment buildings mostly date from the 1950s through the 1970s, and have remained rental buildings while no large condominium projects have been built west of Dufferin Street.

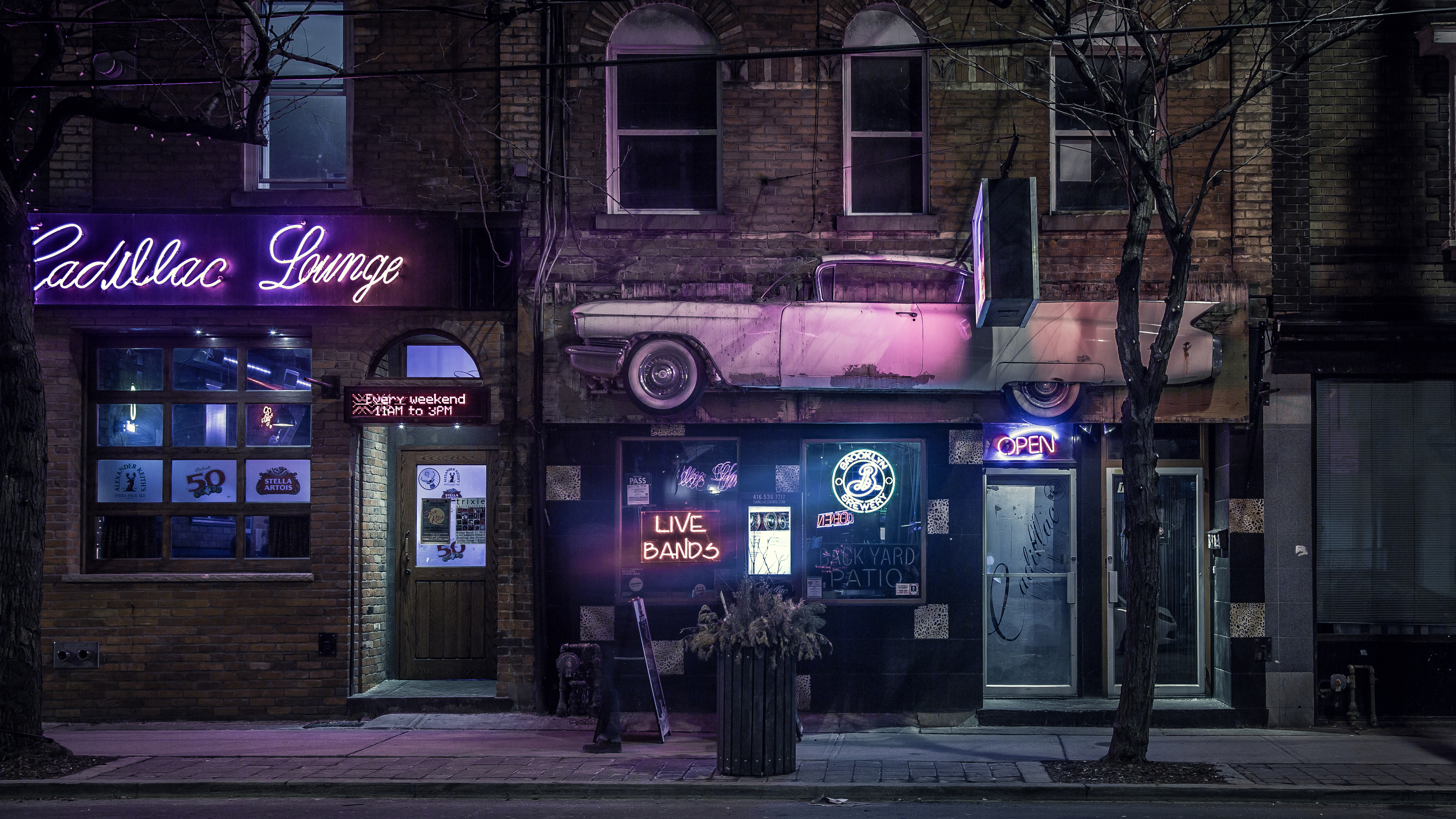
Parkdale's commercial districts are located on King Street and Queen Street West.

Parkdale's commercial districts are along Queen Street West from Roncesvalles in the west to Dufferin Avenue in the east, and King Street West around Dufferin Street. Queen Street West has a large proportion of restaurants and bars, as well as local shops and art galleries. Commercial space is mostly storefronts oriented toward local customers.

The area has a lower amount of park land per resident compared to other parts of Toronto. Several streets have parkettes (small parks) built since the 1960s in an initiative to increase the amount of park land in the area.

Demographically, Parkdale is mixed in income and ethnicity. The neighbourhood has an above average percentage of renters and that number has increased since 2006 to 2011. The area contains some of the lowest-income persons in the city. Between 2006 and 2011, there was a decrease in the median income of Parkdale by 2.9%. However, in 2011, there was an increase in the number of people earning within the range of $30,000 to $60,000. The large amount of rental stock is an entry point for immigrants to Toronto. The area has a significant group of musicians and visual artists, who often perform and exhibit locally.

To the south of Parkdale, the area is bordered by transportation uses, including the railway, Gardiner Expressway and Lake Shore Boulevard. South of the transportation corridor, the shoreline is mostly park land, with recreational clubs such as the Argonaut Rowing Club and Boulevard Club (formerly the Parkdale Canoe Club) on the water.

== History ==
The Village of Parkdale was founded in 1879, but settlement of the area predated its foundation. In 1812, the 240 acres (97 ha) of land bounded from Lot Street (today's Queen Street) on the north, and Jameson on the west and Dufferin Avenue was granted to James Brock, the cousin of Sir Isaac Brock, in lieu of salary. Brock did not occupy or improve the land during his lifetime. After Brock's death in 1830, his widow Lucy Brock sold the lands which became the major part of Parkdale to John Henry Dunn and William Gwynne. The area north of Queen Street was subdivided from the O'Hara Estate, given to Walter O'Hara for military service. Another parcel of land north of Queen was given to James Brock, east of the O'Hara estate, was developed along Brock Avenue and became Brockton Village.

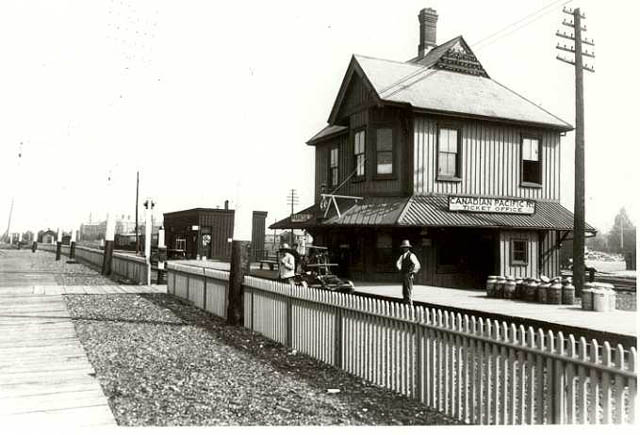
Parkdale railway station in 1898. The railway station opened in 1856.

The Parkdale railway station was opened at Queen and Dufferin streets in 1856. In the 1870s, the Grand Trunk Railway built a railway station at Jameson Avenue, on its east–west line. It was named South Parkdale, and the Queen Street station was given the name of North Parkdale station.

A census of residents prior to the founding showed 783 residents of the area, more than enough for the legal requirement of 750 at the time. A local legend is that Romani people (then called Gypsies) were signed up as local residents to provide enough numbers. Parkdale's status as an independent village was controversial at the time and was opposed by the City of Toronto and the York County councils.

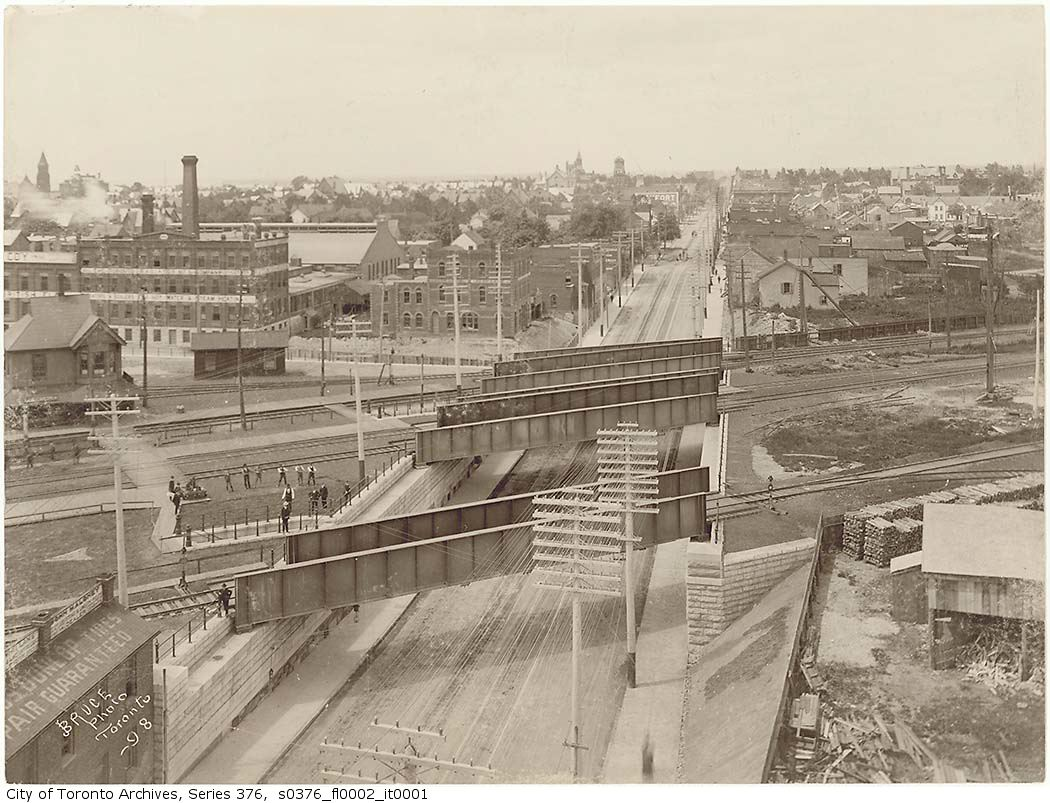
View of Parkdale in 1898. Parkdale was annexed by the City of Toronto a decade earlier, in 1888.

It was purely a residential suburb, home to large Victorian mansions and views of Lake Ontario. The first house of worship in Parkdale, the Anglican Church of St. Mark, was completed on January 20, 1881, on Cowan Ave just south of Queen Street. Later that year, Parkdale's population was recorded as 1,170 in the 1881 Census of Canada. In 1884, the Village council passed a bylaw to join Toronto, to be annexed by the City of Toronto, as the village was in fact surrounded by the city of Toronto. The act did not take place immediately as the Village's finances were not in order. Liabilities of the village were not clearly stated in the village's financial statements. On October 27, 1888, another vote was held and the annexation was upheld. The village was annexed by the City of Toronto in March 1889. It became "St. Alban's Ward.".

In the 1910s, the South Parkdale station was closed and replaced with Sunnyside railway station. At the time, a cut was made between Dowling and Atlantic streets and the rail lines of the Grand Trunk were moved below street level. The North Parkdale stations were given new signage of "Parkdale", returning to the original name.

=== 'Sunnyside years' ===
Throughout the first half of the 20th century, Parkdale's desirability stemmed from its proximity to the lake, the Canadian National Exhibition to the south-east and the popular Sunnyside Beach at the foot of Roncesvalles to the west. From 1911 to 1922, the Toronto Harbour Commission improved the lakefront extending the shoreline from the rail line 100 metres (330 ft) south, with a breakwater and boardwalk. As an example, in 1905, the Parkdale Canoe Club (known today as the Boulevard Club) opened. When built, it was on a pier extending out into the lake. As part of the infill project, it became situated inland. To the east of the current building were baseball and lacrosse fields. It was the site of a popular women's softball league for many years.

Sunnyside Amusement Park was opened in 1922, providing a popular day vacation for Torontonians. Movie theatres were opened, such as the Brighton on Roncesvalles and the Odeon on Queen Street to the east of Roncesvalles. Hotels like the Edgewater at Queen and Roncesvalles were established.

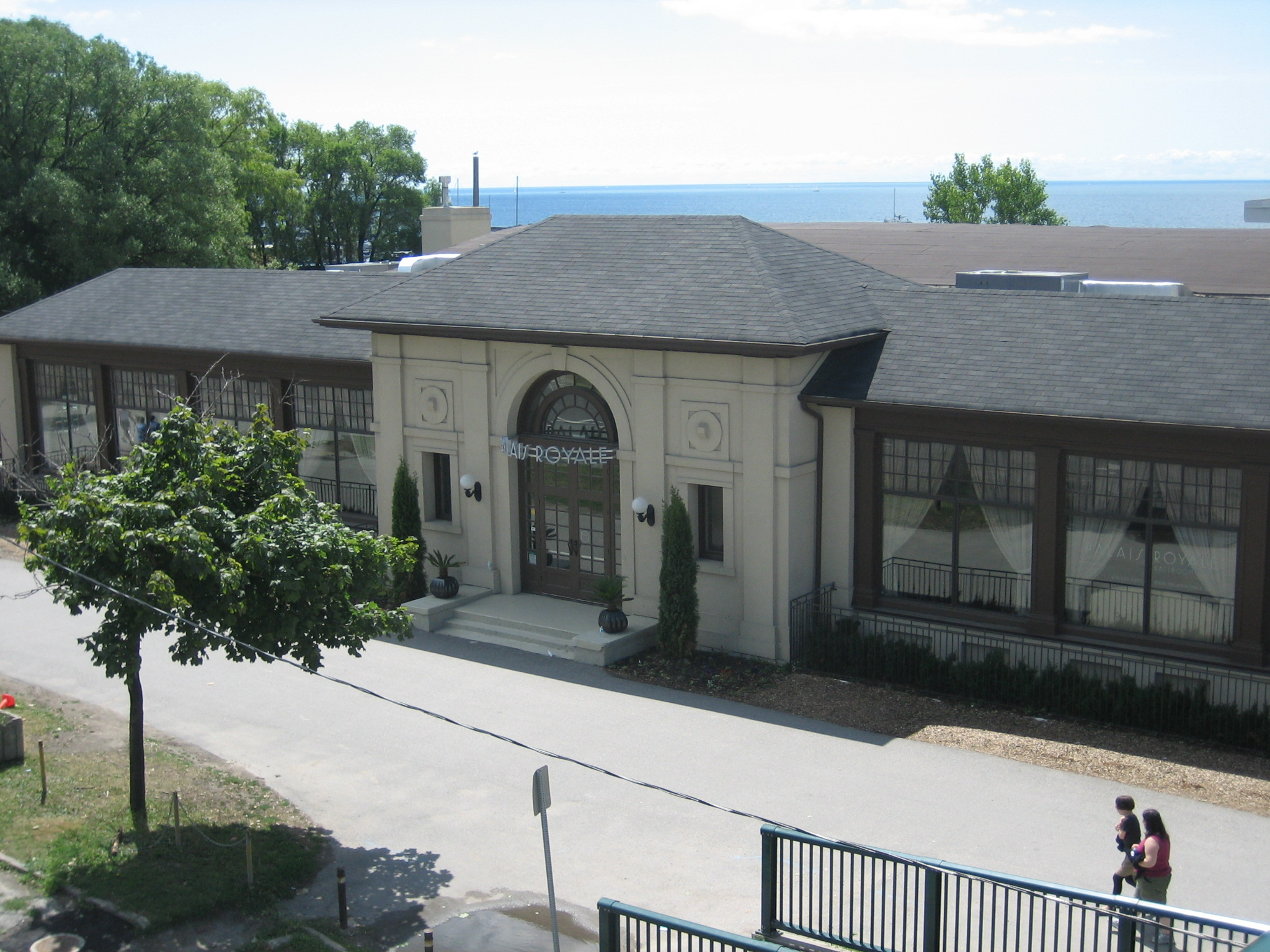
Opened in 1922, Palais Royale is located along Lake Shore Boulevard. The facility is situated near the edge of Sunnyside Beach.

The Palais Royale at the eastern edge of Sunnyside Beach opened in 1922 as a canoe factory and dance hall. Many important big bands played there in the 1930s and the 1940s, and this attracted a large youth patronage. Many war-generation Torontonians courted their future partners in this building. The Palais Royale operates today as a special occasion hall and is a favourite venue for bands, including The Rolling Stones, who played a 2002 concert there, and has been the location for live recordings by Sloan and Downchild Blues Band.

=== 1950s–1970s: Gardiner Expressway and Southern section of Parkdale demolition ===
In 1955, the city began work on the Gardiner Expressway, a limited access highway alongside the railway cut. The Sunnyside Amusement Park was demolished, except for the Bathing Pavilion and the Palais Royale hall. The southern section of Parkdale to the west of Dufferin, south of the railway was also demolished. Parkdale was now separated from Lake Ontario and Sunnyside Beach and the expressway effectively halved the amount of usable lakeside parkland. A reorganization of the area's residential streets was also done. Patronage of the beach declined rapidly. Both the Parkdale and Sunnyside train stations closed during the 1970s.

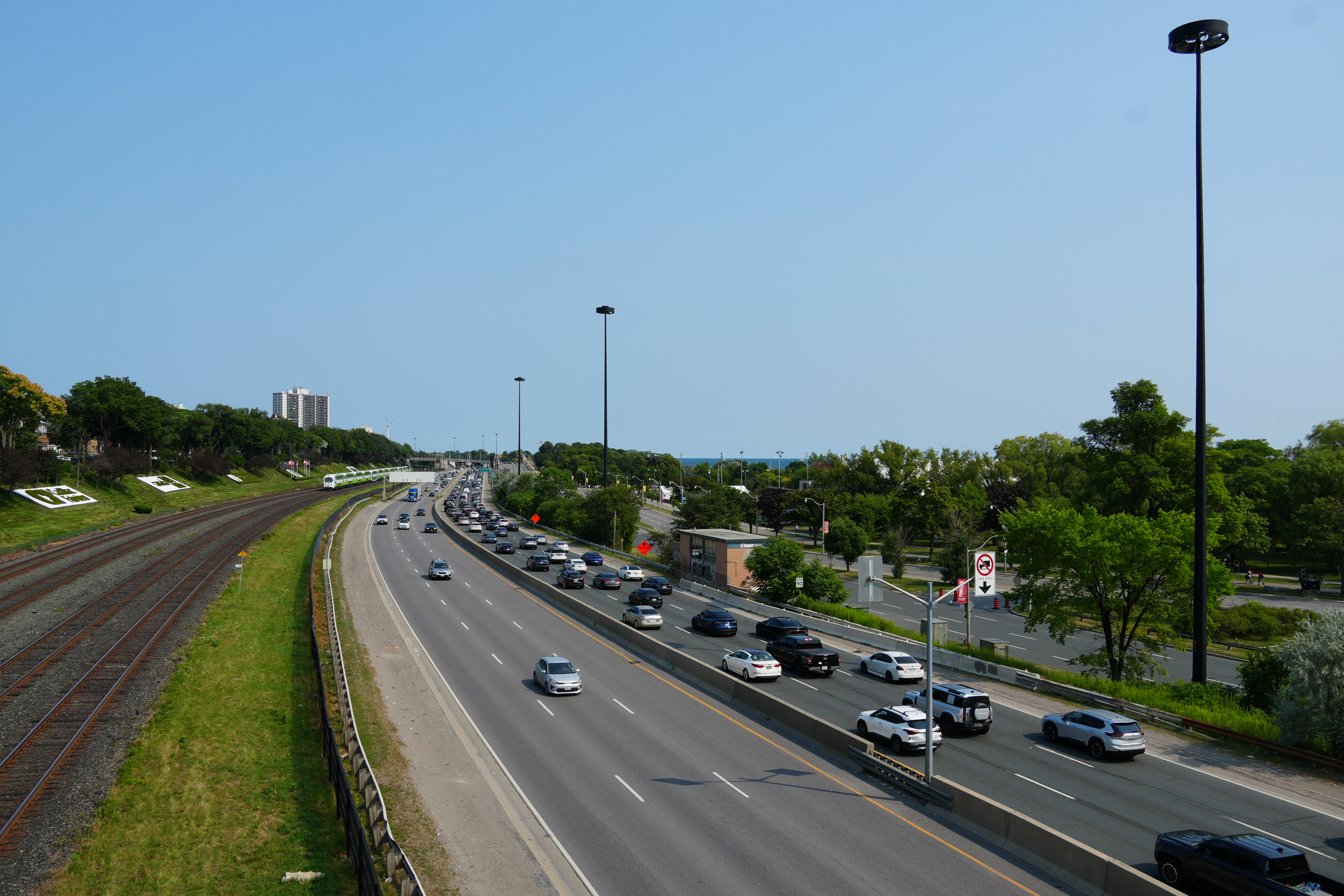
The Gardiner Expressway is a controlled-access highway that runs east–west through Parkdale. The neighbourhood changed greatly with the completion of the highway.

The neighbourhood changed greatly after the highway was completed and the park closed. Population density increased with the building of numerous apartment buildings. Jameson Avenue, which became the conduit to the highway changed from single family homes to a street of apartment buildings, many cheaply built. Nearby, many of the mansions and large houses became makeshift low-rise 'bachelorette' apartment buildings and rooming houses. Several had operated as tourist hotels for visitors to Sunnyside and the CNE. Industrial activity declined along the railways. One former industrial site on West Lodge Avenue became a two-tower apartment complex that has repeatedly been cited by the city for various by-law infractions. Businesses suffered during the transition, with leisure-type businesses compatible with the Park, such as the Brighton and Odeon theatres closing. Along Queen Street, which saw traffic decline substantially, many businesses closed or changed hands.

=== 1970s: Absorption of out-patients ===
In the mid-1970s, the Government of Ontario decided to release many long-term care mental illness patients from its Queen Street and Lakeshore Psychiatric Hospital facilities to integrate them into the community. Many of the remaining mansions of South Parkdale had already been converted to boarding houses, and were only a short distance away from the Queen Street hospital. Many illegal 'bachelorette' units were also being created and the inexpensive rental stock of South Parkdale soon became home to many of the released patients. The area developed a reputation as a neighbourhood rife with poverty, crime, drugs, homelessness, and large numbers of people living with mental illness.

In 1977, the Parkdale Activity-Recreation Centre (PARC) was founded to operate a drop-in centre in Parkdale for survivors of mental health ailments, the homeless, the disabled and those with few resources. Community volunteers observed that there were a large number of adults living in rooming houses and boarding homes throughout the Parkdale community after local mental health facilities began to de-institutionalize psychiatric patients. Most of these adults possessed little income, had few or no family contacts, did not have a place to go during the day and had been ostracized. In 1980 PARC found funding, staff and a venue and opened its doors to provide support, meals, employment opportunities and various programs to people with serious mental health and addiction issues.

The Parkdale Village Business Improvement Area (BIA) was established in 1978, and represents the commercial strip on Queen Street West from Dufferin Street to Roncesvalles Avenue. The BIA has highlighted the uniqueness of this commercial district, including its restaurants, antique stores, cafés and shops.

=== Recent ===
Owing to the many affordable rental apartments and its proximity to the downtown core, Parkdale has evolved into a transient neighbourhood for many newcomers to Canada. Waves of Caribbean, Indian, Vietnamese, Filipino, Tamil, Chinese, Tibetan, Hungarian and Roma immigrants have marked Parkdale in different times between 1980 till present. Parkdale has, since the late 1990s, hosted a large number of Tibetan settlers, with the area known as Little Tibet becoming home to one of the largest Tibetan diaspora outside of India and Nepal. Parkdale has a number of settlement and immigration agencies that deal with the needs of the newcomers and provide them with the necessary support as they explore the opportunities provided in Canada. Some of the agencies are Parkdale Community Information Centre (PCIC), Parkdale Community Legal Services, PIA, and Culture Link. Parkdale is a mixed income neighbourhood,

Some of the recent developments in Parkdale include the Healthy Organic Parkdale Edibles (HOPE) garden in the Masaryk Park, south of Queen and on the west side of Cowan Avenue. This community garden was founded by Shannon Thompson of Greenest City, along with many community members to allow residents who don't have growing space to grow food and build a more inclusive community area. The environmental and community organization based in Parkdale since 2006 works with food sovereignty, youth employment, environmental awareness and community building. Greenest City has also initiated the Youth Garden in Dunn Parkette. The volunteers of the two gardens also host festivals, workshops, field trips along with other activities and projects in the area.

The area has seen an influx of artists working in the relatively inexpensive spaces, close to the exhibit spaces on Queen Street within Parkdale and along Queen Street to the east. The opening of the Parkdale Arts and Cultural Centre, along with efforts to promote businesses in the area, such as the Parkdale-Liberty Economic Development Centre, has spurred the growth of a vibrant creative area along Queen Street, which puts on a large display during Toronto's annual 'Nuit Blanche.'

The housing stock has seen some gentrification, especially in the area north of Queen Street identified with the "Roncesvalles Village" area, again due to the relatively inexpensive property values. In recent years housing prices in Parkdale have caught up with much of the rest of Toronto. Still, sub-standard housing in the units within the older buildings remains a concern of local city councillors and local community members. Numerous conversions into bachelorettes were done illegally and conditions did not conform to building or fire codes. An initiative, known as the "Parkdale Pilot Project" was formed to address the illegal conversions, seeking to bring the buildings into line. One location on King Street was the location of the 'Pope Squat' where Ontario Coalition Against Poverty activists squatted in a vacant apartment building during a visit of Pope John Paul II. After being vacant for over ten years (most of which it was owned by the Government of Ontario), the building eventually re-opened as apartments, after its redevelopment was approved by the Pilot Project's housing committee. An apartment building on the corner of Queen Street and Dowling Avenue also lay vacant for some time before being expropriated by the city for an affordable housing re-development. It is known as Edmond Place and is a partnership of the city with PARC.

The commercial uses along Queen Street West have seen changes. In 2013, a sudden proliferation of restaurants and bars in one area led to a bylaw limiting the number to 25% of establishments. The bylaw was rescinded in 2018, with a continuing prohibition on backyard and rooftop patios. In 2018, several vegan businesses owned by a single owner "The 5700" opened, between Dufferin and Brock Street. The company attempted to market the area as "Vegandale", dropping the idea after community protest against gentrification and a conflict with the Parkdale Village BIA. Two of the businesses closed in 2020. An increase in the number of residents of Tibetan origin has led to the opening of Tibetan businesses and restaurants informally known as "Little Tibet".

== Education ==
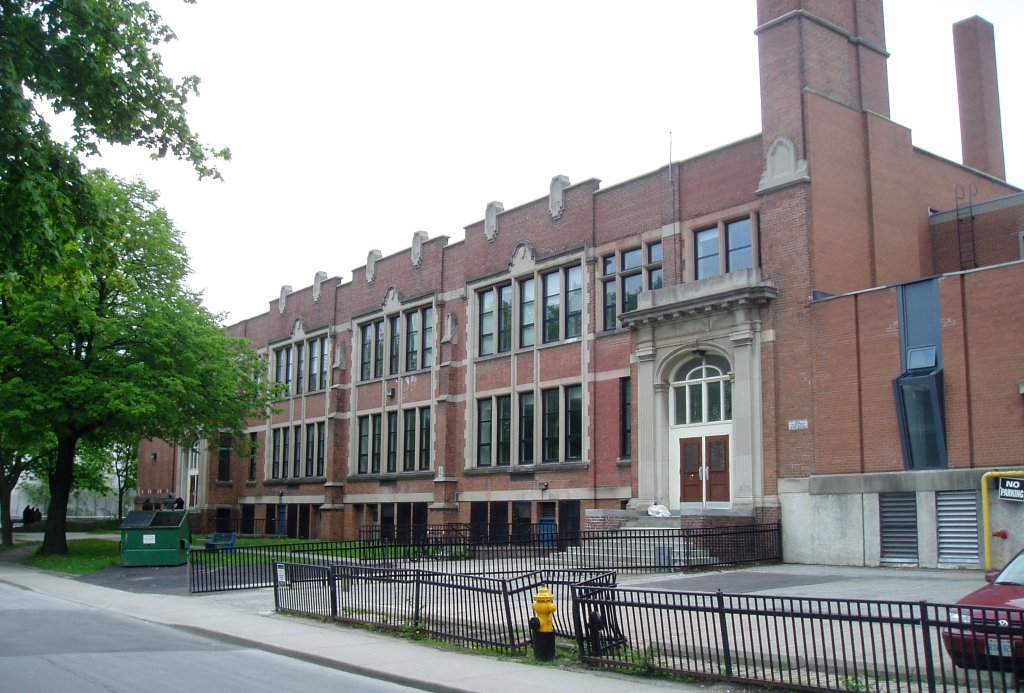
Parkdale Collegiate Institute is a public secondary school operated by the Toronto District School Board.

There are four Toronto-based school boards that provides public education for the city, including the neighbourhood of Parkdale. Two of the four Toronto-based school boards are English first language public school boards, the secular Toronto District School Board (TDSB), and the separate Toronto Catholic District School Board (TCDSB). The institutions operated by the other two Toronto-based school boards, the secular Conseil scolaire Viamonde, and separate Conseil scolaire catholique MonAvenir, are French first language public school boards. However, neither French-language school board operates a school in Parkdale.

The following elementary and secondary schools are located in Parkdale:

- Parkdale Collegiate Institute, a TDSB secondary school on Jameson Avenue south of Queen Street. It was founded in the 1880s.
- Dr. Rita Cox – Kina Minogok Public School, is a TDSB elementary school on Close Avenue at King Street. Founded in 1887, it was previously known as Queen Victoria Public School. In 2022, it was renamed after Rita Cox, an influential head of the Parkdale branch of Toronto Public Library, and an Indigenous phrase.
- Parkdale Public School is a TDSB elementary school which includes preschool to grade 8. It is on Seaforth avenue.
- Holy Family Catholic School, a TCDSB elementary school, a part of Holy Family Parish on Close Avenue. Founded in 1900, two years before the parish church and present school opened at their current location, Holy Family School was created out of Toronto's original west end parish and school of St. Helen's and was first in Parkdale's Masonic Hall on the south side of Queen Street near Dowling Ave. The school was served for many years by the Sisters of Loreto who commuted from their convent in Toronto's downtown. As population increased in the Parkdale area, the school was enlarged many times such that the standing remains of the original building are now obscured. In 2004 a community centre opened in the school newly built additional building, also at that time, Toronto's archbishop invited fathers of the Oratory of Saint Philip Neri in Montreal to come to Toronto to serve Holy Family Church and school. When the original Holy Family Church burned in 1997, the congregation worshipped in the school while funds were raised to build a new church.

== Transportation ==
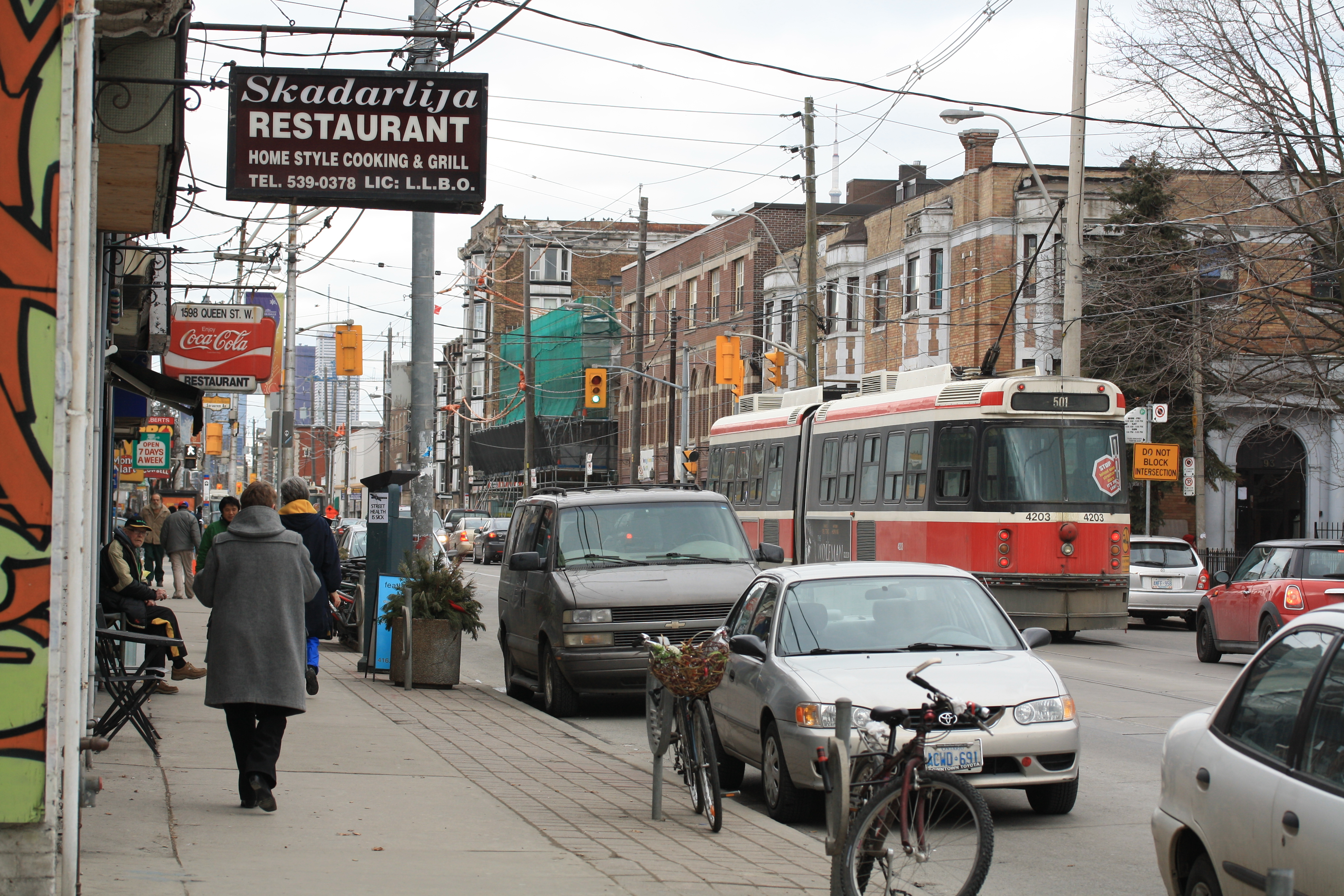
The 501 Queen streetcar in Parkdale, one of several public transportation services operated by the TTC

There are several routes serving Parkdale. Along Queen and King Streets, streetcars provide service. Along Lansdowne Avenue and Dufferin Street, bus service is provided, connecting to the Bloor-Danforth subway to the north. The 504 King streetcar route along King Street connects to Dundas West station via Roncesvalles Avenue.

=== Main streets ===
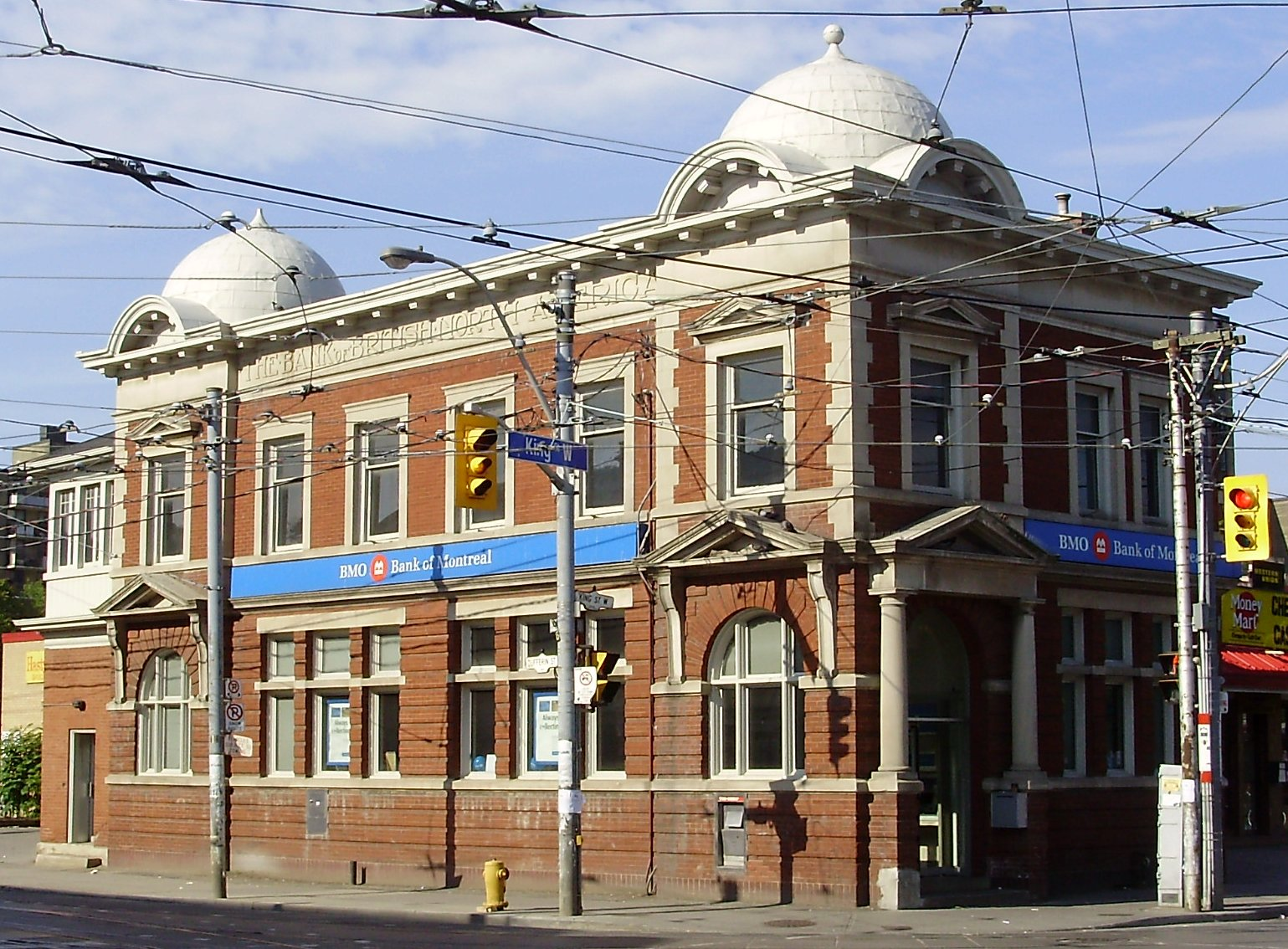
A former Bank of British North America branch on King Street, a major road in the neighbourhood

Queen Street West running east–west is the primary commercial street of the neighbourhood. It is four lanes and the buildings are predominantly 2–3 storey buildings, often with apartments on the upper floors. It ends at Roncesvalles, meeting King Street and the Queensway at the 'Sunnyside' intersection. It continues to the east to downtown. The business along Queen have formed a Business Improvement Association under the name of "Parkdale Village." The street has numerous art galleries, restaurants, cafes and convenience stores. The Parkdale branch of the Toronto Public Library is at Cowan Avenue.

King Street West, running east–west is a major street continuing to the east to Toronto's downtown, ending to the west at Sunnyside. From Roncesvalles east, it curves along the original shoreline, which is about 30 feet (9.1 m) above and 100 yards (91 m) inland from the shoreline. The south side in that area is open, with views of the Lake. It is predominantly residential, with a commercial section around the intersection with Dufferin Street.

Dufferin Street, running north–south is a major street starting from the CNE to the south, north to Queen Street, where it intersects the railway. The street continues one block to the north and continues north to north of Toronto. It is mixed commercial and residential. South of King along the east side is an old industrial area with loft-type industrial buildings. Construction has been completed to eliminate the Dufferin Street jog at Queen and the railway tracks. Dufferin Street now runs directly north to Wilson Avenue.

Lansdowne Avenue, running north–south from Queen Street north to St. Clair Avenue. It is predominantly a residential street. The former West Toronto Collegiate, now a francophone high school is at College Street and Lansdowne. The former National Cash Register factory at Dundas Street has been a grocery store since the 1980s.

Jameson Avenue, running north–south from Queen Street south to Lake Shore Boulevard. It is predominantly a residential street of apartment buildings. There are two schools on Jameson, Parkdale Collegiate, near Queen, and Queen Victoria Public, just south of King Street. It is also a busy thoroughfare on the west side of Toronto, connecting to the Gardiner Expressway and Lake Shore Boulevard.

== Notable events ==
- 1813 – April 27, 1813 – United States troops land on Parkdale shores to attack Fort York in the Battle of York
- 1853 – Construction of Great Western Railway along waterfront
- 1856 – Opening of Parkdale railway station at Queen and Dufferin Streets
- 1879 – Incorporation of Village of Parkdale

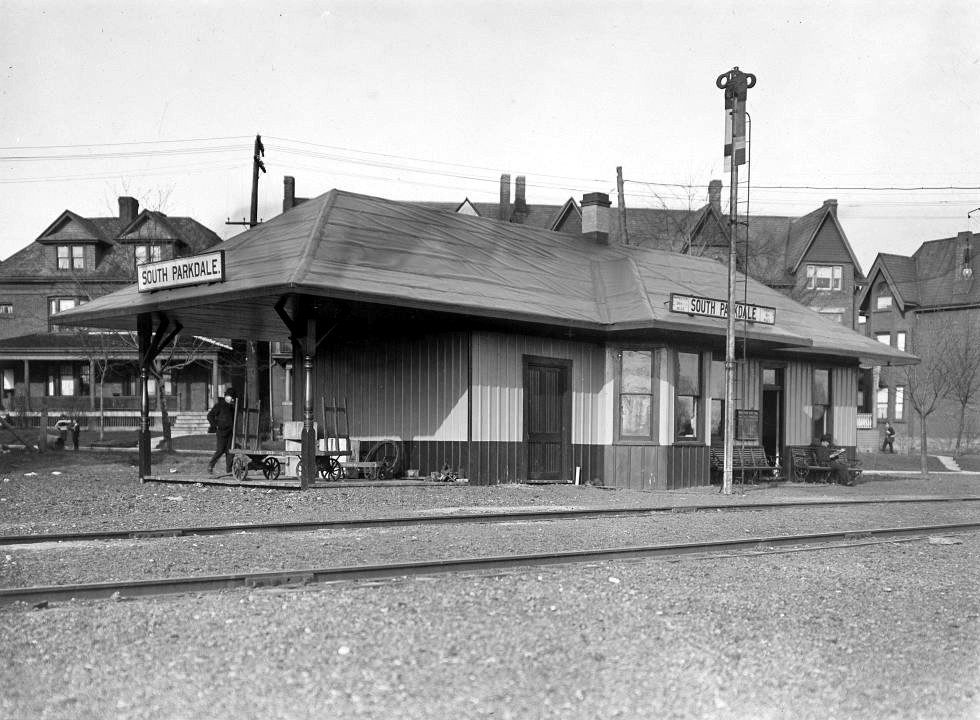
South Parkdale railway station in 1910. The station was opened in 1879.

- 1879 – Opening of South Parkdale railway station at Jameson and Springhurst
- 1879 – Founding of House for Incurables on Dunn Avenue
- 1881 – Founding of Parkdale's first library at St. Mark's Church on Cowan Avenue
- 1885 – North Parkdale Canadian Pacific and Grand Trunk train stations built at Queen and Dufferin
- 1887 – Parkdale Municipal Building built at Queen and Cowan
- 1888 – Founding of Parkdale Collegiate, Queen Victoria Public schools
- 1889 – Annexation of Parkdale into City of Toronto
- July 29, 1892 – A Canadian Pacific Railway train stopped at Parkdale to set off pre-determined rail cars from its train as instructed. While performing this task, the locomotive and some of the Parkdale-bound cars were struck by the remaining portion of its train which had rolled away from its parked position.

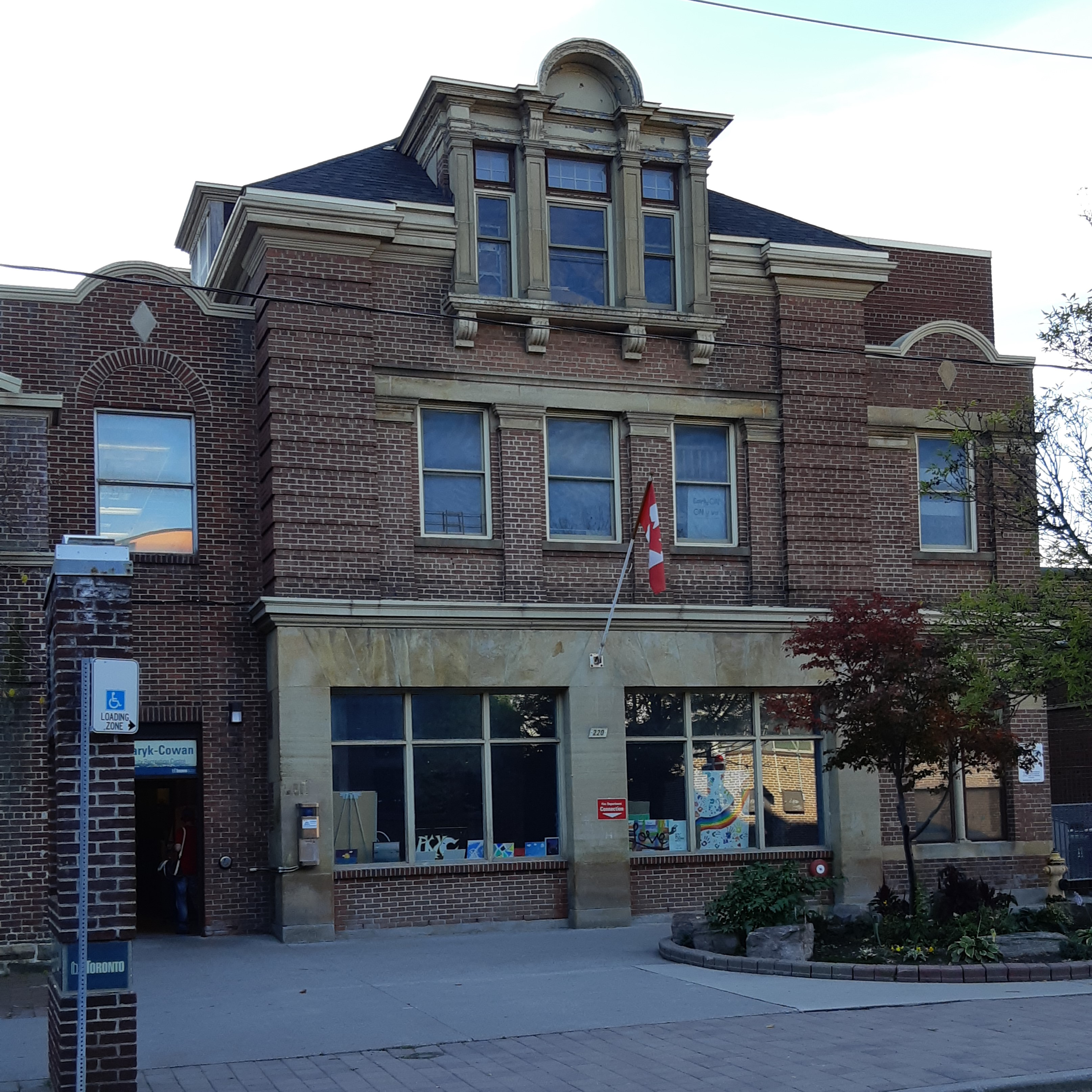
Masaryk-Cowan Community Recreation Centre opened in 1898.

- 1898 – Opening of Masaryk Hall
- 1902 – Construction of original Holy Family church and school
- 1910 – Sunnyside railway station opens at Queen and Roncesvalles
- 1910–1912 – 'Parkdale Grade Separation' project – lowering rail lines through Parkdale
- 1911 – Demolition of South Parkdale railway station
- 1912 – Founding of Canadian National Exhibition
- 1916 – Brothers Frederick and Donald Ryan, proprietors of a roller-skating rink named 'Pavlowa' in today's Masaryk-Cowan Community Recreation Centre, invent the Honey Dew drink, eventually leading to a large chain of Canadian restaurants.
- 1922 – Opening of Sunnyside Beach and Amusement Park
- 1954 – September 9 – Marilyn Bell is first to swim Lake Ontario and comes ashore in Parkdale
- 1955–1964 – Construction of Gardiner Expressway, 170 houses are demolished in Parkdale, demolition of Sunnyside Amusement Park
- 1971 – Closure of Sunnyside railway station
- 1984 – Pope John Paul II open-air mass at Exhibition Place.
- 1998 – Opening of new Parkdale Community Health Centre at Queen and Gwynne
- 1998 – Opening of Parkdale Arts and Cultural Centre at 1313 Queen Street
- 2002 – (July–November) 'Pope Squat' affordable housing protest and occupation of vacant apartment building at 1510 King Street West during visit of Pope John Paul II to Toronto.
- 2010 – Elimination of the 'Dufferin Jog' which routed Dufferin Street around the rail lines at Queen Street.

== Notable residents ==
- Anderson Ruffin Abbott – first Black Canadian to become a physician. He lived on Dowling Avenue from 1890.
- Rob Burgess – a Canadian executive in the technology industry. CEO of Macromedia Inc. from 1996 to 2005 and chairman from 1997 to 2005.
- Cheri DiNovo – Member of Provincial Parliament for Parkdale—High Park
- John Henry Dunn – Businessman, politician and Canada Receiver General.
- Sam Dunn – Canadian musician and film director.
- Bhutila Karpoche – Member of Provincial Parliament for Parkdale—High Park
- Muriel Kauffman – née Muriel Irene McBrien, founding owner of the Kansas City Royals baseball team, along with her husband Ewing Kauffman.
- Beatrice Lillie – World-famous entertainer and comedian
- Matty Matheson – chef, author, YouTuber and television host.
- Fred McBrien – Toronto City Alderman, Member of Provincial Parliament for Parkdale, Member of Parliament for Parkdale.
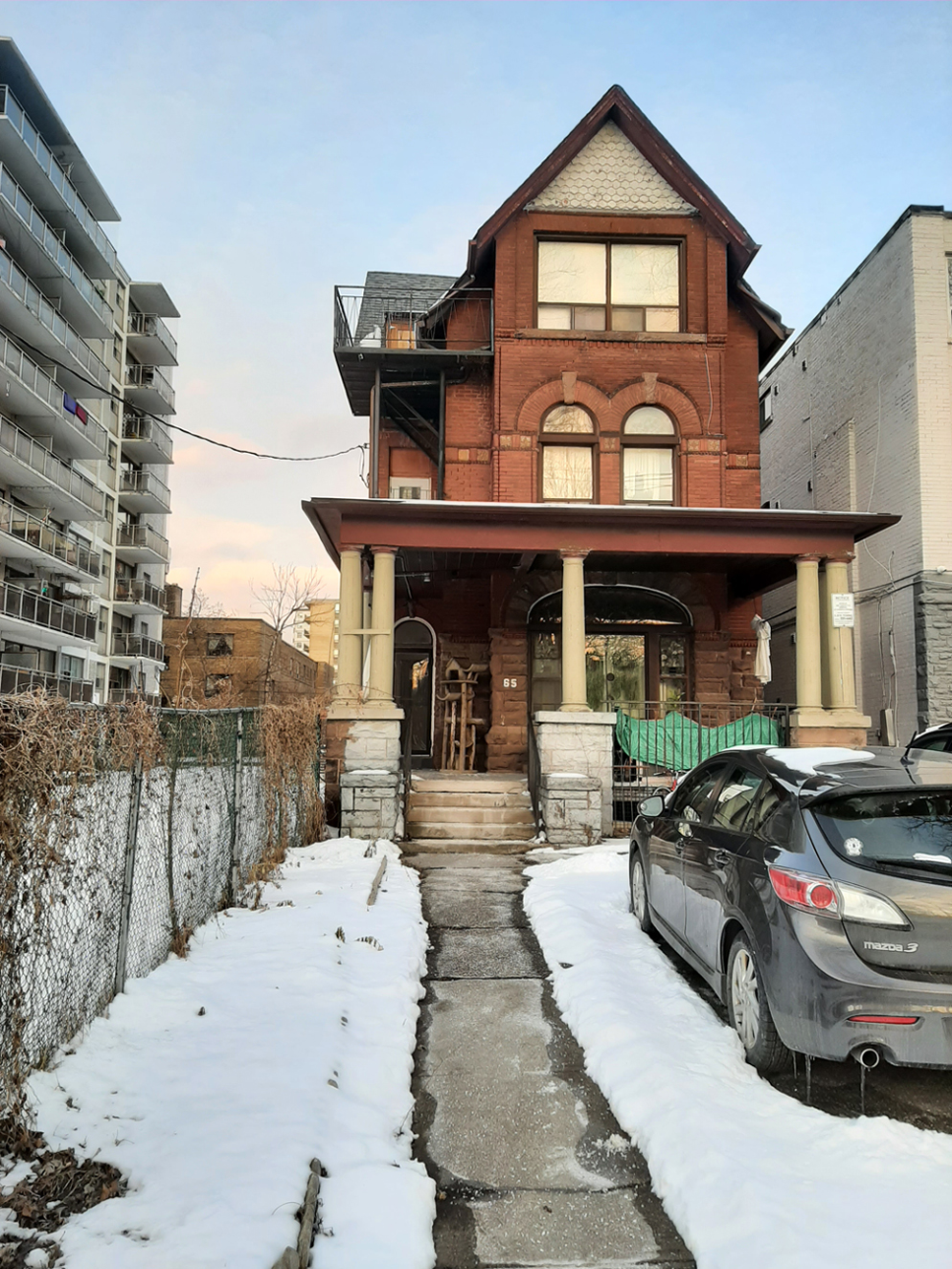
  The famous "House of Balloons" where The Weeknd used to live.
- Dylan Moscovitch – Canadian figure skater, Olympic medalist
- Walter O'Hara – Military officer, landowner.
- David Spence – Toronto City Alderman, Member of Parliament for Parkdale
- Abel Tesfaye a.k.a. "The Weeknd" – rented a home at 65 Spencer Avenue, nicknamed the "House of Balloons" and inspired his debut mixtape of the same name

== In popular media ==
- Sam & Me - A film by Deepa Mehta was filmed and set in Parkdale
- Shelved was set in Parkdale

== See also ==
- Parkdale—High Park electoral district
- Epiphany and St. Mark, Parkdale Anglican church
- Holy Family Roman Catholic Church

== References and notes ==
- McLeod, Peter; McNeil, Malcolm, eds. (1979). Parkdale: A Centennial History.
- Laycock, Margaret (1991). Parkdale in Pictures: Its development to 1889. Toronto Public Library Board. ISBN 0-920601-12-X.
- "Parkdale History". Archived from the original on September 28, 2007.
- "PLEDC timeline". Archived from the original on October 14, 2007.
- Census Data 2006, 2011 (Statistics Canada)
