= South Parkdale station =

Railway station in Toronto, Ontario, Canada

South Parkdale
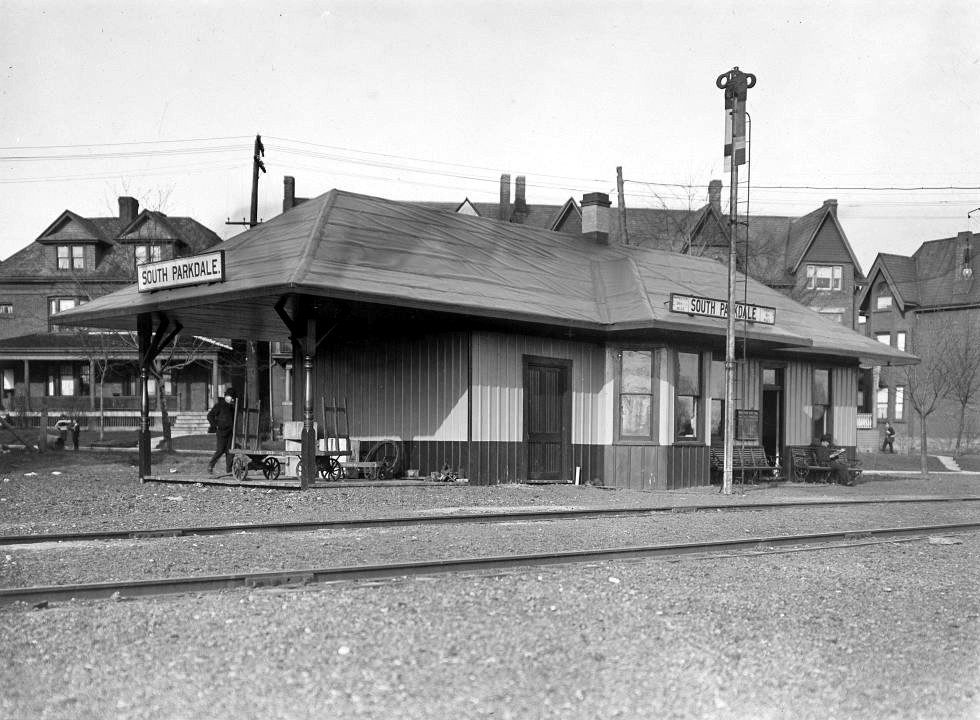

General information
- Location: Springhurst Ave/Jameson Ave; Parkdale, Toronto, Ontario; Canada
- Coordinates: 43°38′01″N 79°26′01″W

Other information
- Status: Demolished in 1911

History
- Opened: 1879
- Closed: 1910
Location

The South Parkdale railway station was a passenger rail station on the Grand Trunk Railway in Toronto, Ontario, Canada. It was located at Jameson Avenue and Springhurst Avenue in the former village of Parkdale. It was demolished in 1911 as part of a grade separation engineering project.

== History ==
The original east–west rail line in the area was built in 1855 by the Great Western Railway (GWR). It connected Toronto to the east and Hamilton to the west, following the Lake Ontario shoreline, passing through the then-rural Parkdale area. By 1879, the population in the Parkdale area had grown and the GWR built the South Parkdale station. It was named "South Parkdale" to distinguish it from the existing Parkdale railway station at Dufferin Avenue and Queen Street, which was renamed "North Parkdale." In 1882, the GWR was absorbed into the Grand Trunk Railway which took over the line and the South Parkdale station became a GTR station.

From the west, the rail line climbed from the level of lakeshore up to Parkdale and then down again to enter the centre of Toronto. Early in the 1900s, the GTR decided to eliminate the climb by making a cut from east of Dufferin Avenue to west of Dowling Avenue, along the existing railway right-of-way. Bridges over the new cut were constructed at Dufferin, Dunn, Jameson and Dowling streets to preserve access to the lake shore and Exhibition grounds. West of Dowling Avenue, the new rail line bed was raised from the previous waterfront level to make an even elevation from the Humber River east to Sunnyside, providing subways at several points to provide grade-separated access to the waterfront from the north. The project levelled the rails from Strachan Avenue all the way west to the Humber.

South Parkdale station was demolished in 1911 as part of the grade separation project. A temporary station was constructed west of Jameson Avenue to serve during the project. In 1912, this second station was closed, and the passenger rail services were moved to the new Sunnyside station further west at Roncesvalles Avenue and Queen Street.

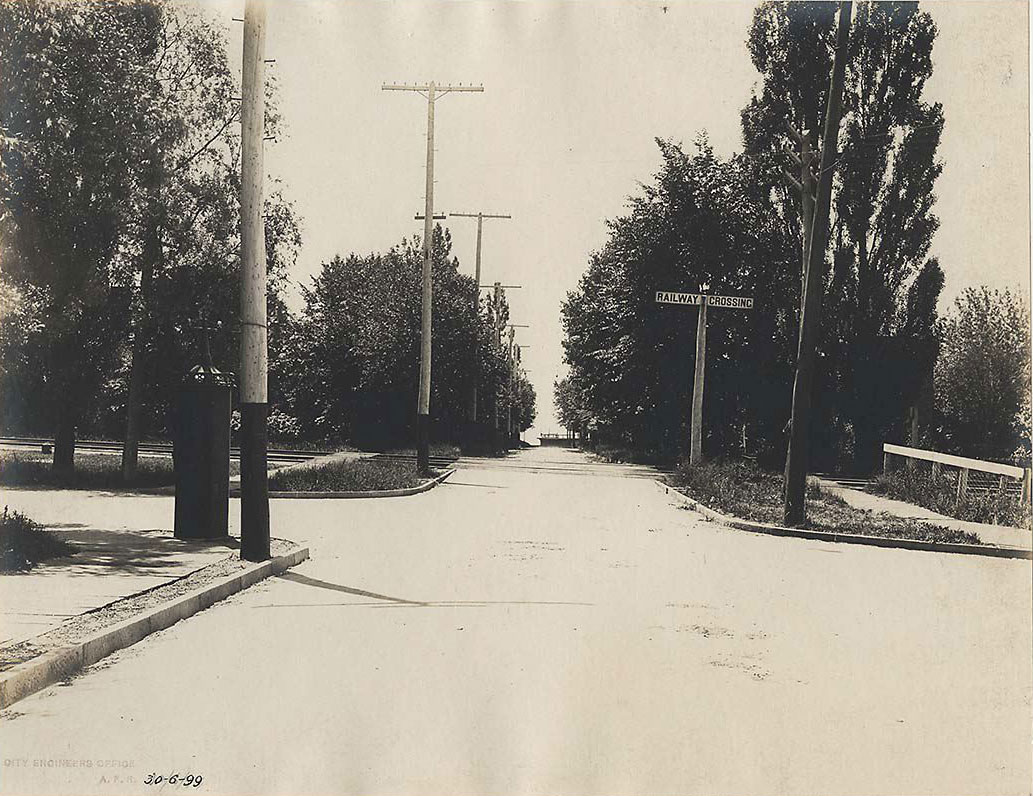
Jameson Avenue, 1899, looking south across G.T.R tracks.

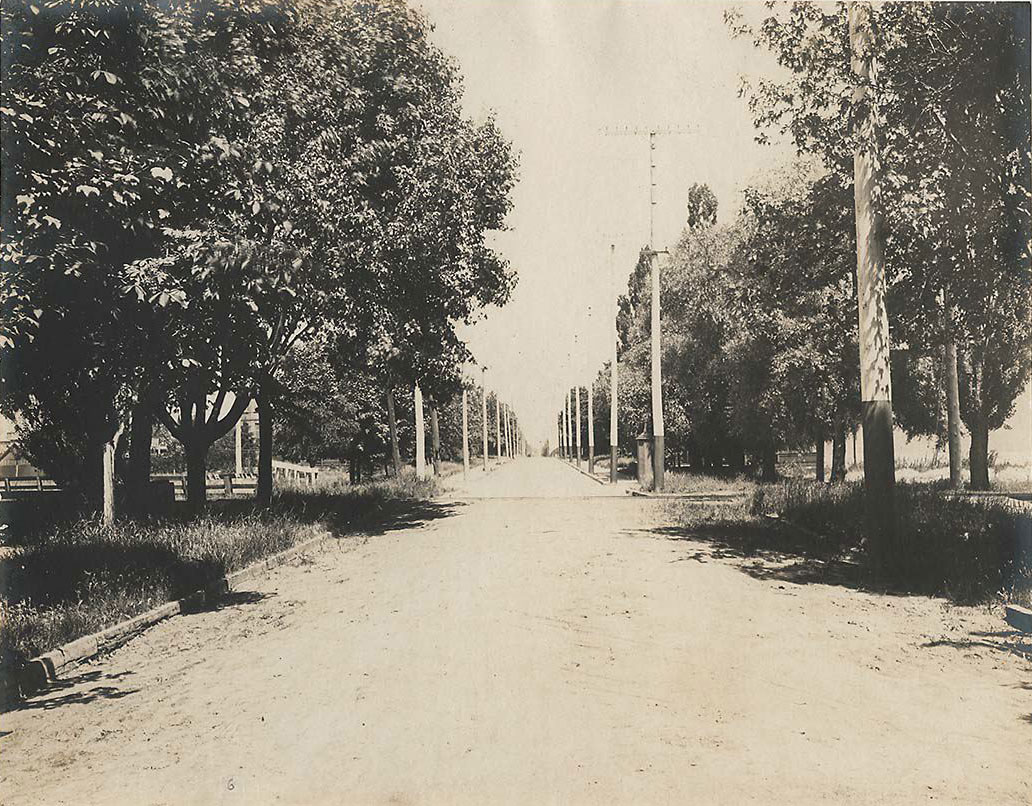
Jameson Avenue, 1899, looking north across G.T.R tracks.

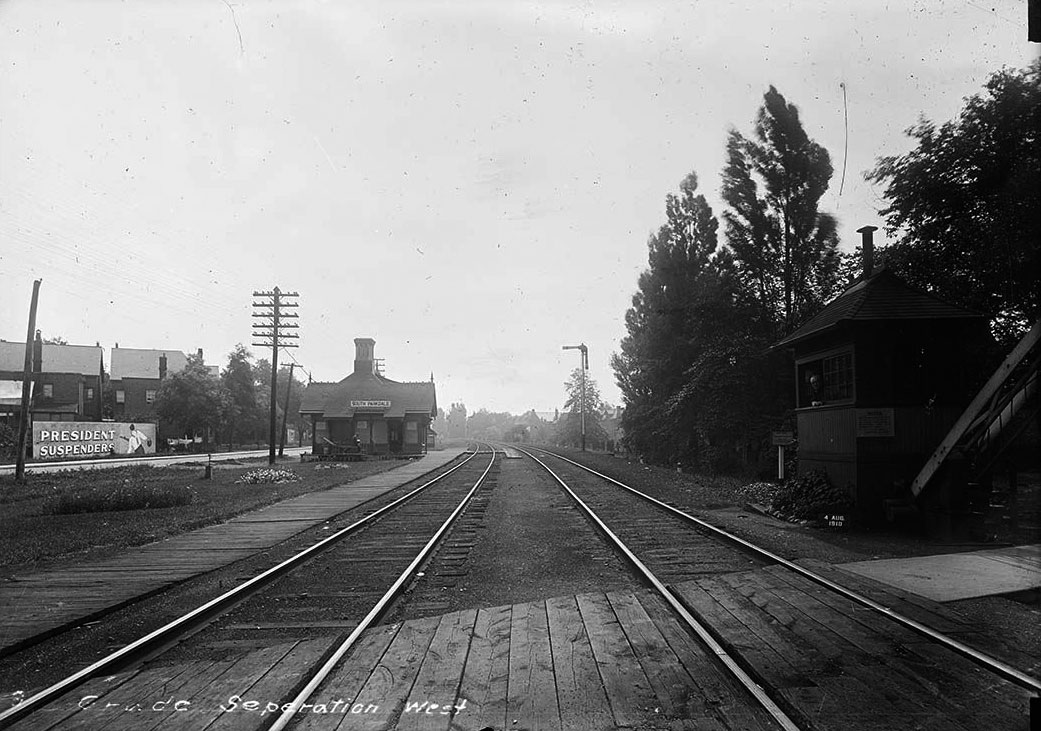
Looking east from Jameson Avenue, 1910 to South Parkdale station.

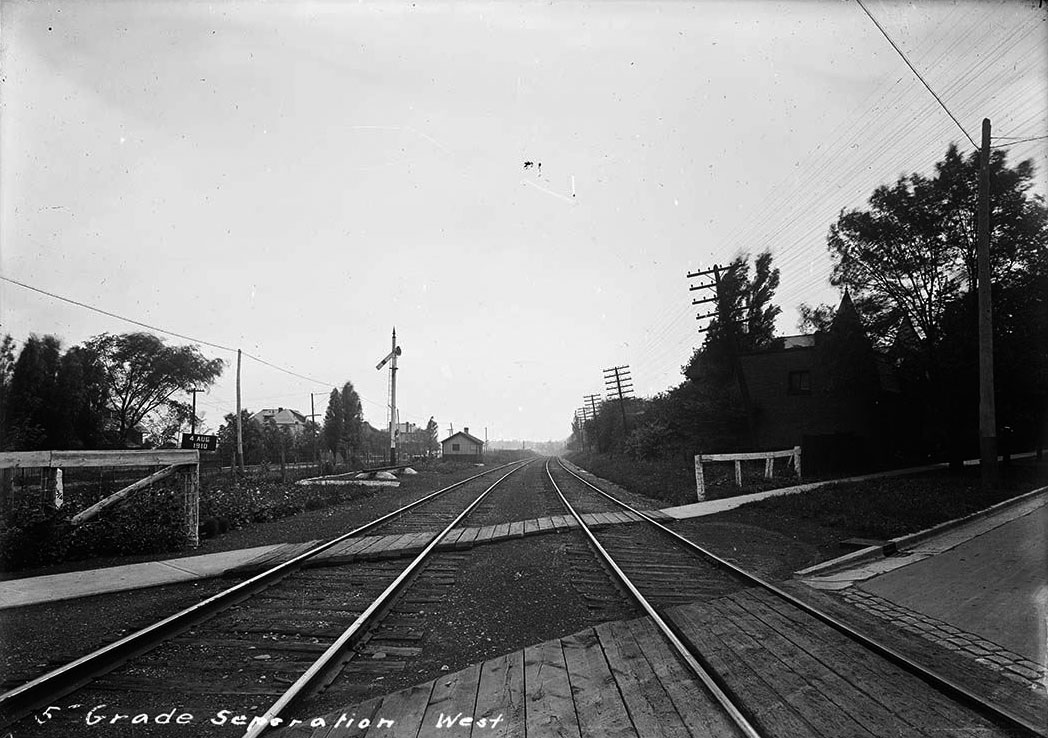
G.T.R. rail lines, 1910, prior to grade separation, looking west from Dowling Avenue.

Grade separation

After the temporary station was opened, the South Parkdale station was closed and temporary tracks laid to detour around the digging to proceed at the location of the existing tracks.

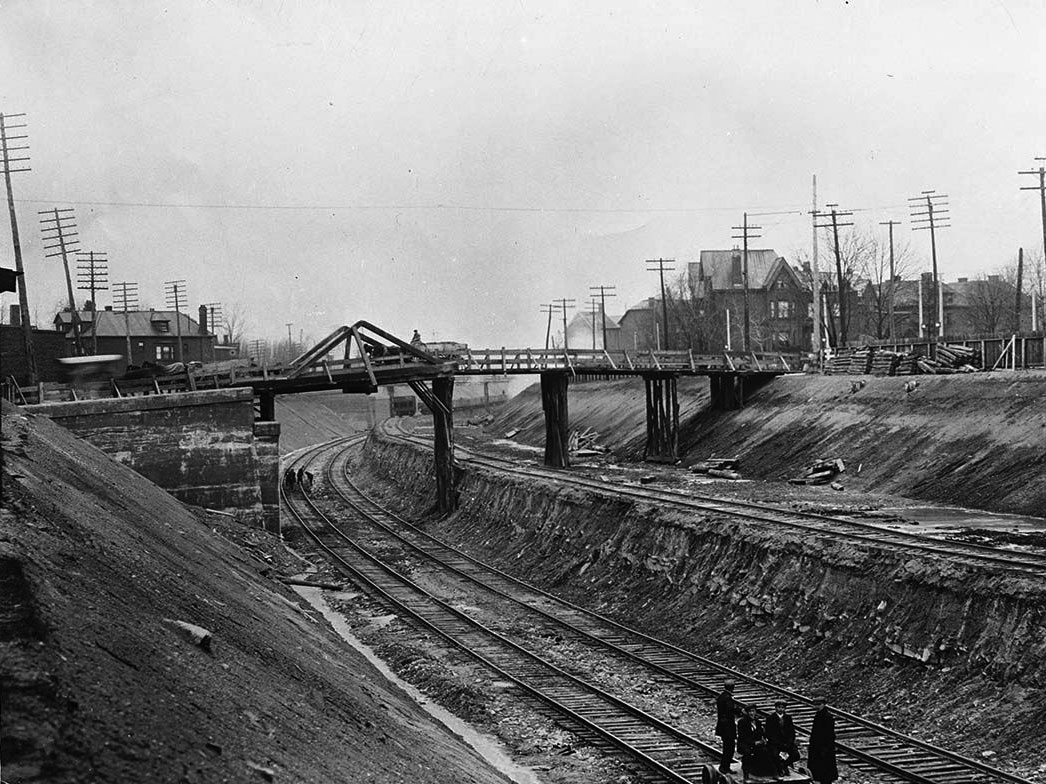
Temporary bridge for Jameson Avenue during grade separation project.

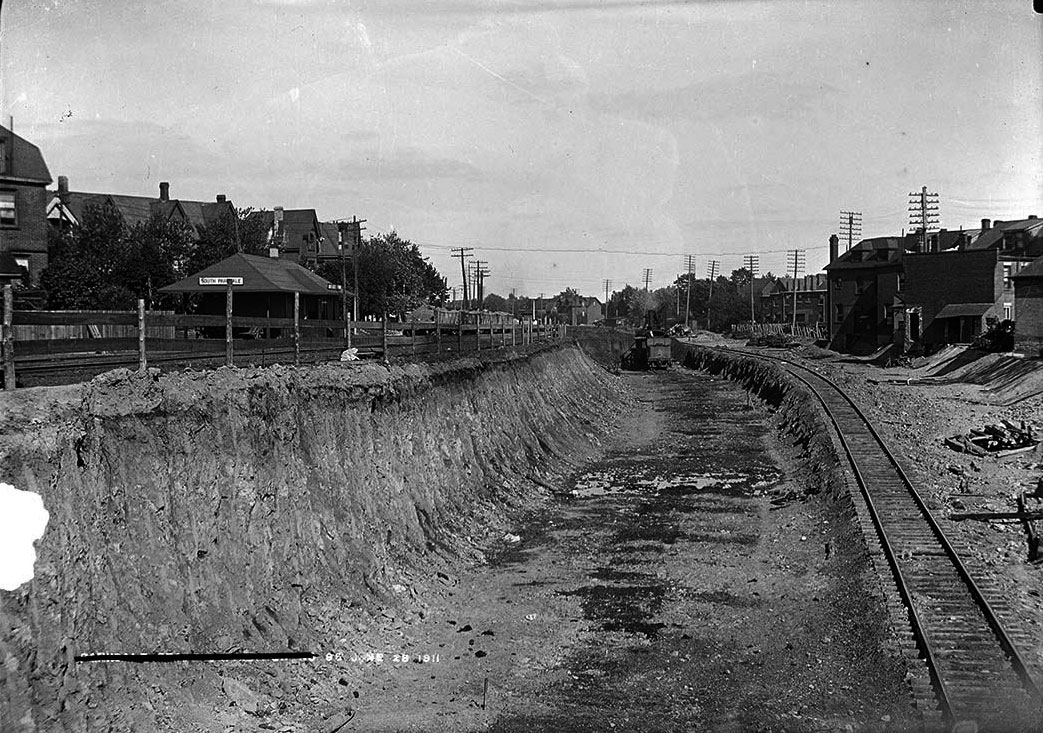
View of grade separation to south of Station.
