= Parkdale, Minnesota =

Parkdale
- Unincorporated community
- Location within Minnesota Location within the United States
- Coordinates: 46°14′00″N 96°00′46″W
- Country: United States
- State: Minnesota
- County: Otter Tail
- Elevation: 1,197 ft (365 m)
- Time zone: UTC-6 (Central (CST))
  - Summer (DST): UTC-5 (CDT)
- Area code: 218
- GNIS feature ID: 654871

Parkdale is an unincorporated community in Otter Tail County, in the U.S. state of Minnesota.

== History ==
Parkdale was originally called Hazel Dell, and under the latter name was platted in 1876. A post office operated under the name Parkdale between 1877 and 1893.
