= Roncesvalles Avenue =

Street in Toronto, Ontario, Canada

Coordinates: 43.64854°N 79.4499°W

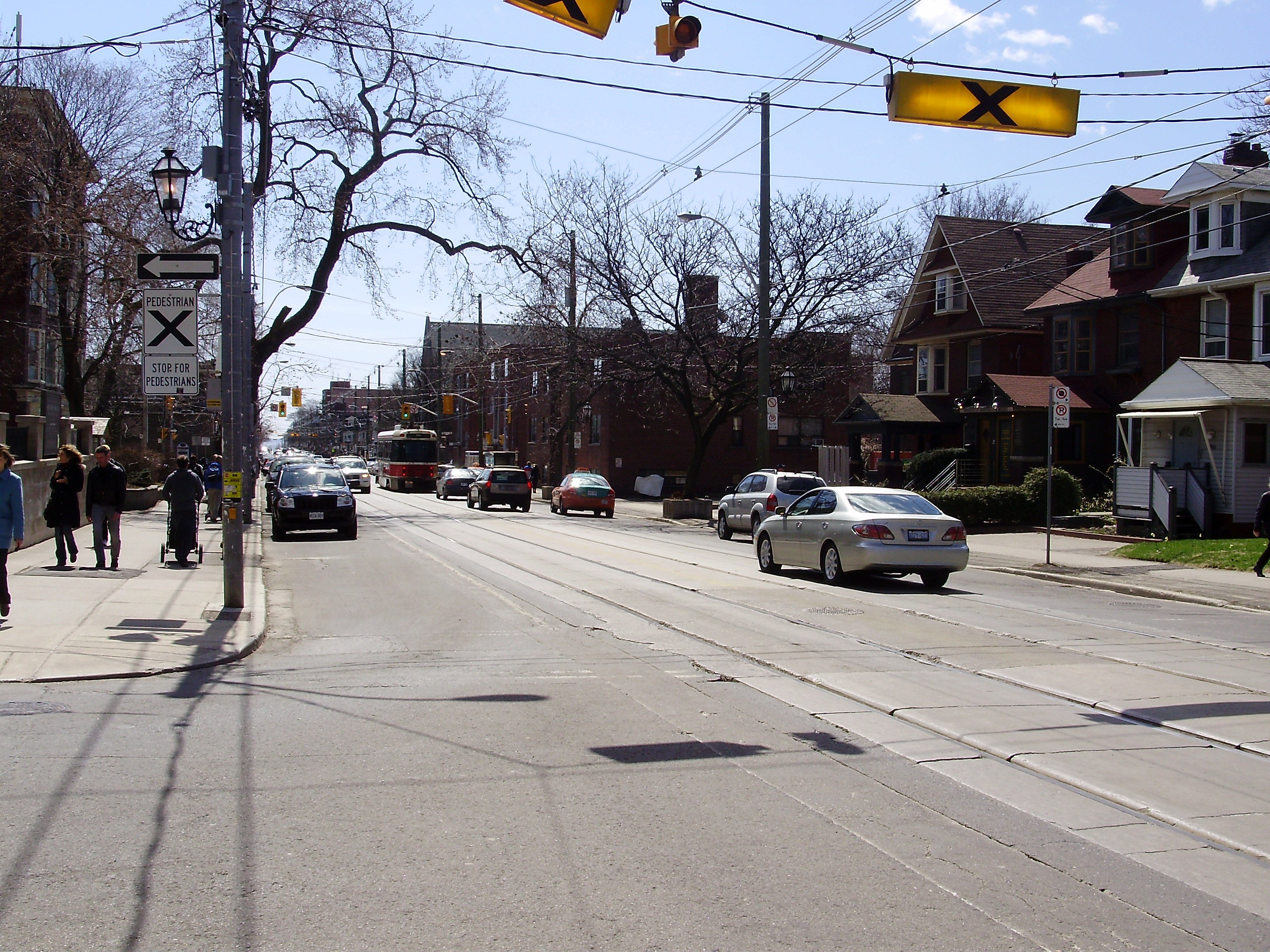
- The 504 King streetcar provides regular transit service along the length of Roncesvalles Avenue

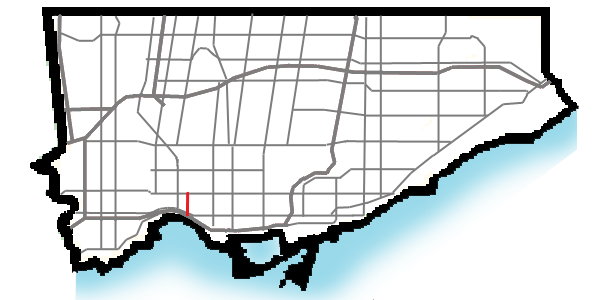
- Maintained by: City of Toronto government
- Location: Toronto
- South end: Queen Street / The Queensway (continues as Roncesvalles Avenue)
- North end: Dundas Street

Roncesvalles Avenue is a north–south minor arterial street in Toronto, Ontario, Canada. It begins at the intersection of Queen Street West, King Street West and the Queensway running north to Dundas Street West. At its southern starting point, King Street West traffic continues northward onto Roncesvalles Avenue unless the traffic turns east or west onto Queen Street West or the Queensway. At its northern end point, traffic continues onto Dundas Street, which is essentially a straight-line northern extension of Roncesvalles.

Roncesvalles Avenue takes its name from the Battle of Roncesvalles, which took place in the Roncesvalles Pass in Spain in 1813. (The name 'Roncesvalles' means 'valley of thorns' in Spanish.) At this gorge, Colonel Walter O'Hara—an early 19th-century Irish settler who played a significant role in the establishment of the neighbourhood—led a regiment that fought against the retreating army of Napoleon.

== Description ==
Roncesvalles Avenue has two centre traffic lanes carrying both road and streetcar traffic, 24/7 curb-side parking and bicycle lanes located between the on-street parking and the traffic lanes. At streetcar stops, the sidewalk is extended up to the streetcar tracks for easier boarding.

Along the east side of the street from Queen Street to Dundas, the buildings are storefronts with upper apartments. Most of the buildings date from 1910 and later. Along the west side, the land usage is more diverse. At the intersection of Queen Street and Roncesvalles, there is a hotel. Behind the intersection is the large Roncesvalles Carhouse, a TTC streetcar maintenance and storage facility. Further north is the Copernicus Lodge, a retirement home. Residential usage predominates along the west side, with some commercial storefronts around the intersection with Howard Park Avenue.

Businesses along Roncesvalles Avenue are organized into the "Roncesvalles Village Business Improvement Area". The residential neighbourhood, formerly part of the former villages of Brockton and Parkdale, is today simply classified as Roncesvalles. Many of the businesses there serve the city's Polish population.

== History ==
The first mention of Roncesvalles Avenue in atlases of Toronto was in 1860. The roadway was built to connect Queen Street with Dundas Street, then the main highway west. King Street West was extended to the foot of Roncesvalles in the 1880s. The Queensway was built in the 1950s by extending a short stub of Queen Street west of Roncesvalles. The area around the street at the time of its construction was primarily agricultural with market gardens.

In 1856, the sons of Colonel O'Hara laid out Roncesvalles Avenue by dividing the lands along the street into lots. In 1879, the street became the western boundary of Parkdale. In 1904, Joseph Phillips was owner York Region Loan and Savings Co. and had a five-story head office erected on Roncesvalles Avenue. Phillips built and sold estate homes on the west side of Roncesvalles Avenue, setting the pattern of residential on the west side and mixed use on the east side. After Phillips went to jail in 1906 for being a loan shark, Home Smith took over to promote development. Using his connections, Smith arranged a streetcar line on Roncesvalles Avenue and the creation of Sunnyside Amusement Park. He also converted the York Region Loan building into luxury apartments setting a trend in the area for such apartments. There was a building boom in the area between 1910 and 1924.

Between 2009 and 2011, Roncesvalles Avenue was rebuilt to a new street design done after construction work to replace 100-year old water and sewer pipes as well as worn-out streetcar tracks. The new street design included wider sidewalks made of paving stones with planters for holding 85 new trees, benches and "streetcar stop bumpouts". (Bumpouts are sidewalk extensions allowing passengers to board streetcars without stepping into the street.) The street's curb lanes were narrowed from 12–13 feet to 6.5 feet to become 24/7 parking lanes. Bicycle lanes were added to the street.

== Streetcar stop bumpouts ==
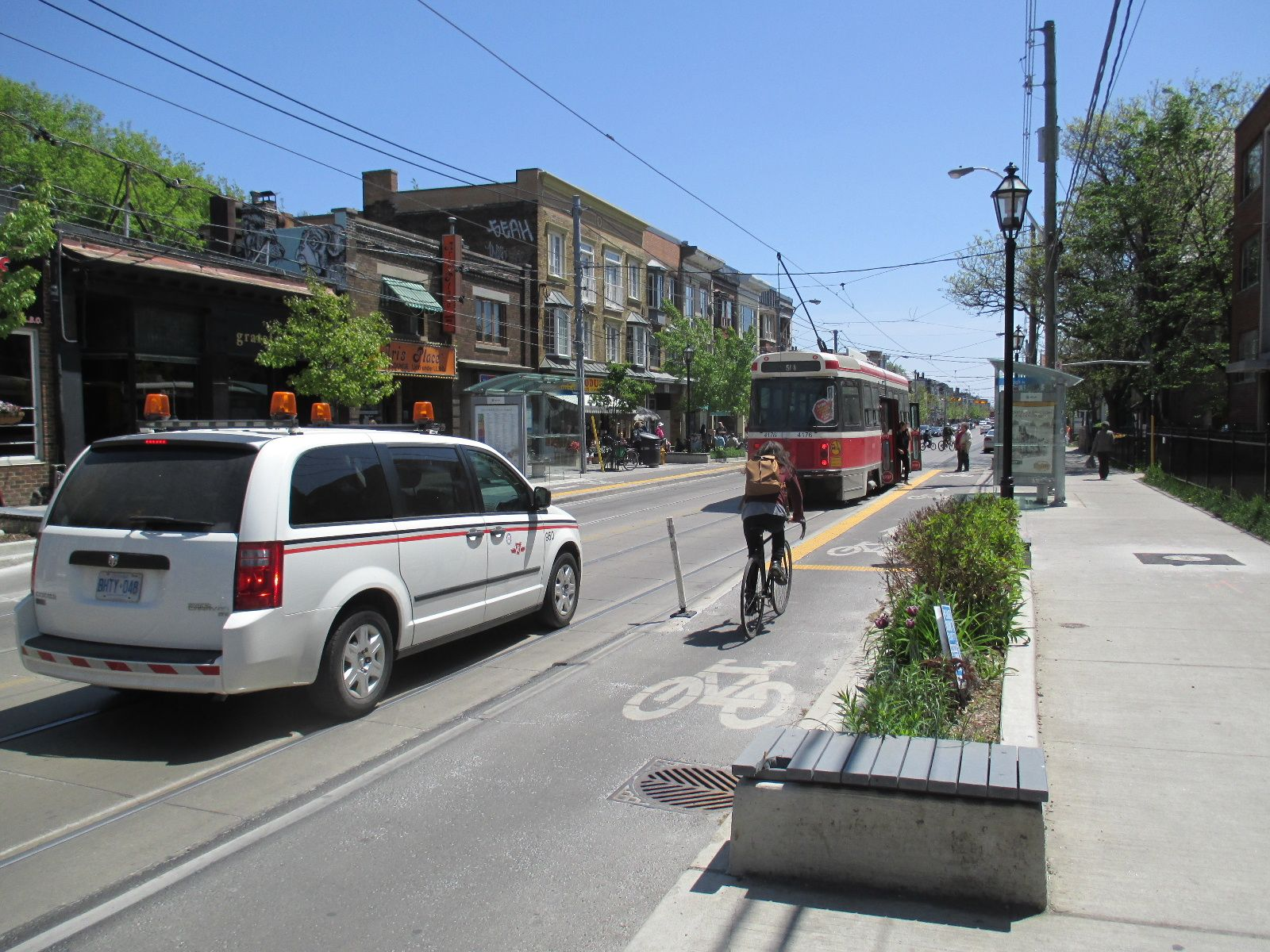
Bumpout on Roncesvalles Avenue serving as both a streetcar loading platform as well as a bicycle lane

On December 19, 2010, 504 King streetcar service resumed on Roncesvalles Avenue after track replacement work and a redesign of the street. The new street design included bike lanes and a widened sidewalk "bumpout" at stops to allow riders to board streetcars directly from the curb. In these sections, the bike lane gently rises from the main road to run on top of the bumpout; when a streetcar is stopped at a bumpout, cyclists are required to stop and allow riders to board or alight from the vehicle. Making the bicycle lane go over the bumpout avoids the problem of forcing bicycles into the streetcar lane and getting caught in the grooves of the streetcar tracks.

The bumpouts were also to allow easier access to streetcars for strollers and wheelchairs. However, even though accessible, low-floor Flexity Outlook streetcars were introduced on the 504 King route and Roncesvalles Avenue on January 2, 2018, the bumpouts are not yet accessible due to platform height issues preventing the loading ramp on the Flexity streetcars from being deployed.

From February 2021 to December 2022, the TTC planned to rebuild the streetcar junction at the intersection of King Street West, The Queensway, Queen Street West and Roncesvalles Avenue (KQQR). In 2022, as part of the KQQR reconstruction, the TTC would also modify the bumpouts along Roncesvalles Avenue, from Harvard Avenue to Dundas Street West, to comply with the requirements of the province's Accessibility for Ontarians with Disabilities Act (AODA). Also as part of the KQQR rebuild, two additional bumpouts (north- and southbound) would be installed along Roncesvalles Avenue on the north side of the KQQR intersection. The KQQR project would also add an eastbound bumpout on Queen Street, similar to those on Roncesvalles, at the south-east corner of the KQQR intersection; this would replace an eastbound, island platform on The Queenway on the west side of the KQQR intersection. After completion of the work, streetcar service resumed along Roncesvalles Avenue on May 7, 2023, ending two years of bus replacement on the west end of the 504 King route. As part of that work, platform heights were raised for accessibility with Flexity streetcars along Roncesvalles Avenue.

== See also ==
- Parkdale, Toronto
- Roncesvalles, Toronto
