= Sunnyside station (Toronto) =

Former railway station in Canada

Sunnyside
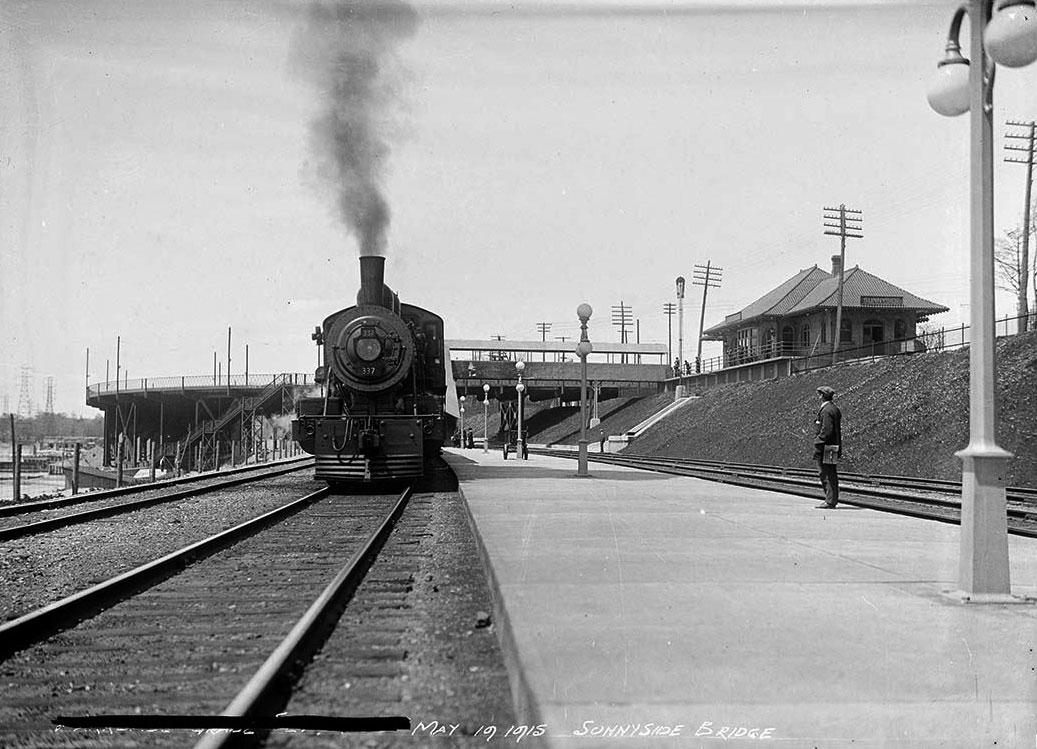
- Looking west along the station platform in 1915

General information
- Location: Toronto, Ontario; Canada
- Coordinates: 43°38′18″N 79°26′46″W
- Connections: Sunnyside Bus Terminal; TTC Streetcars

Other information
- Status: Demolished in 1973

History
- Opened: 1910
- Closed: 1971

Former services
Preceding station	Canadian National Railway	Following station
Oakville toward Sarnia	Grand Trunk Railway; Main Line	Toronto toward Montreal
Mimico toward Suspension Bridge	Niagara Falls – Toronto; Local stops	Toronto Terminus
Preceding station	Canadian Pacific Railway	Following station
Hamilton Terminus	Hamilton – Toronto	Toronto Terminus
Location

Sunnyside station was a railway station at the intersection of King Street, Queen Street West and Roncesvalles Avenue in Toronto, Ontario, Canada. It operated passenger service from 1912 until 1967.

The station was built by the Grand Trunk Railway from 1910 to 1912 and was well-situated, with access to nearby streetcars and the Sunnyside Amusement Park. The station was later taken over by Canadian National Railways. It was closed in 1967 after the introduction of GO Transit, which bypassed the station, and was demolished in 1973.

== History ==
Sunnyside station was built by the Grand Trunk Railway (GTR) at the foot of Roncesvalles Avenue and opened in December 1912. It was built to replace South Parkdale station to the east and Swansea station to the west. These changes were part of a grade separation project which brought the tracks, laid by the Great Western Railway in 1855, to an even grade from the Humber River to Union Station.

The station and line were nationalized into Canadian National Railways in 1923. Passenger service to Sunnyside stopped in 1967, when GO Transit was formed to provide commuter service in the Greater Toronto Area, building its own stations at Exhibition and Mimico. Sunnyside was demolished in 1973 and replaced with the Beaty Boulevard Parkette.

== Structure and amenities ==
The station was built at street level, with stairs descending to a platform for westbound trains. A pedestrian flyover crossed over the tracks where stairs accessed another platform for eastbound trains. The platform (and station) provided a view of Lake Ontario, but was exposed to the weather.

The location was well-situated, with access to the popular Sunnyside Amusement Park and streetcar routes nearby. A coach station, the Sunnyside Bus Terminal, was built across the street in 1936, providing access to motor coaches of the Gray Coach bus lines. The Edgewater Hotel was built next to the bus station on the north-west corner of the intersection in 1939.

== Service ==
A total of 10 Canadian Pacific and 14 Canadian National trains stopped at Sunnyside daily from 1923. Ridership declined as automobiles came into greater use.

== Current use ==
Beaty Boulevard Parkette
- Interactive map of Beaty Boulevard Parkette
- Location: 1575 King Street West, Toronto
- Operator: Toronto Parks
- Website: Beaty Parkette

The site of the former station is now Beaty Boulevard Parkette, a small city park. The park is home to Katyń Monument commemorating the 1940 Katyn massacre in Poland.

== Gallery ==
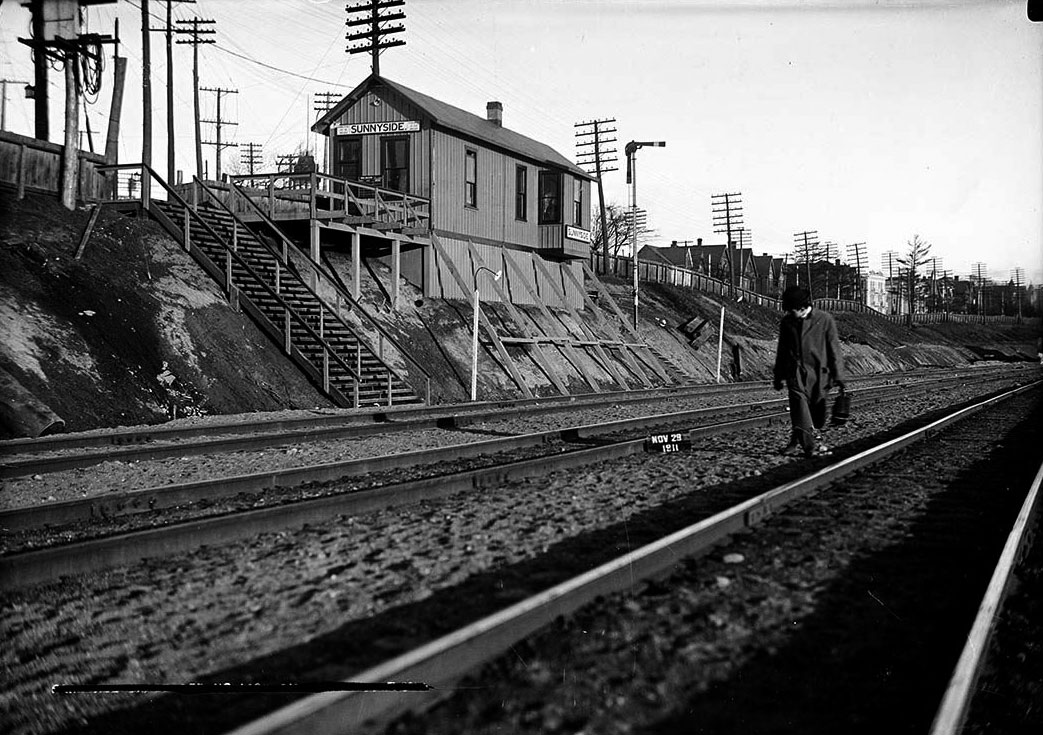
Temporary station in 1911

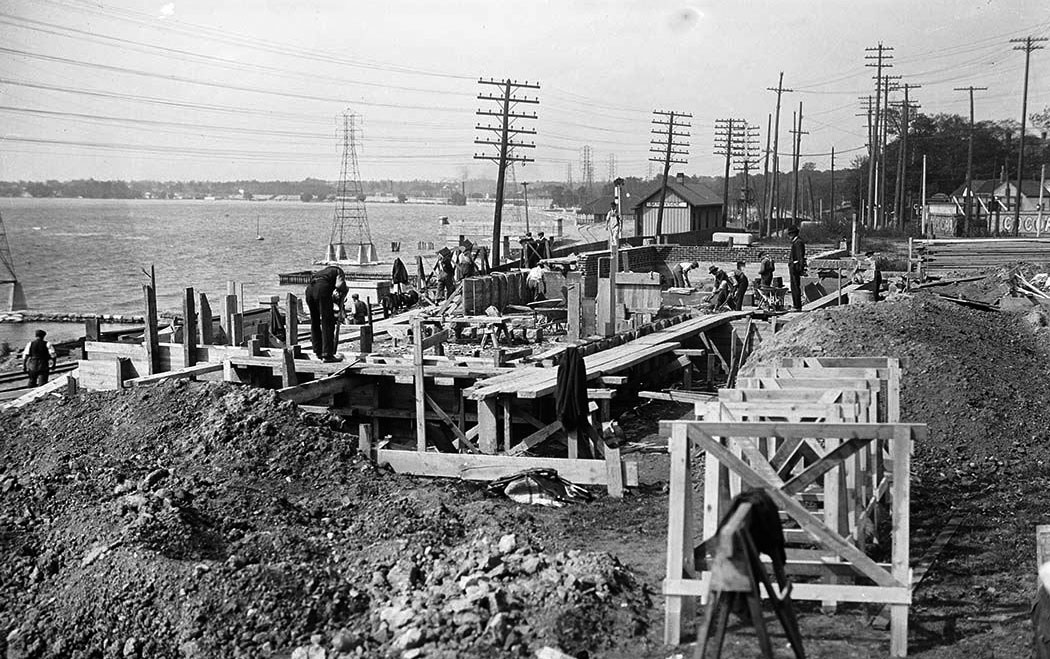
Permanent station under construction in 1912.

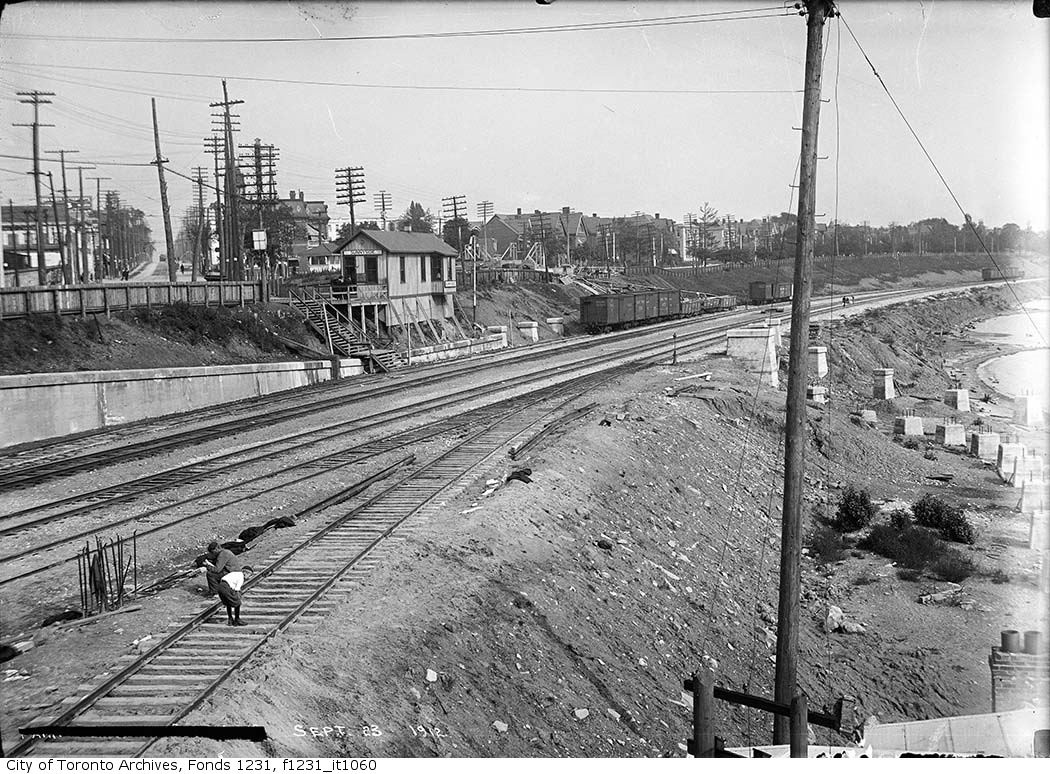
Permanent station under construction, 1912.

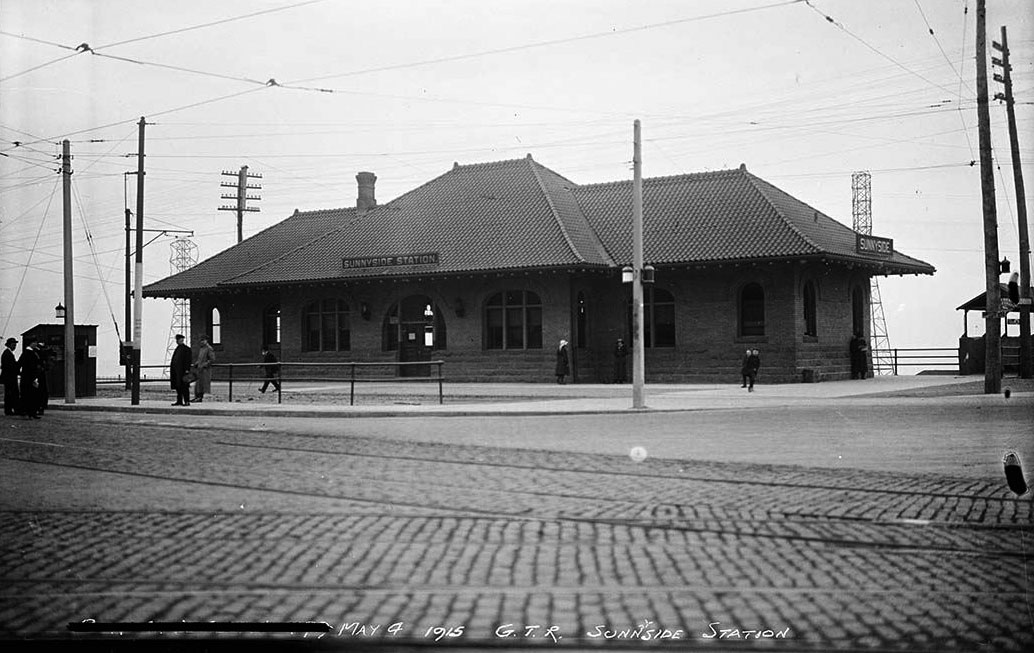
Permanent station, view from street level, 1915

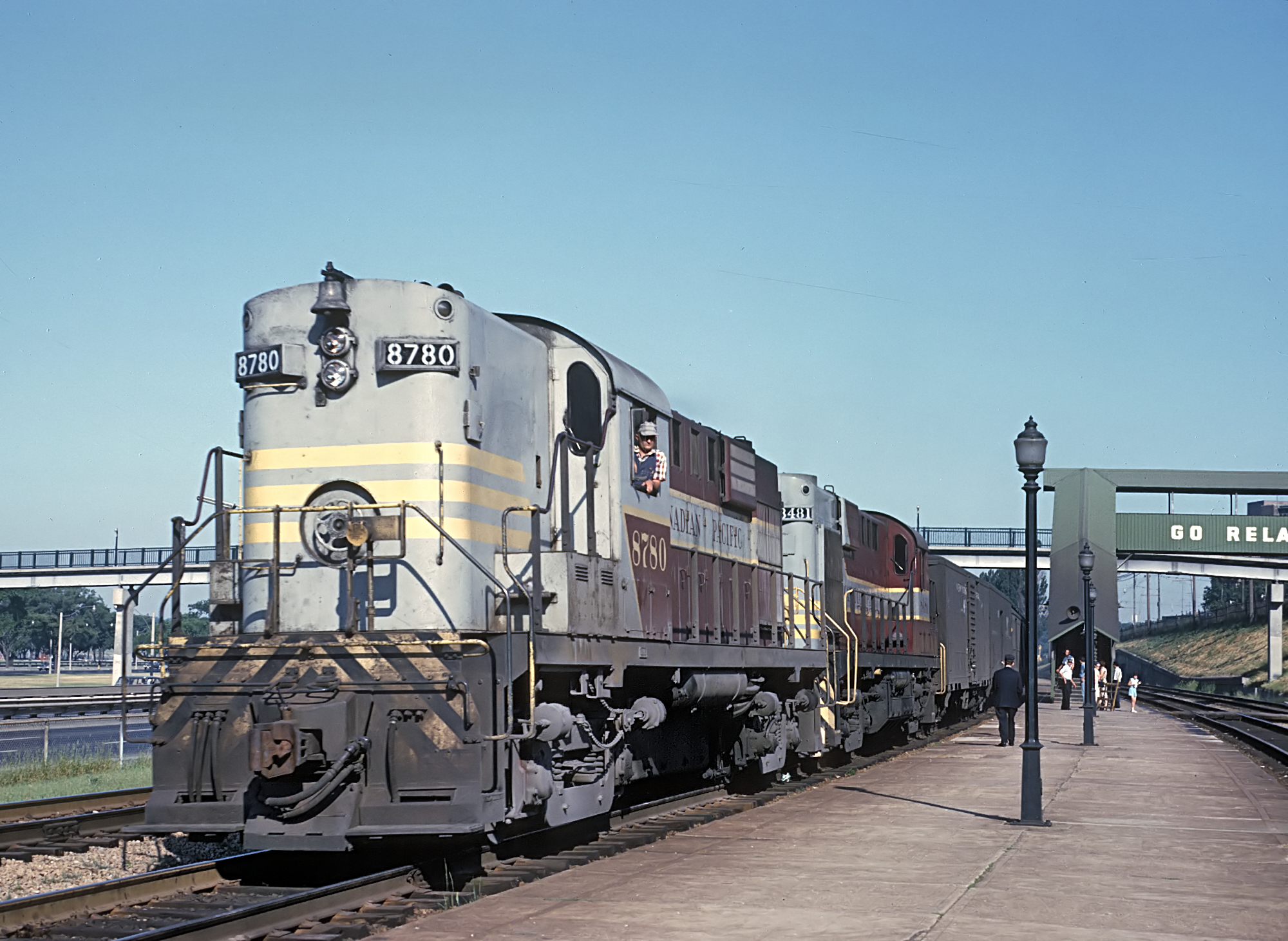
Sunnyside in 1966

== See also ==
- Roncesvalles, Toronto
- Sunnyside, Toronto
