= History of Toronto Island Airport =

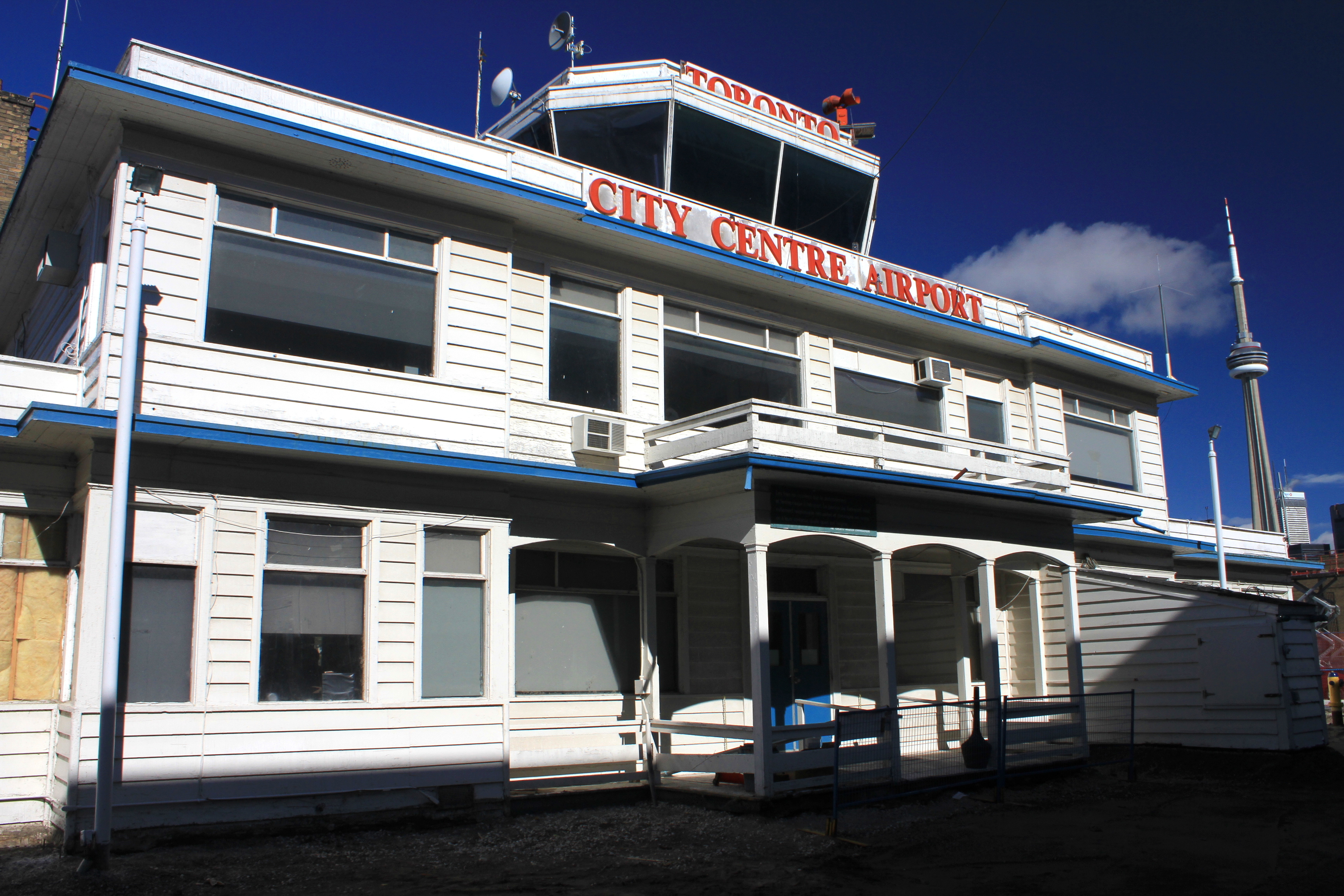
Island Airport terminal

Originally conceived in the 1930s as the main airport for Toronto, the Toronto island airport (today known as Billy Bishop Toronto City Airport) has long been a source for political debate as to the proper use of its waterfront site in central Toronto. Building the airport necessitated the closure of park lands, a hotel, cottages and an amusement park on the Toronto Island site. Construction of the airport in the late 1930s was stopped and started and its final construction only went ahead after the death of the Toronto mayor who had opposed its construction.

At the same time, Toronto built Malton Airport as a secondary air field, but it was Malton that became Toronto's main airport (today known as Toronto Pearson International Airport). This fact meant that the island airport became used mainly for general civil aviation and lost money on its operations. During the 1940s and 1950s, several political leaders proposed the expansion of the airport as a way to enable scheduled passenger airlines and reduce the airport deficits. An expansion of runways and facilities was completed in 1962, financed by the sale of Malton Airport to the Government of Canada. Despite the improvements, the island airport did not become a passenger airline hub, and its existence came into question, starting in the 1960s. In 1968, the site was proposed for a large housing development known as 'Harbor City.' In the 1970s, as part of a debate around airports serving Toronto, the airport became the focus of efforts to set up a network of airports in Canada serving Short-Take-Off-And-Landing (STOL) regional airlines. From a peak of over 200,000 annual flights in the 1960s, the island airport went into decline even as several regional airlines operated at the airport from the 1970s onwards. The annual operating deficit forced its operator, the Toronto Harbour Commission (THC) to sell land to pay the ongoing deficit and by the 1990s, the airport was again facing questions about its continued existence.

In 2000, the Government of Canada re-organized the operation of port operations in Canada, including the formation of the Toronto Port Authority (TPA) to replace the Harbour Commission as the operator of Toronto Harbour and the island airport, with a focus on self-sufficiency and business practices. The new agency's plans to expand usage at the airport to erase its deficit, awoke a long-simmering disagreement between community groups and Toronto politicians wishing to close the airport and the business community which supported the expansion of its usage. The TPA welcomed a new regional airline Porter Airlines and started construction of a bridge to the airport in 2003. The bridge to the airport became a mayoral election issue and the City of Toronto forced its cancellation. Despite the opposition, the TPA bought new passenger ferries and built new facilities for passengers. For its part, Porter built a new passenger terminal. Increases in flights and a new passenger user fee imposed by the TPA led to the airport becoming self-sufficient by 2010. In 2012, the TPA began a project to link the airport to Toronto with a pedestrian tunnel, funded by the passenger user fee, which is intended to facilitate a further increase in flights. In 2013, Porter proposed to expand the airport to fly jets from the airport, but this was cancelled in 2015.

== 1938–1999: Toronto Harbour Commission years ==
=== Construction ===
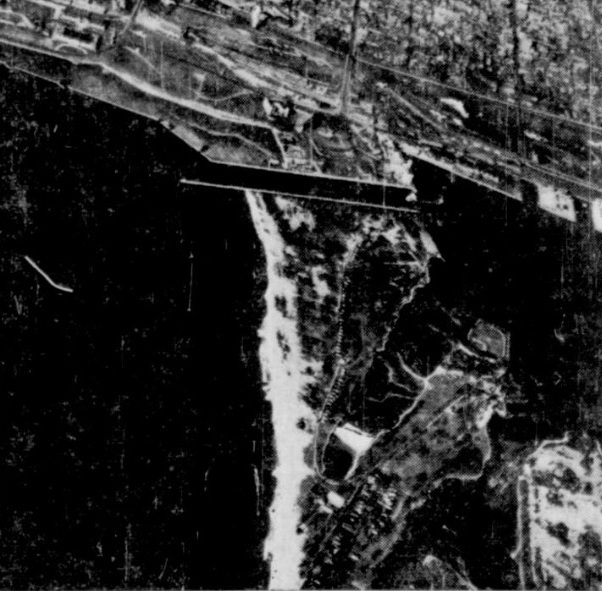
Aerial view of the airport site in 1937, prior to construction. Hanlan's baseball stadium can be seen to middle right

The first proposal to build an airport was made in June 1929 by the Toronto Harbour Commission. The Commission proposed a four-stage plan, starting with an "air harbour" for seaplanes, while the final stages proposed filling the then-regatta course lagoon between the sandbar and Hanlan's Point. Toronto City Council at that time agreed to the "air harbour" but "in no way-either by implication or suggestion- implies approval of the ultimate development of a combined air harbour and airport." In 1935, in a different environment, City Council received approval from the Government of Canada under prime minister Richard Bedford Bennett to spend $976,000 ($22 million in 2025 dollars) on a tunnel across the Gap and construction began, with the idea that the tunnel would make the airport feasible. Council itself approved the tunnel and airport projects on August 8, 1935, by a vote of 15–7, against the opposition of Toronto mayor Samuel McBride. That fall, after construction began, a federal election was held and William Lyon Mackenzie King was elected as prime minister. King's government reversed the previous government's decision, cancelling the tunnel project. Over $106,000 ($2.38 million in 2025 dollars) was paid out for already-completed work and putting the site back to its original condition.

In 1936, mayor McBride died and the largest opponent to the airport was gone. Trans-Canada Air Lines was expected to begin operations in 1937, so in November 1936, City Council formed an "Advisory Airport Committee" to advise on where to build a municipal airport. The committee proposed several locations and of these two were approved by the Government of Canada, which agreed to fund one-quarter of the project. The two sites were the Island and Malton, north-west of Toronto. A seaplane and land airport would be built at the island, and an auxiliary field was to be built at Malton. The project would fill in the regatta lagoon and extend the airport site on both the east and west sides. The total cost building both airports was estimated at $1.9 million, ($40.5 million in 2025 dollars) of which $1 million would be spent by the City of Toronto government.

The proposal split council. Mayor William D. Robbins advocated the building of both air fields, as proposed. Councillor Ralph Day urged that the City drop the Island Airport to save money on the basis that two air fields were not needed. Councillor Smith led a faction that opposed building on the Island entirely. Other factions wanted to hold off approval until the Government of Canada agreed to pay a bigger share, or do further study, or build the island airport only. On July 9, 1937, after two days of debate, City Council voted 14–7 to approve the construction of both airports.

The construction of the airport meant the demolition of Hanlan's Point Stadium, 54 cottages, boardwalk, the Hanlan's Point Amusement Park attractions and the regatta course. The remaining cottages and cottagers were moved to today's Algonquin Island (then named Sunfish Island). Construction used dredges to suck approximately 1,300,000 cu yd (990,000 m^{3}) from Toronto Harbour to provide the land needed for two 3,000 ft (910 m) runways. The seaplane base saw its first use in 1938. The paved runways and the terminal building opened in 1939. The first landing was on February 4, 1939; a private plane owned and piloted by millionaire H. F. MacLean. In April 1939, Toronto Council voted to name the airport Port George VI Island Airport. to commemorate an upcoming visit by King George VI in May 1939. The first commercial passenger flight to the airport was a charter flight carrying Tommy Dorsey and his swing band for a two-day engagement at the Canadian National Exhibition on September 8, 1939 operated by a Douglas DC-3. It was also the first airliner from the United States to arrive in Toronto. Takeoffs and landings for 1939 totalled 7,252.

In parallel, the Harbour Commission built Malton Airport airfield, and opened it in 1939. Before its completion, Toronto City Council made arrangements for the Government of Canada to take over the field, which was christened Bishop Field (to honour the same flying ace for which the island airport was later renamed after) in 1939. The Malton field was intended to be used for training, as the centre for the trans-Canada air system, and used when visibility was poor at the island. Trans-Canada Airlines inaugurated passenger service at Malton and ultimately rejected the island airport due to its short runways. Malton ultimately became Toronto's main airport instead of the island airport.

Instead of the tunnel, ferry service was inaugurated across the narrow Western Gap channel in the spring of 1939. The first ferry service was a cable ferry, which was rated to carry 48 persons. The cable ferry was constructed by the Harbour Commission at its yard at the Keating Channel. It was attached by two cables, one to either dock. One cable was reeled in, while the other was let out. The cable was dropped to the bottom to let shipping pass. When high waves occurred from storms or wind, the ferry went out of service. Attached by a rope, the ferry was allowed to drift out into the channel to avoid battering itself against the dock. The boat was 'marooned' for two days when the Hurricane Hazel storm arrived in 1954.

=== 1940s ===
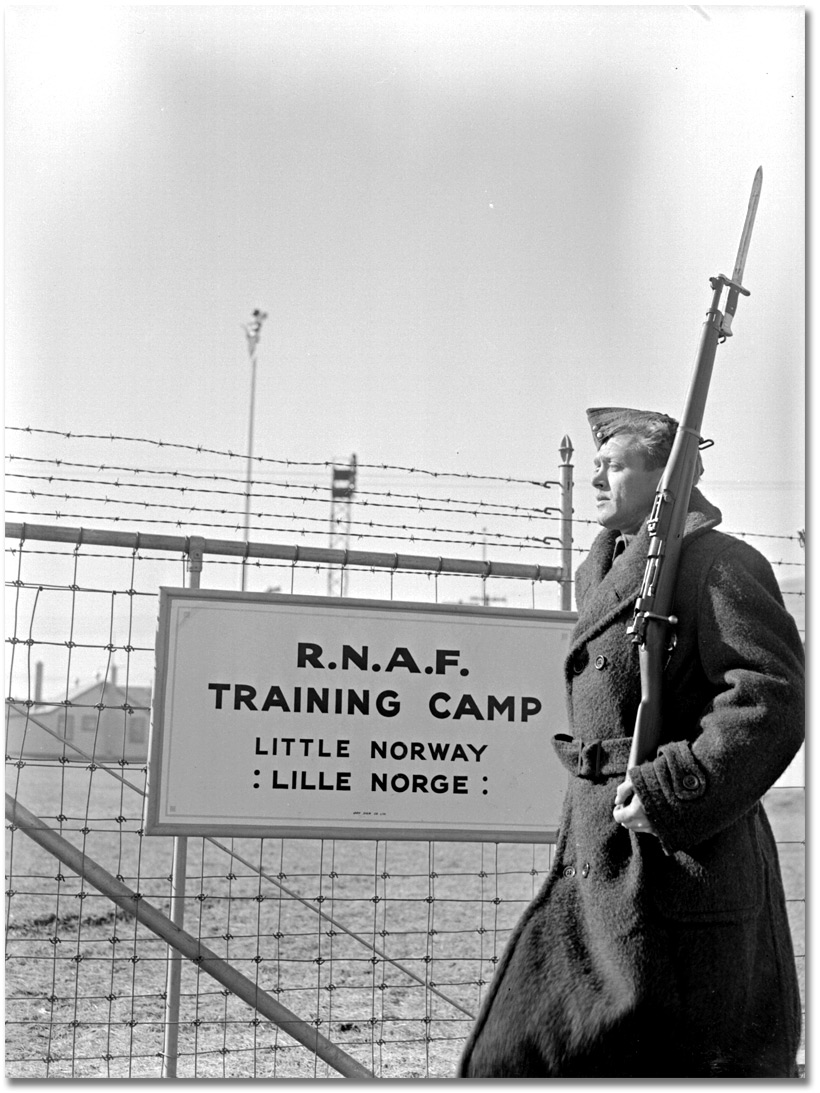
The era of the Norwegian Air Force at the airport

During World War II, many government facilities were used for military purposes, and the island airport became a military training base. In 1940, the Norwegian Government in-exile made arrangements to use the island airport as a training facility for the Royal Norwegian Air Force (RNAF), using airplanes ordered from the United States prior to war breaking out. The facility was named "Little Norway". Barracks were built nearby on the mainland at the foot of Bathurst Street. In 1943, the Norwegians moved to an existing camp at Muskoka, Ontario for their training. The barracks became emergency housing after the war, and were eventually demolished in 1957. The nearby 'Little Norway Park' is named in remembrance of the Norwegian community around the airport. The airport was turned over to the Royal Canadian Air Force for the duration of the war. It was the headquarters for No. 1 Training Command, training pilots on Harvard trainers. It was also used by 124 Ferry Squadron as a waypoint for transporting planes around the country.

In 1941, Frederick J. Conboy, a long-time proponent of the island airport, became Toronto mayor. He wrote to the U.S. Civil Aeronautics Authority, seeking approval of a Toronto–Buffalo–New York City route to use the island airport. Trans-Canada Air Lines service from Toronto non-stop to New York City had been announced in December 1940, but it had rejected using the island airport until runways were extended to 4,000 feet (1,200 m). Conboy then sought to get the Government of Canada to do the runway extension work. In 1942, Conboy met with Transport Minister C. D. Howe and offered to transfer Malton permanently to Government of Canada possession in exchange for improvements at the island airport, including the runway extension, estimated to cost $1 million to implement.

By 1944, Trans-Canada Air Lines president H. J. Symington forecast the development of four-engine planes, and that upgrading the island airport for four-engine passenger planes was "an impossibility." Newly elected mayor R. H. Saunders met with Howe in 1945 to discuss the plans for Toronto's future main airport, which would be either Malton or Downsview. Howe envisioned that the Government of Canada would finish the work at the island airport, extending the runways to 5,500 feet (1,700 m) and 6,000 feet (1,800 m) as a "post-war measure".

After the war, the airport returned to civilian uses. Two flying clubs were set up at the airport. Several aviation companies set up at the airport. Companies such as Community Air Services, Central Airways, Inter-Provincial Air Services, Lome Airways, Nickel Belt Airways and Taylor Airways offered services such as aircraft rentals, air freight, charter flights, pilot training and sight-seeing flights. Civilian pilots were much in demand after the war, and the Government of Canada offered a grant of $100 ($1346 in 2025 dollars) to anyone who passed their pilot's licence, an amount to offset the $355 ($4778 in 2025 dollars) Lome charged for pilot training in 1949. The return to civilian use led to a big jump in traffic at the airport, from 3,719 flights in 1945 to 13,031 in 1946.

=== 1950s-1960s ===
In 1951, the Harbour Commission proposed a plan to modify the Toronto Islands, including a new tunnel under the Western Gap. A new highway would connect to the tunnel and run the length of the island, and bridge the Eastern Gap channel. The highway would remove the need for the ferry service and bus service on the island, which was costing the City $100,000 per year. Under the plan, the airport's runways would be extended, a new regatta course would be built, amusements would be moved from the Sunnyside Amusement Park to the island and apartment buildings would be built. The plan would mean the filling of various channels and expanding the land mass of the islands. The project came with no price tag and was sent back to the THC for further study. The city hoped to persuade the Government of Canada to pay for the tunnel.

By the end of 1952, the accumulated cost of running the Island Airport, and paying the interest on the debt of construction, totalled $752,000. ($8.7 million in 2025 dollars) Toronto Mayor Allan A. Lamport, one of the original supporters in 1937 of building the Island Airport, began a renewed effort, along with the Harbour Commission to expand the airport, hoping to make it profitable. He once again pushed for a deal to turn over Malton Airport to the Government of Canada in exchange for improvements at the Island. He faced opposition from Alderman and future Toronto mayor William Dennison, who thought the deal was a mistake as it swapped "our $5,000,000 Malton Airport" for improvements at the Island, which he considered a "lemon" and a "private garage for Bay St. businessmen." The Government of Canada was amenable to the deal, and expanding the Island Airport, and installed an air traffic control system in 1953, but no comprehensive agreement was yet made. Agreement was reached in July 1955, but an impasse arose between Toronto and Ottawa over the terms of the agreement. The City of Toronto wanted the estimates of the spending to be done at the Island, before it would turn over its title. The Government of Canada wanted the title before giving its estimates and committing to the spending at Malton. The Government of Canada planned to spend $22 million at Malton for new runways and a new terminal, and $3 million at the Island, including extend a runway, an air traffic control tower, and a new hangar. The impasse was finally settled in 1957. Dredging of the Western Gap was needed to lower the depth of the channel for the soon-to-open St. Lawrence Seaway and the dredged materials would be used to expand the area of the airport for the extended runway. Dredging began in 1958, the runway construction began in 1959 and was finished in 1960.

By 1956, takeoffs and landings at the Island reached 130,000 per year, many of them private flights to Muskoka and Haliburton Other flights included a daily return flight to the race track at Fort Erie, Ontario for horsemen and gamblers offered by Central Airways. Takeoffs and landings in 1957 totalled 144,000, ranking the Island Airport the sixth-busiest airport in Canada. In July 1960, the airport recorded its millionth movement (take-off or landing) since air traffic control was installed in 1953. At the time, it was estimated that the airport was the home base for 90 aircraft. Operators at the time included 20 planes by Central Airways Limited, five by Airgo Limited and three by the Ontario Department of Lands and Forests. The rest were private and corporate aircraft.

The Toronto Flying Club moved to the Island from Malton in 1960 and this caused a large increase in traffic. For 1961, the airport recorded 212,735 movements, of which 168,272 were for local traffic, including student flights. By number of movements, this made the airport the busiest in Canada. However, the cost of operating at the Island airport forced the club to close and sell off its 12 planes after less than a year. It would resurrect itself at Malton two years later in 1963.

In 1962, the operations of the airport was re-organized. The airport was leased to the Harbour Commission for 21 years, and THC assumed financial responsibility for the airport. THC now operated the airport as principals, not as agents for the City of Toronto.

The airport improvements, including a new hangar, the new 4,000 ft (1,219 m) main runway, and night-time landing lights, were completed in 1962. The new lights allowed the first use of the airport for night-time flights since World War II when Norwegian flyers practiced night-time flights. Night-time flights began officially on April 15, 1963, and the airport extended its closing hour to midnight, after closing one half-hour before sun-down previously. The Government of Canada spent $3,118,500 on the improvements. ($31.8 million in 2025 dollars)

The cable ferry was retired on December 31, 1963. It was first replaced by the Harbour Commission tugboat Thomas Langton. The tugboat was later replaced by the Maple City ferry in March 1965. The ferry was purchased from the city of Ogdensburg, New York and refitted by the Harbour Commission. The ferry was previously used to traverse the St. Lawrence River between Prescott, Ontario and Ogdensburg. The THC bought the boat, its docking ramps and refitted the boat at a total cost of $144,000. ($1.41 million in 2025 dollars)

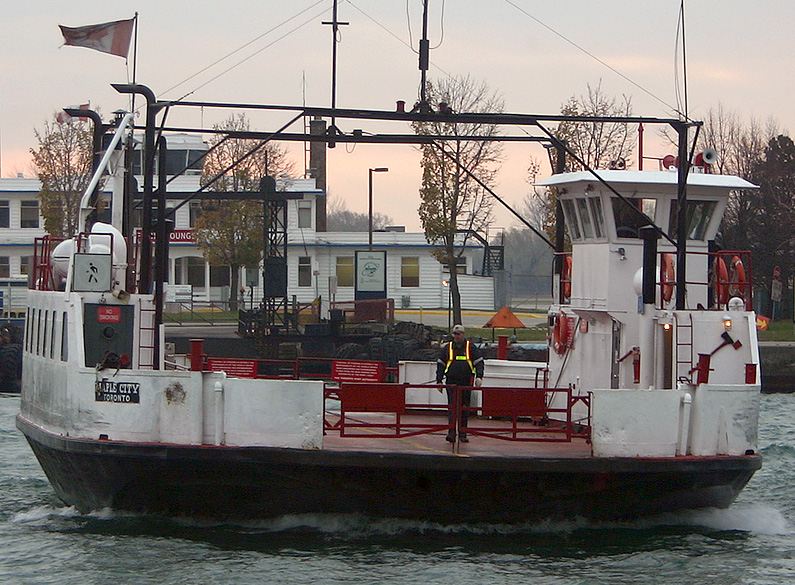
The old Maple City ferry, which operated for over 40 years.

In 1964, interest by municipal government officials was renewed in a new link to the airport. Takeoffs and landings had declined from the 1961 peak to 189,000 in 1962 and 187,000 in 1963, despite the addition of night-time capability. Some decline was attributed to the limited access and poor service the cable ferry provided, and part to the opening of the Buttonville Municipal Airport north of the city in Markham, Ontario in 1962. The City of Toronto, spurred by Allan Lamport, wanted the Government of Canada to provide a better ferry, or a lift bridge. The Metropolitan Toronto (Metro) planning department began studying a proposal to build a bridge, although full automobile access was opposed by the Commissioner of Parks, Tommy Thompson, whose department was clearing the islands of residents to create recreational land.

In 1967, the Harbour Commission initiated a study into converting the airport into one suitable for the passenger jets of the day, such as DC-8s. The island airport runways would be too short for jets, so a new airport would have to be built on new land reclaimed from Lake Ontario. The Commission developed this further into a full redevelopment of the Islands, whereby a residential development, entitled Harbor City would be built on the existing island airport lands, and a new airport with a runway long enough for jets would be built on a peninsula parallel to the south shore of the Toronto island. The sale of the residential units would provide the funds to develop the islands as a whole. This plan, unveiled in 1968, was developed in conjunction with Metropolitan Toronto's Planning Board. This plan also outlined the development of a new harbour, the Outer Harbour east of the Eastern Gap. The plan was later modified to situate the new Island Airport on the Outer Harbour headland, east of the Islands, with road access available from the Gardiner Expressway south along Leslie Street. Although the plan was approved by Metropolitan Toronto and the Government of Ontario, the Government of Canada ruled out the waterfront site for a major airport early in 1970, although Transport Minister Donald Jamieson suggested there would be some sort of expanded airport serving "short-hop, inter-city" flights created. Of the complete project, only the Outer Harbour and its headland was constructed. The Outer Harbour is currently the site of a marina and a bird sanctuary.

=== 1970s-1980s ===
By 1970, the annual operating deficit (the cost of operating the airport minus revenues collected) of the airport had reached $200,000. ($1.62 million in 2025 dollars) Mayor Dennison warned that the airport could close as the Harbour Commission did not want to absorb the amount. At the time, the island airport site was slated to be the site of the Harbor City residential development, although a replacement for the island airport had not been agreed upon. A 1969 proposal to build a new airport by the new headland was met with opposition from local residents and Toronto City Councillors and dropped. With plans uncertain, the Government of Canada requested the Harbour Commission to continue to operate the airport as is in the interim.

In 1972, the Harbor City project died when the governments of Canada and Ontario proposed to build a new major airport in Pickering, Ontario. At the same time, the Government of Canada initiated a feasibility study of converting the island airport to a major airport for Short Takeoff and Landing (STOL) planes. Later that year, the Harbour Commission announced plans for an aquatic park on the Outer Harbour headland, the location in the 1968 plan for the relocated island airport.

In 1973, de Havilland Aircraft of Canada, makers of the new DHC-7 (Dash 7) STOL plane, proposed a network of STOL airports around Ontario, with the Island Airport as its hub, to the Government of Ontario cabinet ministers and the Government of Canada cabinet ministers. The first versions of the Dash 7 could support flights from the Island to smaller centres, such as Sarnia, Kingston, Peterborough and Owen Sound, with a larger version able to support flights to larger centres such as London, North Bay, Ottawa and Windsor. The island airport, which operated under visual flight rules, would have to be upgraded to instrument flight rules to operate the service. De Havilland also proposed a bridge to the island airport over the Western Gap. The Government of Ontario was interested in the proposal, and asked the Canadian government to work towards development of STOL. Ontario Intergovernmental Minister John White characterized "regional air service in southern Ontario as totally deficient."

In 1974, the debate over the waterfront airport intensified. That year, a joint committee of the Toronto, Metro, Ontario and Canadian governments, with representatives of the Toronto Board of Trade and the Ontario Aviation Council was set up to study the possible future of a STOL airport. It was revealed by Ontario Liberal Leader Bob Nixon, and admitted by Ontario government transport and communications minister John Rhodes, that the Ontario and Canadian governments were planning in secret to resurrect the second airport, on the location of the Outer Harbour headland. The proposed new airport was designed to separate the two types of airport traffic, that of the STOL planes and general aviation between the two airports, which landed at two different angles of descent. The secret plan infuriated Toronto committee member Dorothy Thomas and resurrected local residents' opposition. The City of Toronto Planning Board released a report critical of the STOL airport at the island, stating that the need was not justified.

The annual operating deficit of running the airport had reached $300,000 per year, $130,000 of it in operating the Maple City ferry. The City of Toronto decided to ask the Government of Ontario and the Government of Canada to cover the deficit. Despite the deficit, and in the absence of a subsidy, the joint committee studying the airport recommended to the Harbour Commission to keep it open. The report outlined three options: keep it open as is, closing it and use the land for other uses (which would mean finding a location for the 140,000 takeoffs and landings elsewhere), or use it for a STOL airport. The Government of Canada agreed to grant an annual subsidy to the Harbour Commission to operate the airport, while the Government of Ontario agreed to pay for the costs of the airport ferry. The Government of Canada put a condition on the subsidy, that intergovernmental agreement needed to be reached on the future of the airport.

In January 1975, Otonabee Airways of Peterborough, Ontario started a three-times a day service between the island airport and Montreal's international airport. Flights cost $38 one-way and included a stop in Peterborough. The trip between Toronto and Montreal took two-and-a-half hours. Otonabee operated a Saunders ST-27 twin-engine propeller plane on the route. The plane could carry 19 passengers in a two-seat-per-row configuration with a single aisle between the seats. From downtown-to-downtown, the trip took 15 minutes longer than one using commercial jets between Malton and Montreal, which also required the trip to Malton from downtown by bus, while Otonabee's service used a free mini-bus from downtown to the island airport. 1975 was also the year that the island airport was used as the base for Olga, a Sikorsky S-64 Skycrane helicopter used to dismantle the crane of the new CN Tower under construction and hoist sections of its new antenna into place on top of its concrete tower.

Agreement on the future of the airport would take several years. The joint committee struck to examine the future of the airport was split. While the Government of Metro Toronto (Metro), the Government of Ontario and the Government of Canada proposed to add STOL scheduled airlines to the facility, this was opposed by the City of Toronto. The City of Toronto members of the committee studied measures to close the airport and use the site for housing, parks or recreation. Local Liberal Member of Parliament Bob Kaplan, who represented the riding in North York where the Government of Canada-owned de Havilland factory was located, was championing the idea of the island airport as the base for a network of airports serving STOL planes. Several board members of the THC, including its chairman, former Toronto councillor Karl Jaffary, were opposed to the continuation of the island airport, which forced the THC to sell land to pay for the annual deficit. A 1976 Toronto Board of Trade poll of its members found that 93% of respondents favoured the retention of the airport, and 75% of respondents favoured the expansion of the airport facilitate STOL usage. The study found that recreational and civil aviation was the most supported option, although starting STOL service was "an opportunity that should be utilized."

In April 1978 then-Transport Minister Otto Lang announced at a speech to the Board of Trade a plan to provide daily scheduled airline service between the airport and Ottawa and Montreal, using de Havilland Dash 7 STOL planes. The Government of Canada would invest $5 million in improvements at the airport including a covered moving pedestrian sidewalk linking the airport with Lake Shore Boulevard. Great Lakes Airlines proposed buying seven Dash 7s on the condition that the government subsidize the service at a rate of $8 million per year for the first three or four years. Lang stipulated that the plan would have to win local approval, and conceded that it may not be profitable before 1990. Local proponents at the time were the Toronto Board of Trade and unionized workers at the de Havilland plant in North York. Toronto City Council, notably Alderman Pat Sheppard, representing local residents of the airport, opposed the airport. Even several commissioners of the Harbour Commission, including Roy Merrens and Karl Jaffary opposed the plan. In August, Toronto City Council voted 16–6 against the STOL proposal and proposed planning amendments to prevent any STOL development. It meant the end, at least temporarily, for Lang's proposal.

Later in 1978, councillor John Sewell, an airport opponent, won the Toronto mayoral election. During his mayoralty, another firm Canavia Transit of Montreal, proposed to set up a STOL service using Dash 7 planes and build a tunnel to the airport. Canavia's application to the Canadian Transport Commission (CTC) did not require Toronto approval, but Sewell and Council made its opposition clear to the Government of Canada, asking that it block the application, which it refused to do. While the City of Toronto opposed the STOL plan on concerns about noise and the environment, and doubted its economic feasibility, the Government of Ontario supported the proposal. Toronto MPP David Stollery, member for Toronto-Spadina, also came out against the airport, suggesting the STOL service be set up at Downsview Airport, which was situated at the end of the Yonge-University-Spadina subway line. Former councillor David Paul Smith, whom Sewell had defeated in the 1978, organized a lobbying campaign, supported by deHavilland and the Board of Trade, to convince Metro Toronto Council to support the STOL plan.

By 1980, the CTC was asked to rule on five companies interested in operating the STOL service (Atonabee (as Otonabee Airways had been renamed in 1980), Bradley Air Services, Canavia Transit, City Centre and Dash Airlines). A federal election had taken place and the new Government of Canada decided not to fund necessary improvements to the airport without contributions from the Ontario and Toronto governments. On October 18, 1980, the CTC turned down the plan, citing Toronto's opposition, and the Government of Canada's refusal to fund the improvements. "These uncertainties constitute impediments of sufficient magnitude, that, for the time being, it is not in the public interest that we issue to any of the applicants the licence they have sought." Meanwhile, in May, Atonabee had begun daily flights between the island and Ottawa's international airport using its existing Saunders planes.

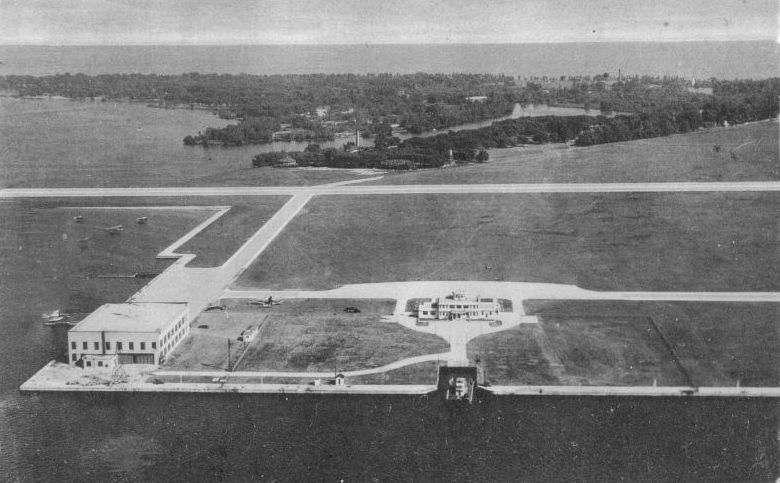
The airport and the islands in 1944.

Although the plan had been stopped, the battle was not over. A mayoral election was held later that year and Sewell narrowly lost his bid for re-election to Art Eggleton, who supported the STOL plan for the island airport. Another federal election had been held, bringing back the Liberal federal government defeated in 1979. New transport minister Jean-Luc Pepin announced a willingness to rescind the position whereby other government contributions were required. Not long after election, Eggleton met with representatives of the Government of Canada, Ontario and Metro where he outlined the conditions for his support: that only light planes such as the Dash 7 be used; no expansion of the airport; and no government subsidies. In exchange for those conditions, he would get City Council to change its position. On February 12, 1981, City Council approved a motion stating it was "not unalterably opposed to a limited STOL operation" 14–9. Council's conditions on the service included a ban on jets; no runway expansion; no bridge or tunnel to the airport; and careful regulation on flight paths, takeoffs and landings would be imposed. Later that year, a memorandum of understanding was signed by the THC, the City and Transport Canada.

Of the five applicants, Dash Air had dropped out and in August, the CTC selected City Centre Airways to operate Dash 7 planes between the island, Ottawa and Montreal. City Centre immediately got into a dispute with the Government of Canada. Canada expected City Centre to pay for the Victoria STOLport in Montreal, which meant building a terminal and improving the runways at an estimated cost of $5 million, while Canada would pay for navigational aids. Victoria (a former parking lot for Expo 67) had been used in trials of STOL service between Ottawa and Montreal several years earlier. Two of the failed applicants, Bradley and Canavia, sought to overturn the decision in different appeals. An additional difficulty for City Centre was the high interest rates at the time, 21.5%, and City Centre had expected to finance three-quarters of the startup cost.

While STOL was not yet operating, Voyageur Airways had quietly begun operating scheduled service between the island and North Bay, Ontario using 19-seat turbo-prop airplanes in November 1980. In September 1981, Voyageur began offering scheduled service to Sudbury, Ontario. The 1981 year saw an increase in traffic at the airport, recording 213,795 takeoffs and landings, the highest number since 1969. The number was attributed to an increase in local traffic, including that of flight training, accounting for 153,141 of the total, and an increase in medical flights at 615. The airport continued to run a deficit, of $223,000 of the $746,000 cost of operating the airport. The Government of Canada paid the deficit.

The CTC decision to award the licence to City Centre was overturned on appeal in March 1982. A review committee, considering the original decision, found that the funding of the STOLport in Montreal, and the ability of the applicants to pay for the port, was not addressed and overturned the decision sending back to the CTC to reconsider. In August 1982, Air Atonabee, which already had a licence to fly in the Toronto-Ottawa-Montreal triangle, announced that it would buy five Dash 8 planes, with first delivery in 1983. The CTC next approved a joint application of Canavia and City Centre Airways to operate Dash 7 planes between Toronto, Ottawa and Montreal, with the Government of Canada to spend $13.7 million to help establish the service. The service planned to be running by 1984. Metro urged Transport Canada to build a pedestrian tunnel at an estimated cost of $5.5 million, but Transport Canada put off the decision, stating that it would not decide until it saw how well the STOL service operated. In March 1983, the Canavia-City Centre consortium applied to the Government of Canada for $73.5 million in loan guarantees for the project. The firm was eventually given a $20 million loan guarantee, and the consortium made plans to fly between Toronto and Ottawa only, with service to Montreal in a future phase.

In June 1983, the operating agreement between the City of Toronto and the THC expired and a new tripartite agreement was signed between the City of Toronto, the THC, and the Government of Canada for operation of the airport. The agreement, in force from August 1, 1983, until 2033, leases the land for the airport at a rate of $1 per year. The majority of the airport land is owned by the Government of Ontario with two small sections owned by the Government of Canada and a small section owned by the City of Toronto. The agreement made provisions for a restricted list of aircraft allowed to use the airport due to noise levels, prohibitions on jet traffic except for MEDEVAC flights and prohibition against the construction of a fixed link between Toronto Island and the mainland. Executive jets were now banned and had to land at Toronto International or face a fine of $6,500. According to the 2006 Tassé report: "The Tripartite Agreement does not directly set a maximum number of flights or passengers at the Island Airport; it does, however, establish noise exposure parameters which are not to be exceeded (NEF 25), thus effectively providing restrictions on the number of flights." The number and type of flights are to stay within the Noise Exposure Forecast (NEF) 25 exposure level to neighbours. The agreement was amended in 1985 to specifically allow the new de Havilland Dash 8, (small 37–39 seat planes at the time) which are not considered STOL planes. 1983 was a weak year for the airport, seeing traffic drop for 298,000 takeoffs and landings to 194,000, attributed to the closing of the York Flight Training company in June 1983.

By 1984, the Canavia STOL plan using Dash-7s was still not in service, grounded due to a lack of financing. The Government of Canada was waiting for Canavia before spending on a new microwave navigation system, but committed $4 million to the airport for various improvements, such as a new sewage system and a new seawall. Canavia faced a deadline of June 30, 1984, but had not raised the capital to purchase the needed Dash 7s, and found itself unable to buy any in April 1984 until October 1984 as the DeHaviland assembly line was booked. The Government of Canada refused to extend the deadline and company president John Gilmore made a special visit to see Transport Minister Lloyd Axworthy to appeal for more time. Approaching the deadline, Axworthy gave Canavia another year to launch, but revoked the monopoly on the routes and allowed Bradley Air Services (First Air) and Air Atonabee to both purchase and operate Dash 7s on the route. Air Atonabee, sold by founder Joseph Csumrik to Victor Pappalardo and renamed City Express, purchased a Dash 7 and planned to start it on the route in August.

City Express launched its Dash 7 service on September 13, 1984. The week-day one-way fare was $74.50, $52.90 on weekends. The airline provided bus service to downtown in Toronto and in Ottawa. There were nine flights a day in each direction. In March 1985, City Express started flights between the Island and Montreal's Dorval airport using a second Dash 7. In 1985, City Express carried 150,000 passengers, triple the number of passengers from 1984. In 1986, the airport registered 150, 648 takeoffs and landings, and a total of 300,000 passengers.

Starting in 1984, the Government of Canada committed to spend a further $20 million on improvements to the airport. A new air traffic control tower was constructed at a cost of $3 million. The original 1939 tower was no longer tall enough to see over buildings to see approaches to the runways. The new tower was built to a height of 48 feet (15 m) and intended to last for 30 years of use. Other parts of the plan included an upgraded passenger terminal, two Microwave Landing Systems, expansion of the airport apron, and utilities improvements.

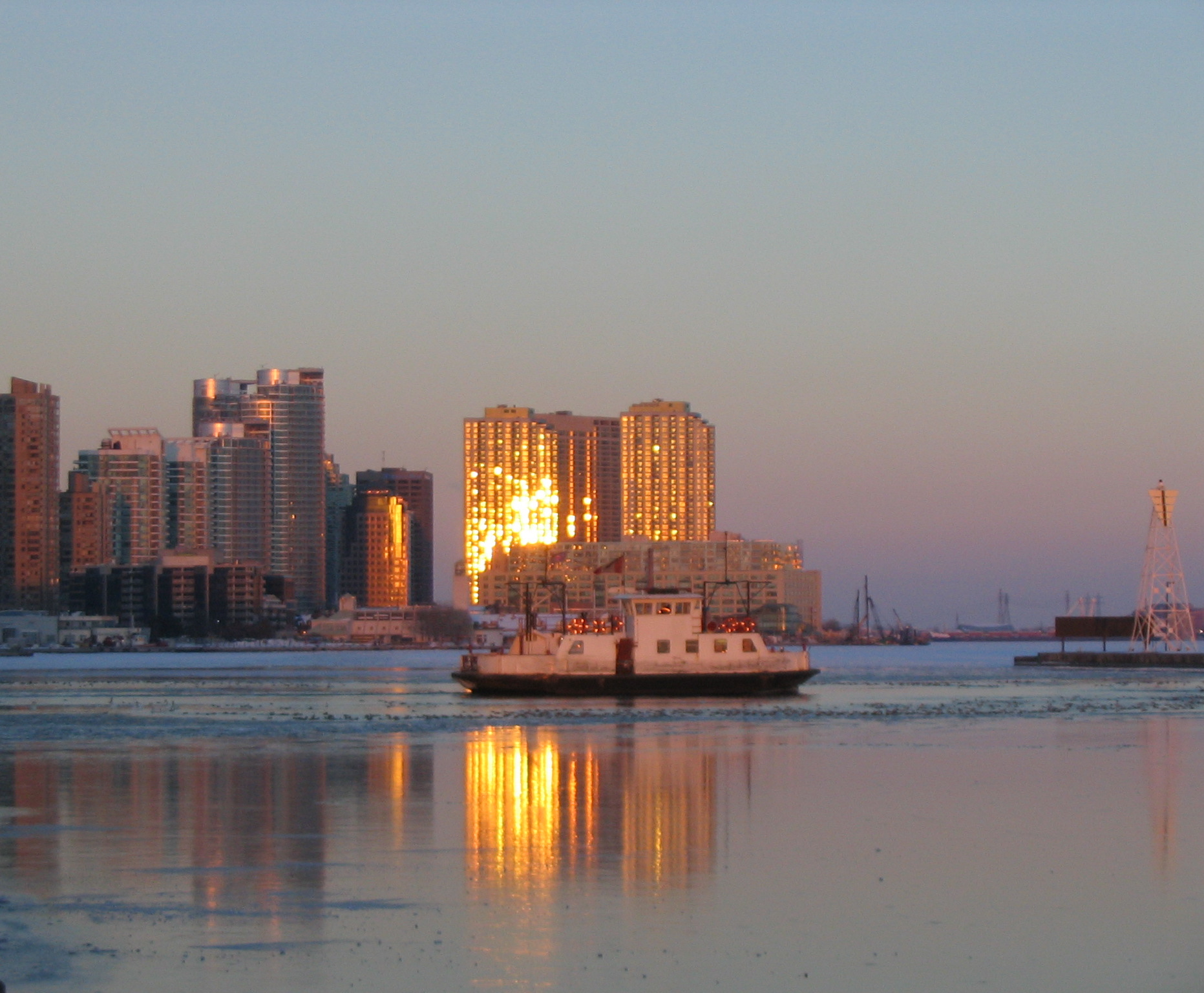
Maple City ferry transporting passengers.

The late 1980s saw the Government of Canada substantially deregulate regional airlines in a bid to increase competition and improve service. In 1986, Trillium Air started operating flights from the island to St. Catharines, Ontario to serve Niagara Falls business and tourists. The flights included a shuttle to the Brock Hotel in Niagara Falls, and customers could use the City Express shuttle from downtown in Toronto. The flights ended in October after Trillium determined it was an unprofitable service. Also in 1986, Skywalker Airlines (a division of Inter-City Airways) started a several-times-daily shuttle flight to Buffalo International Airport, and added daily flights to Rochester, New York in March 1987. City Express itself added flights to Newark, New Jersey and London, Ontario by 1987.

A plane en route to the island airport crashed in Lake Ontario in January 1987, during snow squalls. The plane sank, leaving its two occupants floating in the lake wear life jackets for an hour before rescue. The pilot died due to hypothermia, while the passenger survived. A crash inquiry was held into the circumstances of the crash. It was found that the rescue of the two occupants of the plane was delayed by communications problems in the notifications of appropriate search-and-rescue authorities. It also found, according to the airport's fire chief, that the island did not have enough fire equipment to put out a fire if a Dash 8 crashed. The revelation about the fire equipment prompted a debate at Toronto City Council about possibly closing the airport over safety concerns. Council had been assured that the airport was safe a year earlier, when the agreement to allow the Dash 8 was made with the city. The Government of Canada admitted that the island airport did not have enough fire equipment and fire-retardant foam. It only carried 650 litres of foam, when 5,500 litres was required according to the types of planes and numbers of flights occurring at the airport. The Government of Canada purchased a 6,700 litre capacity Walter 6000 firetruck and it was put into service in November 1987. 1987 saw an increase in takeoffs and landings at the airport, from 182,215 to 198,072.

April 1988 saw Skywalker end its operations at the airport. The airline attributed it to a drop in demand for the service. Connecting flights in Buffalo and Rochester had ceased to operate, giving consumers less opportunity to save on fares by using American carriers offering discount travel. Skywalker reduced flights but ultimately decided there was not enough demand. City Express started a Toronto-Rochester daily service that same month.

1988 also saw the installation of the microwave navigation system to facilitate instrument-based landings. The airport imposed restrictions on the use of the waters around the ends of the east–west runway. As the instrument rules allowed landings in reduced visibility, any boats at the ends of the runway would not be seen by passenger aircraft.

In 1989, the debate to build a tunnel to the airport heated up again. Former Toronto Mayor David Crombie was holding a Royal Commission on the future of Toronto's Waterfront. Ontario Premier David Peterson announced that the Government of Ontario, which was subsidizing the island airport service at a rate of $1 million annually, was studying a tunnel or bridge to the airport. The Toronto Board of Trade and City Express president Victor Pappalardo also wanted a tunnel and presented proposals to the commission.

At the same time, the Government of Canada told the Harbor Commission that it was cutting its subsidy of the airport. In response to the subsidy cut and a decline in annual traffic, the Harbour Commission board faced with what it saw as only two options: expand or close the airport, chose to expand the airport. In November 1989, the Harbor Commission voted to build a temporary passenger terminal and allow access to four more airlines at the airport: Air Ontario, Simo Air, Intair and Canadian Partner. The Commission planned to increase flights by 120 per day and increase the number of passengers by 500,000. It would also impose a $1.50 per user fee on the carriers to fund the improvements and cover the operating deficit. Toronto City Council voted to approve the expansion, but wanted a 90-flight per day limit. Air Ontario's president William Deluce announced it would start 14 flights a day between the island, Montreal and Ottawa. While the expansion had the approval of the harbour commission and city council, it awoke opposition to the airport from the Toronto Island Residents Association, who felt that there would be too many flights, leading to noise and air pollution and it would contravene the 1983 operating agreement.

=== 1990s ===
Airport passenger traffic declined in the 1990s. Although a new airline entered the island marketplace, City Express folded. The early 1990s saw a further decline due to an economic downturn. Additionally, the airport lost its subsidies from the province of Ontario and Government of Canada. The ending of subsidies of the airport, the Toronto Harbour Commission became dependent on subsidies from the City of Toronto. During the 1990s, the Harbour Commission transferred much of its harbour lands to the City of Toronto for economic development and waterfront revitalization in exchange for future subsidies. The land transfers deal would later be challenged by the Toronto Port Authority.

The Harbour Commission's plans to expand the usage of the airport ran into opposition at Toronto City Council, which reversed its support of the expansion and withheld a building permit for the Harbour Commission to build the new terminal. Council started a court case to stop the expansion, on the grounds that the expansion had not had an environmental assessment and violated the 1983 agreement. The Harbour Commission rented trailers to use as temporary passenger facilities. The Federal Court rejected an injunction request from the City on March 30, 1990, clearing the way for new airlines to use the airport.

On April 1, 1990, Air Ontario started operating daily flights to Ottawa and Montreal from the island. Its first flight was to Ottawa, and it carried three passengers. Air Ontario was 25% owned by the Deluce family and 75% owned by Air Canada, and its schedule was integrated to connect with Air Canada and its partners' connecting flights.

The entry of Air Ontario did not at first affect City Express, whose passenger numbers actually increased. However, in August, four of the company's planes were seized by creditors after falling behind on a debt of $43 million and the airline suspended flights temporarily before resuming two routes, Toronto-Newark and Toronto-Ottawa.

On September 4, 1990, the new passenger terminal was opened and Air Ontario moved into it. At the same time, Air Ontario inaugurated daily service to London, Ontario. A 37-seat Dash 8 operated on the Toronto-London route, while a 50-seat Dash 8 operated on the routes to Montreal and Ottawa. Air Ontario carried an estimated 7,200 passengers monthly and hoped to carry 1,100 on the new route.

The battle between the Harbour Commission and City Council continued. After losing in its application for a temporary injunction, the Council sought a compromise with the commission, to allow the terminal building, but have a moratorium on further flight increases.

City Express was petitioned into bankruptcy and ordered to develop a repayment plan for its debt. Creditors rejected City Express's proposal to exchange debt for free tickets and the airline flew its last flight on February 24, 1991. It had carried 1.5 million passengers in the past six years but had never been profitable. According to company president Pappalardo, rising fuel costs, the poor economy, fewer business travellers and the adverse publicity over the seizure of the plane were all factors in its demise. Later in 1991, Air Ontario added flights to Windsor, Ontario and Newark, New Jersey.

In 1992, the Government of Ontario moved its air ambulance base at Buttonville Municipal Airport in Markham, Ontario to the island airport, constructing a new hangar for the ambulance service's aircraft at a cost of $2 million. The move was done to provide improved access to downtown Toronto hospitals, at a saving of $150,000 per year. The uncertainty of the status of Buttonville at the time was also a factor, according to the Ontario Ministry of Health. A minor scandal would ensue when it was learned that the hangar doors were not built tall enough to accommodate the taller height of the tail of the Dash 7 as it was designed for the height of the Dash 8. In December 1992, a Dash 7 had to be diverted to Pearson airport so it could discharge its passengers. Voyageur Airways had won the contract to supply air ambulance services to the Ministry of Health although the contract specified a Dash 8 "or equivalent".

The Government of Canada's Transport Canada ministry held hearings into adding three new runways at Pearson airport. Opposition to the additional runways saw a rise in support for allowing jets at the island airport, supported notably by Metro Chairman Alan Tonks, Mississauga Mayor Hazel McCallion and several community associations of persons living near Pearson. The ministry included a review of the island airport in its study. Toronto Harbour Commission Chairman and Toronto Councillor Michael Walker openly supported the proposal and suggested that "island-based jet service would be an economic boon to the city." However, Toronto City Council rejected the proposal 9–6 on April 13, 1992, against Walker and Toronto Mayor June Rowlands' support of the proposal.

In 1992, the bridge debate arose again. In July 1992, fire, ambulance and police officials reported to Toronto City Council's land use committee that, without a bridge, it could take thirty minutes for emergency vehicles and personnel to fully respond to a crash of a fifty-person aircraft at the airport, using the ferry to transport all needed vehicles to the airport. However, the 1983 agreement banned a bridge. In October 1992, City Council approved a fixed link to the airport, and assigned planning commissioner Bob Millward to determine if a link or bridge would be required, and the associated costs, timing and approvals required. The committee reported in April 1993, suggesting a movable bridge was the best option, over a tunnel or ferries. The estimated cost of a bridge was $8 million versus over $30 million for a tunnel. Councillor John Adams, who was also a Harbour Commission member, that a fixed link would be "good for the airport and good for the economy". The number of passengers who had used the airport in 1992 was 215,000, down from 400,000 in 1987. Opponents were concerned that the safety issue was a back-door to opening the agreement to allow jets. City Council rejected the bridge proposal 10–6 on May 3, 1993. That same year, Air Ontario cancelled its route to Newark due to lack of demand.

Support for expansion of the island airport among the business community kept the idea alive. The Board of Trade of Metropolitan Toronto polled its members in 1993. Of 26 downtown firms employing 70,000 workers, over half already used the airport weekly or more frequently, 58% supported a fixed link and over 65% support the introduction of "quiet jets." In the opinion of the Board's Jim Murphy, the 1983 agreement governing the airport, banning jets and a fixed link, prevented the island airport from breaking even. If a fixed link was built and jets allowed, the airport would not only be sustainable, but profitable. The airport became an issue in the 1994 Toronto municipal election, with businessman Gerry Meinzer proposing scrapping the 1983 agreement, to allow jets to operate at the airport and a bridge to be built. In the election, Barbara Hall who opposed airport expansion was elected mayor, while Meinzer's candidacy was seen as taking away votes from Mayor June Rowlands, who also supported airport expansion and jets.

After five years in the temporary terminal, Air Ontario spent $200,000 to build a new terminal in 1994, renovating an existing building and moving out of trailers. In August 1994, Toronto City Council, the Harbour Commission and the Government of Canada approved the airport's renaming to Toronto City Centre Airport. Later that year, the Government of Canada announced it would start to phase out its subsidy of the airport in 1995 and would end its subsidy of the fire station at the airport starting in April 1995. Classic Airlines, a new charter airline, started operating at the airport, using an old 28-seater DC-3 for short and medium range flights, but it would shut down early in 1995, when its insurance premiums increased from $33,000 annually to over $100,000.

In 1995, City Express's Pappalardo returned to the island airport, as he launched the charter airline TCA Trans Capital Air using a Dash 7 airplane once used by City Express. The Province of Ontario followed the Government of Canada's lead and ended its airport subsidy, dropping the $1 million annual subsidy of the island ferry. In the 1995 provincial election, Ontario Progressive Conservative leader and premier-elect Mike Harris pledged to put jets on the island airport and expand its operations, while Liberal leader Lyn McLeod and NDP leader Bob Rae both supported letting Toronto decide.

In May 1995, Toronto City Hall hosted a two-day forum on the future of the airport, chaired by former federal cabinet minister Barbara McDougall, organized by the Canadian Urban Institute and sponsored by the Harbour Commission. In an economic paper, endorsed by Chairman Tonks, Metro Toronto advocated for expansion: "The enormous economic potential, new jobs and revenues of the (airport) must be recognized and reaped immediately," while a poll of waterfront residents by the Metropolitan Waterfront Coalition showed 75% opposition to scheduled jets. A study by Concordia University professor Judith Patterson found that introducing jets to the airport could affect air quality along the lake shore by increasing the pollutants that form smog and ground-level ozone. Emissions by a Fokker 70 jet would release 1,400 kilograms of carbon dioxide per takeoff or landing, while a Dash 8 emitted 340 kilograms. A Transport Canada study disagreed with the existing noise regulations for the airport, stating they were out of date and that jets newer than those operating in 1983 were actually quieter than the turboprops operating at the airport. Chairperson McDougall wrapped up the forum, noting that no consensus existed on the future of the airport.

The Harbour Commission appealed to City Council to allow jets and a fixed link suggesting that passenger levels would increase from the current 150,000 to over 1.2 million by 2002, turning the airport into a "money maker", while Toronto Mayor Barbara Hall requested that former mayor David Crombie report on ways to save the airport without harming the waterfront. The City Council's economic development committed began holding public hearings on the airport, hearing over 60 speakers. Backers of the expansion advocated it on economic reasons, and the idea that expansion was necessary to keep the airport open now that subsidies had ceased. Waterfront residents such as those living in the Harbourfront district and on the island, opposed the increases in noise and pollution an expansion would entail. The Harbourfront district residents suggested that the 1983 agreement should be upheld as they had bought residences in the area, based on that expectation. After 10 1/2 hours of speeches and debate, the committee voted 11–4 in favour of building a bridge to the airport paid for by the private sector and to adopt new noise standards that would allow new jets at the airport. A bridge would still require an environmental assessment. The full Toronto City Council voted against allowing jets, and voted against starting an environmental assessment for a bridge, and put off the island airport for further study.

After the decision, the Harbour Commission notified the Government of Canada that it could not continue to run the airport and asked that the Government of Canada take it over. However, the government chose to offer the airport to local interests for 90 days. If no local interest came forward, the Harbour Commission could begin to shut down the airport. The Harbour Commission cited the lack of fixed link, the ban on jets and the potential long response time to a major disaster at the airport. Tonks suggested the Greater Toronto Airports Authority agency running Pearson airport should take over the island airport as well. In September mayor Hall changed her position on the airport. Hall proposed continuing the jet ban but allow the bridge and allow modifications to the noise guidelines to allow U.S. regional airline turboprop planes to land at the airport. A few days later Hall met with federal Transport Minister Doug Young, provincial Transportation Minister Al Palladini, provincial Municipal Affairs Minister Al Leach, Tonks and the Harbour Commissioners to hammer out a deal. Jets were ruled out as, in Young's words, "city councillors appear solidly opposed".

On October 16, Toronto City Council voted 9–8 to approve the Hall plan instead of giving up the airport to provincial or federal control. The bridge to the airport was approved on condition its construction did not use City tax dollars on the bridge or its financing. An environmental assessment at first proposed a $14 million bridge along the east side of the Canada Malting Co. silos, but ultimately a bridge at the foot of Bathurst Street was chosen at a cost of $10 million.

During this same period, the Government of Canada was developing its Port Authority legislation. Transport Minister Collenette announced that a new agency would take over the responsibilities of the Harbour Commission, but without as many politician members on its board. The new agency would operate the airport, contrary to the wishes of Toronto City Council, which wished to keep the airport under city control. City Council voted to appeal to the Senate of the Parliament of Canada to try to block the legislation creating the new Toronto Port Authority. According to Councillor Olivia Chow, the new agency would get the Harbour Commission's $20 million in reserves, operate independently, while the City of Toronto would have to subsidize any losses.

As well, at this same time, the municipalities of Metropolitan Toronto were being merged. This prompted a review of projects underway. The bridge project came under renewed scrutiny under the new City Council, its $16 million cost, a narrowing of the Western Gap channel. A Council urban environment committee was reviewing an endorsement to approve changing the tripartite agreement to allow a bridge, but put off its decision to review the various concerns. New Toronto Mayor Mel Lastman wanted to scrap the bridge and build a tunnel instead. He found support from former mayor Crombie, who also supported a tunnel. The committee passed the bridge proposal 5–4 and Council approved the bridge 32–22, with the support of Lastman who changed his mind on the bridge.

In 1997, the airport carried a total of 130,000 passengers. On December 11, 1998, Commut Air/U.S. Airways Express started a service to White Plains, New York with a stop in Syracuse, New York. The service ended after a few months.

== 1999–present: Toronto Port Authority takes over as operator ==
The Toronto Port Authority (TPA) came into being on June 8, 1999, and the THC was dissolved. Unlike the previous Harbour Commission, the Port Authority used a different management structure and a different management focus. Its new board of directors contained only one City of Toronto-appointed member. The Authority was also expected to manage the port more like a business. The new authority entered into negotiations with the City of Toronto. It wanted $20 million from the city, the return of lands transferred to the city in 1994, and to be exempt from municipal property taxes, while the City wanted out from its $2.8 million annual subsidy. This would be the start of a protracted dispute that would last several years.

The TPA started a review of the airport operations by an outside consultant firm, Sypher-Mueller. In its December 2001 report, the consultant concluded that the airport "is not sustainable and will likely lead to continued financial losses." Passenger volumes had declined to 140,000 annually from a peak of 400,000 in 1987. The consultants concluded that if services were upgraded to include small jets, possibly 900,000 passengers could be carried by 2020. The report proposed a $16 million bridge and $2 million in runway upgrades.

Opposition to the airport was formalized into the Community AIR (Airport Impact Review) volunteer association in 2001, headed by activist and former councillor Allan Sparrow. It was formed by local residents to oppose expansion on the grounds of increased air and noise pollution, safety concerns and that the increase in air traffic will hamper recent government initiatives to rejuvenate the Toronto waterfront. In July 2001, at a news conference held with representatives of the Sierra Club, the David Suzuki Foundation and the Toronto Environmental Alliance, the group proposed converting the 200 acres (81 ha) airport to parkland. Community Air was and is supported by the City councillors of the area.

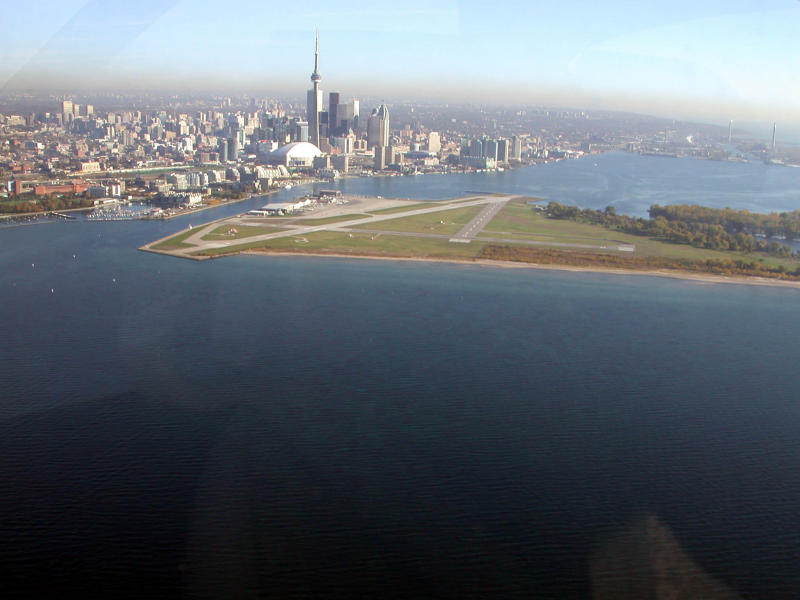
View from the southwest

It emerged during 2002, that Robert Deluce, former executive with Canada 3000, proposed to fly regional turboprop planes from the island airport. Deluce's proposal was initially conditional on the construction of a fixed link to the airport. In 2002, the TPA made plans to link the island to the mainland by a new bridge to serve expanded services.

At the same time, the TPA was pursuing a $1 billion lawsuit against the City of Toronto over some 600 acres (240 ha) of port-lands it claimed were transferred improperly to the Toronto Economic Development Corporation by the TPA's predecessor, the Toronto Harbour Commission (THC), in the early 1990s during the mayorship of June Rowlands The port-lands had been transferred under the direction of THC directors appointed by the city in exchange for a permanent subsidy of the THC under agreements made in 1991 and 1994. The lands had been earmarked for waterfront revitalization by the city after the Crombie Commission. The lawsuit would emerge as a factor in the TPA's plans for expansion of the airport, and City Council support for the TPA's plans for a new bridge became conditional upon the lawsuit being dropped.

The proposal to link the airport with a bridge had been previously approved by Toronto City Council in 1995 and 1998, with the proviso that a business plan would be presented for approval by the THC and later the TPA for operating the airport. In November 2002, City Council met to debate the competing proposals, that of closing the airport in favour of some parkland, or of approving the TPA's plans and having uncontested title to the port lands. Despite pleas from former mayor David Crombie, urban planner/activist Jane Jacobs and Harbourfront residents, the TPA plan was supported by then-mayor Mel Lastman, who argued that the estimated $190 million of annual economic benefit the airport would create, was too good to pass up. On November 28, 2002, Council in a day-long debate, made two votes to settle the issue. First, Council voted 32–9 to accept a settlement to end the TPA port-lands lawsuit in exchange for an immediate payment of $5.5 million and an annual subsidy of $5.5 million to the TPA until 2012. Council then voted 29–11 to approve the amendment of the tripartite agreement to permit a fixed link and the construction of a lift bridge.

The next year, a municipal election year, saw public opinion change to oppose the bridge. In October 2003, a Toronto Star poll listed 53% of residents citywide opposed the airport bridge, while 36% supported it. Bridge supporter Mel Lastman was retiring. Councillor David Miller ran for Mayor on a platform to stop the building of the bridge, a position supported by Community Air and other local community groups. Other mayoral candidates Barbara Hall and John Tory supported the bridge. Although the bridge was an election issue, and the bridge project still required two federal approvals, the TPA continued developing the project, progressing to the point that contracts were signed with major participants (including companies operating from the airport).

In November 2003, Miller was elected Mayor of Toronto with 44% of the vote. While construction workers prepared the construction site, Miller immediately started the process to cancel the bridge project, sparking threats of another lawsuit from the TPA. The incoming City Council voted 26–18 in December 2003 to withdraw its support of the bridge project and federal Transport Minister David Collenette announced that the Government of Canada would accept the council's position on the bridge and withdraw its support.

In January 2004, the Government of Canada would put approval of the project on hold, preventing its construction. Immediately, Deluce would file a $505 million lawsuit against the City of Toronto, claiming that Miller "abused his powers", by threatening councillors, had Toronto Fire Services and Toronto Hydro "interfere with the construction of a fixed link" and lobbying the Government of Canada to "withhold certain permits." The Government of Canada later transferred $35 million to the TPA in May 2005 to settle claims arising from the cancellation from Deluce, Aecon Construction and Stolport Corp. Compensation terms were not disclosed. TPA CEO (Lisa Raitt) commented "You will never hear about the bridge again." and "We have been working very hard since December of 2003 to deal with the request of the City of Toronto not to build a bridge, and we are very happy that the matter has been dealt with." New federal regulations were introduced to ban any future plans to build a fixed link to the airport. The monies from the federal settlement were used by the TPA to purchase a new, larger passenger ferry and by Deluce to renovate the airport terminal.

By 2005, the airport recorded about 68,000 flights, down from a historic high of 240,000 in 1967. The only carrier operating at the airport was Air Canada affiliate Air Canada Jazz, operating flights between Toronto and Ottawa. In 2006, Jazz lost access to terminal space at the airport and was forced out of the airport. Jazz had been leasing terminal space month-to-month from City Centre Aviation Limited (CCAL), a private company that was taken over by REGCO Holdings (owners of Porter Airlines) in 2005. On January 31, 2006, CCAL issued Jazz with a 30-day termination notice. Two days later, on February 2, the new Porter Airlines venture was announced. Jazz contacted the TPA on February 3 to find other space. However, the TPA did not have any space for Jazz to use and on February 15, 2006, Jazz announced a 'temporary' suspension of flights for the month of March. This subsequently became permanent.

Porter Airlines renovated the terminal and began regional airline service with flights to Ottawa in the fall of 2006 using Q400 series Dash 8 planes, 70-seat aircraft. Its entry into service was met by protesters who attempted to block passengers from the airport. Porter has since expanded to other destinations in Canada and the United States. The airport handled over 93,000 takeoffs and landings in 2008. To support Porter, the TPA launched the David Hornell ferry in 2006, which carries 150 passengers on its upper deck and 20 vehicles below. TheHornell replaced an older ferry, Maple City, which dated from 1964, which became the back-up. The Hornell is named after David Ernest Hornell, a Victoria Cross recipient.

In January 2009, it was announced that the TPA would purchase a second, larger ferry to support Porter's activities. The ferry was financed out of the airport improvement fee charged to passengers. The ferry had been proposed by Porter CEO Robert Deluce to the TPA's Board of Directors over the period of March–June 2008. The decision to approve the $5 million ferry precipitated a conflict-of-interest investigation of TPA director Colin Watson, who is a self-described friend of Deluce's, and who voted in a 5–4 decision to approve the ferry. Watson was cleared of the charge by the federal Ethics Commissioner Mary Dawson in June 2009. The new ferry, named the Marilyn Bell I after a naming contest, went into service on January 22, 2010.

At its annual meeting on September 3, 2009, the TPA announced that it would rename the airport after William Avery "Billy" Bishop, a Canadian First World War flying ace. The proposal drew criticism from TPA critics such as Adam Vaughan, charging "the port authority is putting together a "feel-good story" to prevent people from asking tough questions about how the island airport is governed." On November 10, 2009, after approval from Transport Canada, the TPA officially renamed the airport to Billy Bishop Toronto City Airport. It is the second airport in Canada, after Owen Sound Billy Bishop Regional Airport, to be named for Bishop. The airport continued to be listed in aeronautical publications and weather reports as Toronto City Centre Airport, until February 11, 2010.

At the 2009 TPA annual meeting, concerns were raised about landings at the airport after the 11 pm closing time. Local residents had two concerns: the late-night noise and safety. Control tower staff are not present at Bishop after 11 pm (a practice that is very common at most Canadian airports). In one specific incident in September 2008, a late Porter flight was advised by air traffic controllers to divert to Pearson, but instead landed at Bishop. For the landing, Porter was fined an undisclosed amount by the TPA. Under the airport's curfew agreement, each commercial landing outside the airport's curfew may be subject to a fine of $5,000.

In the September 17, 2009 La Presse newspaper, Air Canada president and CEO Calin Rovinescu was quoted as saying that the term of exclusivity for Porter at the airport ends in 2010 and that Air Canada is considering a return to the airport in 2010, if acceptable terms can be arranged. Later in September, Jazz chief executive officer Joseph Randell reiterated the comments stating that they intended to restore service as early as April 2010.

On October 19, 2009, the TPA published a press release indicating that other carriers were interested in using the airport and that it was accepting expressions of interest. The TPA noted that any increase in commercial traffic would be within the 1983 tripartite agreement governing usage and noise limits. In December 2009, the TPA announced that it would allow up between 42 and 92 daily landings and takeoffs at the airport, beyond the current 120 per day 'slots' allotted. The slots would be allocated by an International Air Transport Association (IATA)-accredited slot coordinator. These slots would become available after Porter's new terminal building was complete.

In 2009, the Toronto Medical Officer of Health started studying the effects of the pollution from Toronto's airports. The TPA initiated a study by the Jacobs Consultancy to examine the air pollution from the airport, as part of an environmental review of the airport's activities. In January 2010, the Toronto Board of Health started holding hearings into the health effects of the island airport, including the proposed increased traffic.

In March 2010, the opening of Porter's new terminal was met by new protests by Community Air activists protesting the increase in flights. The number of slots is contested by Community Air, which asserts that this contravenes maximums previously calculated:

- 97 by Transport Canada, in May 1998,
- 122 by the Sypher Mueller report to the TPA in 2001,
- 120 by the City of Toronto and the Tassé report, and
- 167 per airport consultant Pryde Schropp McComb in a 2005 study for Porter Airlines.

Air Canada pursued a judicial review of TPA's plans to open the airport to other airlines. The action was heard in Federal Court in July 2010, and the Court dismissed Air Canada's claims against the TPA's decisions of December 2009 and April 2010 with respect to the airport slot allocations. Continental Airlines had also been reported as having interest in setting up Canada-U.S. flights from the airport. In June 2010, Air Canada and Continental Airlines received initial approval to fly into and out of the airport. Continental was allocated 16 slots, Air Canada 30 and Porter an additional 44 slots. In October 2010, Air Canada and the TPA concluded an operating agreement, and Air Canada was to begin operating flights starting in February 2011. Air Canada began flying out of the airport on May 1, 2011. However, United Continental Holdings, (the merged Continental Airlines and United Airlines) decided not to fly out of the airport. The 16 slots previously held by United Continental Holdings were awarded to Porter in September 2011.

In January 2010, the TPA announced that it would spend $8 million CAD on upgrades to the airport. The upgrades include a new $2.3 million CAD Equipment Maintenance Building, apron paving, equipment upgrades and a noise barrier to deflect plane maintenance noise out over the lake. The expense would be recouped from the Airport Improvement Fee charged to passengers. In February 2010, Air Canada filed suit against the TPA to get access to the airport, access it had lost when Porter had evicted Jazz in 2006. On March 29, 2010, the Federal Court ruled that Air Canada would have a hearing in July 2010 of its objections to the TPA process. On March 7, 2010, the first half of the Porter's new terminal opened. The new terminal, estimated to cost $50 million CAD, was completed in early 2011. The opening of the new terminal was met by new protests by Community Air activists protesting the proposed increase in flights.

In 2011, Air Canada began flying again out of the island airport. In July 2011, an agreement was reached between the City and the Port Authority to enable construction of a pedestrian tunnel connecting the airport. Included in the agreement was the proviso that the original 1939 airport terminal building would be disassembled and moved from the airport to an undetermined location, to be turned over to a third party, at Port Authority expense. Dismantling of the building started in November 2011, with an expected move in 2012.

In 2013, Porter Airlines approached the City of Toronto with a proposal to add Bombardier CS100 jets to those allowed to operate at the airport. The jets would require an extension of the runways, and would require an amendment of the tripartite agreement, which specifically bans non-emergency use by jets. Toronto City Council chose to initiate studies with the Port Authority on the proposal. In November 2015, the newly elected Government of Canada notified Ports Toronto that it would not sign any agreement to allow jets. The City and Ports Toronto ended their studies of the proposal.

=== Dispute over payments in lieu of taxes to the City of Toronto ===
When the TPA was formed, all financial agreements with the City of Toronto and the Toronto Harbour Commission were severed. The TPA announced that it wanted to be exempt from making property tax payments to the City of Toronto, which ceased to provide a subsidy to the TPA. Agencies of the Government of Canada do not pay property taxes per se, but instead some negotiated amount to account for municipal services. For the period from 1999 until 2008, the TPA did not make payments in lieu of property tax to the City of Toronto on the Island Airport in a dispute over the amount of the payment. By 2009, the City estimated that the TPA owed $37 million in unpaid payments in lieu of property tax (PILT). The PILT payments were based on the assessed value as calculated by the Municipal Property Assessment Corporation, which assesses all property for the province of Ontario. The City and the TPA presented their case before a federal dispute resolution process. On January 26, 2009, the Dispute Advisory Panel recommended an amount of $5 million that the TPA must pay. This value was based on similar payments made by other airports, which make the payments based on passenger numbers. Pearson Airport at the time of the ruling paid 94 cents per passenger. The ruling by the panel works out to 80 cents per passenger. On February 10, 2009, the City applied for a judicial review to the Federal Court of Canada.

On November 25, 2009, the City and the TPA came to an agreement in principle to settle all outstanding legal issues. Both sides agreed to accept the other's estimate of monies owned. The city will pay $11.4 million owing on payments related to the 2002 property settlement and $380,559 owing on harbour user fees. The TPA will pay the City $6.4 million owed to resolve the dispute over the PILTs. The agreement, which was ratified by Toronto City Council, was made in conjunction with the transfer of 18 acres (7.3 ha) of land at Leslie Street and Lake Shore Boulevard for a proposed Toronto Transit Commission (TTC) light rail storage facility. Lands transferred to the City of Toronto by the Harbour Commission in the 1990s would remain in the possession of the City of Toronto.

=== Pedestrian tunnel ===
In 2009, the TPA proposed to build a $38 million pedestrian tunnel to the airport from the foot of Bathurst Street. The TPA proposed that the project be paid for in the majority from federal and provincial economic stimulus funds. Critics such as Olivia Chow and Adam Vaughan criticized the proposal as a benefit to a few privileged users and a subsidy to Porter Airlines' business. The project was not included on a City-approved list of projects submitted to the Government of Canada. On October 6, 2009, the TPA, having not yet received approval for the tunnel project, announced that it was now too late to proceed to meet the March 2011 completion date deadline condition for the project to receive federal infrastructure stimulus funds.

In January 2010, the TPA announced that it was seeking a private-sector partner to build the pedestrian tunnel. The cost was now estimated to cost $45 million CAD. The cost would be financed by a $5/flight increase in the Airport Fee paid by passengers. On July 12, 2010, the TPA announced that it intends to begin construction of the tunnel as early as 2011, after TPA conducts an environmental assessment. The tunnel will not be built on or over City of Toronto land, meaning that City approval is not required. The TPA also announced that an opinion poll conducted on behalf of the TPA suggested that "a majority (56%) of Torontonians support a pedestrian tunnel to the island airport."

The TPA concluded its environmental assessment of the project in April 2011. The TPA then short-listed three companies to respond to a request for proposals to build the tunnel. The RFP ended in October 2011. In July 2011, an agreement was reached with the City of Toronto, exchanging lands with the Port Authority, enabling the Port Authority to proceed on the pedestrian tunnel. The agreement allows the Port Authority to expand their taxi and parking space for the airport. The City of Toronto will have a water main to serve the Islands included as part of the project. In January 2012, the TPA announced that ground-breaking would take place in February 2012, with construction to take approximately two years. A consortium known as Forum Infrastructure Partners, composed of firms Arup, PCL and Technicore, will design, build, finance and maintain the tunnel, which will be free to use. In 2015, the tunnel opened to the public. The ferry still operates to shuttle vehicles, and passengers are still welcome on board.

== See also ==
- Toronto Pearson International Airport
