= Centreville, Ontario =

Centreville, Ontario may refer to several places:

- Centreville, Bruce County, Ontario
- Centreville, Elgin County, Ontario (now known as West Elgin)
- Centreville, Grey County, Ontario
- Centreville, Lennox and Addington County, Ontario
- Centreville, Oxford County, Ontario
- Centreville, Waterloo Regional Municipality, Ontario
- Centreville Amusement Park, on the Toronto Islands
