= Scarboro Beach Amusement Park =

Historic park in Toronto (1907–1925)

Coordinates: 43°40′12″N 79°17′34″W

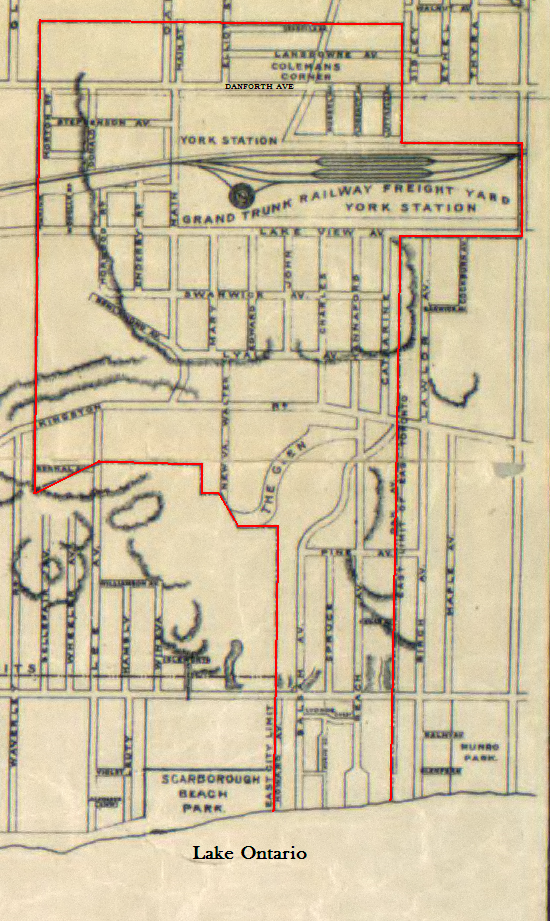
Map of East Toronto in 1908, just prior to being annexed to Toronto. showing Scarboro Beach Park on the shore of Lake Ontario.

Scarboro Beach Park was a lakeside amusement park in the Beaches, Toronto, from 1907 until 1925. The park was originally in East Toronto until its annexation by the City of Toronto in 1908.

== Location ==
The park operated on a 40-acre site south of Queen Street East to Lake Ontario between Leuty and MacLean avenues It succeeded two east end trolley parks, Victoria Park (1878–1906) and Munro Park (1896–1906), which had closed the previous year.

== History ==
The park was founded by Harry and Mabel Dorsey who purchased the site from the Sisters of St. Joseph for $165,000 in 1906. It has been the site of the Order's House of Providence farm since the 1890s. The Toronto Railway Company purchased it in 1913 and invested and expanded it as well as extending the TRC's streetcar network to reach the grounds, making it a trolley park. Previously, Toronto residents had reached the park using a steamship service from the Toronto Harbour at the foot of Yonge Street.

The amusement park was built at a cost of $600,000 and opened June 1, 1907. It was modelled on Coney Island's Luna Park and offered over a hundred attractions including various rides such as a Shoot the Chutes water ride (and lagoon), a Tunnel of Love, a roller coaster billed as a scenic train, fun houses, aerial swings, an athletic field that hosted sporting events and was the home field for a lacrosse team, and other attractions such as a freak show, daredevil acts, bathing and dance pavilions, band concerts and other features. In 1909, the park was the site of the first public flight in Canada when Charles F. Willard took off from Scarboro Beach Park on September 7, 1909.

== Closure and legacy ==
The park closed for the last time on Septebmber 12, 1925 after 19 seasons. The Toronto Railway Company's streetcar franchise with the city had ended in 1921 with the creation of the Toronto Transportation Commission. TRC sold its assets to the city in 1924 but the city refused to include the amusement park in the deal so it was purchased instead by the Provident Investment Company which demolished the park and replaced it with a residential subdivision. Scarboro Beach Boulevard in that subdivision is named after the park.

== See also ==
- Hanlan's Point Amusement Park - a similar facility operating on the Toronto Islands in the same period
- Sunnyside Amusement Park - opened in Toronto's west end in 1922
