= Centreville Amusement Park =

Canadian children's amusement park

Centreville
- Interactive map of Centreville
- Location: Toronto, Ontario, Canada
- Coordinates: 43°37′13.11″N 79°22′25.24″W
- Status: Operating
- Opened: 1967 (amusement park), 1959 (farm, public park)
- Owner: City of Toronto
- Operated by: William Beasley Enterprises Ltd.
- Slogan: It's always sunny at Centreville
- Operating season: May through September
- Website: centreisland.ca

The Centreville Amusement Park is a children's amusement park located on Centre Island, part of the Toronto Islands, offshore of Toronto, Ontario, Canada. The park has been operated by the Beasley family since 1967, currently through Etobicoke-based William Beasley Enterprises Limited, on land leased from the City of Toronto government and is open daily during the summer. Beasley also operates the "Far Enough Farm" adjacent to the park.

== History ==
Park's miniature railway

Centreville was built as part of a master plan to convert the Toronto Islands' land usage from cottage residences to recreational uses. The park replaced the old Sunnyside Amusement Park, which closed in 1955, as well as Hanlan's Point Amusement Park, which closed in the 1930s to make way for the Toronto Island Airport. The park opened in 1967, operated by Bill Beasley Sr., father of the current president of William Beasley Enterprises. The park originally had seven rides and has expanded over the years, adding one or two rides a year. The park's buildings have a 1900s turn-of-the-century village theme. An 1870s cast iron planter to commemorate Queen Victoria's birthday that was originally located in front of St. Lawrence Market is now featured in the center of the park. In 2013, Centreville took over operations of Far Enough Farm, which was threatened with closure. At the same time, the City extended its lease to 2022.

Due to flooding of many areas of the Toronto Islands, Centreville did not open in May 2017. In late June, the animals at the Centreville Far Enough Farm were moved off the island. Centreville reopened on July 31, 2017, except for the Far Enough Farm, which remained closed until 2018 due to flood damage. Three rides were unable to operate: the swan ride, bumper boat ride (due to high water levels) and the train ride (because of flood damage to the tracks). Mosquitos carrying the West Nile virus had been found on the islands but the Toronto Public Health department said that with certain precautions, visitors should not be concerned. A park spokesman said that the loss in revenue was CA$8 million due to the flood and the cost of repairs was estimated at CA$6 million.

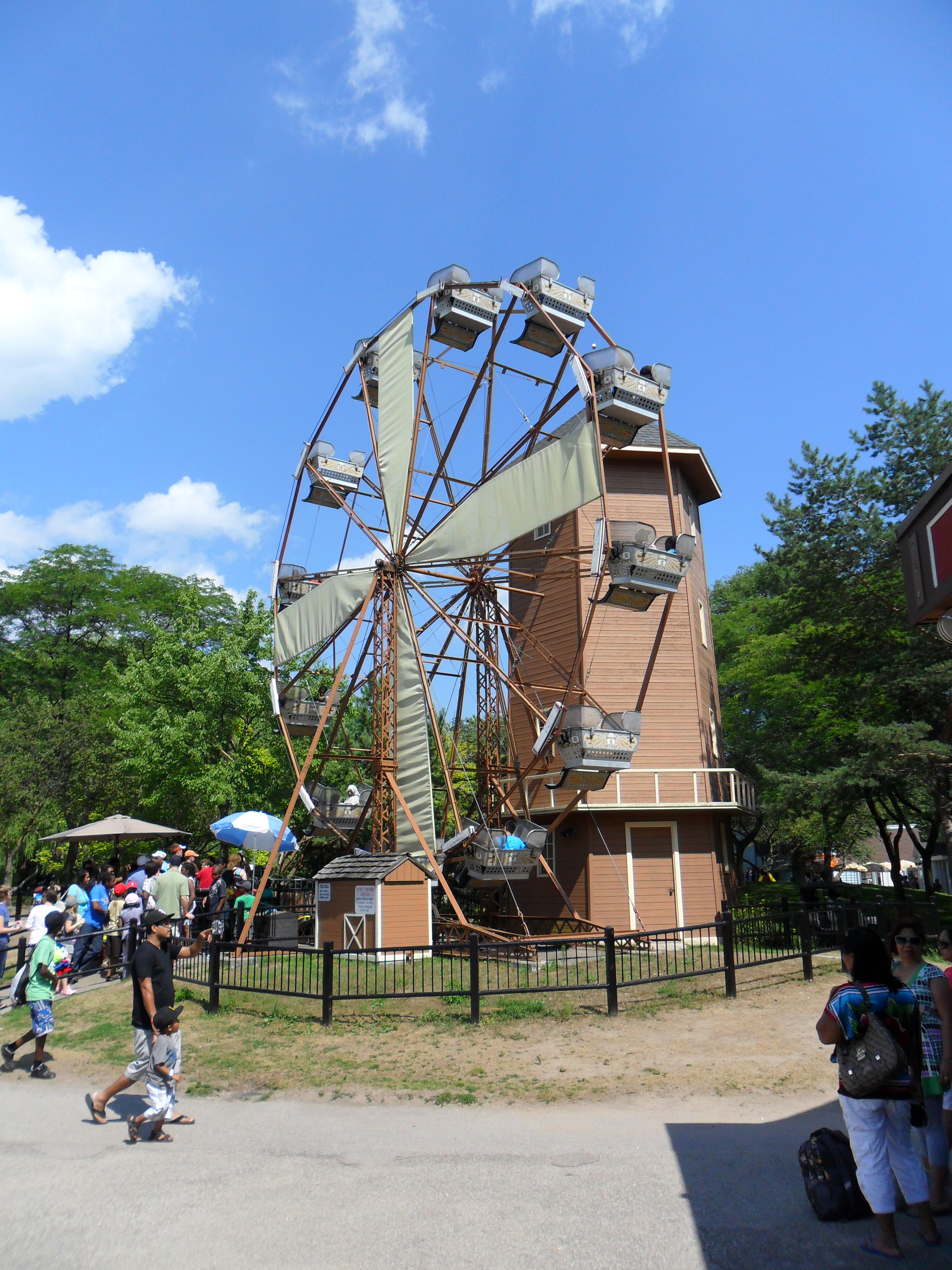
An antique ferris wheel designed to look like a windmill. It is one of several rides and park buildings that have a 1900s turn-of-the-century village theme.

In 2020, Centreville and Far Enough Farm were closed for the entire 2020 season due to the global COVID-19 (coronavirus) pandemic. Both Centreville and Far Enough Farm opened 7 days a week for the 2021 season from July 9, until September 6, 2021. This was two months later than originally planned because of earlier COVID-19 pandemic restrictions. During that operating season, Centreville installed fencing and gates around the amusement park area and charged grounds admission fees. This also applied to the adjacent Far Enough Farm as well. Individual ride tickets were not made available for that operating season and only all-day ride passes were offered for anyone going on the amusement rides. All ticket sales moved online as well and needed to be purchased in advance. The park also implemented COVID-19 screening on all visitors and reduced capacity limits.

== Admission ==
Although no general admission fee(s) is charged to enter Centreville Amusement Park and Far Enough Farm for the 2022 operating season, people are required to purchase tickets and passes - in addition to their Toronto Island Ferry Boat tickets and passes which are purchased through the city - if they wish to get on the amusement rides and to access certain attractions. Tickets and passes can be purchased at the front gates or online.

== Rides and attractions ==
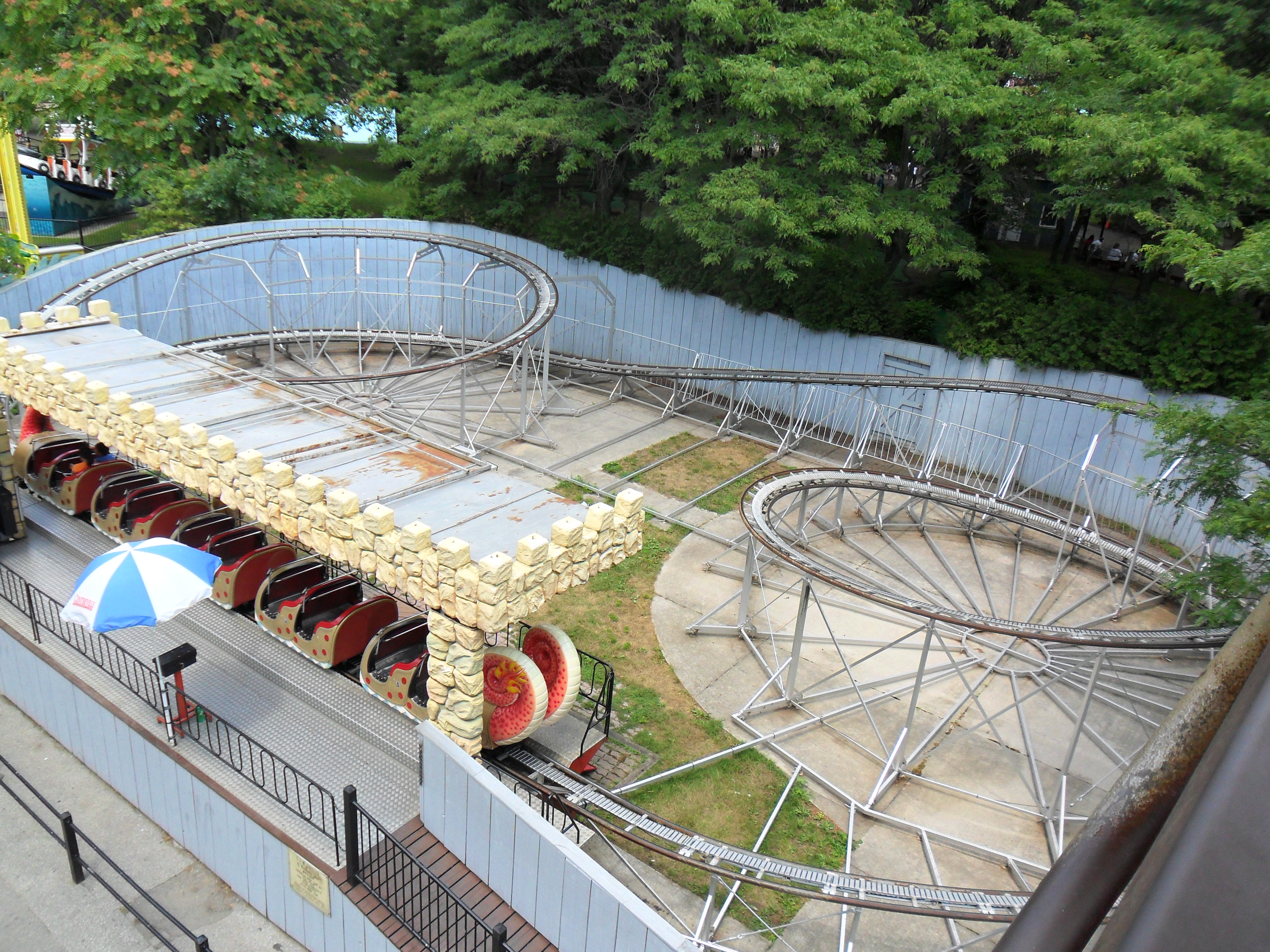
The Toronto Island Monster miniature roller coaster ride.

The rides and attractions in the park consists of a carousel, log flume, ferris wheel, 'haunted barrel works', an enclosed "Scrambler", miniature roller coaster, pleasure swan boats, bumper boats, antique-style motor cars and several kiddie rides, such as the bumble bee ride, tea cups, a swing boat, drop ride and miniature fire engines. There are several food concessions, some games and a gift shop. There is also a wading pool, pony rides and miniature golf.

A miniature train ride also operates at the park. It consists of two trains (the "Lil Red Express" and "Lil Blue Express" respectively) with five passenger cars (cars about 14 to 21 passengers) on a 2 ft (610 mm) narrow gauge track which circles the park grounds and farm and travels through a tunnel. Unfortunately due to the damage to the tracks from flooding in 2017 the trains were closed but have since reopened as of September 2024.

Centreville acquired its antique ferris wheel in 1989. It purchased the ferris wheel from Crystal Beach Amusement Park in Fort Erie, Ontario. Crystal Beach had closed that year after over one-hundred years of operation. An antique, the ferris wheel was redecorated as an old windmill. That ferris wheel was replaced with a newer model in 2015 and remains located next to the carousel.

An aerial ride, the "Sky Ride", operated for many years at the park. Installed in 1968, it was a chairlift type and carried passengers from a point near the entrance to near St. Andrew's Church and back. In 1995, a sailboat hit the Sky Ride and knocked a passenger out of her seat; she hung upside down for 45 minutes before being rescued. In 2010, a patron was injured while being loaded onto a chair, resulting in a court judgment against Beasley. The ride was subsequently closed but a new version went into operation in early August 2017.

=== Carousel ===
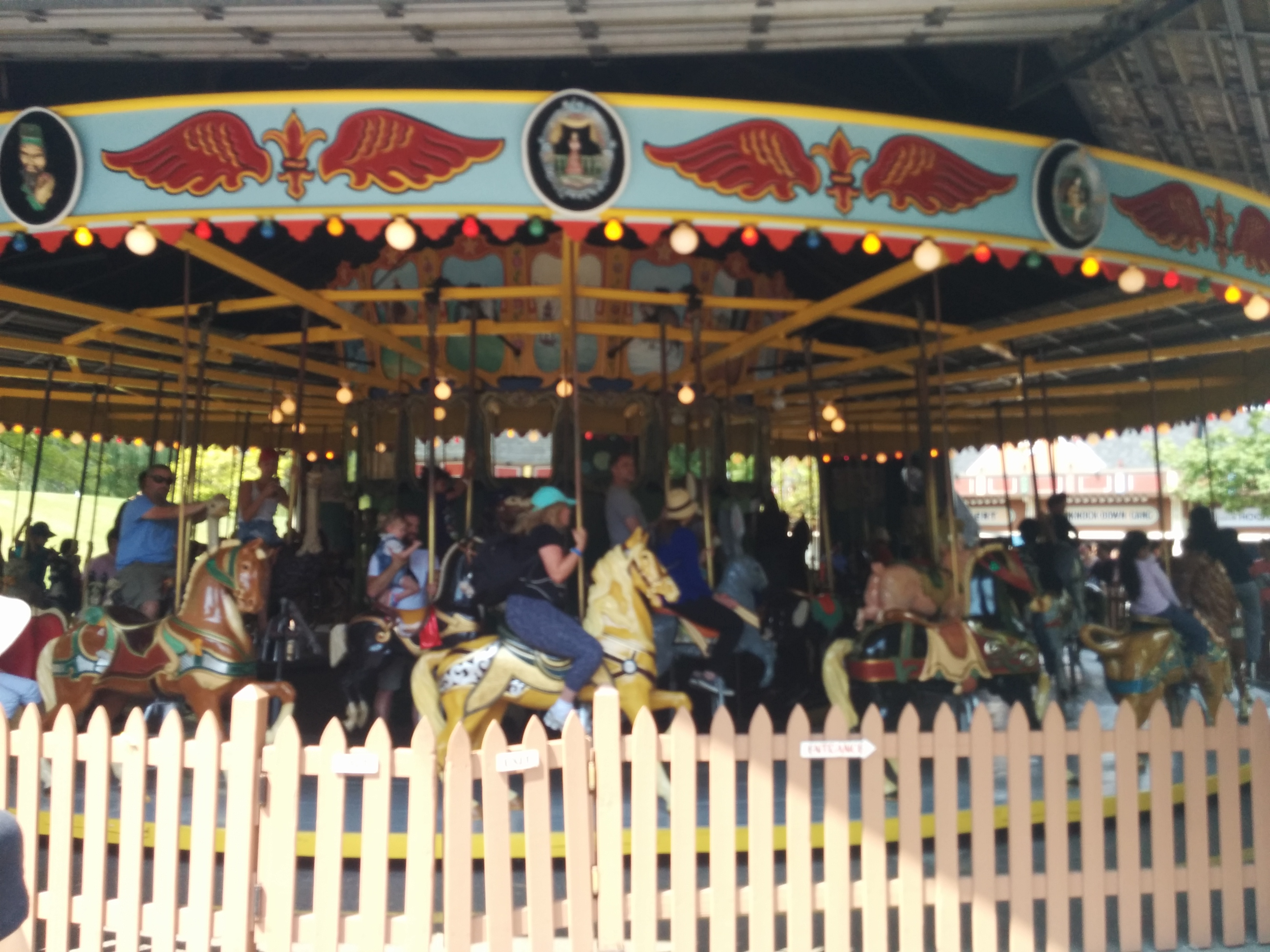
The park includes a vintage 1907-vintage carousel made by the Dentzel Carousel Company, one of 150 that remain in operation.

The park has a 1907-vintage carousel made by the Dentzel Carousel Company, one of 150 of this type that remains in operation, acquired from Bushkill Park in Easton, Pennsylvania. Its 52 hand-carved animals include cats, an ostrich, pigs, a lion and rabbits instead of the more common style consisting primarily of horses. Of the 52, 36 move up and down on brass poles. Other features include two ornate bench seats and a Welte-Mignon/Wurlitzer band organ (though the organ has been allowed to deteriorate and music is now provided by loudspeakers).

Necessitated by the park's financial losses in the summer of 2017, the carousel was conditionally sold to the city of Carmel, Indiana. The sale was due to an estimated CA$6 million loss when it was unable to open due to flooding of the area by high lake levels, according to the president of Beasley Enterprises. The estimated selling price was CA$3 million, approximately US$2.25 million. On July 31, Beasley was quoted as saying he had not yet accepted the offer and that Toronto Mayor John Tory was interested in keeping the carousel in Toronto. Beasley considered the purchase of a new carousel that would be on site at Centreville by the 2018 park season. The Dentzel carousel was expected to be shipped to Carmel in November 2017 to open in 2018 or 2019 as part of a multi-year downtown redevelopment project. An announcement on Centreville's Facebook page on July 20 indicates that the carousel would continue in operation on the island for the 2017 season. In mid-September 2017, the sale of the carousel to Carmel was in doubt after that city's finance committee recommended that this item be removed from the budget for the redevelopment plan and that Carmel City Council would vote on the proposal on September 18. On September 19, it was confirmed that Carmel was not purchasing the ride and will stay put to solicit other buyers. As of 2018 season, the ride will remain after negotiations with the city over rent and debts forgiven by Beasley's suppliers.

== Far Enough Farm ==
Also maintained by William Beasley Enterprises Limited, the Far Enough Farm exists on the eastern outskirts of the Amusement Park, just past the Toronto Island Mine Coaster Ride. The hobby farm opened in 1959 and is home to several domesticated animal species including rabbits, goats, pigs, chickens, cows and ponies as well as emus and peafowl which often freely roam around the farm. The farm is staffed by a manager with farmers and farm hands employed by Beasley and is normally open 365 days a year, except in 2017 when it closed in May and would not reopen for many months due to flood damage and in March 2020 and for many months thereafter up until July 2021 because of the COVID-19 pandemic. In the meantime, the animals were being sheltered at the family's equine facility in nearby Schomberg, Ontario.

== See also ==
- Media related to Centreville Amusement Park at Wikimedia Commons
- Ontario Place
- Sunnyside Amusement Park
- Exhibition Place
- Hanlan's Point Amusement Park, an earlier amusement park on the Toronto Islands
