= Sunnyside Amusement Park =

Former amusement park in Toronto, Canada

Coordinates: 43.637923°N 79.450786°W

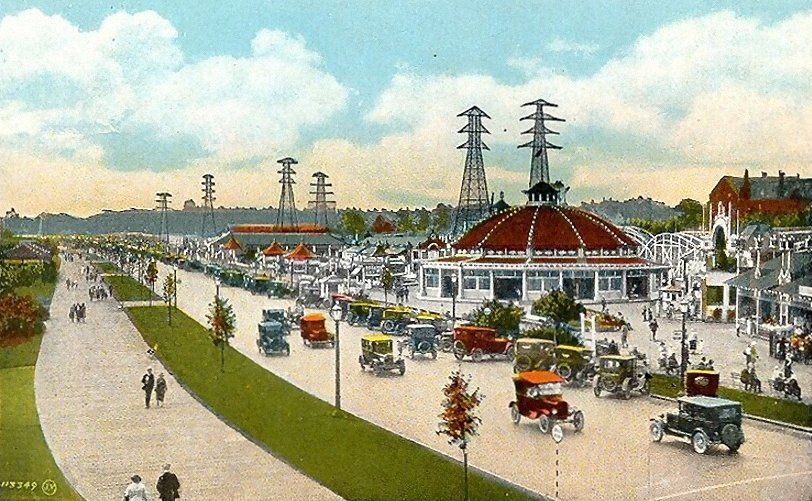
Sunnyside in 1931

Sunnyside Amusement Park (also known as Sunnyside Beach Park) was a popular amusement park in Toronto, Ontario, Canada, that ran from 1922 to 1955, demolished in 1955 to make way for the Metro Toronto Gardiner Expressway. It was located on the Lake Ontario waterfront at the foot of Roncesvalles Avenue, west of downtown Toronto.

The name 'Sunnyside' was the name of a local farm owned by John George Howard, which was situated just to the north, on the location of the current St. Joseph's Medical Centre. Sunnyside Avenue runs north–south from that location north to Howard Park Avenue today. John Howard is also famous as the original landowner of the nearby High Park.

== Construction ==
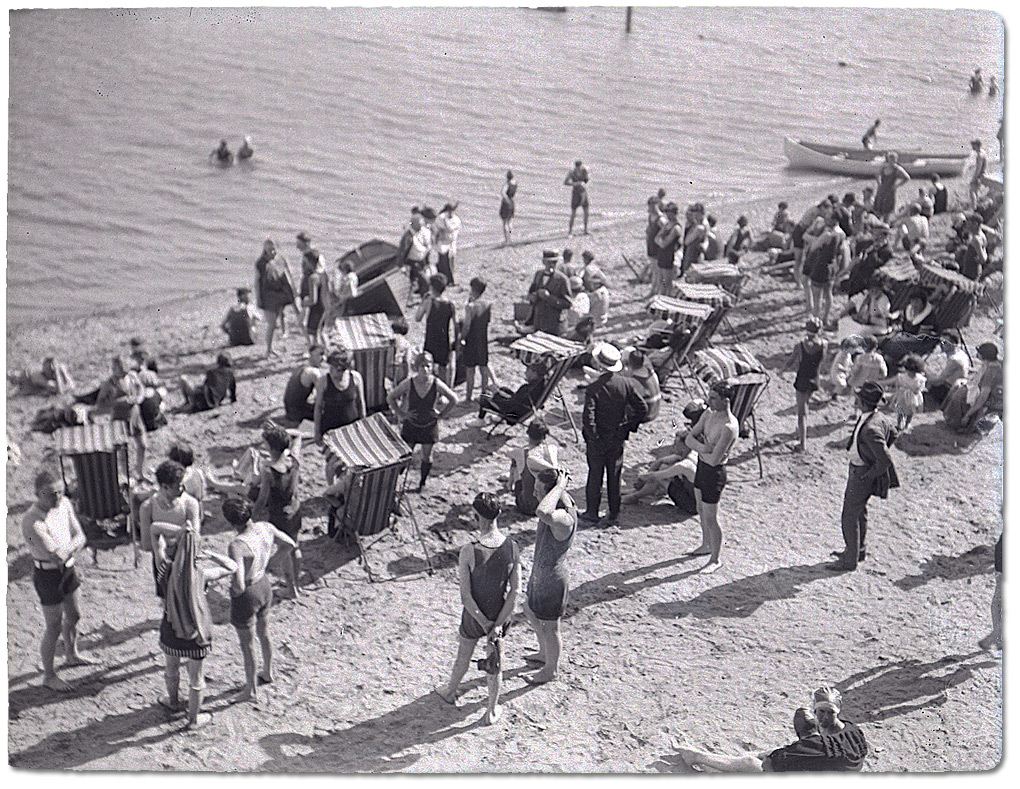
View of beach in 1924

Prior to the construction of the park, the shoreline was a narrow stretch immediately to the south of the 1850s-era rail lines. There was enough area for a restaurant and a small fenced off area was provided for changing into swimwear. To the east, the club-house of the Parkdale Canoe Club jutted out into the lake.

A plan was developed in 1913 by the new Toronto Harbour Commission to improve the shore lands from the foot of Bathurst Street to the Humber River. The plan, which included 4 mi (6.4 km) of breakwater, infilling of land, and the construction of the Lake Shore Boulevard, cost $13 million, and was paid for by the federal government.

A boardwalk along the south side of Lake Shore Boulevard was built, from the Humber River east to Wilson Park Avenue, 24 feet (7.3 m) in width using white pine planks. This corresponded to the length of shoreline that was extended out into the lake. This boardwalk became the site of annual Easter Parades until 1953. It was rebuilt in 1934 as a make-work project and was paved using asphalt in the 1960s.

The Amusement Park lands themselves were completely created from sand dredged from the bottom of the bay and top soil from a farm in Pickering, Ontario. The original shoreline was extended into the lake by approximately 100 m (330 ft), from the foot of Wilson Park Avenue west to the Humber River, a distance of about 1 km (0.62 mi). Only a small length of the original shoreline and beach exists today, located between the Boulevard Club and the Canadian Legion building at the intersection of Dowling Avenue and Lake Shore Boulevard.

One of the first new buildings was the Sunnyside Pavilion, a curved structure providing a restaurant with views of the lake. It was located just to the east of Parkside Drive at the shoreline. Following this, the Sunnyside Bathing Pavilion and Dean's Sunnyside Pleasure Boats buildings were constructed. Soon after, concessions were requested and granted to operate amusements on the lands.

Sunnyside Amusement Park opened in 1922. At the time, there was an existing amusement park, the Hanlan's Point Amusement Park on the Toronto Islands. It only operated a few more years until the mid-1930s when it was demolished to make room for the Toronto Island Airport. Another amusement park, the Scarboro Beach Amusement Park was a trolley park in the east end of Toronto that operated from 1907 until 1925.

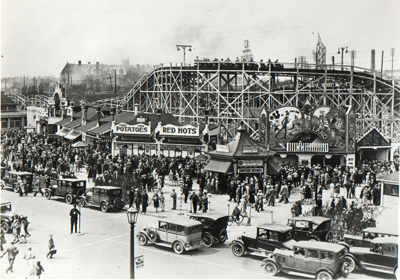
Rides in 1923

== Attractions ==
The park was popular for its large roller coaster, known as the 'Flyer', several merry-go-rounds, the Derby Racer steeplechase ride and numerous smaller attractions. It also hosted several 'stunt events' including flagpole sitting, famous boat burnings in Lake Ontario and fireworks displays. Other popular attractions included outdoor and indoor musical concerts, night clubs, and restaurants and walking along the boardwalk.

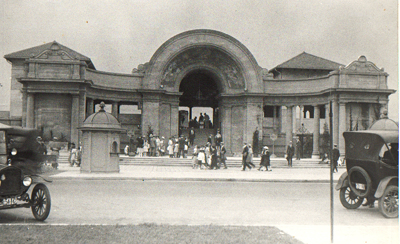
Bathing Pavilion in 1922

=== Bathing Pavilion ===
By the 1920s, swimming at the foot of Roncesvalles had been popular for over thirty years, as there was a swimming area near a pumping station. This changed in 1913 when the pumping station was demolished to make way for the bridge connecting Lakeshore Road and the King/Queen/Roncesvalles intersection. A staircase was built for pedestrians to walk down to the shoreline. A slide was installed for bathers to slide down into the water. By 1920, this area was filled in and the beach was moved further to the south.

On June 28, 1922, Toronto Mayor Charles A. Maguire opened the Sunnyside Bathing Pavilion to help bathers change for the swim in the lake. The building, constructed of concrete, cost $300,000. Each wing held an outdoor changing area, lockers and showers, the women's side on the east, and men's side on the west. It offered over 7700 lockers for patrons, a roof garden for 400. Admission fees were 25¢ for adults and 15¢ for children, and bathing suits and towels could be rented. In the center was a staircase leading to an upper terrace which overlooked the change areas leading to a rear terrace which ran the full length of the building and overlooked the beach.

On July 29, 1925, due to coldness of the lake during the preceding two summers, the Sunnyside Pool, nicknamed the 'Tank', was opened beside the Bathing Pavilion to the east. It measured 300 feet (91 m) by 75 feet (23 m) and could accommodate 2,000 swimmers. At the time of construction, the pool was considered the largest outdoor swimming pool in the world. Admission fees were 35¢ for adults, 10¢ for children.

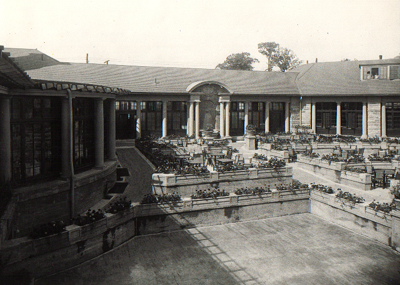
Sunnyside Pavilion and Tea Gardens, August 3, 1921

=== Sunnyside Pavilion ===
Sunnyside Pavilion provided two restaurants and a tea garden facing the lakeshore. It was curved into a crescent with the tea garden positioned within the semicircle. It was designed by the same architects and was in the same style as the Bathing Pavilion, immediately to the west.

It was built in 1917 on the south side of Lakeshore Road. When built, its south side was on the lakeshore. As infill proceeded it ended up about 50 metres from shore, on the north side of the new Lake Shore Boulevard. In 1920, the building was enlarged and a new south entrance was built facing the lake. The restaurant had the Blue Room for 400 diners/175 dancing couples, and the Rose Room for a further 300 diners/150 couples. Dancing followed supper, with music provided by the Joe DeCourcy live orchestra.

In 1936, the Pavilion was renovated and became known as the Club Esquire supper club, with stage shows and dancing.

In 1941, the building was converted into the Top Hat night club. It was demolished in 1956 to make way for the new westbound lanes of Lake Shore Boulevard.

=== Sunnyside Flyer ===
The Sunnyside Flyer roller-coaster, advertised as having the "dippiest-dips on the continent" was opened in 1923. It was designed by veteran amusement ride builder A. J. Miller, who had built most of the attractions at the prior Hanlan's Point amusement park, and had built roller coasters in North America and Blackpool, England. The coaster was redesigned in 1933 with increased height and speeds.

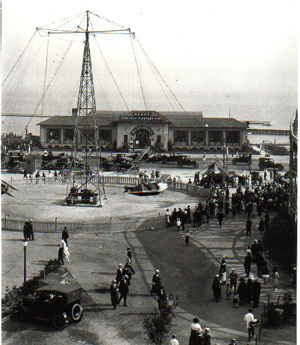
View of park showing Dean's Boats/Palais Royale at shoreline, 1923

=== Sunnyside Stadium ===
The Sunnyside Stadium softball and lacrosse field was opened on May 19, 1925, immediately to the east of the amusement park, next to the current Boulevard Club, then the Parkdale Canoe Club. It was the site of several popular women's softball leagues. It was bulldozed in 1956 for the current Boulevard Club parking lot.

=== Palais Royale/Dean's Sunnyside Pleasure Boats ===
Opening in 1922, the Palais Royale building provided a factory for Walter Dean to build his "Sunnyside Torpedo Canoe" on the lower floor, and the Palais Royale dance hall on the upper floor. The upper floor opened at ground level on the north, and the land sloped downwards to the lake shore line, where the lower level opened onto the lake. The factory also rented canoes and rowboats. Dean had been building boats in a nearby building that was demolished to build the amusement park and the Harbour Commission built the new building, which cost $80,000. The boatbuilding business ended not long after the opening of the amusement park, and Mr. Dean retired. The dance hall took over the whole building.

During the era of the amusement park, the dance hall operated as a nightclub with nightly live music along with special engagements from musicians such as Count Basie. From 1933 to 1950, Bert Niosi "Canada's King of Swing", provided the house orchestra. The hall still exists today as a special occasions event hall.

== Notable events ==
In 1923, dog races were held on the lawn in front of the Bathing Pavilion. The first Miss Toronto pageant took place at Sunnyside in August 1926. The first winner was Miss Jean Ford. It was an annual tradition on the Easter weekend for people to parade on the boardwalk.

In July 1936, Toronto was sweltering under temperatures of 41 °C (105 °F). People slept on the grass by the lake. On the beach, thirty men removed the tops from their bathing suits. They were arrested and charged with indecent exposure. They were acquitted and from then on it was acceptable for men to go topless on Toronto beaches.

On September 9, 1954, Marilyn Bell concluded her historic swim across Lake Ontario at the breakwater at Sunnyside. A plaque exists at the foot of Roncesvalles at the water's edge.

== Demolition ==
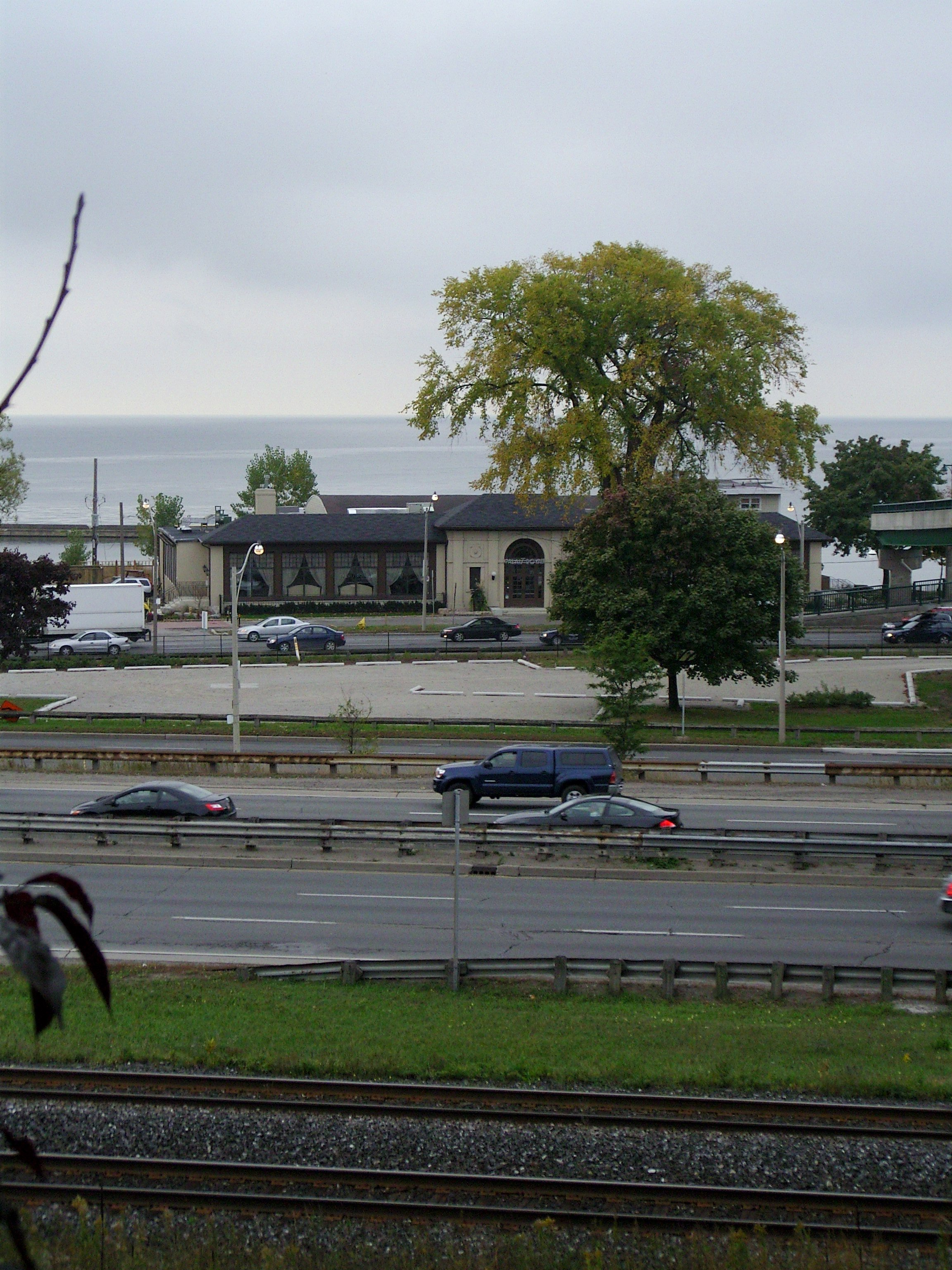
View in 2007 showing Palais Royale

The plans for the Gardiner Expressway were known since 1943, as part of a City of Toronto Planning Board report which called for tens of miles of super-highways criss-crossing the Toronto urban area. But it was not until after several fires in the winter of 1955 that the Toronto Harbour Commission ordered the park's demolition, facilitating the building of the roadway. Lake Shore Boulevard was the scene of regular traffic jams and the park was seen to be impeding 'progress' to the development of Toronto.

Most rides were demolished, however several amusements including the Derby Racer were moved to the Canadian National Exhibition (C.N.E), and the carousel to Disneyland where it was renamed the King Arthur Carrousel. Only the Sunnyside Pool and Bathing Pavilion and the Palais Royale buildings survive in place as relics of the Park. For two summers afterwards, a small children's amusement area named 'Kiddieland' was operated to the south of Lake Shore Boulevard, the site of Budapest Park today. It was operated by Conklin Shows. A children's amusement park, 'Centreville Amusement Park', was later built on the Toronto Islands.

The old Lakeshore Road and its connecting bridge to the King/Queen/Roncesvalles intersection was demolished also. The Lake Shore Boulevard roadway was doubled from four lanes to eight lanes in the area of the amusement park with a large empty median between the lanes in each direction. For several years afterwards the median was used as parking lot for the annual Canadian National Exhibition. A pedestrian bridge was built to the south-side of Lake Shore Boulevard to replace the bridge and stairs that was demolished.

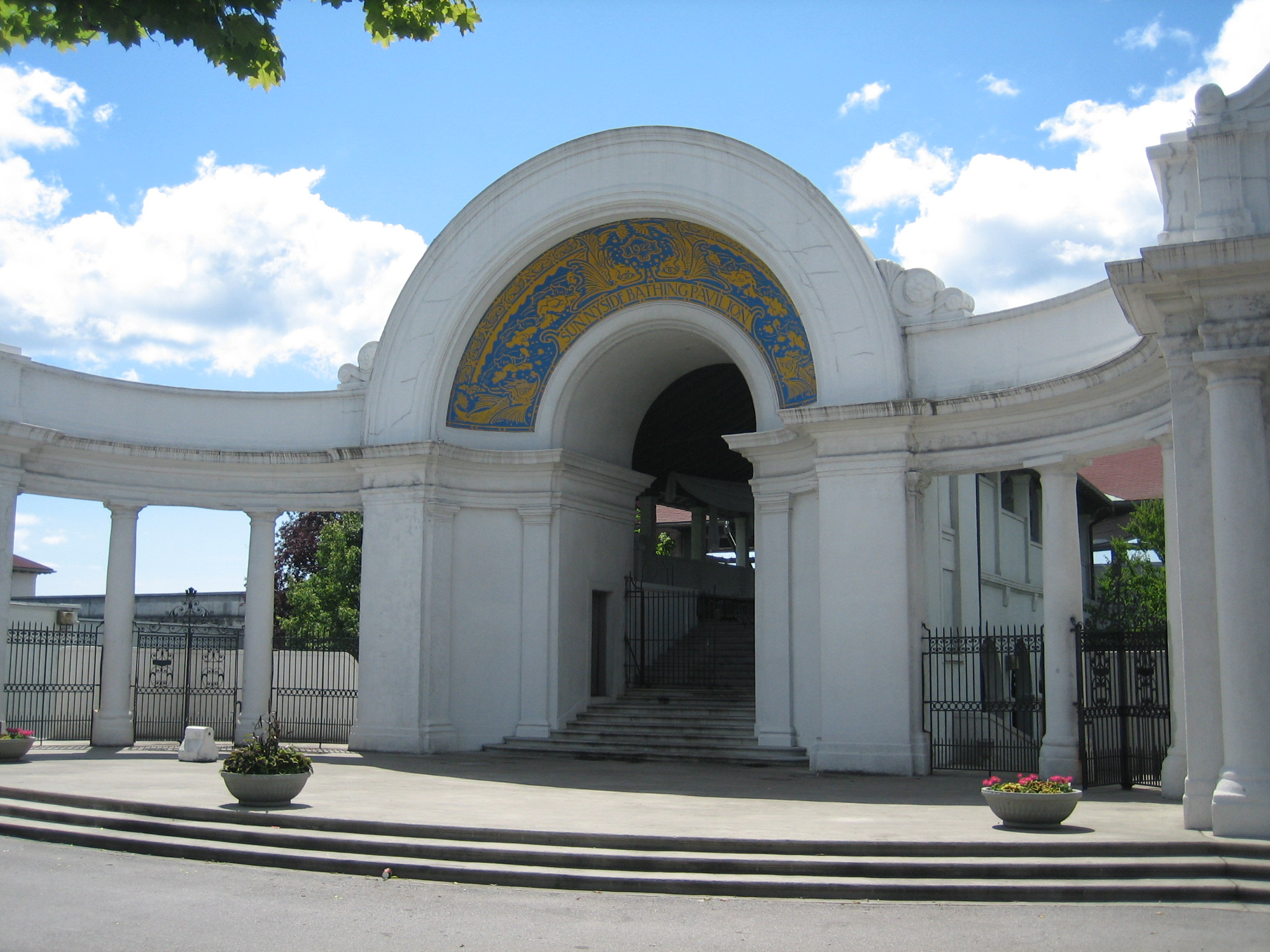
The Sunnyside Bathing Pavilion, one of the few surviving structures

Starting July 21, 1957, the Queen streetcars that travelled down the old bridge and served the shoreline and park were moved to a new track to the north of the rail lines, in the middle of the new 'The Queensway' roadway, and the old tracks were removed.

In 1964, the lands of the park were transferred from Harbour Commission ownership to the City of Toronto, which has operated Budapest Park along the shoreline ever since, but most of the remaining lands of the amusement park are vacant or are roadways or parking lots.

In 1967, the Sunnyside train station just to the north of the old park ceased operations and was demolished in 1973.

Sunnyside Bus Terminal, which opened in 1936, just north of the train station, ceased operation in 1990 and is now a McDonald's.

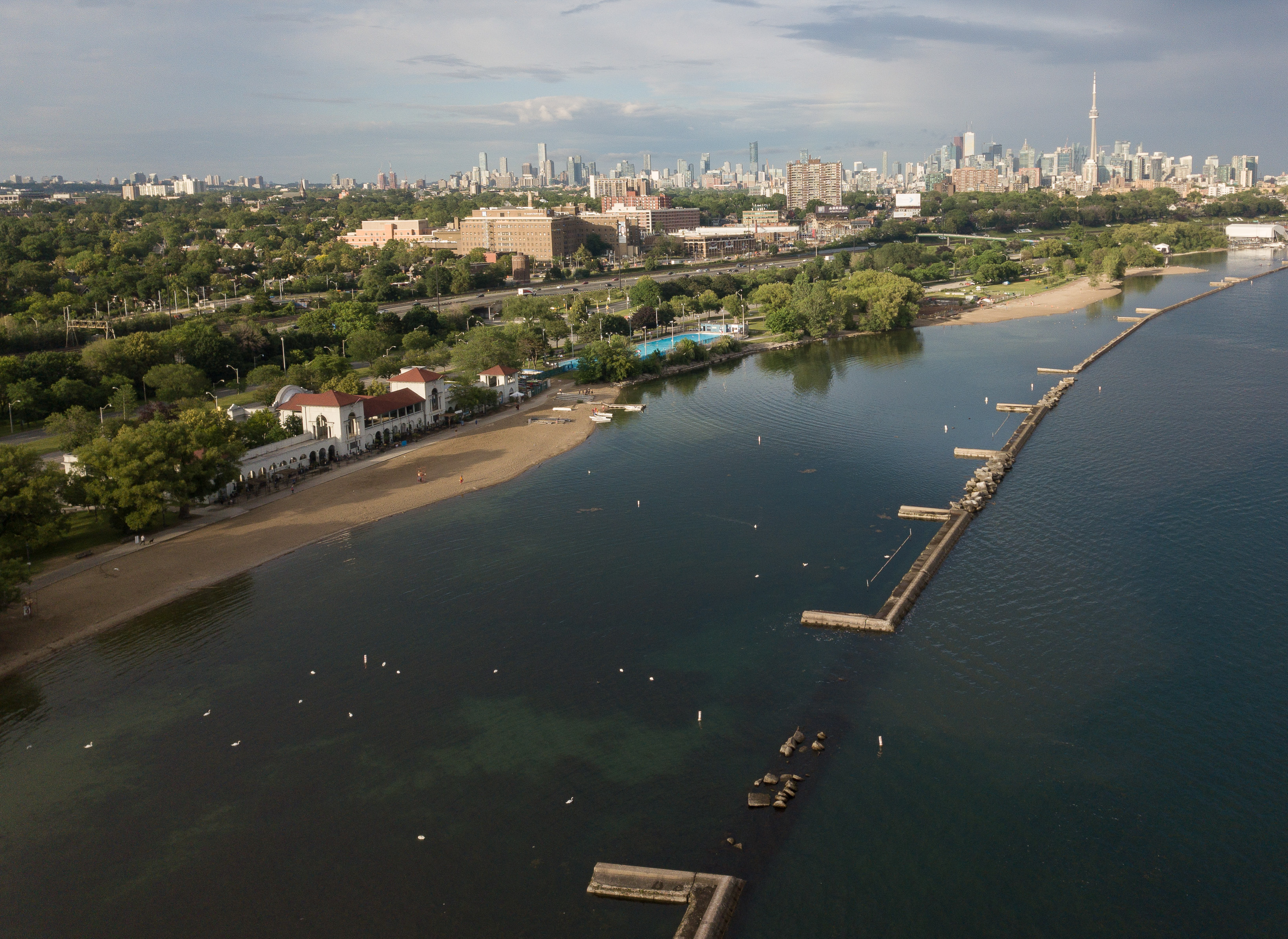

=== The area today ===
The boardwalk was removed and replaced with a boardwalk made of recycled plastic planks. A children's playground was built just east of the Ryder Pool. A recreation trail, part of the Martin Goodman Trail, was built south of Lake Shore Boulevard through the area for cyclists and in-line skaters.

== Rides and games ==
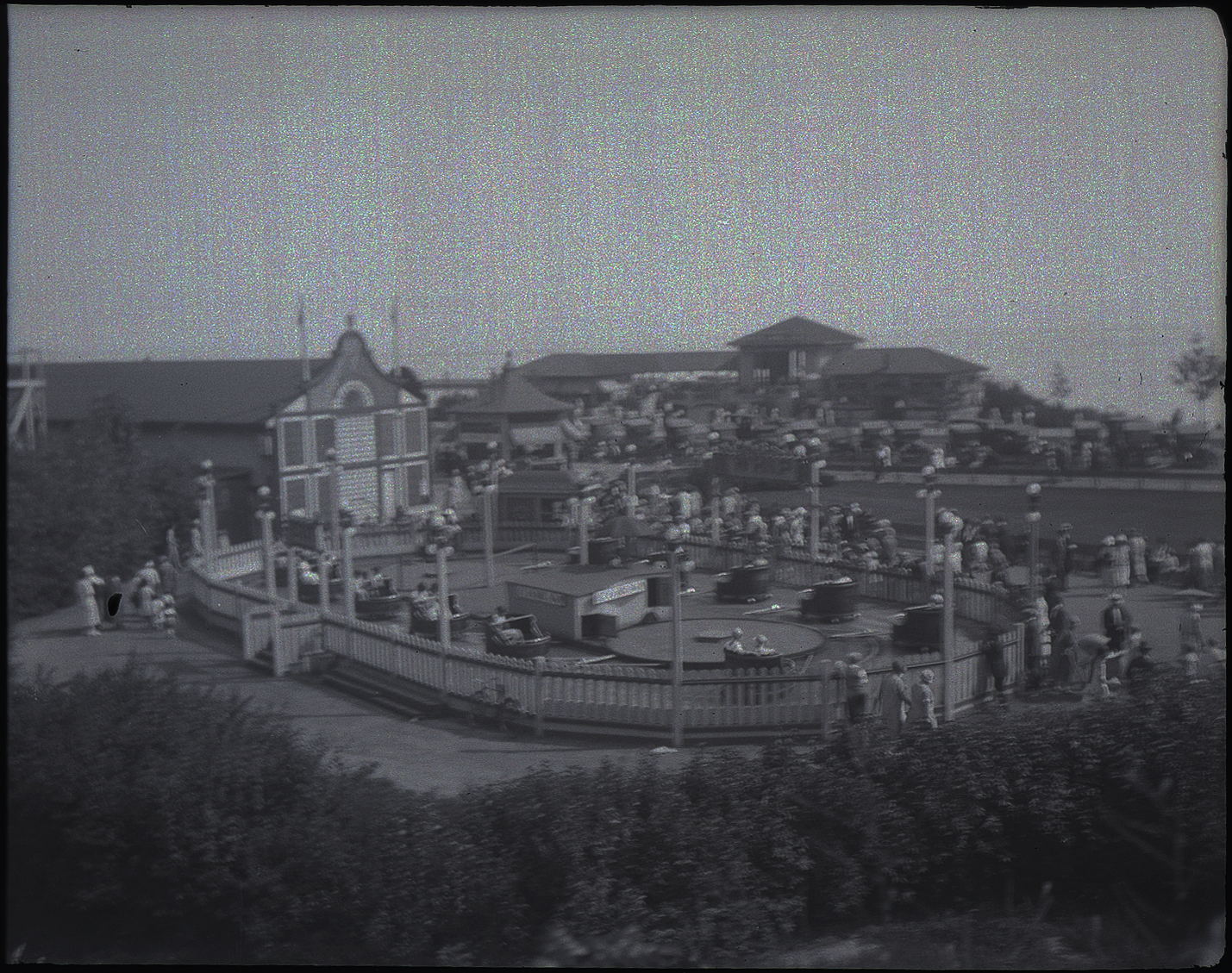
“The Whip” at Sunnyside Amusement Park in Toronto, taken in July 1925, from the M.O. Hammond fonds held at the Archives of Ontario.

- Aero Swing, (a Traver Seaplane De Luxe)
- Auto Ride
- Custer Cars
- Derby Racer (indoor horse-racing carousel)
- Dutch Mill
- Flyer (roller coaster)
- Flying Scooters
- Fun Land (funhouse)
- Gad-A-Bout (bumper cars)
- Glider
- Looper
- Lover's Express
- Menagerie Merry-Go-Round (carousel)
- Miniature golf
- Moon Rocket
- Octopus
- Red Bug
- Spitfire
- Spook Castle
- Toboggan Wheel
- Whip
- Whoopee (later renamed the "Swooper")

Source: Closed Canadian Parks

== References and notes ==
- Cotter, Charis (2004). Toronto Between the Years. Firefly Books. ISBN 1-55297-899-0.
- Filey, Mike (1996). I Remember Sunnyside. Dundurn Press. ISBN 1-55002-274-1.

== See also ==
- Palais Royale
- Sunnyside, Toronto – area of park
- Hanlan's Point Amusement Park - Sunnyside's competitor on the Toronto Islands
