= Hanlan's Point Amusement Park =

Former amusement park in Toronto, Ontario, Canada

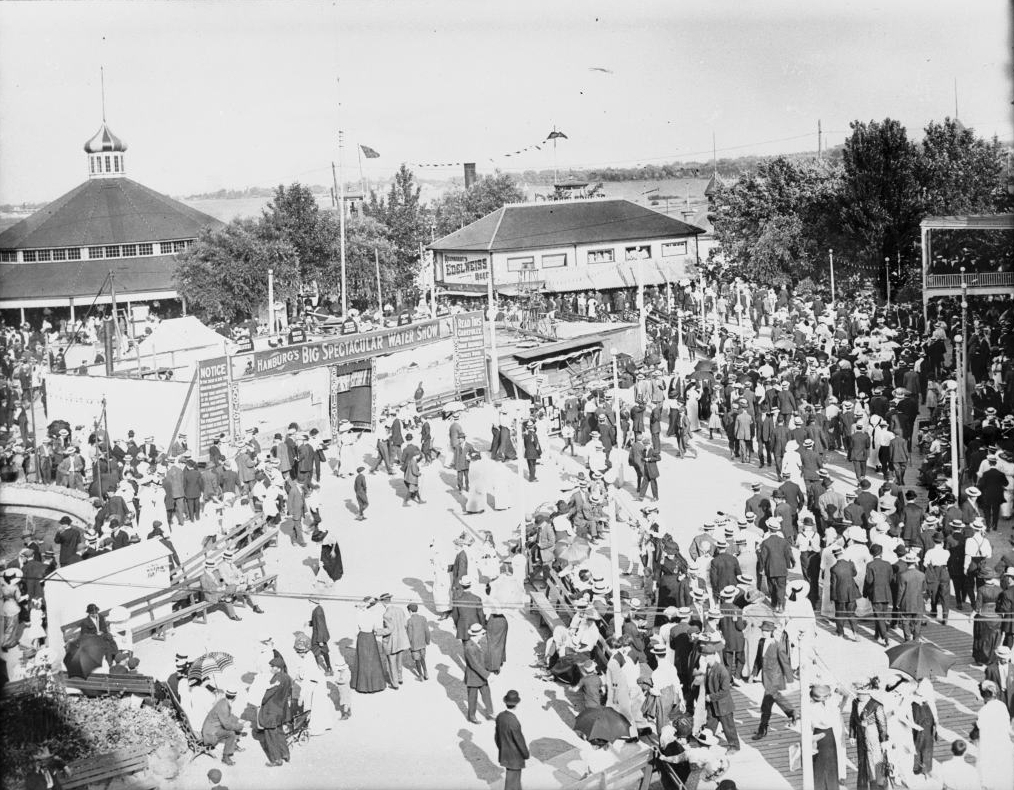
- Hanlan's Point Amusement Park, 1911
- Interactive map of Hanlan's Point Amusement Park
- Location: Hanlan's Point, Toronto Islands, Toronto, Ontario, Canada
- Coordinates: 43°37′18.32″N 79°23′40.21″W
- Status: Defunct
- Opened: 1880s
- Closed: 1930s

Hanlan's Point Amusement Park was an attraction on Hanlan's Point on the Toronto Islands that operated from the 1880s until the 1930s and was regarded as "Canada's answer to Coney Island".

== History ==
Hanlan's Point is the most westerly of the Toronto Islands. Originally a cottage community, one of the first settlers in the area was John Hanlan, after whom the island was named after in 1862. In 1878, the Hanlan family converted their cottage into a hotel, and then replaced it with a new, larger 25-room Hanlan's Hotel in 1880, and began to develop the island as a tourist attraction. The Hanlan's Point Amusement Park was one of a series of attractions built by the Hanlans in the 1880s. In 1892, Ned Hanlan sold the amusement park, hotel, and other amenities to the Toronto Ferry Company which operated all the ferries travelling between the islands and the mainland, providing the only means for the general public to travel to the island.

In its heyday the amusement park was one of Toronto's major attractions and included a roller coaster, a miniature train, midway, grandstand, a vaudeville theatre, dancing pavilion, shooting gallery, tea garden and various rides and games. It is best remembered for having a 40 foot high platform from which diving horses would leap into Lake Ontario. Hanlan's Point Stadium was built next to the amusement park and was the home of the Toronto Maple Leafs baseball team, both of which were also owned by the ferry company.

A fire on August 10, 1909, destroyed the hotel, the wooden stadium and all but five concession stands of the amusement park and did $200,000 in damage. The amusement park and a stadium, now made of concrete, were rebuilt in time for the 1910 season.

The park started to decline in the 1920s due to competition from the Sunnyside Amusement Park which opened on the mainland in 1922 and was accessible by automobile and streetcar, making it easier to access than Hanlan's Point which could only be reached by ferry. Attendance declined further in 1926 when the Maple Leafs baseball team moved from Hanlan's Point Stadium to Maple Leaf Stadium at the foot of Bathurst Street. In 1927, Lol Solman sold the Toronto Ferry Company, which owned the ferry service to the island as well as the amusement park, the stadium, and other amenities, to the City of Toronto with the Toronto Transportation Commission assuming operation of the ferries and the amusement park. The park was demolished in 1937 in order to make way for the Toronto Island airport. Today, the portion of Hanlan's Point which is not occupied by the airport remains a public recreation area consisting of Hanlan's Point Beach, a baseball diamond, bicycle and hiking trails, a tennis court, a volleyball court, picnic areas, fire pits and parkland as well as the Gibraltar Point Lighthouse.

== See also ==
- Hanlan's Point Beach
- Centreville Amusement Park - a smaller amusement park on the Toronto Islands which replaced Hanlan's Point
- Scarboro Beach Amusement Park - a competing amusement park operating in the east end of Toronto in the same period
