= Palais Royale =

Dance hall in Toronto, Canada

Coordinates: 43.6367°N 79.447192°W

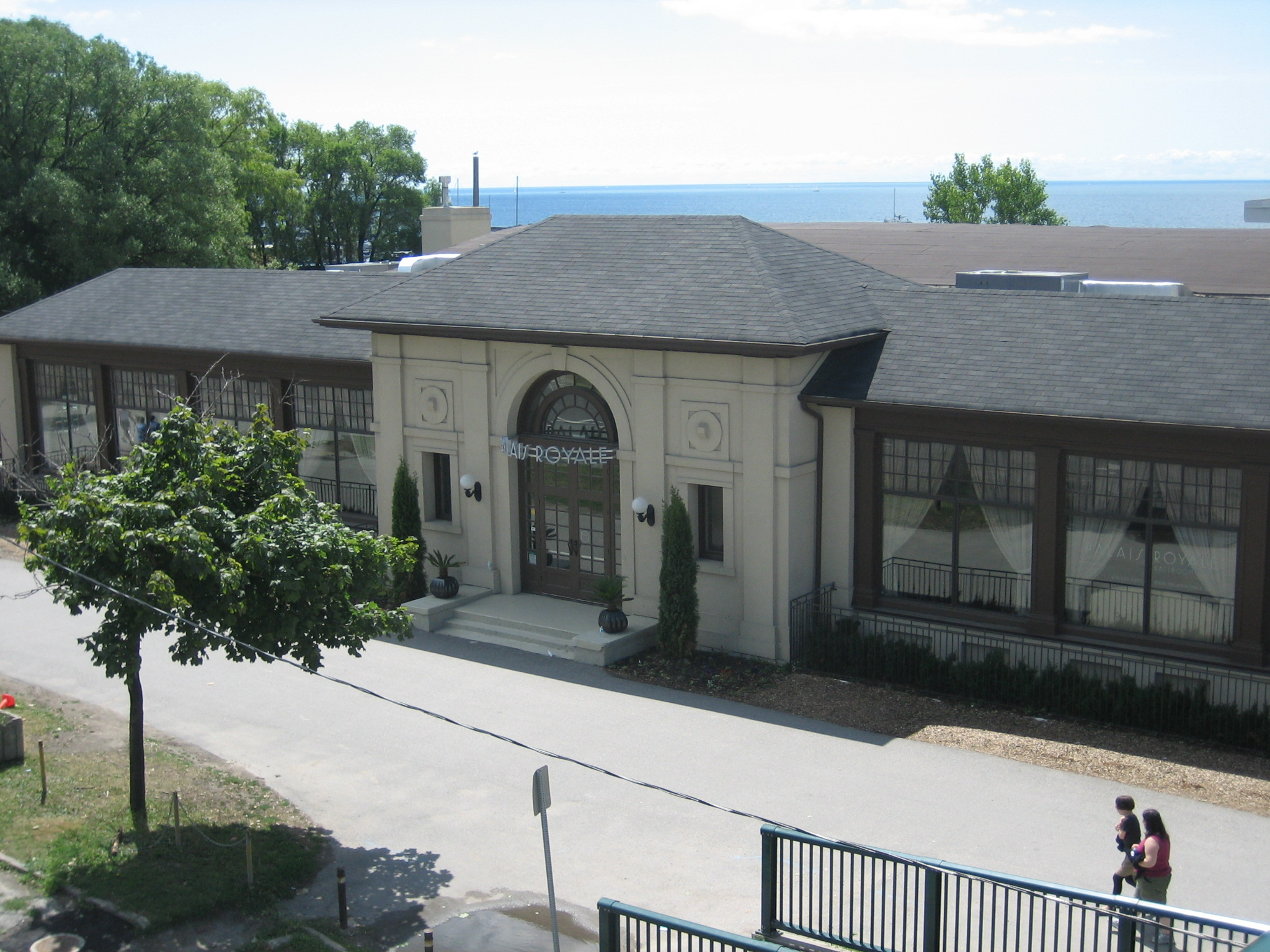
The Palais Royale

Palais Royale is a dance hall in Toronto, Ontario, Canada, located on Lake Shore Boulevard at the foot of Roncesvalles Avenue on Lake Ontario. Originally built as a boat works, it became notable as a night club in the now-defunct Sunnyside Amusement Park, hosting many prominent 'big band' jazz bands. Since the Park's demolition, the building has ceased to be a nightclub, being used for special occasions and concerts. It has recently been remodeled and is in use for special occasions and meetings.

== History ==
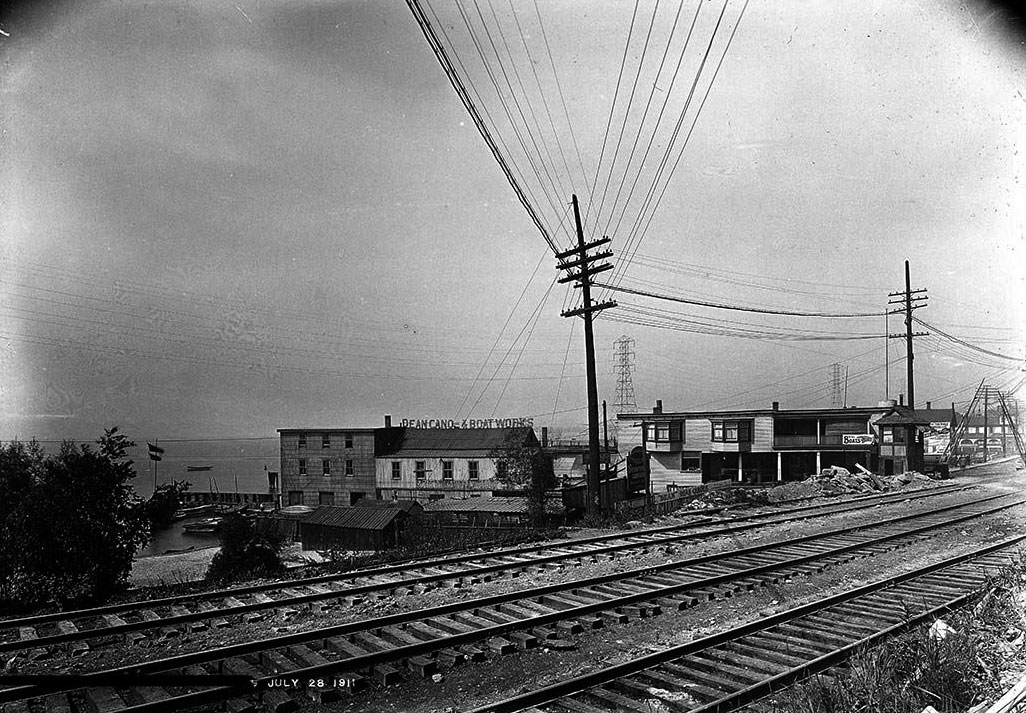
Dean's Boat Works, 1911

In the 1900s and 1910s, the Sunnyside area was undeveloped except for a few waterfront uses. One waterfront business was Dean's Boat House, building canoes, renting boats and providing local boat cruises, located on Lake Shore Road at Queen Street, south-east of High Park. Starting in the 1910s, the waterfront was redeveloped by the Toronto Harbour Commission and all of the waterfront buildings were removed. The waterfront was extended to the south and new buildings were constructed to replace those removed.

The new Dean's Sunnyside Pleasure Boats, a canoe boat-building factory and a supplier to the local Parkdale canoe club was opened in 1922 as part of the new Sunnyside Beach. The new building was designed by the architectural firm of Chapman, Oxley & Bishop, architects who designed the Sunnyside Bathing Pavilion, which opened that same year nearby. The boat-building activities occupied the basement and part of the first floor, which was at shoreline level. The second floor, at ground level from the front, became a dance hall. Although Dean's Pleasure Boats was successful for some time, it eventually went out of business and the Palais became a dance hall only.

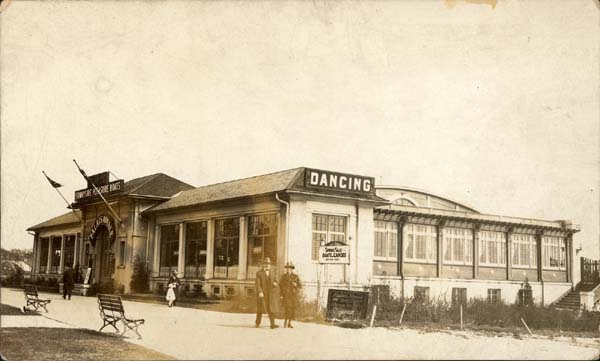
Palais Royale, circa 1930

In 1932 Bill Cuthbert and George Deller took over the Palais Royale and this was the period of its greatest popularity. 'Big bands' such as Duke Ellington and Count Basie, Paul Whiteman and the Dorsey Brothers played there. The largest audience was in 1933, when 3000 people danced to Eddie Duchin's Park Central Orchestra from New York. From 1933 to 1950, Bert Niosi "Canada's King of Swing" and his orchestra were the house band.

Admission was 10 cents plus five cents a dance. Only soft drinks were available and certain dances, such as the jitterbug, were forbidden as they were considered too risqué. Dances were held six nights a week (dancing was not allowed on Sundays).

The land on which the Palais Royale was built was originally leased from the Toronto Harbour Commission in 1922 for 21 years. Cuthbert and Deller renewed the lease in 1944 for another 21 years. They sold their rights to Joe Broderick in 1949. Broderick operated the facility as a dance hall from 1949 to 1966.

=== Desegregating the Dance Hall ===
In 1955, Sunnyside Amusement Park was demolished for the Gardiner Expressway and Lake Shore Boulevard expansions.

That summer, staff at the Palais Royale intervened to prevent a Black man and a white woman from dancing together, humiliating them and ejecting them onto the street. According to author Ernie Tate: "The couple had openly breached Toronto's unofficial form of segregation under which very little social mixing took place between blacks and whites. The Palais Royale was well known for its racist policies."

In response, activists in the black community organized picket lines to protest the incident. Danny Braithwaite, a young Black activist was one of the protest leaders. Danny would continue his anti-racist organizing at Toronto's school board and in his union local.

The black community was supported by Trotskyists and members of the CCF Youth Forum, who joined the picketers. Feminist activist Pat Schulz recalls that she entered the Palais in July and danced with a Black male partner without being challenged and the Palais was officially desegregated from that point on.

In the period 1956-1959 the hall lost money, but Broderick was showing profits again by 1964. Broderick attempted to negotiate a further lease in 1965 but he was not successful and he sold his rights to the Polish National Union in January 1966. By this time the land had been transferred to the City of Toronto, which had placed the Palais Royale on its list of properties for demolition in 1965. It was then that the City removed the hall's east-side parking lot, formerly the mini-golf course, planting grass and willow trees. However, instead of being demolished, the property was instead designated as a historic site by the City in 1974.

Since then, the hall has been used for concerts by a diverse range of musicians. From Stan Kenton, Benny Louis, Woody Herman, The Carlton Show Band, The Specials, Joe Jackson and Rough Trade around 1980 to concerts by The Pogues, Blur, Blue Rodeo, Sigur Rós, Echo & the Bunnymen, The Sadies, Constantines, Sloan and a Rolling Stones concert on August 16, 2002. The building was a film location for the 1990 film "Queen of Mean".

On June 18, 1986, the City of Toronto attempted to buy out the lease for the Palais Royale for $82,500, the price at which the property was valued in 1922. The Polish National Union claimed it had spent $236,697 on repairs to the building and refused the offer. In June 1987, the City began legal action to retain control of the property, a process which ended with a decision by the Ontario Court of Appeal on March 28, 1994 which terminated the lease on April 16, 1999.

In 1988 a feature film entitled Palais Royale was released, set and filmed in the nightclub.

The Property was leased to Shoreline Entertainment in 2000, on the condition that repairs and renovations be made to the hall. Shoreline transferred the lease to the Pegasus Group in 2005. The Group spent $3.5 million on renovations, gutting the interior, replacing the windows and rebuilding the rear terrace. Described by Den Farnworth of Goldsmith Borgal Architects as "it's not a true restoration, it's more an adaptive reuse", the renovations attracted some controversy.

On July 22 2006, the Palais Royale hosted its official Grand Re-Opening, and the house band for the evening was Swing Shift Big Band with vocalists Larisa Renee and Dave Statham. City officials and the lead architect for the renovations were in attendance for this celebration and public dance which was promoted heavily by JazzFM 91.1.

=== Controversies ===
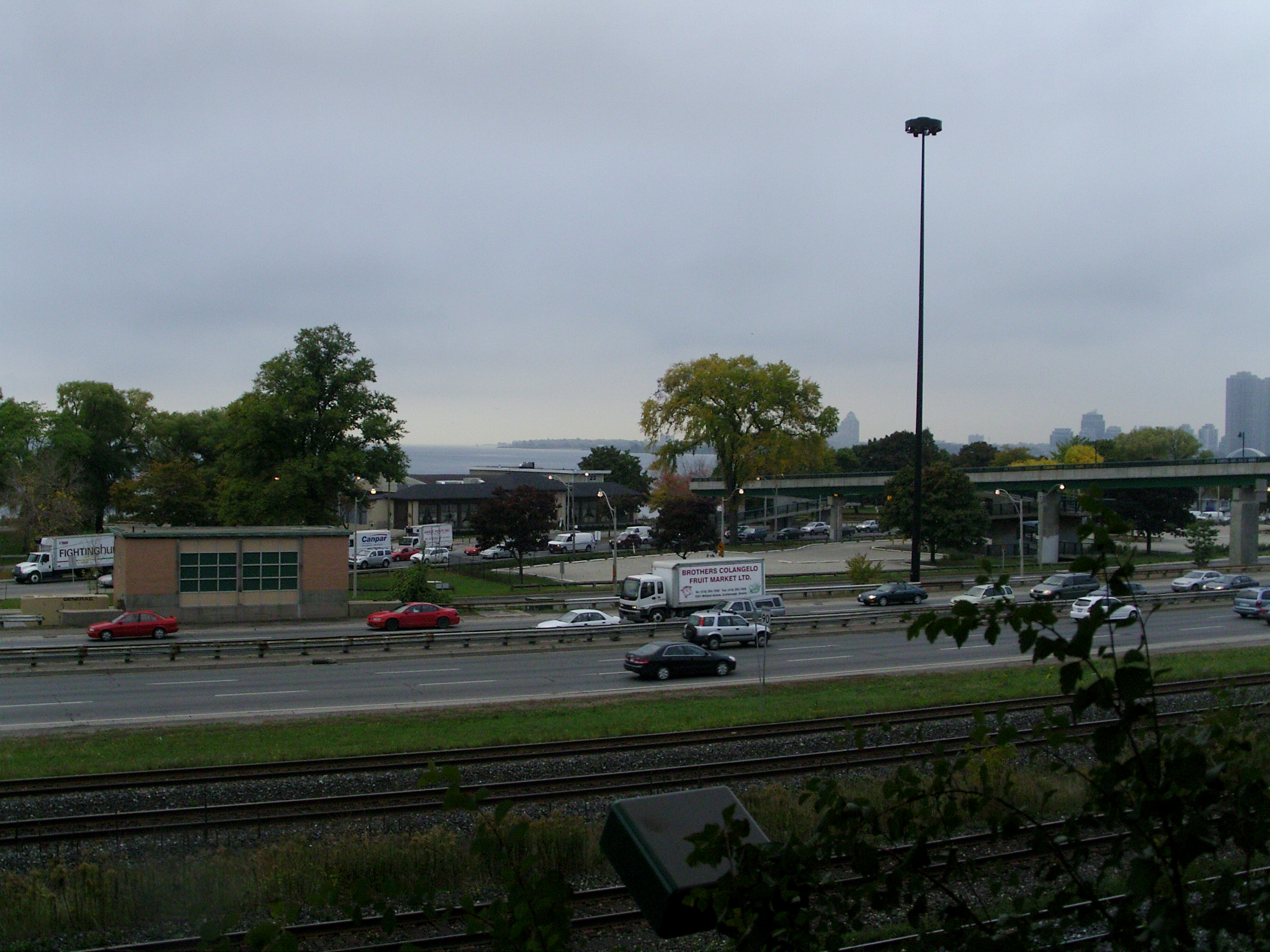
View of Palais and median parking lot, 2007

Critics of the renovation denounced the new design for its destruction of major architectural elements and inept approximation of historical stylings. Detractors claim the new design uses many contemporary elements which are anachronistic on a building of the Art Deco era. Supporters tout the security of its contemporized design, one more likely to attract paying customers and ensure future maintenance, and ultimately, the existence of the structure.

In addition to the design controversy, a controversy erupted over the restoration of the facility's parking lot, which was removed in 1965 and replaced by grass and willow trees, which had grown to mature height in the meantime. Local groups opposed the removal of the trees to repave the parking lot and opposed paving a new parking lot, proposing on-street parking. After public consultations, the City of Toronto has since paved a new parking lot for the hall across the street on former Amusement Park lands between the east and west lanes of Lake Shore Boulevard, and provided a set of stoplights for customers to cross the street to the hall, but preserving the willow trees of the old lot.

Redevelopment plans for the waterfront area include the relocation of Lake Shore Boulevard and the parking lots north, against the Gardiner right-of-way, freeing up park lands along the water.

== See also ==
- Roncesvalles, Toronto
- Sunnyside, Toronto
- Palaye Royale
