= Sunnyside, Toronto =

Lakefront district

Coordinates: 43.637737°N 79.456301°W

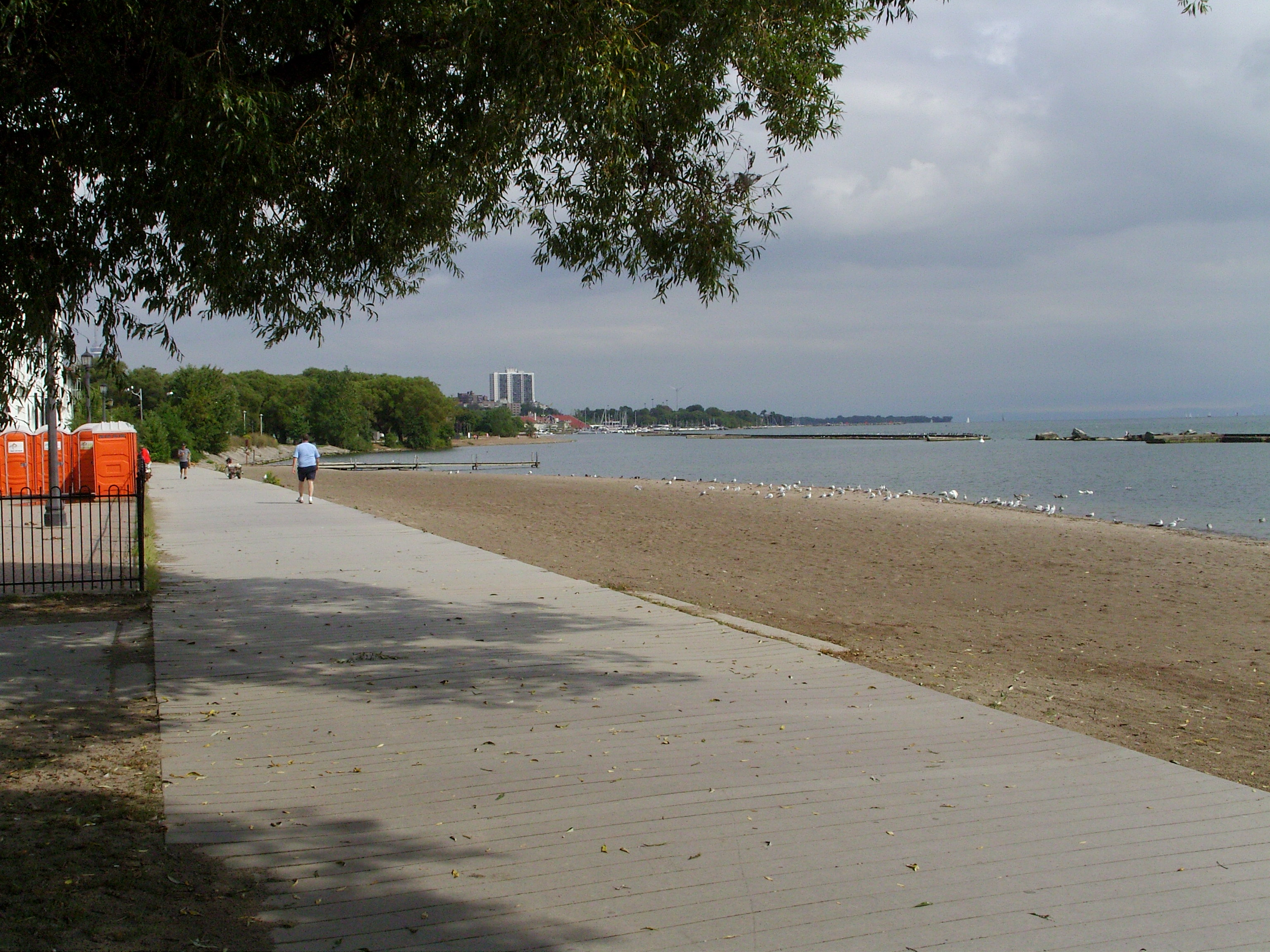
Sunnyside waterfront

Sunnyside is a lakefront district in Toronto, Ontario, Canada. It includes a beach and park area along Lake Ontario's Humber Bay, from west of Exhibition Place to the mouth of the Humber River. The area has several recreation uses, including rowing clubs, sports clubs, picnic areas, playgrounds, a nightclub, a bathing pavilion and public pool. The area is a 3 kilometres (1.9 mi) long strip along the lakeshore, bounded by the Gardiner Expressway and rail lines, which separate it from the Parkdale, Roncesvalles and Swansea neighbourhoods to the north. The name originates in a local farm owned by John Howard, which was situated just to the north, on the location of the current St. Joseph's Health Centre hospital.

The area is first noted in Toronto history as the location of the landing of an 1813 attack in the War of 1812. As Toronto grew, High Park preserved the open space to the north, while the Sunnyside area along the lake was taken over by new rail lines and a hydro-electric line serving Toronto, although the area remained popular for boating and swimming. By 1900, there were calls to clean up the area and in the 1910s, the area was the site of a massive waterfront reclamation public works project which expanding the land area by 38 hectares (94 acres), provided a breakwater for boating and built several beaches. Its popularity grew as a summertime recreation area and from 1922 to 1955, the reclaimed land was home to the popular Sunnyside Amusement Park which ran every summer. The amusement park was demolished to facilitate the building of the expressway, leaving behind several shoreline recreation uses from the era of the park, including the pool, the beaches and the sports clubs, all of which remain popular and well-used each summer.

== History ==
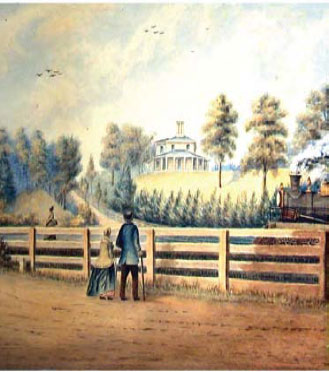
Painting of Colborne Lodge, 1865

The area is within the traditional lands of several First Nations. An archeological find early in the 1900s near High Park found evidence of an indigenous burial mound similar to those of the Red Paint People dating back over 2,000 years. The Wendat were known to move within the Toronto area, until the Iroquois displaced them. The remains of several First Nation villages have been found in Toronto, attributed to the Wendat and the Iroquois.

In 1615, it is believed that French explorer Étienne Brûlé was the first European to visit the area. His party first passed through Teiaiagon, an Iroquoian village situated at the site of modern-day Baby Point. Teiaigon was located along the Toronto Carrying-Place Trail, a portage route that extended from approximately the area of today's Sunnyside Pavilion north to the Lake Simcoe area. Part of the trail is presumed to be along the route of today's "Indian Road", to the east of High Park. The Teiaiagon site was abandoned by the Iroquois, who were displaced by the Mississauga.

The first European settlement of the area originated in 1750 with the founding of Fort Rouillé by the French on today's Canadian National Exhibition (CNE) grounds. During the Seven Years' War, the French destroyed the fort in July 1759 to prevent it falling into the hands of the British. Its foundations were excavated in the 1980s.

In the War of 1812, American troops attacked the then-town of York. The troops arrived by water and landed on the Sunnyside waterfront east of Roncesvalles. The troops attacked Fort York to the east the next morning and looted the town. The looting of York led to a retaliatory raid on, and looting of Washington, D.C., burning the White House.

=== Early development ===
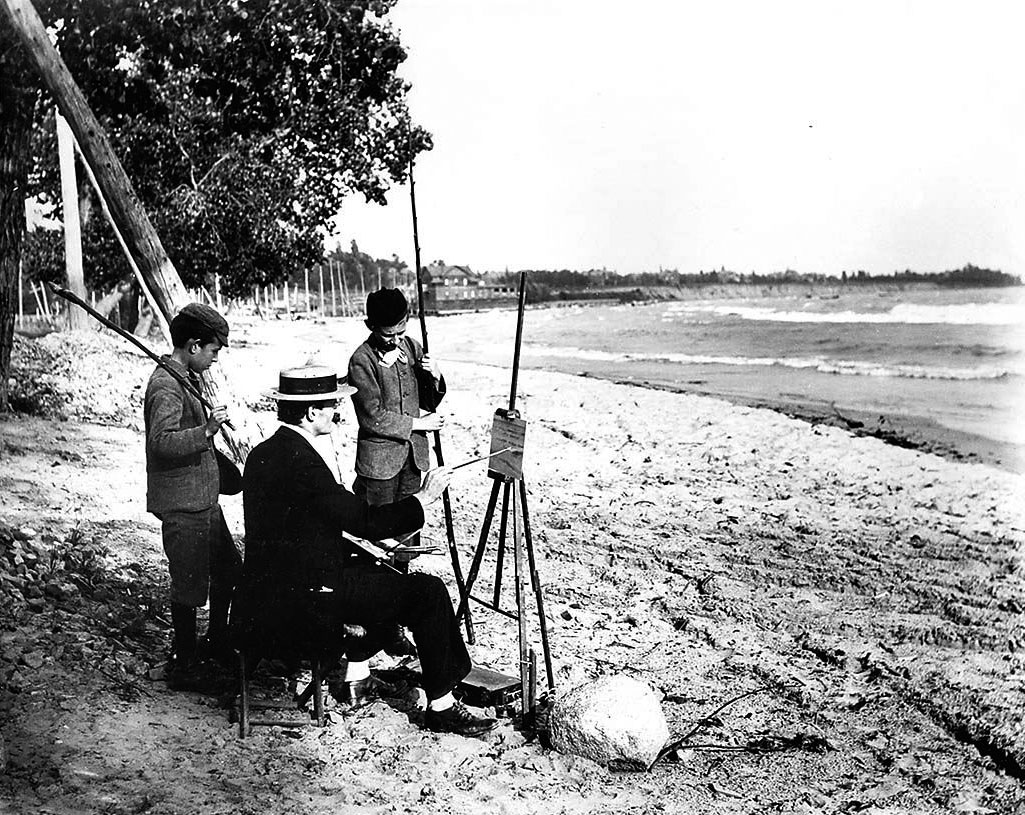
Owen Staples painting on the beach, 1907

European settlement came in the early 19th century. Land grants were given in the area of Swansea, High Park and east of High Park. Colborne Lodge, located within High Park, just north of the lake and owned by John Howard was built in 1837.

In the 1850s, the Great Western Railway built the first rail line along the waterfront, between High Park and the waterfront. At first, the rail line was built at ground level with level crossings and was not a physical barrier. Starting just east of Roncesvalles the rails used to rise the hill to the level of today's Springhurst Avenue to the South Parkdale railway station. A major change came with the 'Parkdale Grade Separation Project'. The rail lines along the waterfront were evened up to a level grade along the waterfront, with a large digging project from Dowling to east of Dufferin. The hill necessitated that trains travel at full throttle to climb the hill, a factor in an 1870s train collision. In 1910, the station was relocated to the foot of Roncesvalles and named Sunnyside. The rail lines were widened and elevated above the shoreline from Sunnyside station west to the Humber, taking more of the waterfront area, nearly to the shoreline. This necessitated the removal of a level crossing between Queen Street and Lakeshore Road and a bridge over the tracks was built, with subways at several road intersections.

The first lakeshore road, a toll road along the waterfront, was built in the 19th century, prior to the incorporation of Parkdale. The Village of Parkdale extended King Street to its intersection at Queen Street to bypass the toll road. A road connection was built from the intersection of Roncesvalles, King and Queen Streets to the lakeshore road on or about 1900, giving access to trams to deliver visitors to High Park. There was a level crossing of the tracks south of today's St. Joseph's Hospital. The bridge over the tracks was completed in July 1914 and the level crossing closed. The trams then followed the new route across the bridge to King and Queen.

The crossing was the location where a busker, Charlie Soley, performed for many years to those passing to High Park. Less than 3 feet (0.91 m) tall, and weighing 40 pounds (18 kg), he had a grey beard and wore a cabbage leaf to cover his head from the sun. Soley played fiddle music on the violin and his death was front-page news in 1916, when he died at the age of 54 from bronchitis.

Along the south side of the lakeshore road, commercial uses such as Dean's Boat House (a boat factory) and Meyer's Hotel were built on or around 1900. The Parkdale Canoe Club, today's Boulevard Club was inaugurated in 1905. With the coming of hydro-electric power from Niagara Falls hydro-electric lines and towers were erected along the waterfront. The area to the south of the rail lines was narrow, but as the Parkdale area grew in population, the foot of Roncesvalles became a popular swimming area. A series of changing booths was built in 1911 along the waterfront for bathers. A slide was built alongside the new bridge to the lake for swimmers. In 1916, the City started providing free streetcar service to take children to bathe at Sunnyside.

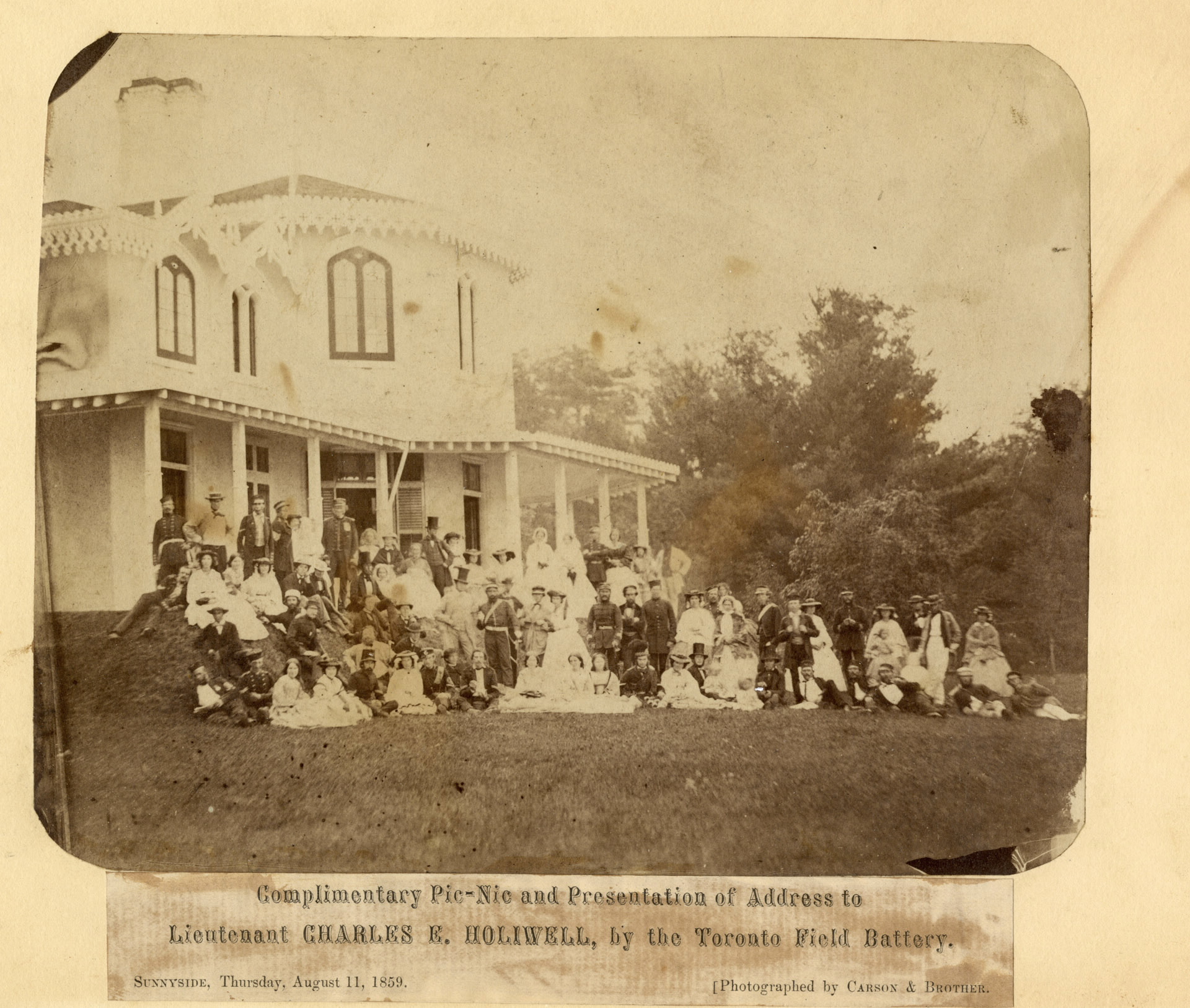
Group at Sunnyside Farm, 1859

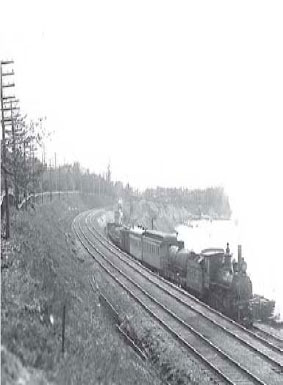
View east from Sunnyside Avenue, 1910

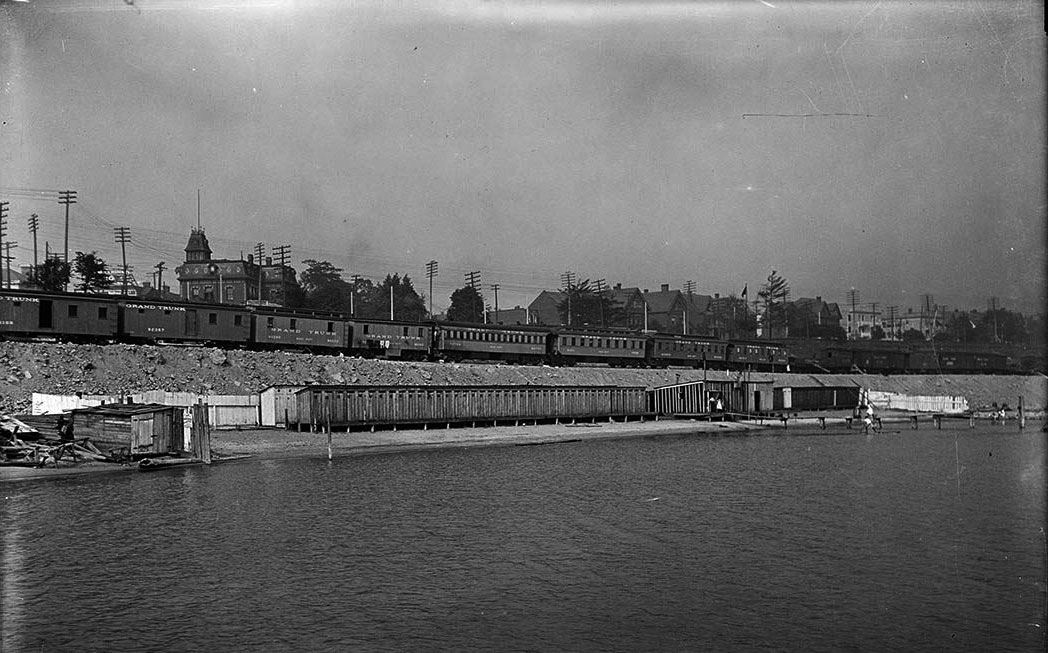
View of swimming changing facilities, 1911

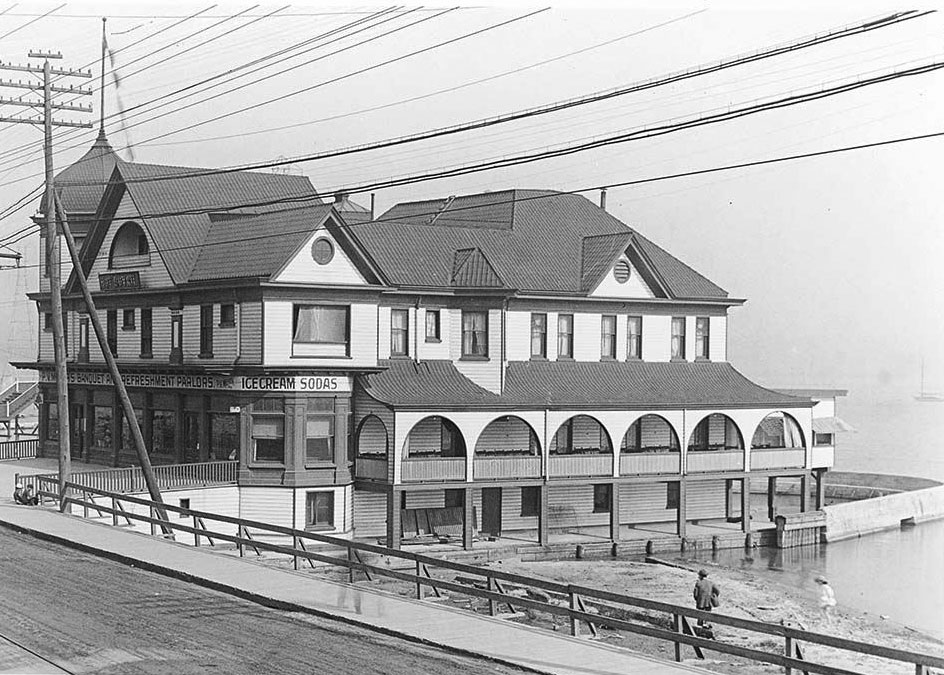
Meyer's Hotel at foot of Indian Road, 1911

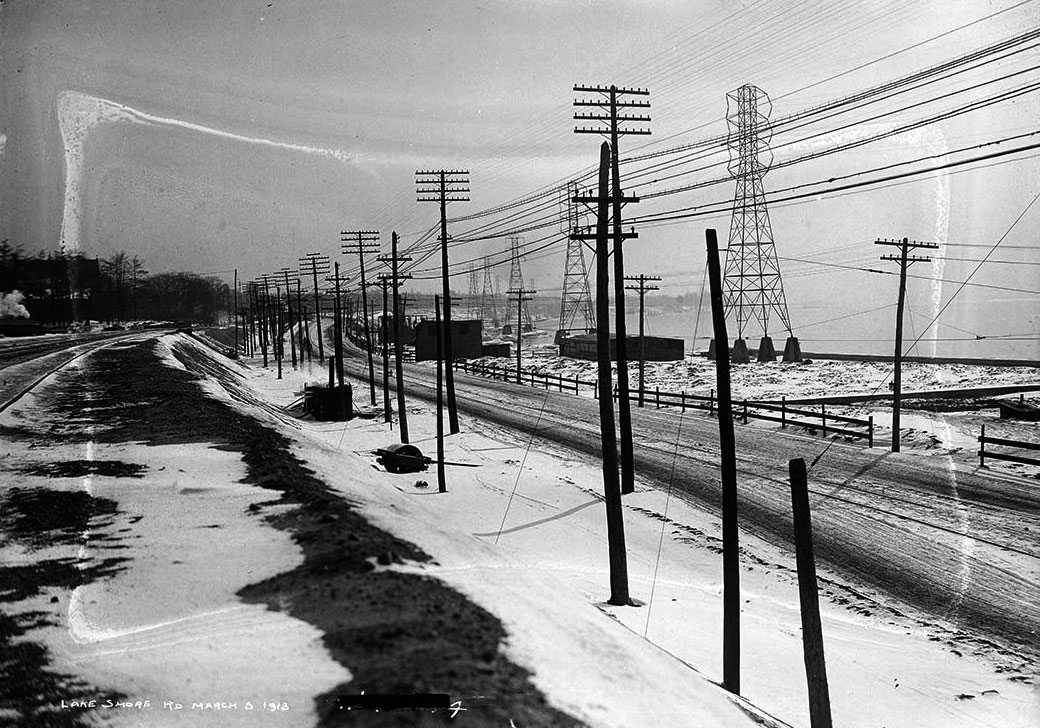
View of Lakeshore Road looking east to Sunnyside, 1913.

Free bathing cars started in 1916.

=== Infilling builds a waterfront ===
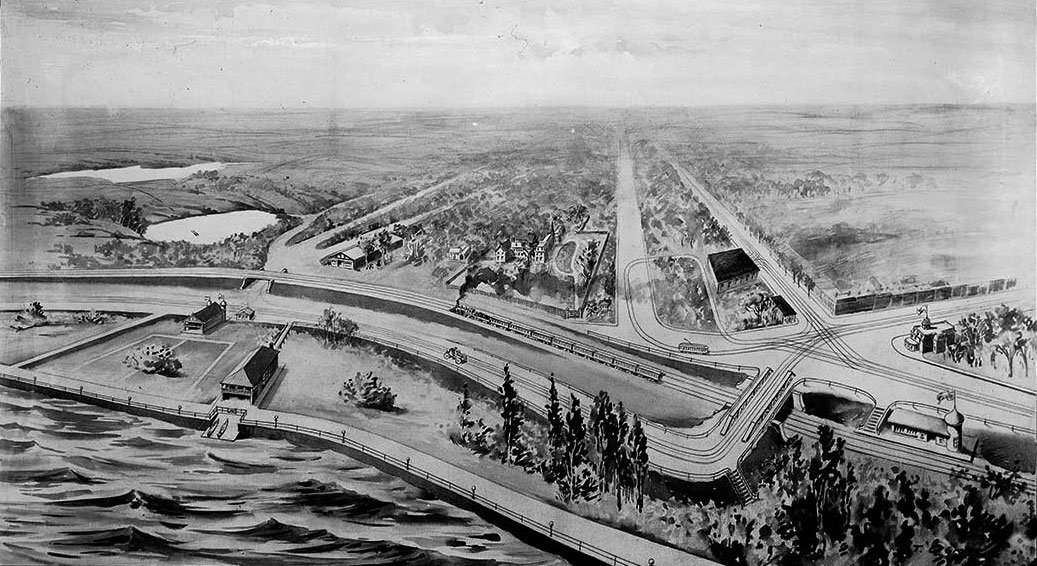
A 1914 plan for the area.

By this time very little lands were left along the waterfront, and the lands were used for buildings on piers, rail lines, road ways, hydro towers and temporary changing booths for bathers. The general sentiment was that the lakeshore was in a dismal state. Thomas Joseph Stewart, a federal MP in 1913, remarked that Sunnyside was a "dirty, filthy hole." In 1914, the Toronto Harbour Commission started a CA$25 million ($446 million in 2025 dollars) project to improve the waterfront from Ashbridge's Bay in the east, to the Humber in the west. Following this plan, most of the 1910s and early 1920s was spent on construction and most of the waterfront lands were little used. All of the buildings on the water west of Roncesvalles were demolished. The Commission extended the shoreline about 100 yards (91 m) to the south, from Wilson Park Road to the Humber River (the western boundary of Toronto at the time), using landfill brought from Pickering, Ontario and sand dredged from the lake bottom. The hydro-electric lines and the Canoe Club building, previously located on the water, were now inland.

The new lands were divided between roadway expansions and park land. The shoreline itself was converted to beach along most of the length. A 'breakwater' would serve to create a protected waterway along the shore from the Humber to Bathurst Street. Lakeshore Road, now connected to King and Queen by bridge, was widened to four lanes from the Humber to the Jameson Avenue area.

The Harbour Commission made waterfront land available for lease and several of the waterfront businesses returned. Dean's Boat House would be rebuilt in the eventual Palais Royale building. The location of Meyer's Hotel became the site of the Sunnyside Pavilion Restaurant. The new Beach and its Bathing Pavilion would open in 1922.

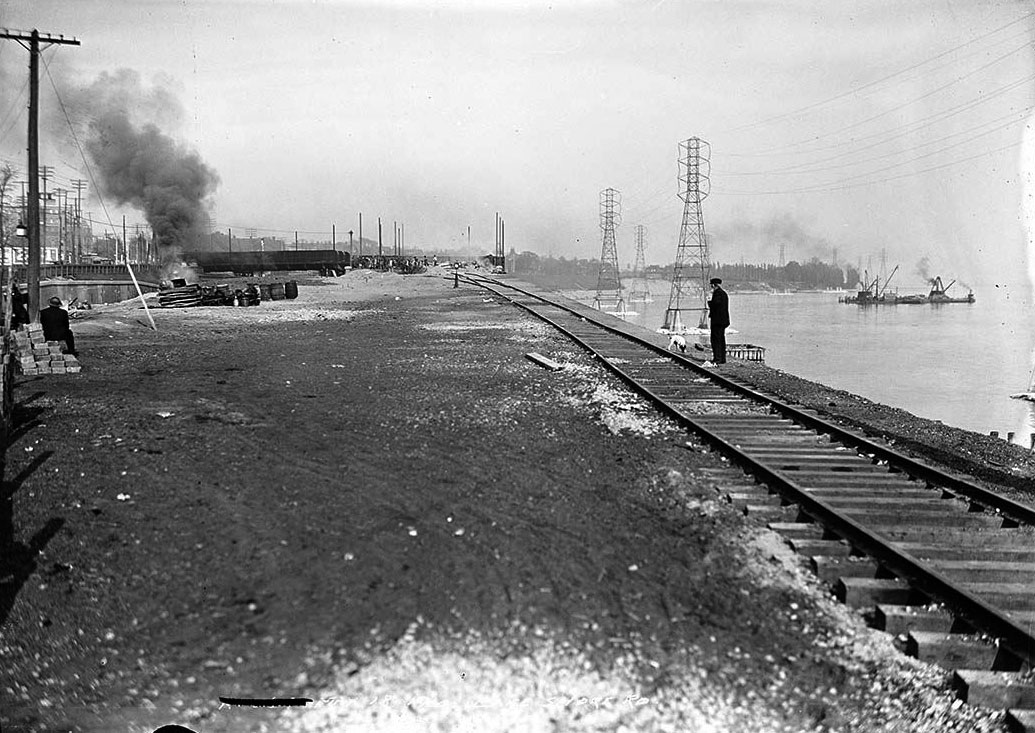
Road bed of new Lakeshore Road, 1914. Dredging boat at right.

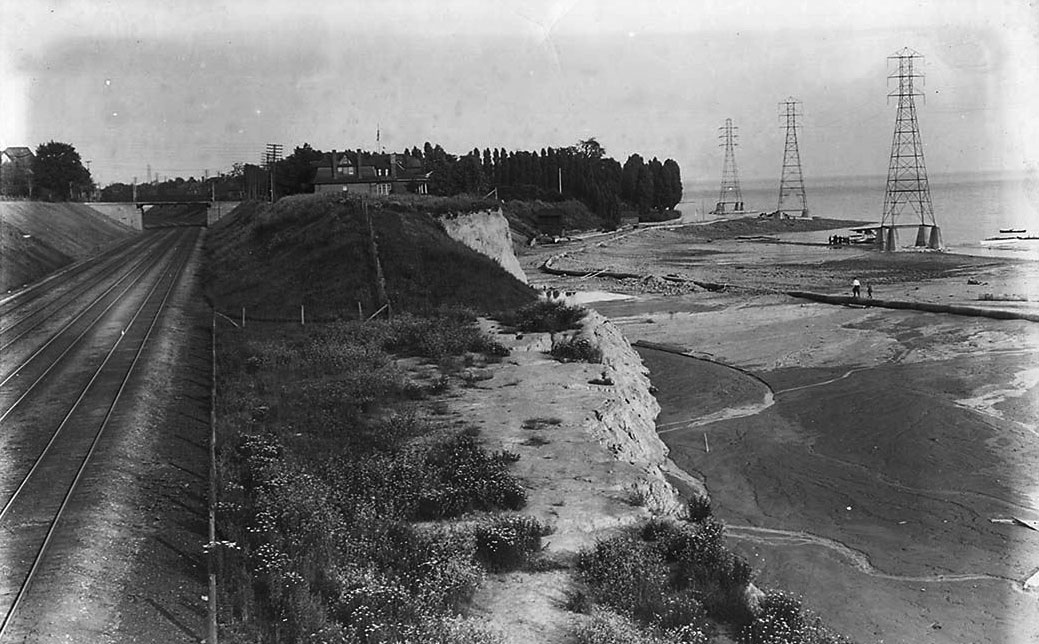
Eastern section in 1920 showing infill of lake.

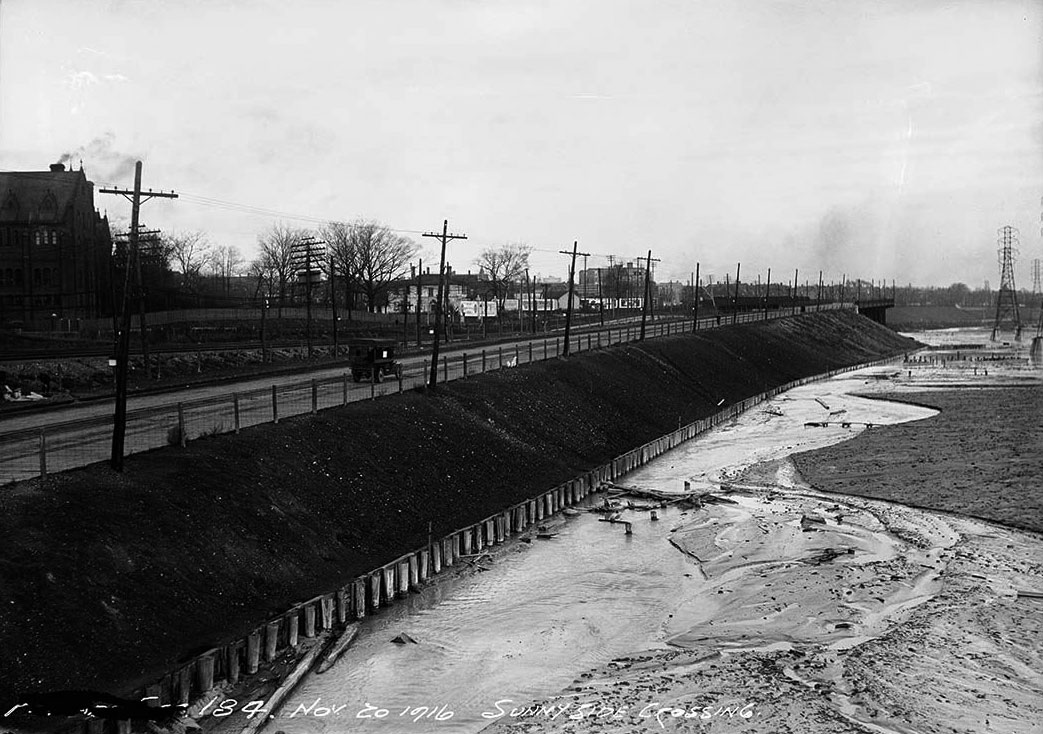
Central section in 1916 showing infill of lake.

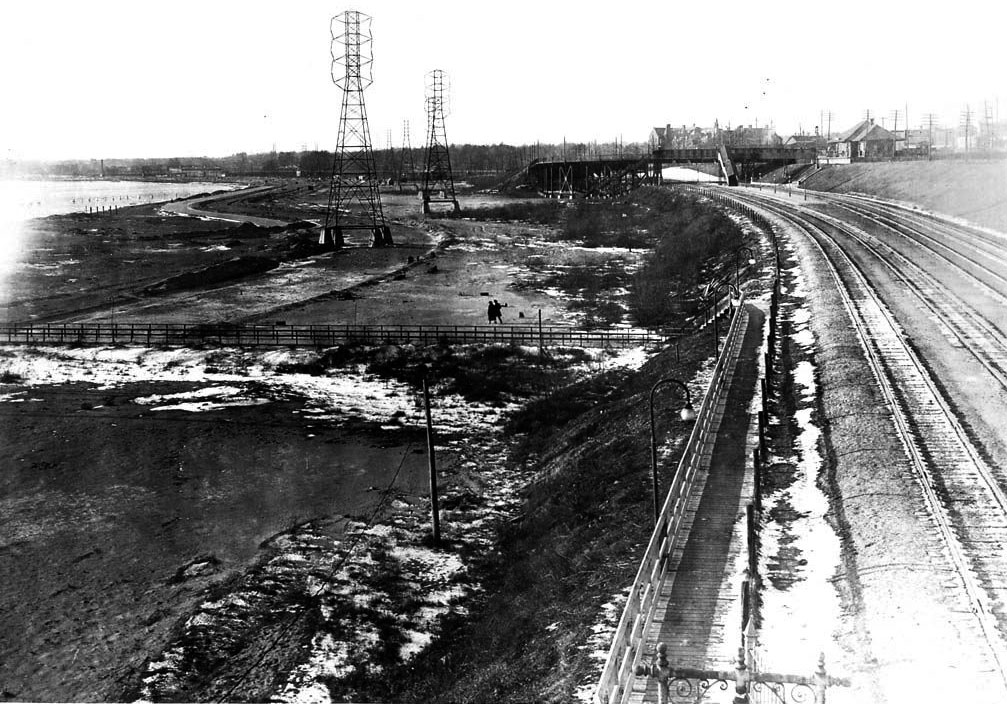
Dredging efforts circa 1920 showing Boulevard route and infill.

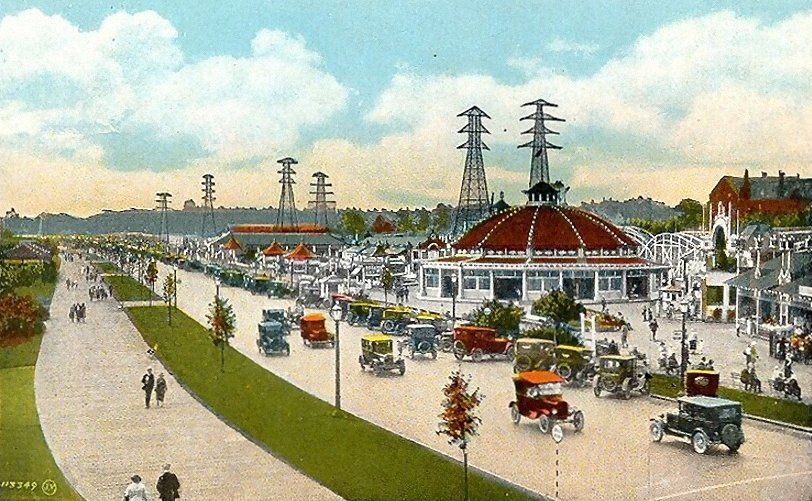
Sunnyside in 1931

=== Sunnyside Amusement Park ===
The Beach grew in popularity and the Harbour Commission leased land for rides on a temporary basis, eventually leading to the construction of the Sunnyside Amusement Park in 1922 and its permanently located rides. The Park's popularity grew, leading to more rides, night clubs and outdoor bandshells. Dean's Boat House was converted fully into the Palais Royale night club, the Sunnyside Pavilion into the Top Hat night club. The Sunnyside Pool (known also as the "Tank") was opened in 1925. Events such as ship burnings, tight-rope walkers and outdoor concerts made the Park a popular spot into the 1950s. Ambitious plans were planned to build a massive "Palace Pier" amusement area on a pier at the Humber River, although only a dance hall was ever built.

=== Marilyn Bell swim ===
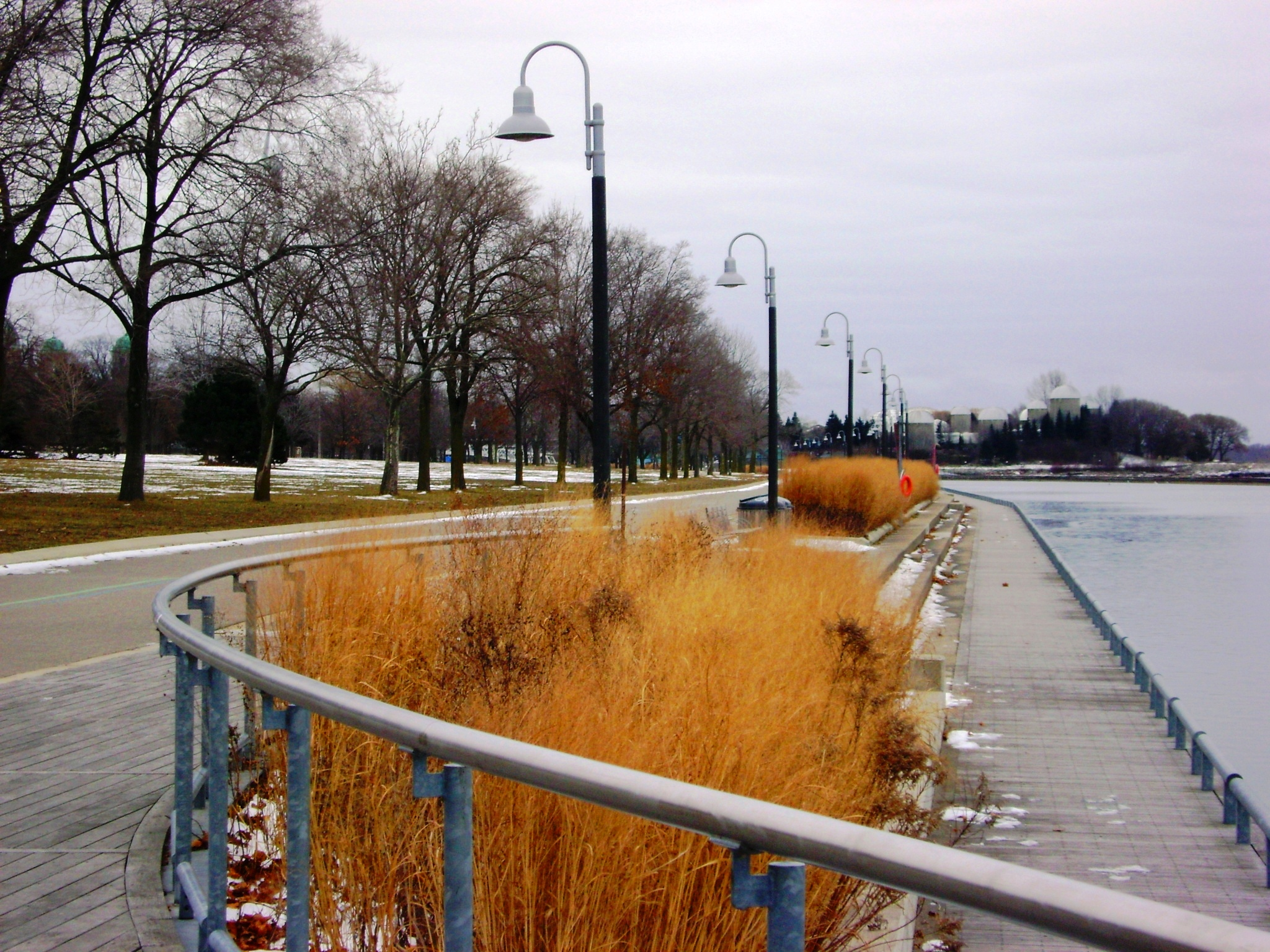
Marilyn Bell Park

In 1954, Marilyn Bell a 16-year-old marathon swimmer from Toronto became the first swimmer to swim across Lake Ontario. Her arrival at the foot of Roncesvalles was greeted by an estimated crowd of 300,000. She had joined a swim challenge sponsored by the CNE for another swimmer and was the only one of the three that attempted it to finish. Marilyn Bell Park at the foot of Jameson Avenue is dedicated in her honour.

=== Coming of the automobile ===
As suburbs to the west were built, and the Queen Elizabeth Way (QEW) to Fort Erie was built, the Lakeshore Road became very busy with traffic. The QEW eastern terminus connected with the existing Lakeshore Road at the Humber, meaning that travellers from points west would have to travel through Sunnyside to get to Queen Street to get to central Toronto. Transportation engineers studied the problem beginning in the 1940s. Plans were discussed with various routes for a highway along the lakeshore or as far north as Bloor Street. While the Amusement Park was popular, there was considerable opposition to its demolition. However, its popularity started to decline in the 1950s.

When the new "Metro" government of Toronto was formed in 1953, one of its first priorities was to build the Lakeshore Expressway, connecting the Queen Elizabeth Way to downtown Toronto in partnership with the provincial government. Under the leadership of Fred Gardiner, the project, which necessitated the demolition of the Park and a waterfront neighbourhood south of Jameson Avenue to the east, was pushed through, starting in 1955. The Toronto Harbour Commission cancelled all land leases in the area after some off-season fires and demolished all but the Palais Royale and the Sunnyside Bathing Pavilion and Pool. The highway required most of the Amusement Parklands along the railway right-of-way and the Lakeshore to Queen Street bridge was demolished. Where the road link from King, Queen and Roncesvalles existed, a narrow, high pedestrian bridge over all of the roads was built to link the foot of Roncesvalles to the waterfront.

At the same time, other roadways were built or expanded, including the new Queensway, with a dedicated streetcar right-of-way to the north, using some of the High Park lands on the north side of the railway right-of-way. The Lake Shore Boulevard was doubled in width to six lanes and redesigned into a 'scenic drive' style with the two directions separated by a grassy boulevard with no facilities for pedestrians. Today, a majority of the lands are given over to transportation uses.

What was left was converted to parklands, eventually subdivided into Budapest Park and Gzowski Park. Two children playgrounds were built and numerous trees were planted. In the 1960s, the parklands were transferred from the Harbour Commission to the City of Toronto government. While a small children's amusement park next to the Palais Royale on the waterfront was attempted in the 1960s, the amusement park idea was finally abandoned for good and the Centreville Amusement Park was built on the Toronto Islands.

The area north of the rail lines is no longer a connecting point for different modes of transportation. Sunnyside railway station closed in 1971 and the Sunnyside Bus Terminal, which handled intercity coach traffic, closed in 1990. The changes in traffic patterns and the closing of the amusement park also affected businesses in the Queen and Roncesvalles area, leading to much upheaval.

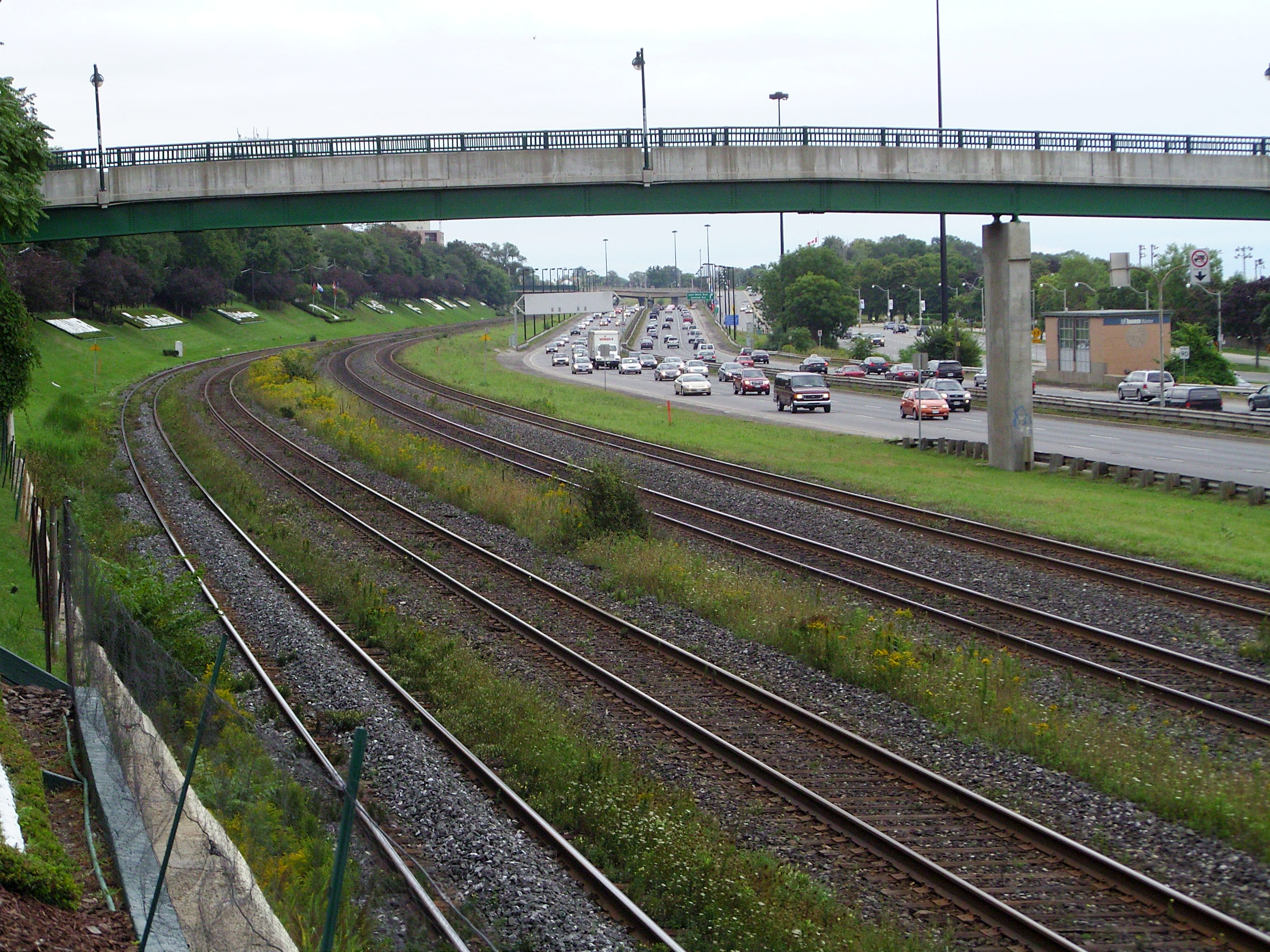
View east from Sunnyside Avenue, 2008 of the old railway station area.

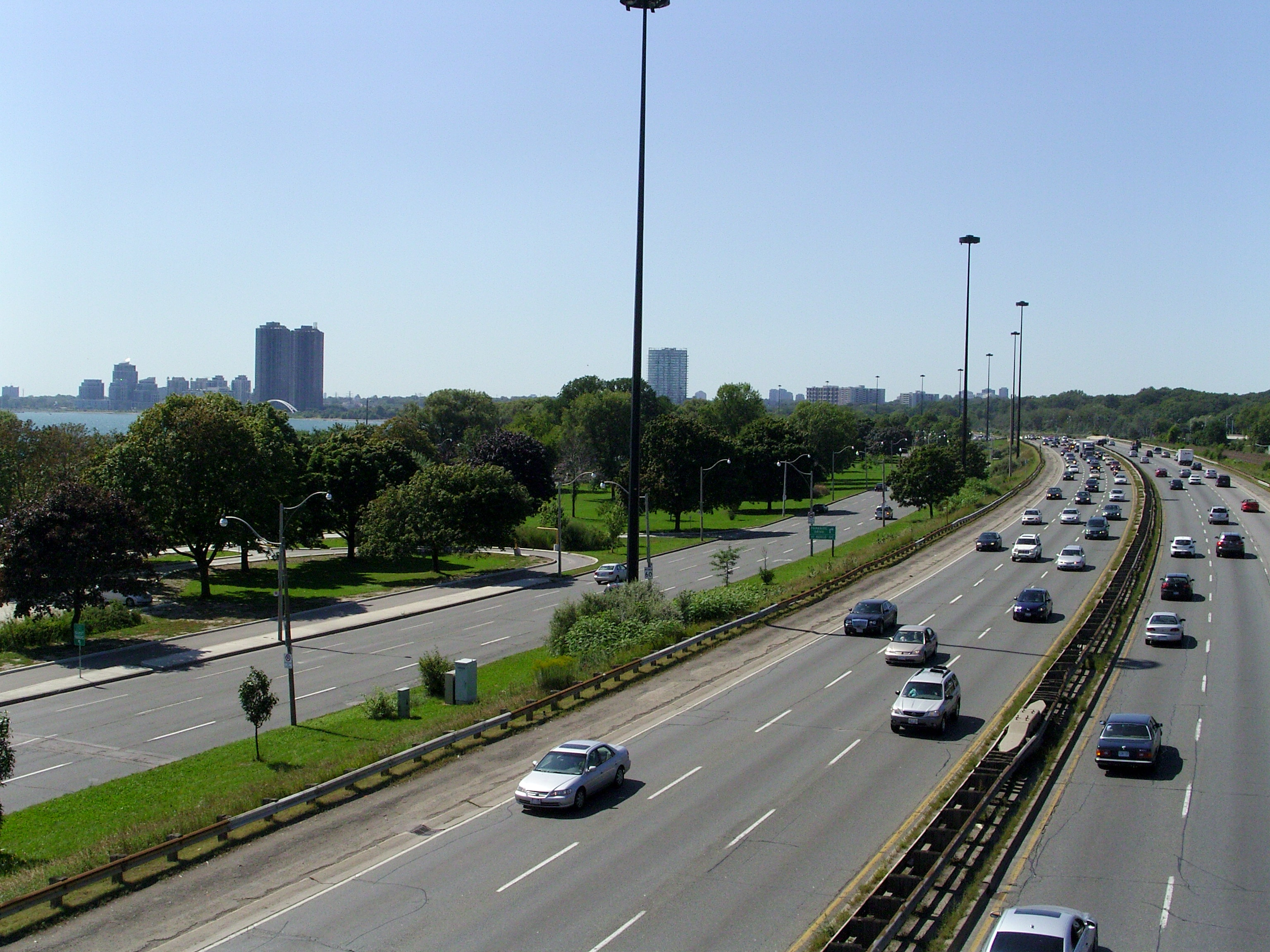
View west of the pedestrian bridge of the old amusement park lands.

=== Increasing neighbourhood interest ===
The changes in the area led to a decline in its usage. Increasing pollution of Lake Ontario also led to a decline in use of the waterfront for swimming. The boardwalk was removed. This changed in the 1970s, when local environmental groups organized regular clean-ups of the waterfront, removing trash from the lakeshore. Interest in cleaning the water to allow swimming in the Lake again was raised. The Bathing Pavilion was renovated in 1980 and its cafe became a popular local spot to enjoy the waterfront. A pedestrian bridge was built at the foot of Jameson Avenue, restoring a link to the waterfront that had been lost in the demolition of the waterfront neighbourhood. In the 1990s, the Martin Goodman Trail for cyclists was inaugurated, including a pedestrian bridge over the Humber. A new boardwalk was built out of recycled plastic planks along the water.

In the first decade of the 21st century, there has been renewed local political interest in the waterfront. Neighbourhood associations raised concerns about private land usage including proposals to lease more waterfront by the Boulevard Club and other organizations. Concerns were raised about the Palais Royale renovation and subsequent parking lot development. The building of the Gardiner and the road expansions effectively put a barrier between the neighbourhoods and the waterfront, and this remains unresolved.

In the 2010s, Dowling Avenue's connection to Lake Shore Boulevard was closed. The Dowling Avenue bridge over the Gardiner was demolished. The bridge was replaced with a pedestrian bridge to give another connection from Parkdale to the waterfront.

== Points of interest ==
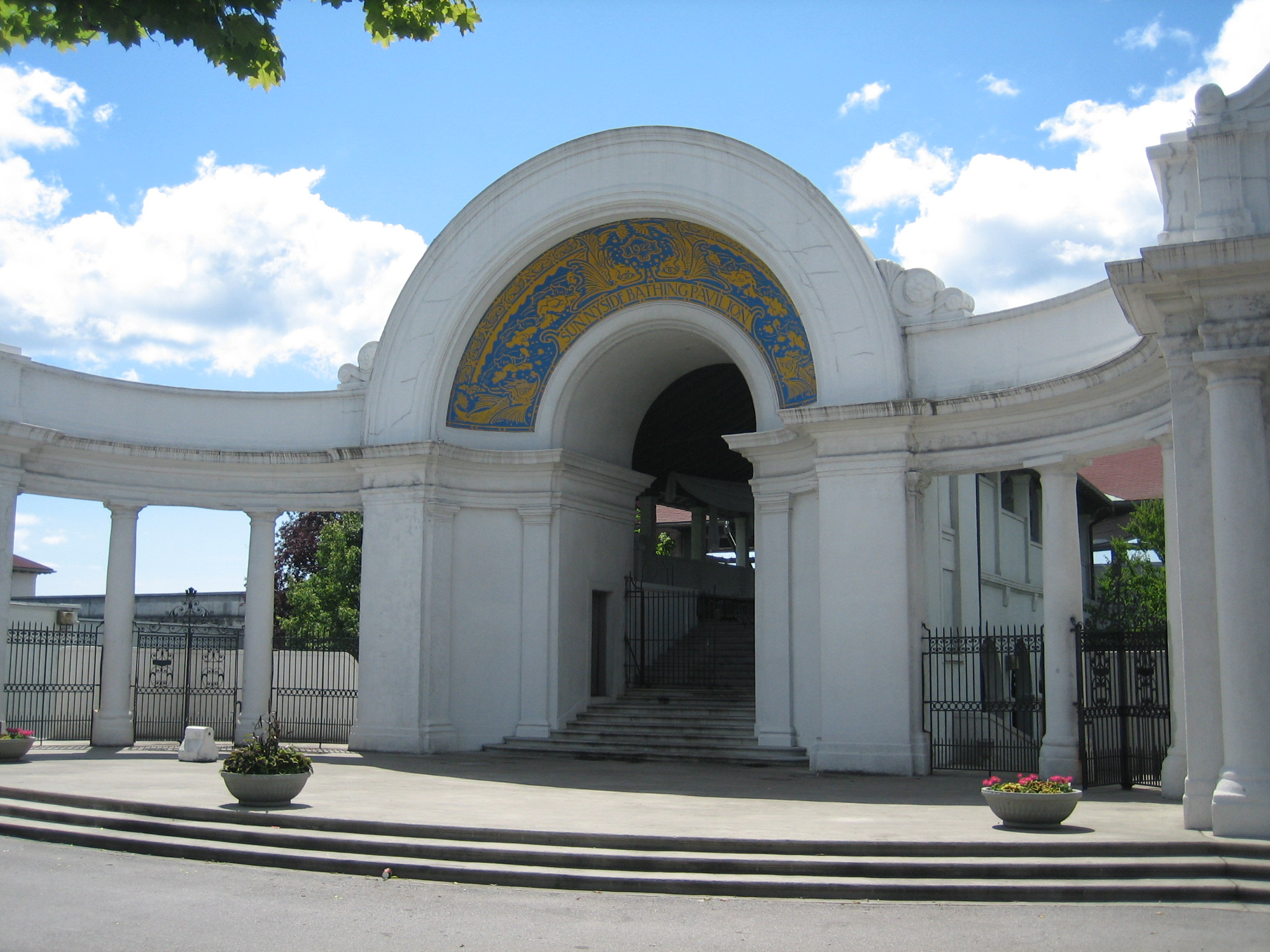
The Sunnyside Bathing Pavilion

=== Buildings ===
The Sunnyside Bathing Pavilion was renovated in 1980 and now houses a cafe with a patio on the boardwalk and a tea garden. The beach to the south of the pavilion now hosts beach volleyball. The Pavilion and surrounding park host regular multicultural events and a Canada Day celebration. The pool was rededicated as the 'Gus Ryder Pool', named after the founder and coach of the Lakeshore Swim Club of New Toronto. At the foot of Roncesvalles, the former nightclub Palais Royale is operated on a special events rental basis.

East of Roncesvalles is the Boulevard Club sports complex. Founded as the Parkdale Canoe Club, the club also has several tennis courts along with its boating activities. Further east is the Toronto Argonaut Rowing Club, the Toronto Sail and Canoeing Club and a Royal Canadian Legion branch.

At the foot of Ellis, the park is now the site of a relocated Joy Oil heritage gas station from the 1930s. It has been moved from its original location north of Lake Shore Boulevard to the south side just east of the parking lot.

At the western end of Gzowski Park is the Queen Elizabeth Way Monument, relocated from its location between the east and west lanes of the then Queen Elizabeth Way, which had its starting point from the Humber River. The monument was relocated to the park and rededicated by Queen Elizabeth in 1989.

=== Boardwalk/Martin Goodman Trail ===
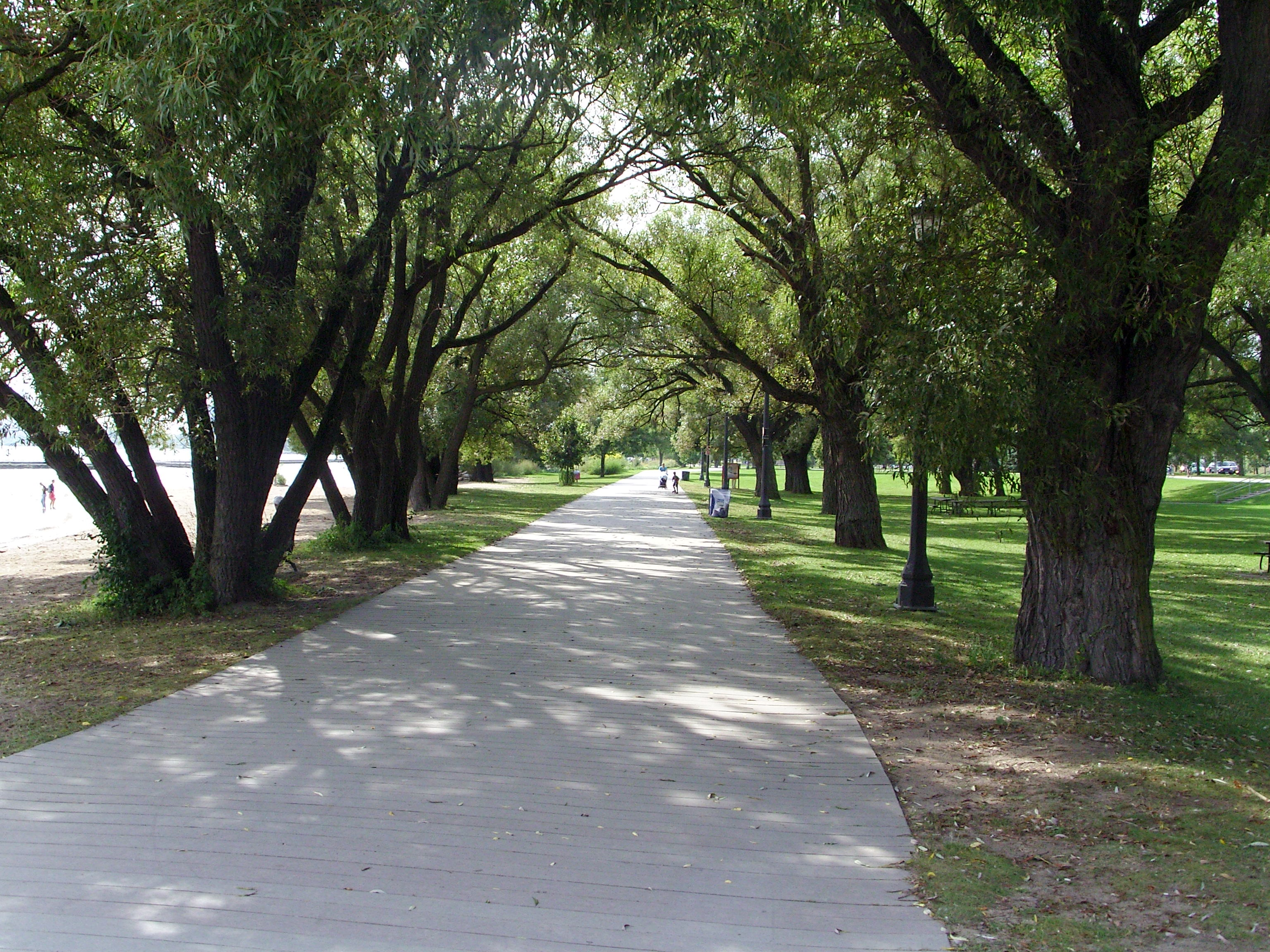
Boardwalk, looking west of Sunnyside Bathing Pavilion

The first boardwalk was built in the 1910s by the Harbour Commission, in the amusement park area. In the 1930s, the boardwalk was re-constructed as a make-work project and extended from the Humber to Jameson Avenue to the east. This was eventually removed in the 1960s. In the 1990s, a new boardwalk, constructed of planks of recycled plastic was built along the shore from the foot of Roncesvalles west to the Humber River. The boardwalk is for pedestrians only.

The Martin Goodman Trail recreational pathway path follows the path of the old boardwalk, alongside Lake Shore Boulevard. Between Roncesvalles and Dowling, fencing separates the pathway from the roadway. The pathway is for mixed-use, allowing cyclists.

These two pathways meet at the Humber River mouth where the Humber Bay Arch Bridge was constructed to cross the Humber River to lakeshore parks to the west of the river.

=== Parks ===
The lakefront has several named parks along different sections.

Sunnyside's western section, from the Humber River to west of the Bathing Pavilion is named in honour of Casimir Gzowski, a pioneer engineer in the building of railways in Canada. The park houses a monument built in the 1960s that has displays of his personal history. The park contains a children's playground and picnicking areas, a food concession stand, a stormwater catchment pond, and a leash-free dog area. The dog off-leash area is located to the east of the mouth of the Humber River.

In 1964, to commemorate the Hungarian Revolution of 1956, the parklands between the Palais Royale and the Sunnyside Pavilion were named Budapest Park. The area has a major monument to the conflict, picnic lands, a children's playground and a wading pool. A small parkette located east of the Boulevard Club with a small beach is named Vimy Ridge Parkette.

Further east is Marilyn Bell Park, near the location where Marilyn Bell came ashore after her historic Lake Ontario swim.

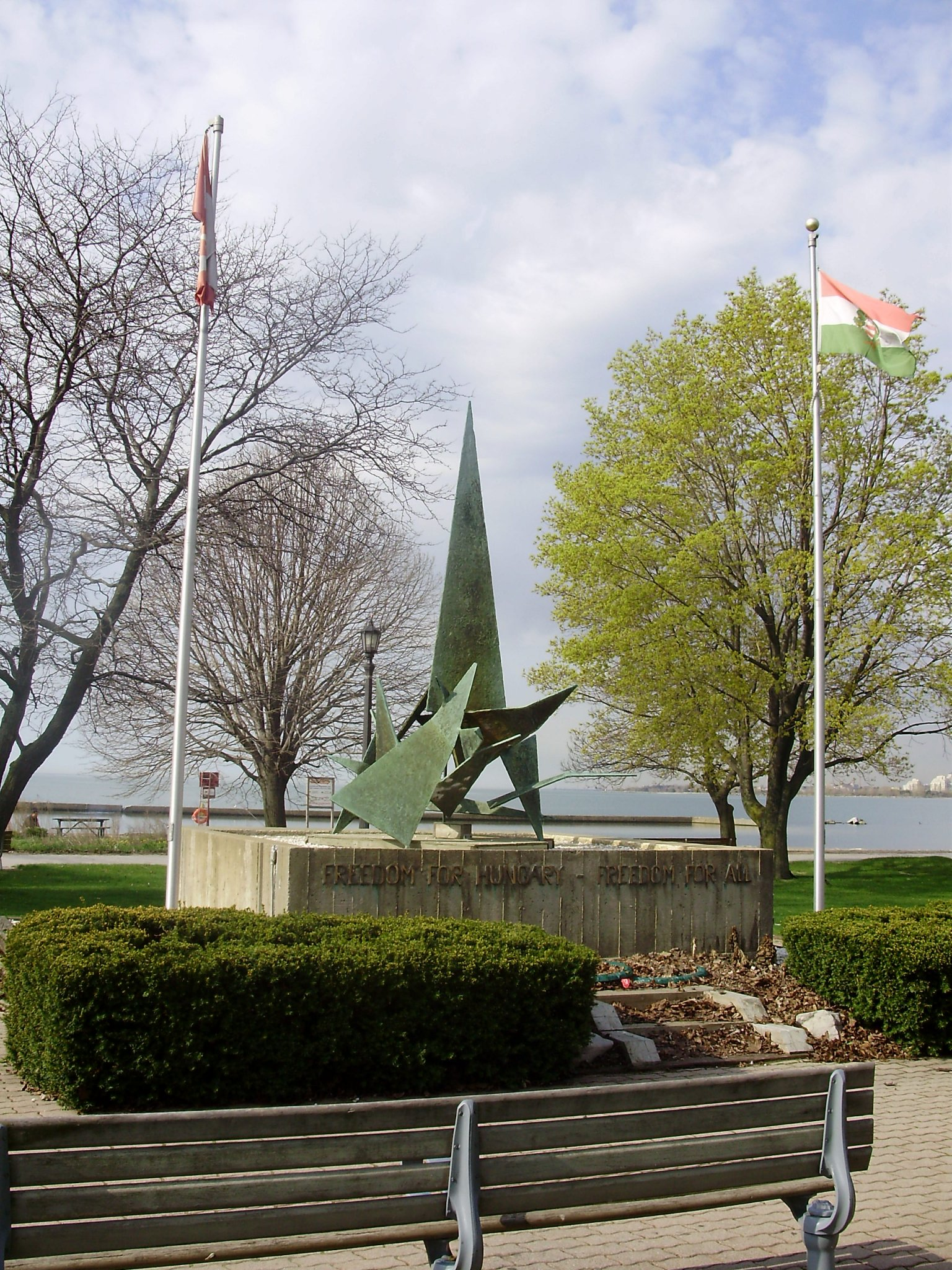
This Budapest Park monument commemorates the Hungarian Revolution of 1956.

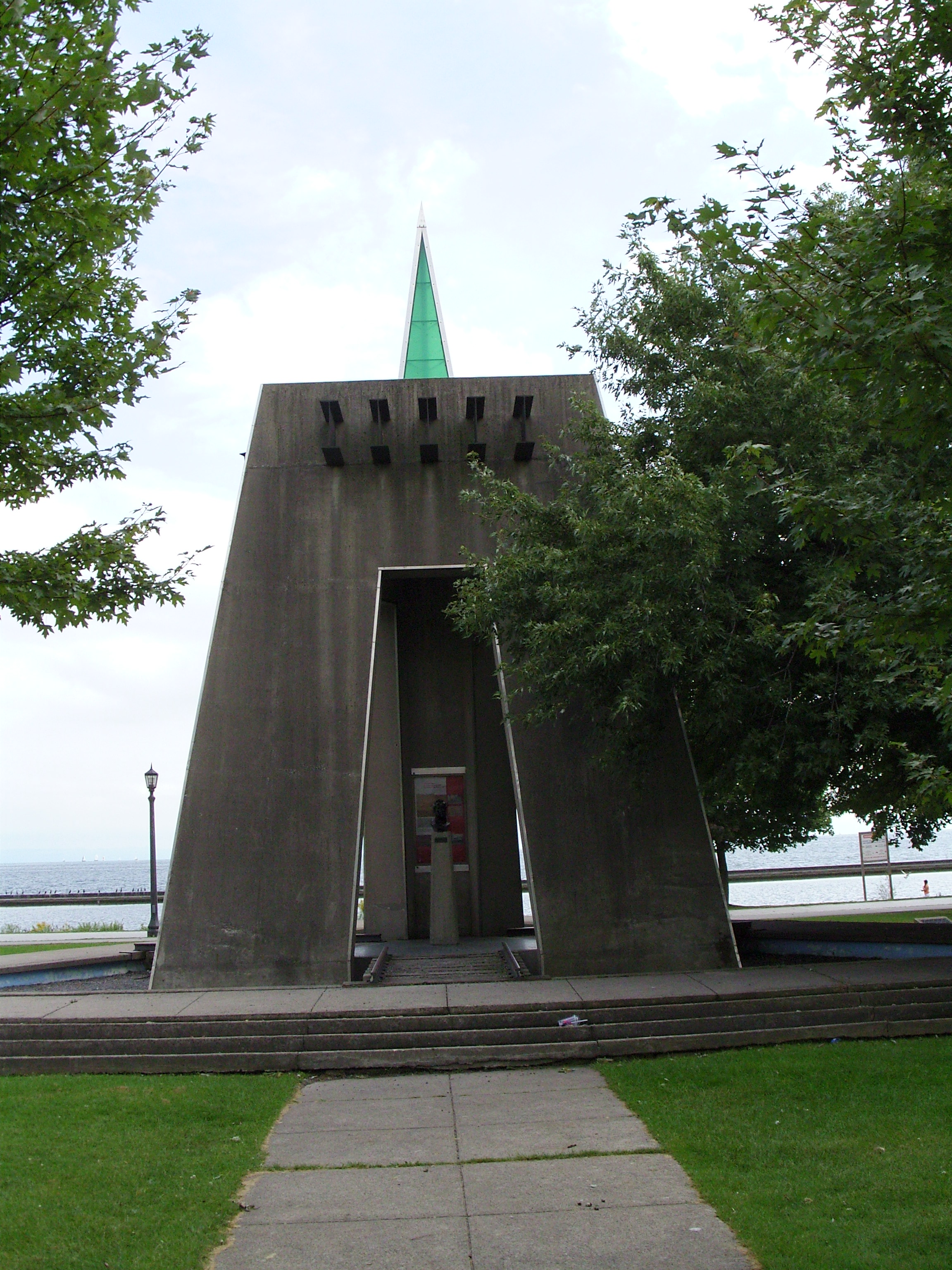
Gzowski Monument

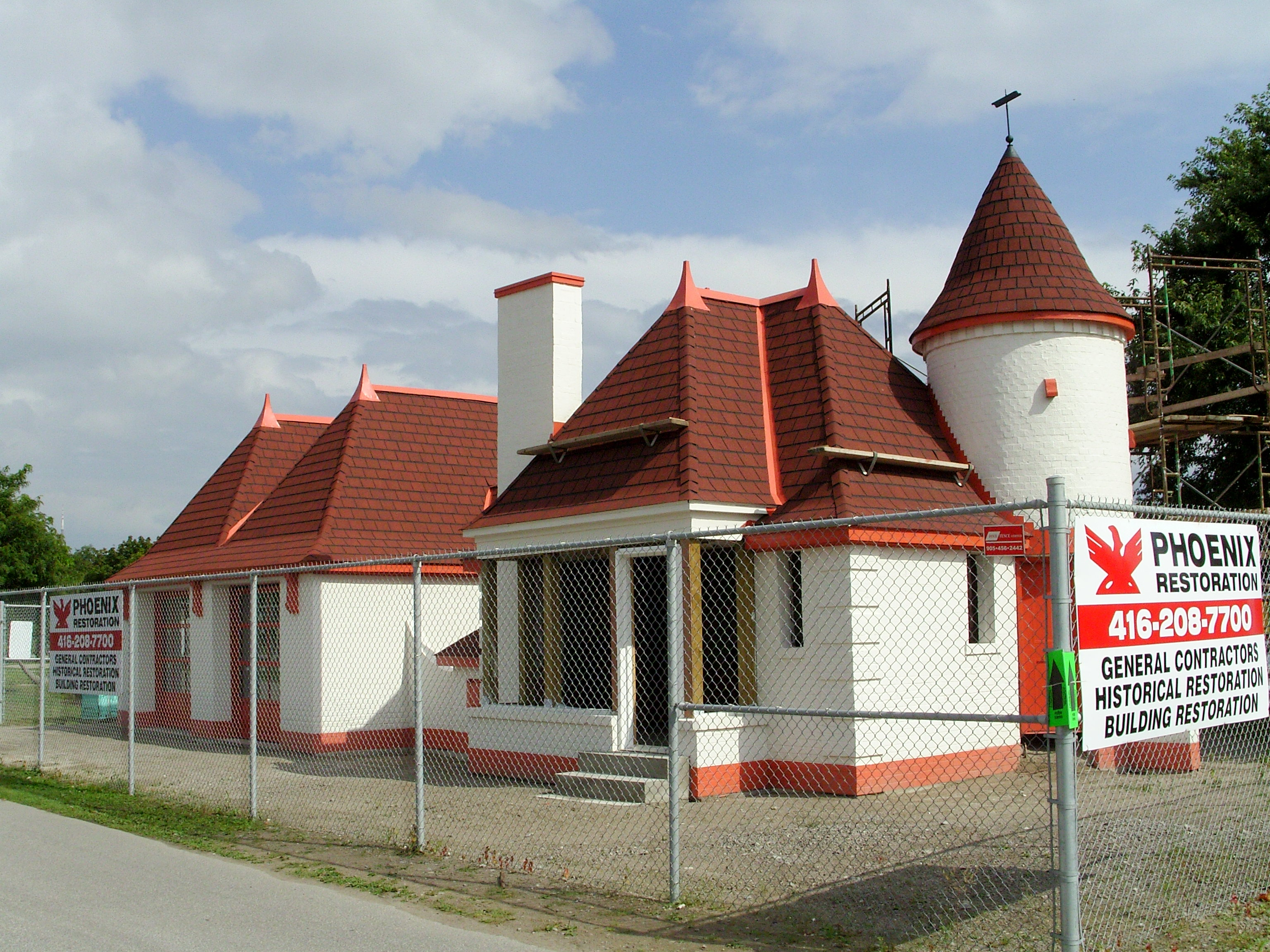
The old 'Joy Oil' 1930s-era Gas Station.

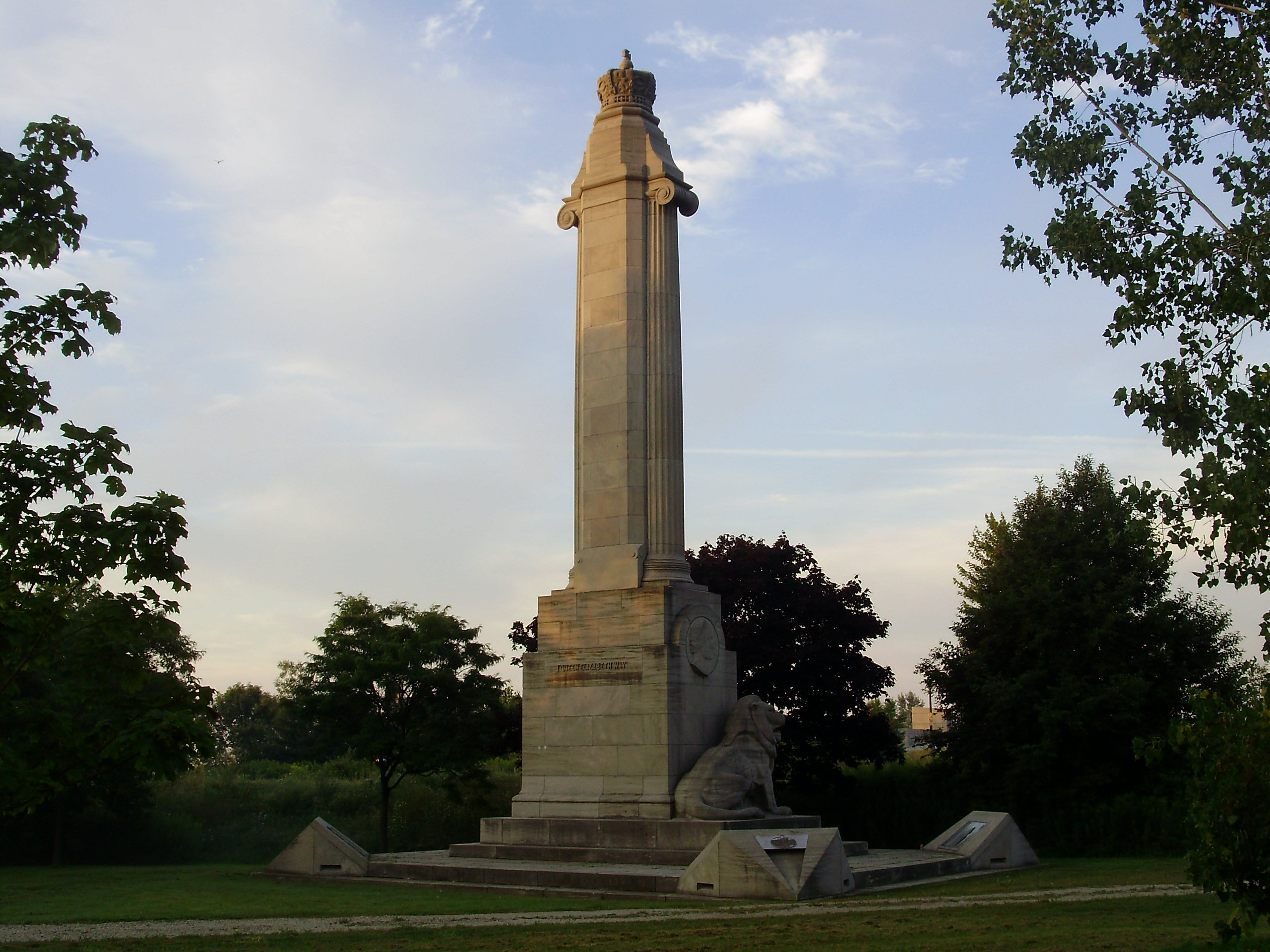
The Queen Elizabeth Way Monument

=== Sunnyside Bike Park ===
The Sunnyside Bike Park is a recreational bicycling facility providing legal dirt biking activities in the area. It is situated on the land north of Lake Shore Boulevard between Ellis Avenue and Colborne Lodge Drive, west of a stormwater pond. It has several different sections: a skills zone, pump tracks, jump lines and a "drop and wall ride". The park opened in July 2014.

=== Boating and watercourse ===
Sailboats during a race on Humber Bay.

A protected waterway from Ontario Place to the Humber River exists behind the 1912 breakwater along the full length. In 2006, a special watercourse was built at the foot of Jameson Avenue at Marilyn Bell Park for a Dragon Boat Championships. At 600 metres, it is too short for other boating races and may be extended to 1300 metres in length.

The waters of Humber Bay are popular for boating. Several canoe, rowing and dragon boating clubs exist. The Boulevard Club, the former Parkdale Canoe Club operates a large facility to the east of Roncesvalles Avenue with a marina and tennis courts. The Argonaut Rowing Club is headquartered at the foot of Dowling Avenue on the waterfront and trains in the area.

=== Beaches ===
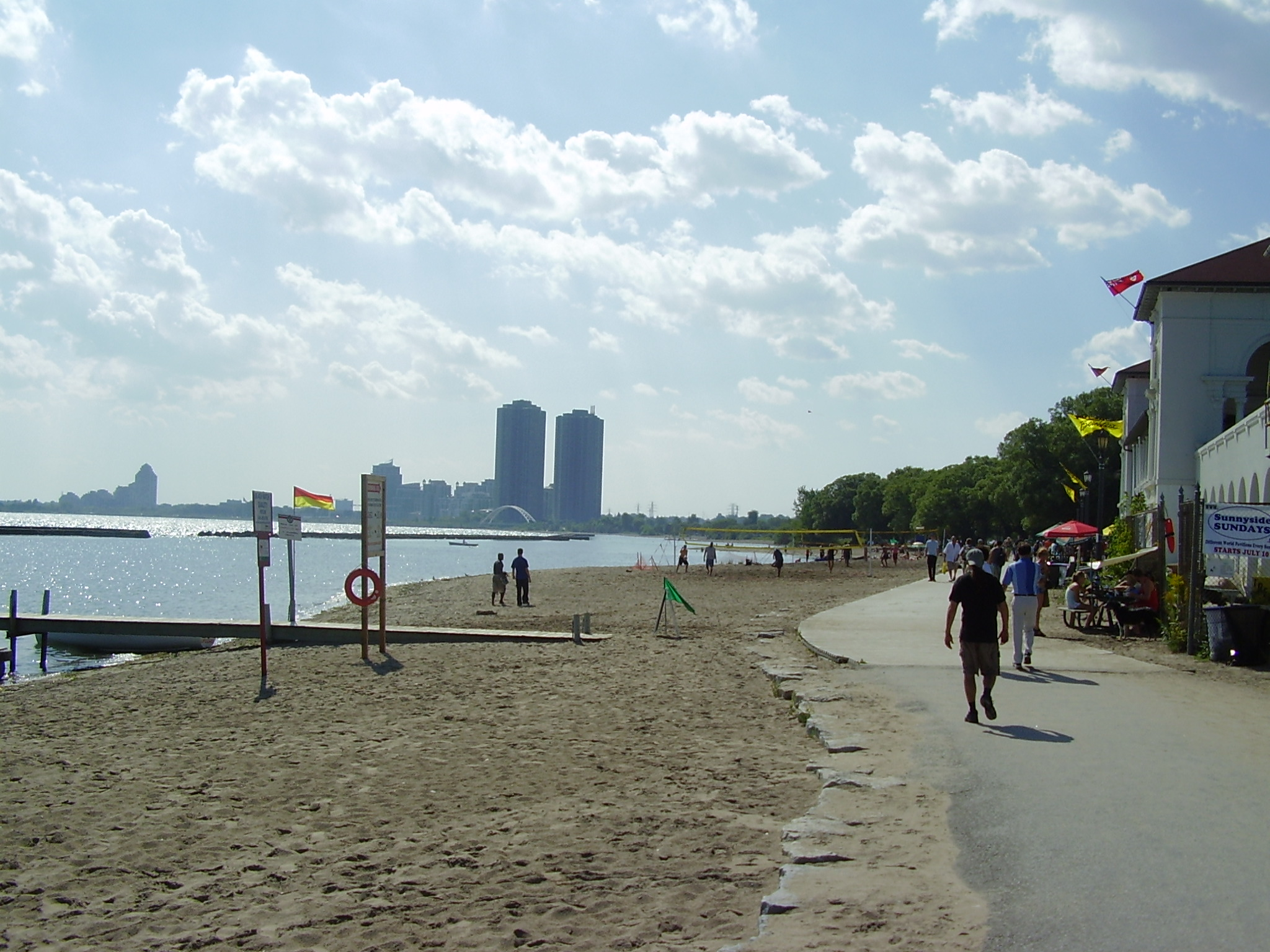
A view of the beach, looking west

Sunnyside Beach, Toronto, July 1924

There are several beaches along the Sunnyside waterfront. A small beach exists to the east of the Boulevard Club. At its easternmost point, a small area of the original bluff still exists. This is the last vestige of the original shoreline in the area.

The main beach is located to the south of the Bathing Pavilion. There is room for several courts of beach volleyball. Paddleboards are available for rental here. A dragon boat club exists at the site. The water is safe for swimming, except after major rainfalls, when swimming is closed for several days due to high bacteria counts attributed to run-off into the Humber River. The beach is open for swimming most of the summer, although Lake Ontario's water temperature does not rise above 25 degrees Celsius.

The water at the beach was long considered too polluted for swimming, but efforts are being made to reduce pollution further. A major tunnel was built to contain most of the storm water that was polluting the river, diverting the water to wastewater treatment. Two storm water management ponds were built north of Lake Shore Boulevard West in 2007. Water conditions are indicated by flags posted along the beach.

In 2012, the City of Toronto water department proposed using landfill from soil excavated during the construction of the Eglinton Crosstown LRT to construct a chain of artificial islands near the mouth of the Humber River to divert its flow away from the beach. Heavy rains can flush pollutants down the river, temporarily making the beaches near its mouth unsafe for swimming. The proposed Humber Islands would extend approximately one kilometre off shore, and would be connected by an underwater berm, directing the river's flow into deep water.

== Plans ==
The City of Toronto government City Council has commissioned a study of this area of the waterfront entitled the "Western Waterfront Public Consultation". Plans include the realignment of Lake Shore Boulevard West to free up space for pedestrian, recreational and cycling uses.

== References and notes ==
- Filey, Mike (1996). I Remember Sunnyside. Dundurn Press. ISBN 1-55002-274-1.
- Toronto Harbour Commission Public Affairs Department (1985). Toronto Harbour – The Passing Years. Toronto, Ontario: Toronto Harbour Commissioners.

== See also ==
- Palais Royale
- Sunnyside Amusement Park
- Toronto waterfront
