= Humber Islands =

The Humber Islands were a proposed plan to use landfill to build artificial islands off the mouth of the Humber River in Toronto, Ontario, Canada. The islands would have diverted water flowing from the Humber that, at certain times of the year makes it unsafe to swim on beaches east of the mouth.

The proposal was first drafted in 2002. The Globe and Mail reported the proposal was "dusted off" again in 2012, when the city was renewing efforts make sure it was consistently safe to swim at all of Toronto's eleven beaches. Heavy rains wash pollutants down the Humber River making it unsafe to swim at Sunnyside Beach and Marie Curtis Beach.

The Islands would be connected by an underwater berm and would have formed a chain that extended about one kilometre into the lake. The Islands would have required 1,800,000 cubic metres of landfill. Toronto is building a 19 kilometres (12 mi) light rail line, with an 11 kilometres (6.8 mi) segment, and in 2012, planners suggested the waste soil from the tunnels and stations could supply close to half the soil needed for the islands. Some commentators were concerned the soil shouldn't be used as landfill in Lake Ontario due to fears of contamination. Other asserted the waste from the tunnels would be too deep to have been contaminated and the regions had not been used for heavy industry.

The city estimated it could collect $18 million in tipping fees.
