= Joy Gas Stations =

Gas stations in Toronto, Canada

Coordinates: 43.635605°N 79.46595°W

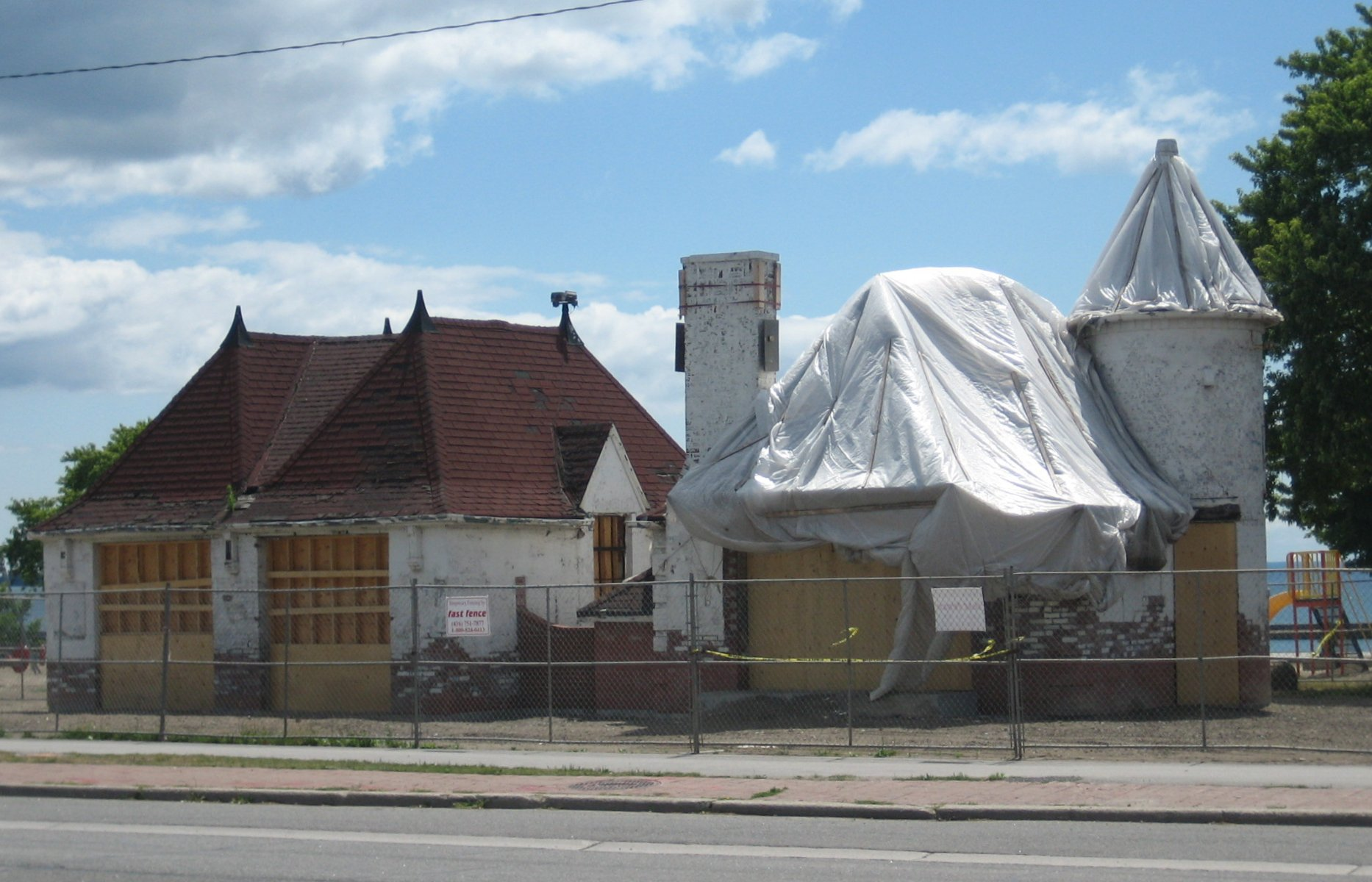
The last of the Joy Gas Stations was in considerable disrepair in 2007, just prior to its restoration

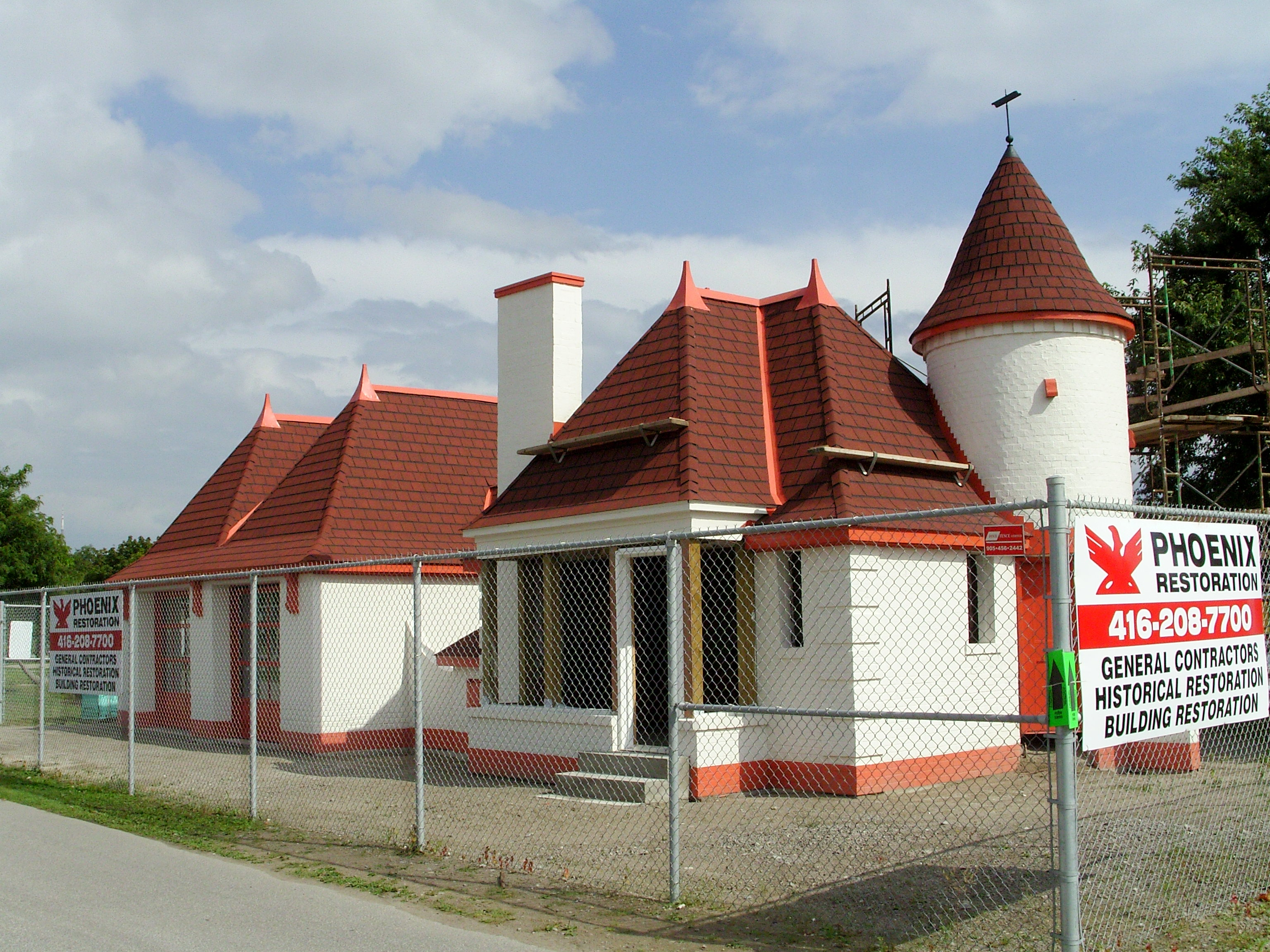
After restoration

Joy Gas Stations operated uniquely designed stations in Toronto, Ontario, Canada, in the 1930s for the Joy Oil Company Limited. The stations are examples of the Château style of architecture, a style that was promoted as a uniquely Canadian architectural form in the 1930s.

Of the 16 stations built in the Greater Toronto Area, only one station survives today, at Lake Shore Boulevard West and Windermere Avenue built in 1937. In April 2007, the City of Toronto moved part of the station from the site to a location across the street at Sir Casimir Gzowski Park. The station was restored and will be repurposed as an eatery and tourist information centre once the current contract with the nearby vendor expires after 2016.

As of 2020, the station sits vacant. "It was restored a dozen years ago by the city at a cost of nearly $400,000 but has been vacant and fenced off ever since, with plans floated along the way that never panned out." The city expects it to re-open soon.

== Lost stations ==
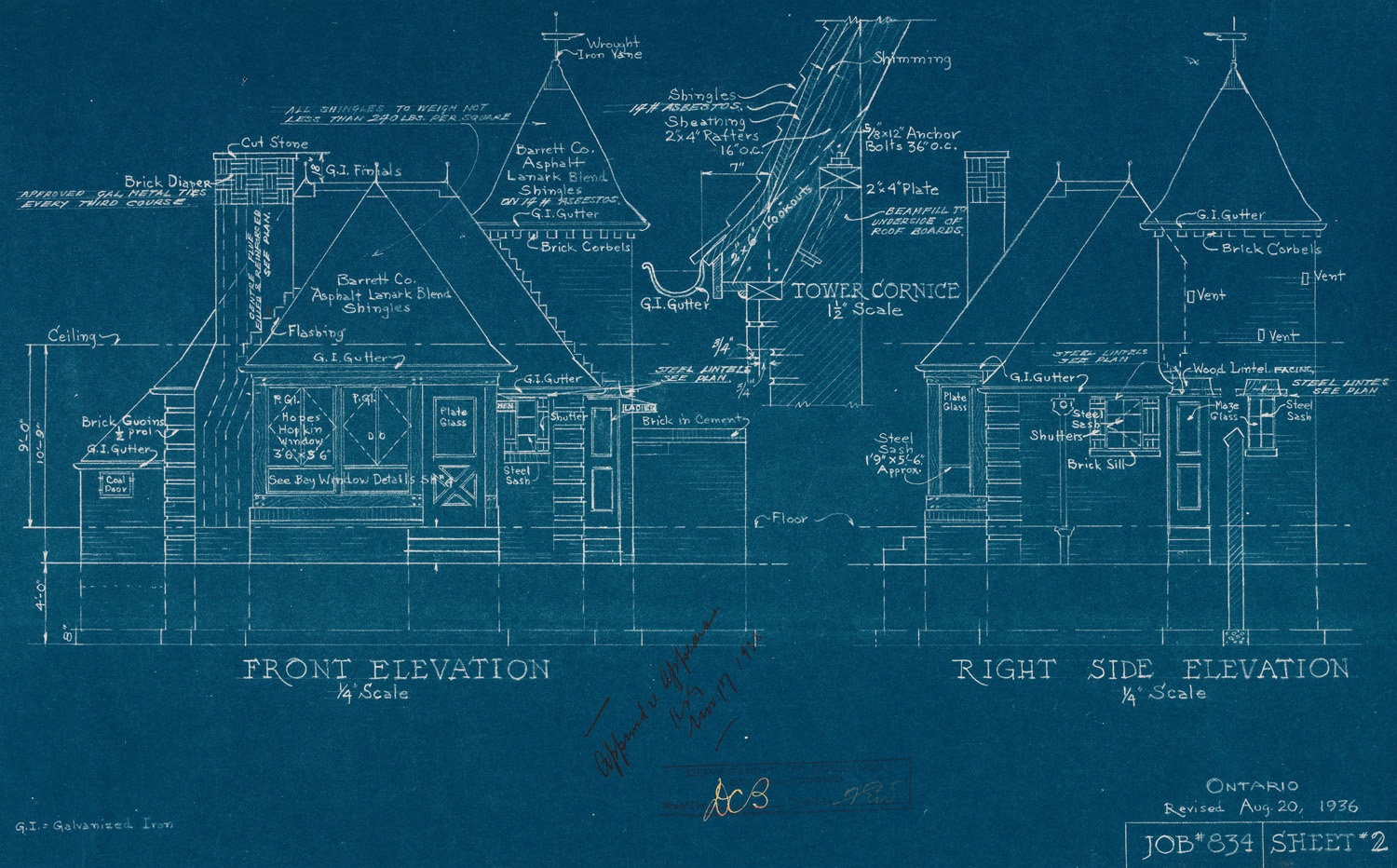
Blueprint for the Joy station at 910 Lake Shore Boulevard West, Toronto

The Joy Gas Station at 1947 Bloor Street West was built in 1937 on the north-west corner of High Park. It was demolished in 1986 to make way for a commercial complex by developer Zenon Greszta, a development which sparked opposition by local residents. It had been designated as a historic building, but its protection expired in July 1986.

A station existed on Kingston Road in Scarborough has since been demolished.

A station at 910 Lake Shore Boulevard West was demolished in 1977 and replaced with the current Esso station.

A station in Scarborough was demolished in the 1990s.

Other locations included:

- 985 Danforth Avenue at Donlands Avenue
- 429 Roncesvalles Avenue
- 789 St. Clair Avenue West
- 317 Parliament Street
- Queen Street East near Pape Avenue
- 3169 Yonge Street, north of Lawrence Avenue
- Bedford Road and Davenport Road
- Eglinton and Avenue Road (NW corner)
- 5675 Decarie Boulevard, Montreal, Quebec (circa 1944 to 1951), later demolished to make way for a drive-in branch of the Bank of Montreal (itself later closed)
- Lake Shore Boulevard West and Stadium Road
- 1947 Bloor Street West
- Bloor Street West and Jane (NW corner)

== See also ==
Media related to Joy Gas Stations at Wikimedia Commons

- Sunnyside, Toronto
