= Sunnyside Bathing Pavilion =

Public pavilion in Toronto, Canada

Coordinates: 43.637737°N 79.456301°W

General information
- Architectural style: Italianate architecture
- Opened: 28 June 1922
- Cost: 300,000 Canadian dollar

Sunnyside Bathing Pavilion is a landmark public pavilion in the Sunnyside lakefront area of Toronto, Ontario, Canada. Built in 1922, its original function was to provide changing facilities for swimming in Lake Ontario, however lake conditions were often too cold and an adjoining public swimming pool was built in 1925. The Pavilion was renovated in 1980 to provide updated changing facilities and a café along the beach and a garden.

== History ==
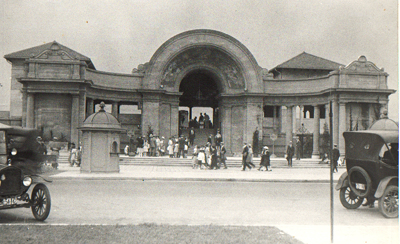
1922

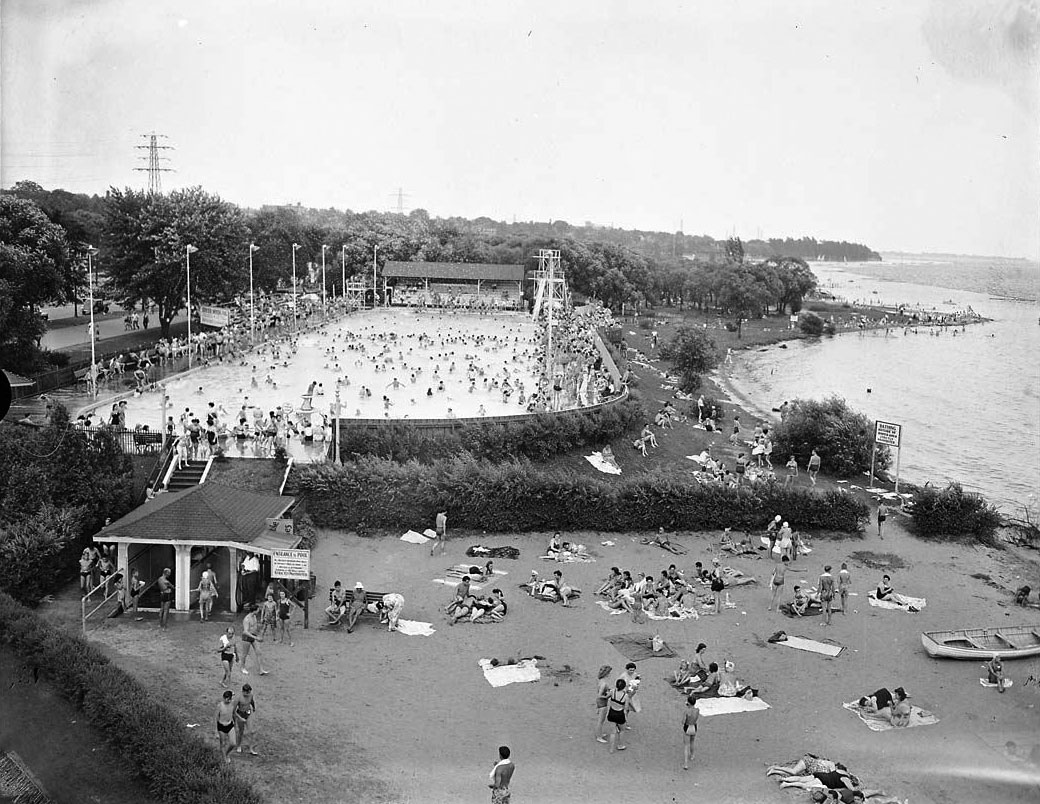
1940s

By the 1920s, swimming at the foot of Roncesvalles Avenue had been popular for over thirty years, as there was a swimming area near a pumping station. This changed in 1913 when the pumping station was demolished to make way for the bridge connecting Lakeshore Road and the King/Queen/Roncesvalles intersection. A staircase was built for pedestrians to walk down to the shoreline. A slide was installed for bathers to slide down into the water. By 1920, this area was filled in and the beach was moved farther to the south. For the year 1921, the beach was recorded as having over 302,525 visitors.

On June 28, 1922, Toronto Mayor Charles A. Maguire opened the Sunnyside Bathing Pavilion to help bathers change for the swim in the lake. The building, constructed of concrete, cost CA$300,000 ($5.35 million in 2025 dollars). Each wing held an outdoor changing area, lockers and showers, the women's side on the east, and men's side on the west. It offered over 7,700 lockers for patrons, a roof garden for 400. Admission fees were 25¢ for adults and 15¢ for children, and bathing suits and towels could be rented. In the center was a staircase leading to an upper terrace which overlooked the change areas leading to a rear terrace which ran the full length of the building and overlooked the beach.

The building was designed by Alfred Chapman who had designed the Princes' Gates and the Ontario Government Building at Exhibition Place for the Canadian National Exhibition (CNE). The bathing pavilion design was based on the bathing pavilion at Lynn Beach in Massachusetts.

The Pavilion was the site of the first 'Miss Toronto' beauty pageant in 1926.

=== The 'Tank' ===
On July 29, 1925, due to coldness of the lake during the preceding two summers, the Sunnyside Pool, nicknamed the 'Tank', was opened beside the Bathing Pavilion to the east. It measured 300 feet (91 m) by 75 feet (23 m) and could accommodate 2,000 swimmers. At the time of construction, the pool was considered the largest outdoor swimming pool in the world. Admission fees were 35¢ for adults, 10¢ for children.

The 'Tank' was especially popular with children as special streetcar runs were made to take children to the Pool directly from around the City. When built, the pool had a diving tower and bleachers on the east end. The tower was replaced with a simple diving board before 1980, and the diving board itself was eventually removed. The bleachers have been replaced by an equipment building.

The pool was closed for renovations for most of the summer of 2010. Intended to reopen in July, the pool reopened for a short period at the end of August, using a temporary water heater. A June storm destroyed some pool equipment, including custom pool heaters for the pool. The pool was repaired and restored heating to the water.

== Renovated facility ==
The Sunnyside Bathing Pavilion was renovated in 1980. The outdoor lockers and changing areas were demolished and new changing rooms were built. The pool was rededicated as the 'Gus Ryder Pool', named after Marilyn Bell's coach, the founder and coach of the Lakeshore Swim Club of New Toronto.

=== East wing ===
The east wing of the pavilion, which formerly held the outdoor women's changing area became a new enclosed changing facility with new men's and women's changing areas. The former entrance from the archway area was closed and a new entrance was cut in the north wall to enter the changing area.

=== West wing ===
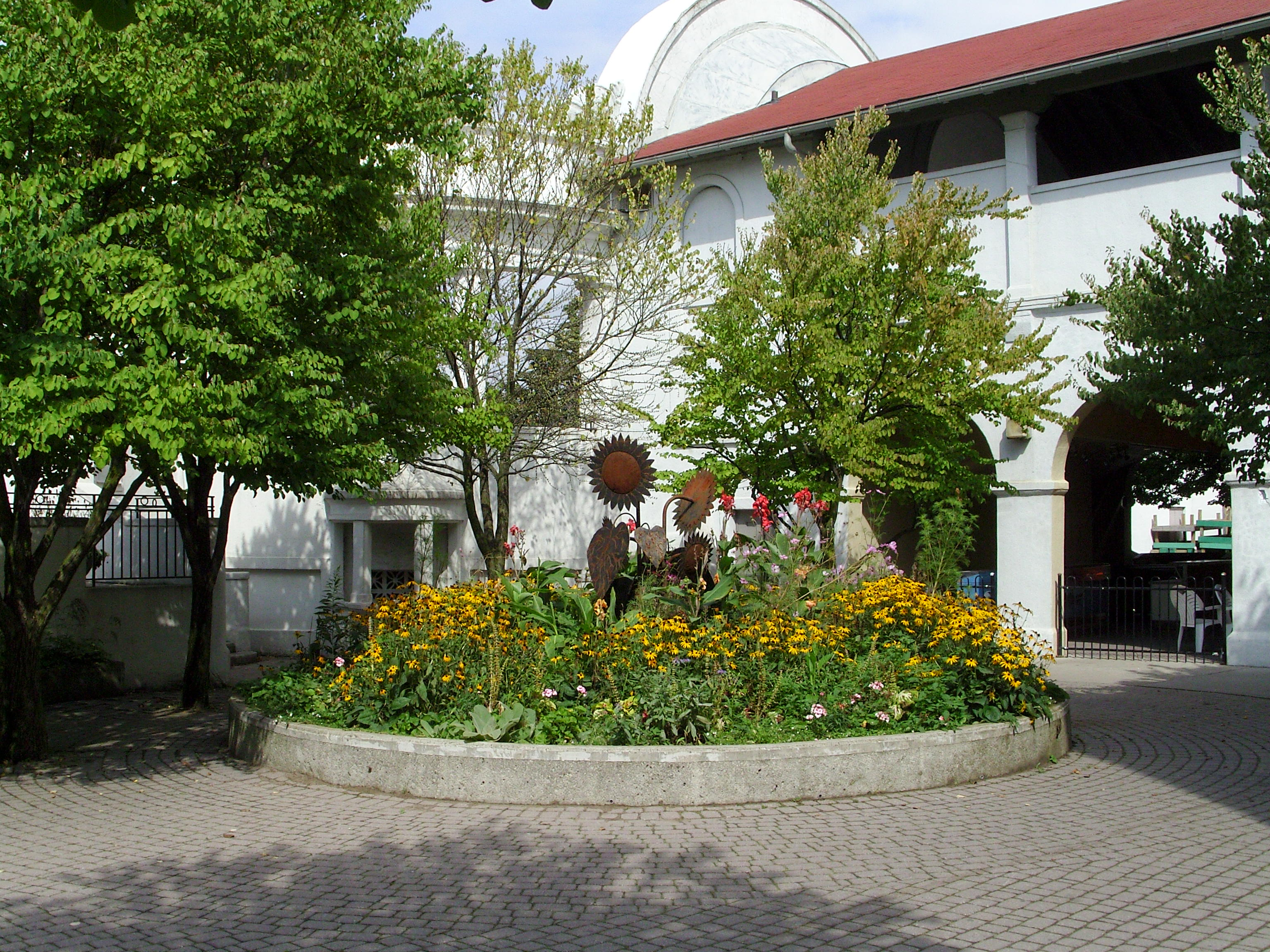
West wing tea garden

The west wing, which formerly held the men's changing area, now houses a cafe with patio on the boardwalk and a tea garden. An opening was made in the western wall opening onto the adjacent parklands.

=== Central section and upstairs ===
The central section and upstairs terrace is used as a public space for functions, such as wedding receptions, catered by the cafe below.

=== Boardwalk frontage ===
The south side of the facility is home to the cafe, and fronts onto the boardwalk and the beach. The cafe is open from spring to fall.

== Activities ==
Sunnyside Pool is open for swimming during the summer, starting in June and ending in September. During heat alerts, the pool stays open later in the evening. The pool has regular swimming instruction leading to "Bronze Medallion" certification. Swimming at the pool is free, however there is a charge for instruction programs. To the east of the pool is an outdoor wading pool and a children's playground. South of the pavilion, the beach is available for beach volleyball. The lake is fit for swimming most of the summer, except for days after rainstorms when bacteria counts are high.

On Canada Day, the pavilion and park is often the site of picnics or music festivals. In 2011, a small music festival, the "Canada Day Picnic" played live and recorded "house" music from 1 PM until 11 PM on July 1. In other years, the music has been country and other forms.

In September, the upper terrace is used for the annual Sunnyside Beach Juried Art Show & Sale. The show takes place over a weekend and includes live music. Admission is free.

== See also ==
- Sunnyside Amusement Park
- Sunnyside, Toronto
