= Roncesvalles, Toronto =

Roncesvalles Roncesvalles Village
- Neighbourhood
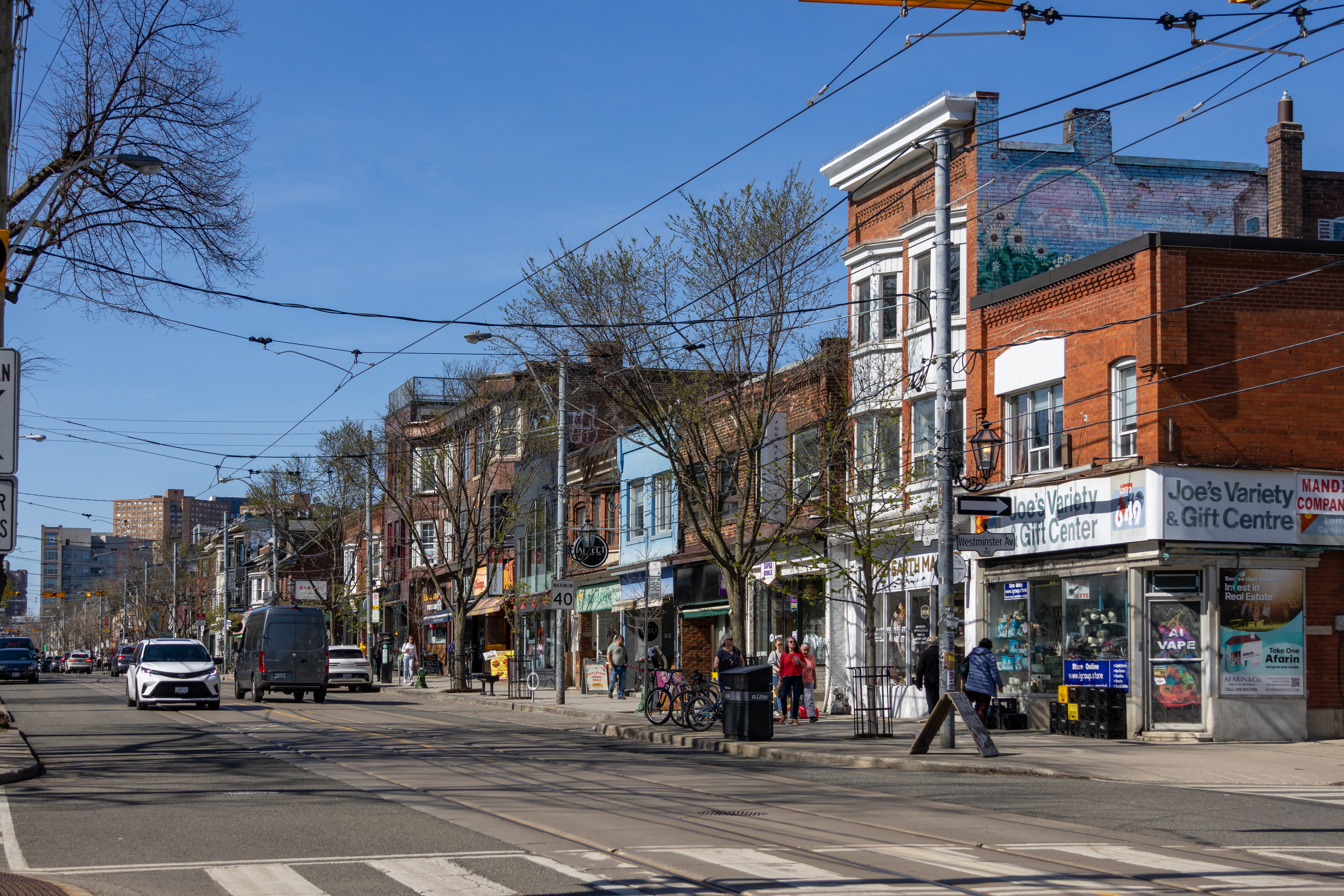
- Roncesvalles Avenue

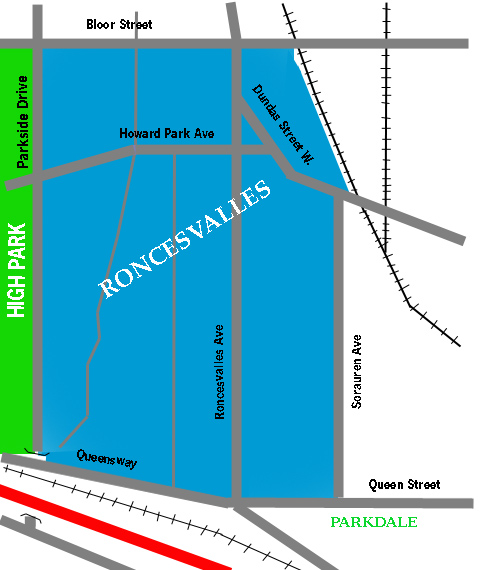

- Location within Toronto
- Coordinates: 43.646231°N 79.449048°W
- Country: Canada
- Province: Ontario
- City: Toronto
- Established: 1890 Subdivided

Government
  - Councillor: Gord Perks (NDP)
  - M.P.: Karim Bardeesy (Liberal)
  - M.P.P.: Alexa Gilmour (NDP)

Area
  - Total: 1.993 km^{2} (0.770 sq mi)

Population (2016)
  - Total: 16,696
  - Density: 8,377/km^{2} (21,700/sq mi)

Roncesvalles (/ˈrɒnsəsveɪlz/ RON-sə-svaylz), also known as Roncesvalles Village or Roncy Village, is a neighbourhood in the city of Toronto, Ontario, Canada, centred on Roncesvalles Avenue, a north–south street leading from the intersection of King and Queen Streets to the south, north to Dundas Street West, a distance of roughly 1.7 kilometres. It is located east of High Park, north of Lake Ontario, in the Taiaiako’n—Parkdale—High Park federal riding, the Parkdale–High Park provincial riding and the municipal Ward 4. Its informal boundaries are High Park to the west, Bloor Street West to the north, Lake Ontario/Queen Street West to the south and Lansdowne Avenue/rail corridor to the east. Originally known as "Howard Park", most of this area was formerly within the boundaries of Parkdale and Brockton villages and was annexed into Toronto in the 1880s.

Culturally, the area is known as the centre of the Polish-Canadian community in Toronto with prominent Polish institutions, businesses and St Casimir's Catholic Church located on Roncesvalles Avenue. The businesses along Roncesvalles have formed the Roncesvalles Village Business Improvement Area and hold the largest Polish Festival in North America, which takes place every September.

== Character ==
The neighbourhood is predominantly residential, with a commercial strip the full length of Roncesvalles, composed predominantly of small businesses, churches and institutions. To the west of Roncesvalles, the area is nearly completely residential except for St. Joseph's Health Centre and a Toronto Transit Commission (TTC) streetcar barn. East of Roncesvalles along the CN and CP rail lines is an older industrial area that is in transition. Several of the buildings along Sorauren Avenue have been converted into loft-style condominiums. At one time a large TTC bus garage was located along Sorauren Avenue; this property has been converted into Sorauren Park. Two other old industrial buildings along Wabash are owned by the City of Toronto, and are slated for a future community centre project. One of the buildings currently serves as a clubhouse for the Park.

The City of Toronto defines three official neighbourhoods as having boundaries with Roncesvalles Avenue. To the west, the official neighbourhood is High Park-Swansea. To the east, the official neighbourhood is named "Roncesvalles" – often referred to as "Roncy". To the southeast of Roncesvalles Avenue is "South Parkdale".

== History ==
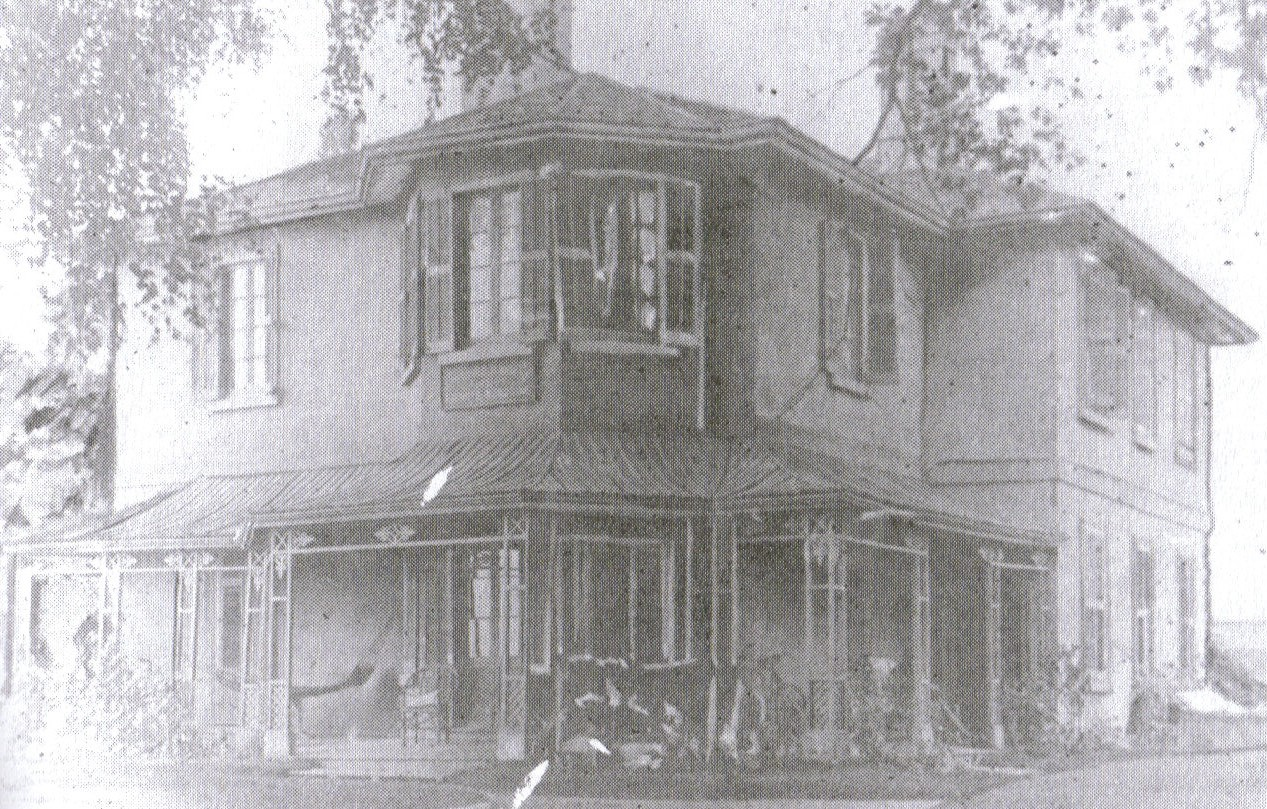
John Howard's Sunnyside home, c. 1880. The house was later demolished to make way for St. Joseph's Hospital.

Toronto's first highway to the west was Dundas Street starting at Queen Street along today's Ossington and west along its current path west to Dundas (near Hamilton). While Toronto's boundary was Dufferin Street, a very early village mostly built around hotels sprang up along Dundas just before it met Ossington and entered Toronto; this was Brockton. The Subdivision of land for Brockton included the portion of the neighbourhood east of what is now Roncesvalles Avenue. although little of this was built on. The rest of what is now the Roncesvalles neighbourhood began as farm lots given to Toronto's prominent Ridout family and the architect John George Howard. These men had careers in the city so little was done with their farmland most of which was never even cleared of the natural forest. Two houses were built by John Howard on these farms: Sunnyside (where St. Joseph's Hospital is now), and Colborne Lodge (Mr. Howard's own cottage built 1837) in what is now High Park. A path running through Sunnyside Farm was an Indigenous trail (now Indian Road) thought to have originally been an ancient Mississauga Indian path, leading from Lake Ontario north. In the 1850s, concurrent with the building of the railway, the central part of Brockton was separated from the Roncesvalles subdivided lands except for a small strip along Dundas between the railway and Bloor.

In 1850, Colonel O'Hara acquired the land north of Queen from Roncesvalles Avenue to just east of Lansdowne Avenue. In 1874, Colonel O'Hara died and his land was subdivided. Following the subdivision of two other farms south of Queen, a new village rapidly took shape and in 1879 was incorporated, despite protests by the City of Toronto, as the Village of Parkdale. The subdivision of O'Hara's land and the streets laid out after his death had names related to his family, largely superseded the Brockton subdivision south of the railway between Roncesvalles and Sorauren. Development in Parkdale crept up Sorauren Ave and there was even some building on Roncesvalles Avenue before a series of annexations brought Parkdale (1889), Brockton (1884) and the surrounding farmland (including Sunnyside farm) into the City of Toronto. In all there were 13 separate annexations by the City of Toronto between 1883 and 1893.

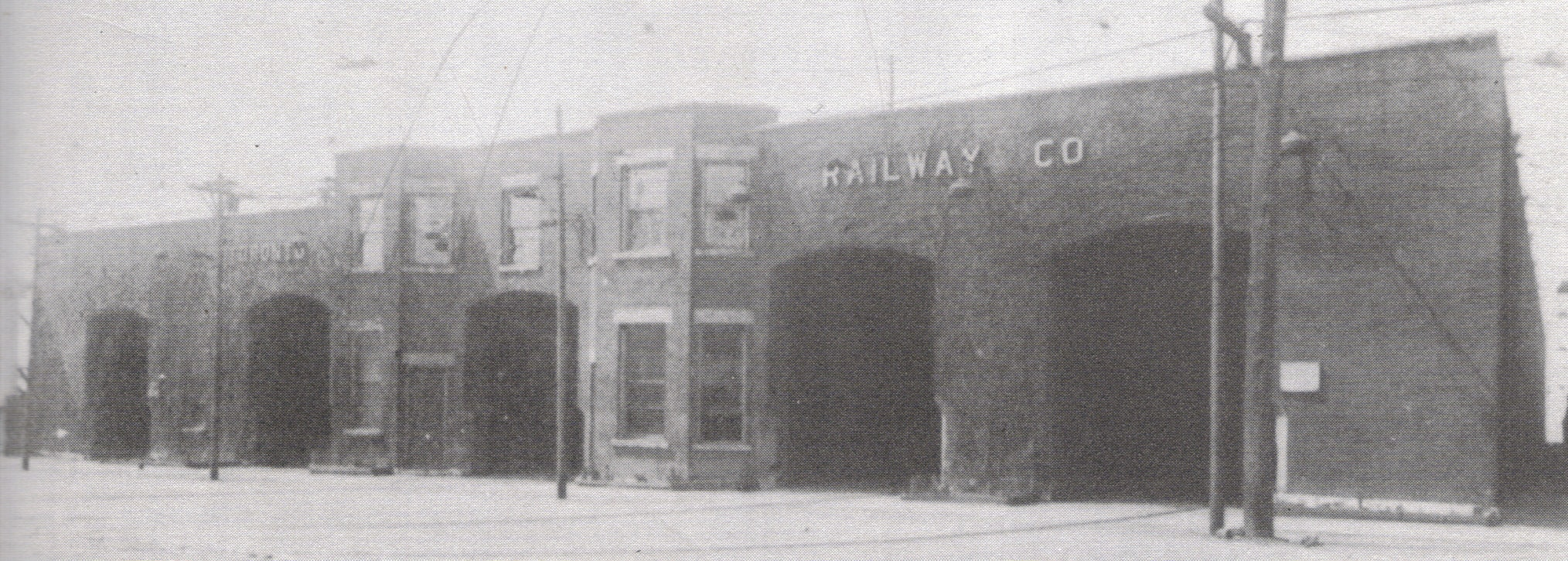
Roncesvalles Carhouse was built at the intersection of Roncesvalles Avenue and Queen Street West in 1895.

When Parkdale was annexed to Toronto, streets were laid out or extended to Keele Street (the section south of Bloor was later renamed Parkside Drive) and the street grid took the shape it has to this day. In the 1890s, the intersection of Roncesvalles and Queen became more important as a Lake Shore streetcar line was built, enabling commuting to the west. A streetcar yard was added at the intersection in 1895. The Sunnyside railway station at the intersection was opened in 1912.

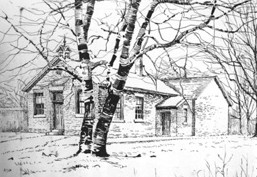
A depiction of Howard Park School, c. 1909. Howard Park School was the first school built in the neighbourhood.

At the turn of the 20th century, the first school was built in the neighbourhood, the Old Howard Park school on Boustead Avenue. Although a number of Victorian homes had already been built extending north from Parkdale, the neighbourhood was largely built from 1900 until the First World War with almost all houses built in the 'foursquare' style. Originally these homes were designed for the middle class while wealthier homes were found in Parkdale. Also at this time, the first four Carnegie Libraries were opened in Toronto. Apart from the Central Library all (three) libraries were identical, one of them being the High Park branch on Roncesvalles Avenue. The three original churches were also built at this time; St Vincent de Paul (Roman Catholic), St Jude's (Anglican) and Howard Park Emmanuel (United Church). In the later years of its development, Roncesvalles began to attract some wealthier families and many impressive homes were built from 1910 to 1930 on High Park Gardens and High Park Boulevard.

The lakefront was developed by the Toronto Harbour Commission in the 1910s, leading to the development of the Sunnyside Beach and Amusement Park in 1922. Its popularity spurred development of the area commercially. The foot of Roncesvalles became a commercial and transportation hub, with a train station, a bus depot and the streetcar loop. The Park was demolished for the Gardiner Expressway project in 1955 and the Sunnyside intersection bypassed, leading to a decline in commerce and residential values in the area. The wealthy moved away from the area to newer suburbs further west and many large local homes were divided into apartments. However, Roncesvalles has remained largely middle class, attracting an influx of successful immigrants especially from Poland reversing the relationship between Roncesvalles and Parkdale. St Casimir's Catholic Parish was established in 1944. The construction of the church and church hall began in 1948 and was completed in 1954 by which time the Polish community had become well established in the area. It was the construction of the church that attracted the Polish immigrants to the immediate area.

=== Street names ===
These names are attributed to Walter O'Hara:

- Roncesvalles Avenue,- O'Hara named it after the Battle of Roncesvalles which took place in the Roncesvalles gorge in Spain in 1813 in which he led a regiment that fought against the retreating army of Napoleon.
- Alhambra Avenue, after the palace in Spain,
- Constance Street, after his daughter,
- Fermanagh Avenue, after the county of his birth in Ireland, Fermanagh Place was a farm property through which the street was laid.
- Geoffrey Street, after a son,
- Marion Street, after his wife, and
- Sorauren Avenue, is named after the Battle of Sorauren at which Col. O'Hara was present.
- Wright Avenue, after James Wright, whose farm was sub-divided to build the street, and Fern Avenue and Garden Avenue, between Roncesvalles and part-way to Sorauren.

Fern Avenue used to be named Ruth Avenue, after his daughter and Grenadier Road used to be named Walter Avenue, after another son. The streets O'Hara Avenue and West Lodge Avenue both to the east were laid out and named after O'Hara's death.

Other street names have historical connections:

- Sunnyside Ave, Parkside Dr, Colborne Lodge Drive (in High Park), Howard Park Avenue, High Park Gardens, High Park Boulevard, High Park Ave (in the High Park neighbourhood) – all relate to John Howard.
- Grenadier Road – (Grenadiers from Fort York were the first regular users of High Park).
- Indian Road, Indian Grove, Indian Road Crescent, Indian Valley Crescent, Indian Trail and Algonquin Ave – all named after the old native path.
- Ridout Street – the Ridout family, which owned property in the north-west vicinity of High Park.

== Culture ==
Historical population
Year	Pop.	±%
2006	15,996	—
2011	16,366	+2.3%
2016	16,696	+2.0%

The area has a highly developed history of political and community participation. There are several established community associations active. The High Park Residents' Association represents the area south of Bloor Street between Parkside Drive and Roncesvalles Avenue south to High Park Boulevard. The Sunnyside Community Association represents the area directly south of High Park Boulevard between Parkside and Roncesvalles, south to Lake Ontario. The Roncesvalles-MacDonnell Residents' Association represents the area east of Roncesvalles from Bloor south to Queen Street, east of Roncesvalles, south of the railway lines, west of Lansdowne Avenue.

In 2012, Roncesvalles was named as one of eight finalists in the "Canadian Institute of Planners’ (CIP) Great Places in Canada" contest, and the only neighbourhood from Toronto. From a poll of 200,000 votes nationwide, 90 neighbourhoods were nominated. A panel of planners reduced the list to 21 and Roncesvalles survived a second cut to make it to the top eight. According to CIP President Andrea Gabor: "in Roncesvalles, people can bike in or get on a streetcar, so they still feel like part of the city and connected to the downtown ... I think it embodies a lot of what people want when they’re living in the city."

=== Arts ===
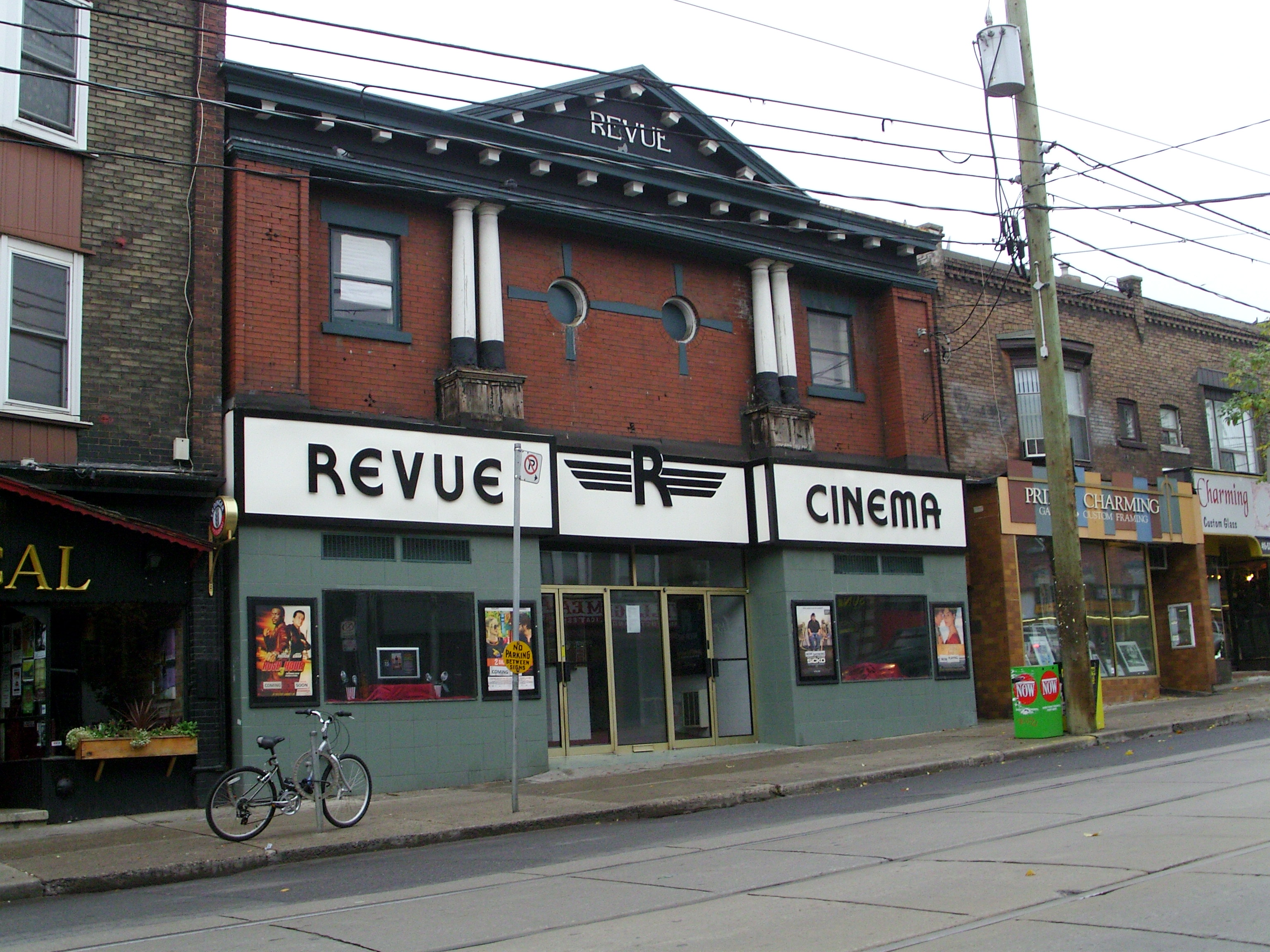
The Revue Cinema is a popular repertory cinema in Roncesvalles.

The popular repertory movie theatre Revue Cinema, at the intersection of Roncesvalles and Howard Park Avenue first opened its doors in 1911. It closed for a year as part of the dissolution of the Festival Cinemas chain. It reopened as a non-profit operation of the Revue Film Society. The Society laboured for a year to find a way to reopen the Revue, and partnered with a local couple who purchased the theatre and now leases it to the Society.

Another theatre, the Brighton, closed in the mid-1980s. It is in use as a convenience store, although it has not been renovated, other than its marquee signage removed.

The area has several bars and restaurants with live music. The Local pub offers live music daily. Inter Steer offers live music twice a week. Loons Restaurant & Pub offers live music on Friday nights. Latinada, on Bloor Street west of Dundas, is a Tapas bar with live music.

The "Roncy Rocks" festival, a one-day music and art show, has been held outdoors along Roncesvalles. Several side streets off Roncesvalles were closed and musical stages and art displays installed. Musicians and artists were mostly local to the community.

In 2018, the Museum of Contemporary Art Toronto Canada moved to a location in the former Tower Building nearby on Sterling Road. There are several independent art galleries on Dundas Street West between Sorauren Avenue and Roncesvalles.

=== Polish community ===
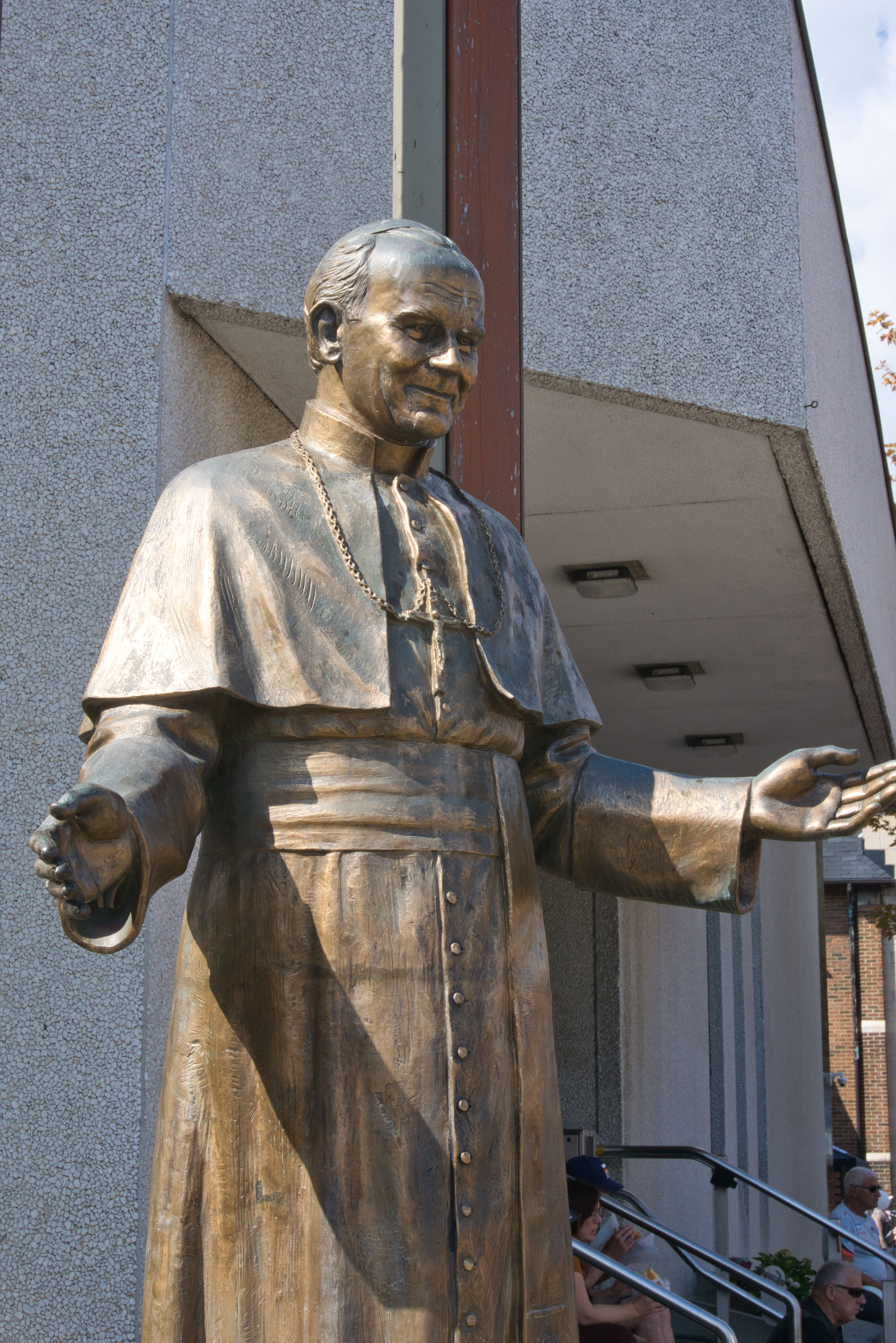
A statue of Pope John Paul II stands in Roncesvalles.

The street has long been known as the cultural and commercial centre of Toronto's Polish Canadian community. A number of Polish-speaking restaurants, delicatessens and shops specializing in Polish goods are located on Roncesvalles Avenue. The sign "Mówimy po polsku" ("We speak Polish") is displayed in some storefronts.

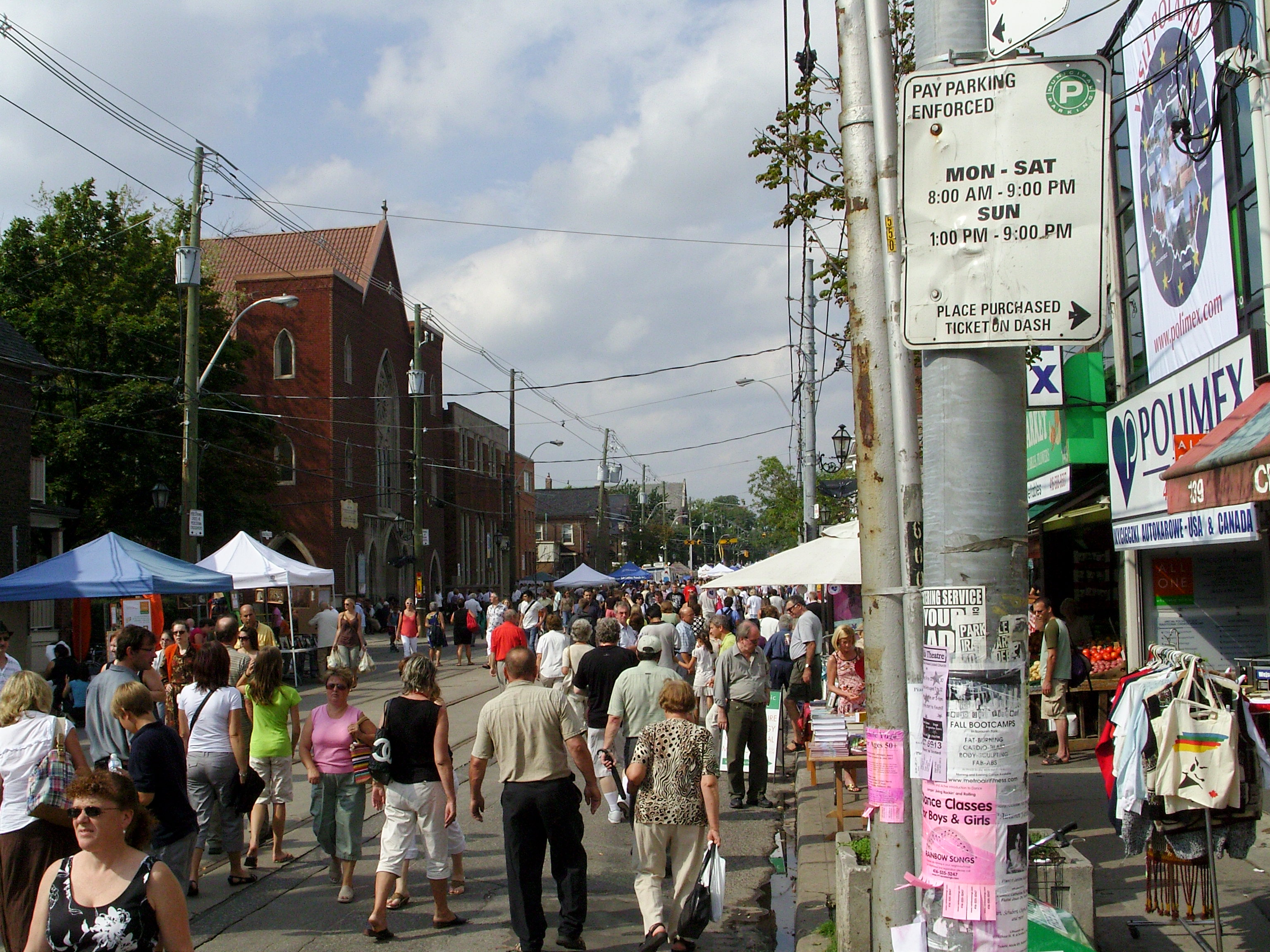
The Roncesvalles Village Polish Festival is an annual festival held in the neighbourhood.

While still recognized as a centre of the Polish community, the ethnic makeup of the area around Roncesvalles Avenue varies widely, as is the case throughout Toronto. According to the 2006 census figures, in Ward 14, which includes Roncesvalles, there were 2,775 residents who identified Polish as their mother tongue, or 5.5% of the population. This is the second-largest group after English. According to the 2011 census, the overall number of residents of Toronto who identify Polish as their mother tongue is 27,880.

The Roncesvalles Village Business Improvement Area holds an annual Roncesvalles Village Polish Festival each fall, closing Roncesvalles Avenue to vehicular traffic. The festival features amusement rides, clothing, craft and food stands and outdoor musical entertainment, including polka music. In 2011, an estimated 300,000 people attended the festival. The official patron of the festival is the Polish Consulate. It is considered the largest Polish festival in North America.

The public library branch holds a collection of Polish-language books and magazines. Polish-language lessons are part of the curriculum at St. Vincent de Paul separate school.

At the southern end of Roncesvalles Avenue, at the Sunnyside intersection of King, Queen, Queensway and Roncesvalles streets, two monuments are erected in memory of two events in Polish history. A large monument in memory of the massacre of Polish prisoners of war during World War II, and especially the mass graves of officers found in Katyn forest. Fresh wreaths are placed there regularly. Next to it is a memorial to thousands of Polish citizens deported to Siberian labour camps during the Second World War.

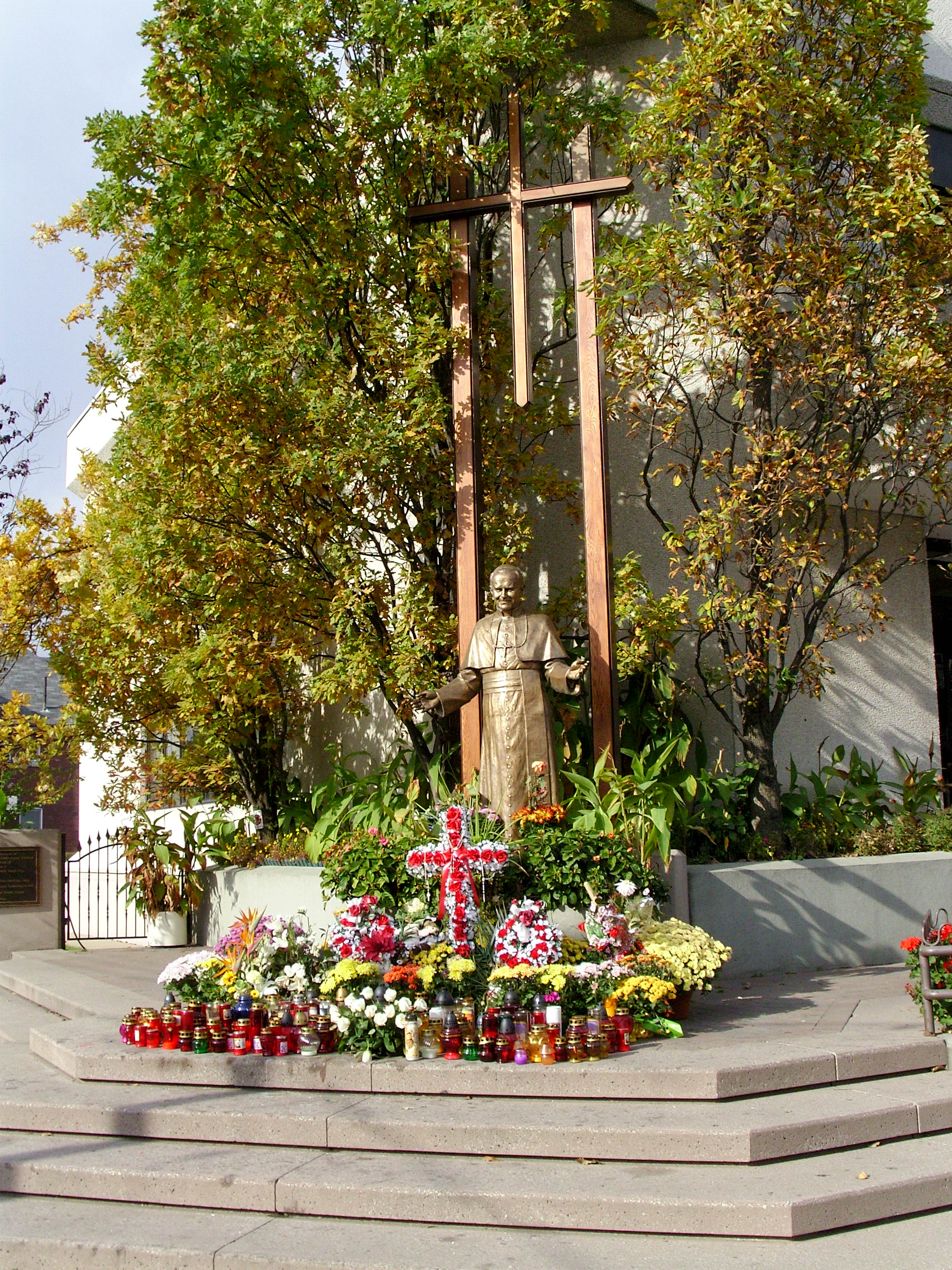
The full memorial of the Pope's visit

In Poland, the Catholic faith is predominant, and this is the case for persons of Polish descent ('Polonia') in Canada. There are two large Catholic churches on Roncesvalles. St. Casimir's Roman Catholic Church offers Polish-language masses every Sunday. St. Vincent de Paul Catholic Church, at Westminster Avenue, holds masses in English and Latin.

An enormous memorial was held on Roncesvalles Avenue when Pope John Paul II died, with standing room only on the street and sidewalks of Roncesvalles from Marion Avenue to Wright Avenue. The memorial was loosely centred on a statue of the Pope located at the St. Stanislaus-St. Casimir's Credit Union, a credit union for people of Polish descent. A tribute of candles and flowers around the statue continues today. When Pope John Paul II visited Toronto in 1984, he had visited Roncesvalles and dined at the Sir Nicholas Restaurant at 89 Roncesvalles.

== Institutions ==
=== Churches ===
The Annunciation Of The Virgin Mary Greek Orthodox Cathedral is located at Sorauren Avenue and Galley Avenue. Until 1961, it was the North Parkdale United Church, when it was purchased for $160,000. It was elevated to Cathedral status in 1967. Its interior was damaged by fire in 2000 but was refurbished.

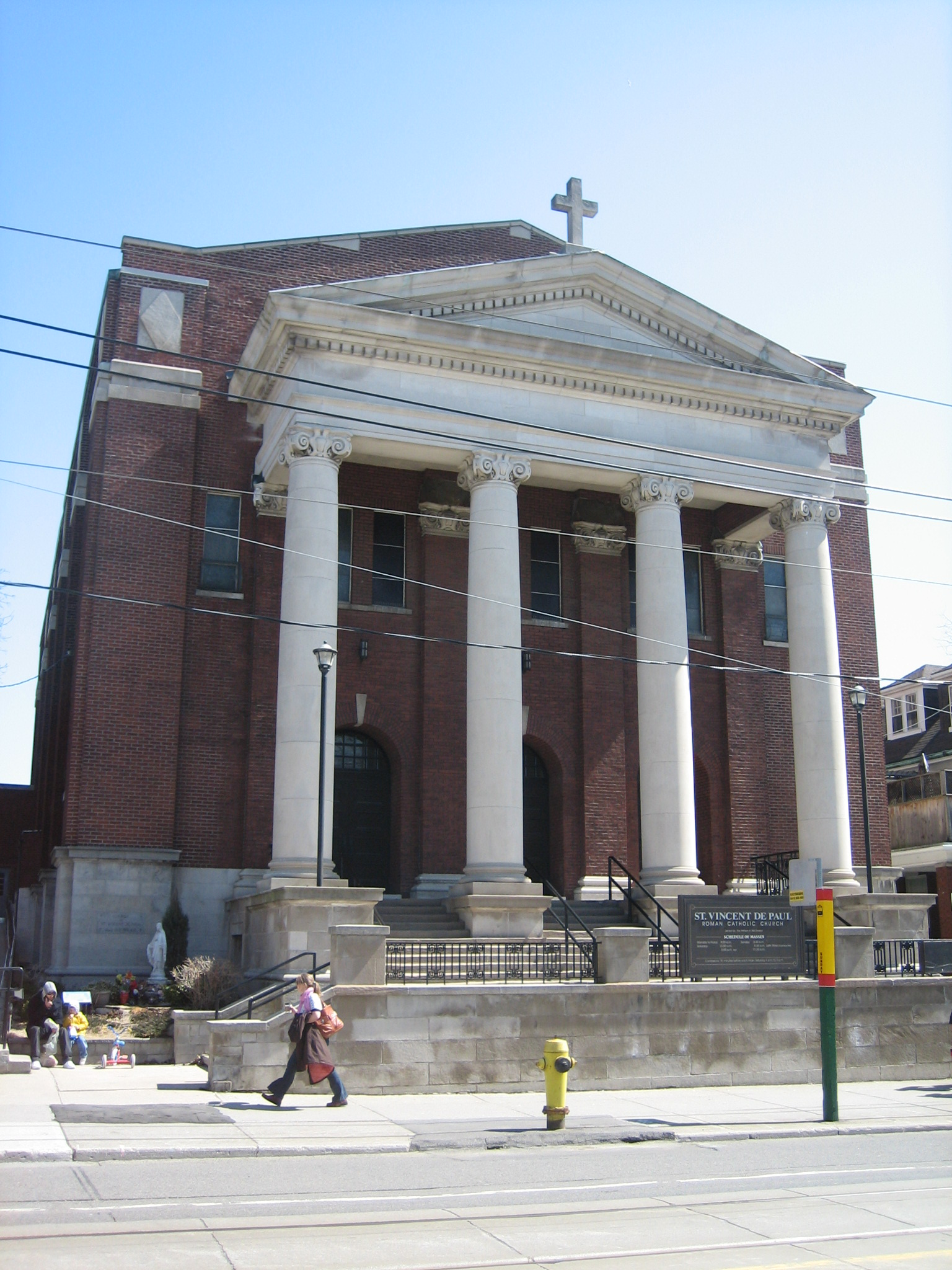
St. Vincent de Paul Roman Catholic Church is one of several places of worship in Roncesvalles.

Roncesvalles United Church, located at Wright Avenue, operates a church and a community hub with spaces available for rent. The church was renamed Emmanuel – Howard Park in 1972, following the merger of its congregation with that of Howard Park United Church. Cheri DiNovo was the pastor of the church until she was elected as the current Member of Provincial Parliament (MPP) for Parkdale–High Park in 2006. The former Howard Park Church is located at Sunnyside and Marmaduke and was converted into housing. As of 2016, Emmanuel – Howard Park was renamed Roncesvalles United Church. Services are held on Sunday mornings and on special Christian Holy Days at the church.

St. Casimir's Polish Roman Catholic Church at Garden Avenue, offers Polish masses on Sundays. Its origins begin in 1944 when the Oblate Mission decided to create the third Polish parish (and first in the west end) in Toronto. The lot on which the church stands today was purchased for $15,000 in 1948 and construction on the parish hall began the same year. The first mass was held in the church hall in 1949. The church was completed and officially began offering mass on May 23, 1954. The founder and driving force behind the creation of the parish and church was Father Michael Smith who later went on to found Copernicus Lodge. The parish and church were important in the beginning of the Polish community in Toronto's west end. The 'mother' parish of St. Casimir's is Saint Stanislaus Kostka Church located at 12 Denison Avenue.

St. Vincent de Paul Roman Catholic Church, at Westminster Avenue, offers Latin masses on Sundays, was built in the 1910s.

Westminster Chapel at High Park is a merger of Westminster Chapel and High Park Baptist Church. Westminster Chapel at High Park is located on Hewitt Avenue. High Park Baptist Church was founded as the Hewitt Avenue Mission in 1908 and was originally an outpost of Walmer Road Baptist Church. At the time, Roncesvalles was largely unpopulated, with the Eaton family home on Indian Road being one of the only residences in the area. The original building has been expanded several times, culminating in the construction of a unique circular sanctuary in 1927. High Park Baptist holds Sunday services, small group Bible studies in the church and local homes, and hosts "Room To Roam" a drop-in for parents and children in the neighbourhood, a popular food and clothing bank, summer day camps for local children, and more.

=== Health ===
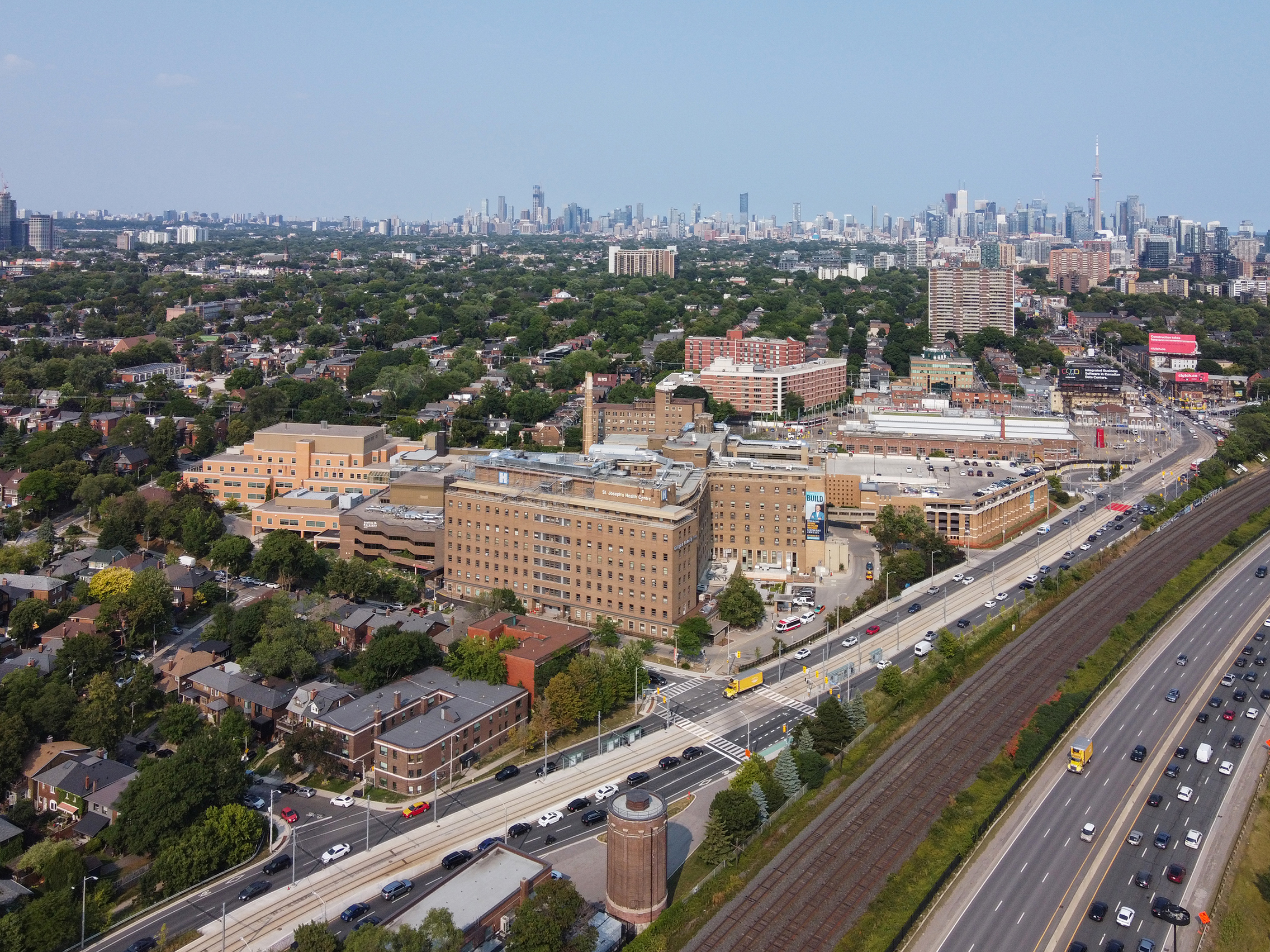
St. Joseph's Health Centre is a teaching hospital located in the southern portion of Roncesvalles.

The large St. Joseph's Health Centre at Sunnyside Avenue and The Queensway in the south of the district has been on the site since the 1840s, being first the site of the Sisters of St. Joseph Order, then an orphanage and later the hospital. Unity Health, which also operates St. Michael's Hospital, operates the hospital. It occupies the site of Sunnyside Lodge, a home of John Howard.

At the south end of Roncesvalles is Copernicus Lodge, a large chronic care and nursing home facility that primarily serves the Polish community although not exclusively. The Lodge is a monument to the community that in large part was responsible for its creation. It opened its first wing on Roncesvalles and later opened a new wing on Marion Street.

There are several doctor's offices on Roncesvalles, and several are located in the Sunnyside Medical Arts Building at 27 Roncesvalles, including the St. Joseph's Urban Family Health Team. The street has several drugstores.

=== Education ===
The Toronto District School Board (TDSB) is an English secular public school board that serves the City of Toronto. The school board operates a number of institutions that provides primary and secondary. TDSB does not operate any secondary schools in the neighbourhood, although three TDSB secondary school located near the neighbourhood serve the students of Roncesvalles. They include Humberside Collegiate Institute, Parkdale Collegiate Institute, and Western Technical-Commercial School. Primary schools operated by TDSB in Roncesvalles include:

- Fern Avenue Public School is a public elementary school and middle school on Fern Avenue, east of Roncesvalles.
- Garden Avenue Junior Public School is a public elementary school on Garden Avenue west of Roncesvalles. It was founded in 1957 and was known as Argentina Junior P.S. between 1961 and 1982, but this was changed back to the original name during the Falklands conflict.
- Howard Junior Public School is a public elementary school on Marmaduke Street at Sunnyside Avenue.

The Toronto District Catholic School Board (TDCSB) is a public English separate school board that serves the City of Toronto. The school board operates institutions that provides primary and secondary education. Schools operated by TDCSB in Roncesvalles include:

- St. Vincent de Paul Catholic Elementary School is a Catholic elementary school on Fermanagh Avenue east of Roncesvalles. It was founded in 1914 operating out of a storefront on Roncesvalles Avenue, across the street from the church. With the end of the war in 1918, a separate building was constructed for the school behind the church on Westminster Ave., which was run by Sisters of Loreto. The school was extended to Fermanagh Avenue shortly after. Problems with low enrolment threatened the existence of the school which was considered for closure during a reorganization of the Metropolitan Separate School Board (which became the TCDSB) and general changes of demographics.
- Bishop Marrocco/Thomas Merton Catholic Secondary School. The school is leased by the TCDSB.

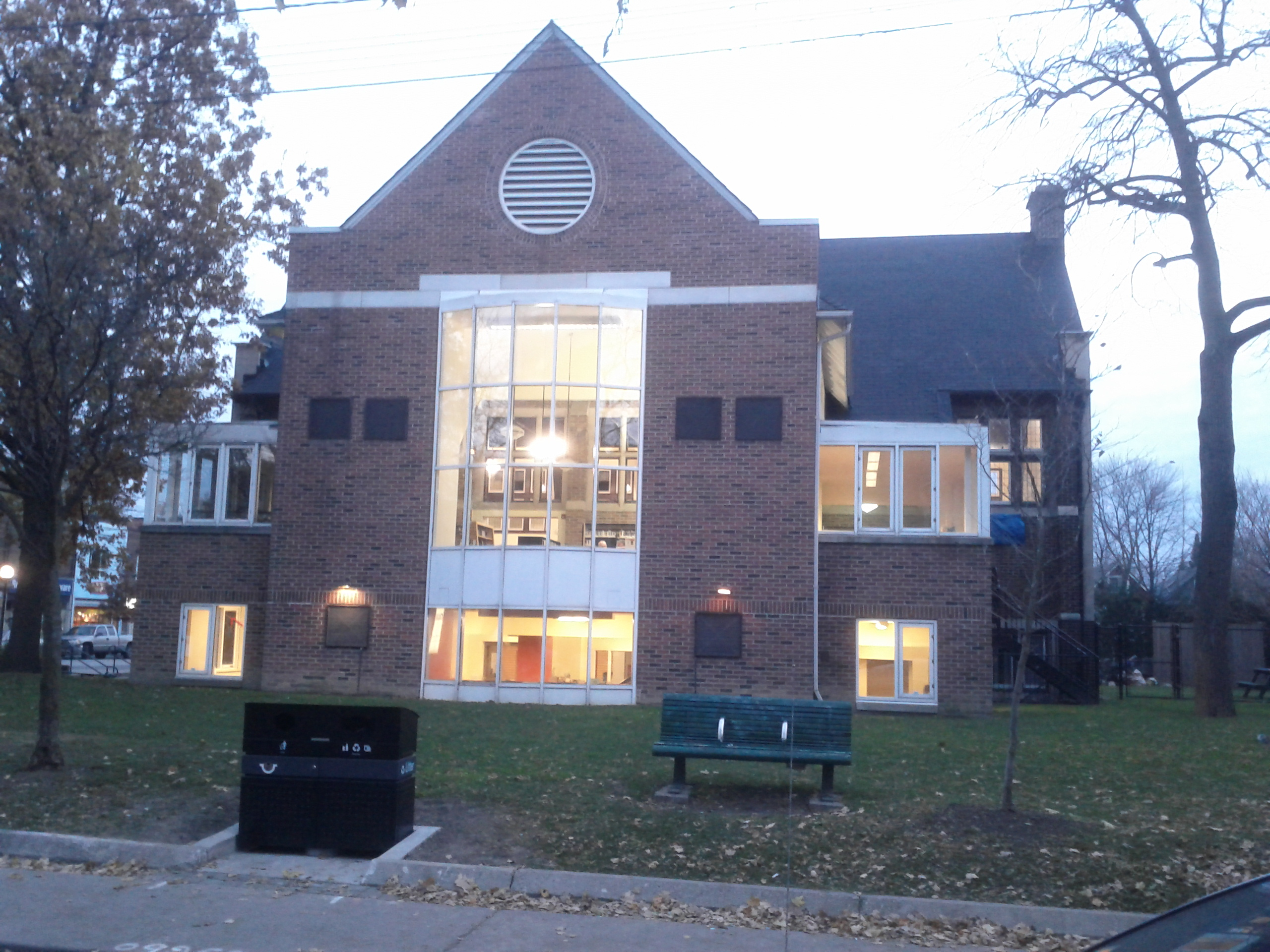
The High Park branch of the Toronto Public Library is located in Roncesvalles.

Two public French-language secondary schools, École secondaire catholique Saint-Frère-André and École secondaire Toronto Ouest operate nearby on Lansdowne Avenue in the former West Toronto Collegiate building. They are operated by Conseil scolaire catholique MonAvenir, and Conseil scolaire Viamonde respectively.

The High Park branch of the Toronto Public Library, a Carnegie library, is located at Wright Avenue. It was opened in 1916, and renovated in 1979 and again in 1991.

== Economy ==
There are myriad small businesses, most of which are independently owned and operated. These include specialty gift shops, pharmacies, grocers (including organic specialty), health food stores, clothing and shoe boutiques, cafes and restaurants, book and music stores, video stores, art shops, hardware stores and law offices. The former S.S. Kresge store, now a Royal Bank, was built in 1936 and retains its original Kresge signage. The majority of shops are accommodated in two or three-storey structures built in the first half of the 20th century, with the retail portion on the ground floor and apartments above.

Roncesvalles is very well known for the large number of small restaurants, cafés and specialty food shops of various cuisines. There are several bakeries and delicatessens found along the full length of Roncesvalles.

The Roncesvalles Village Business Improvement Area district includes businesses along the full length of Roncesvalles from Dundas Street to Queen Street. The BIA was founded in 1985.

== Recreation ==
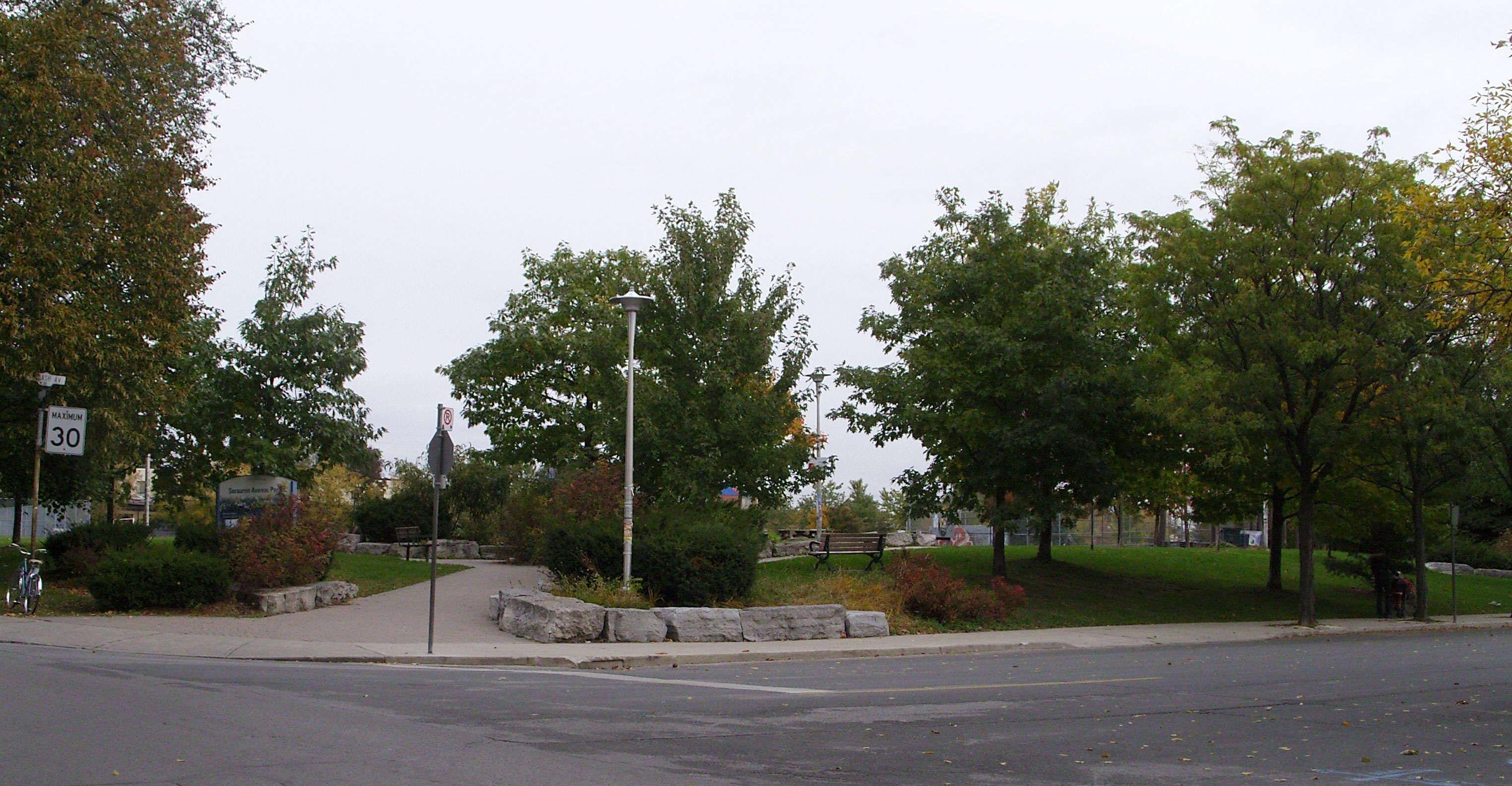
Sorauren Avenue Park is one of several parks and sporting facilities in the neighbourhood.

The Roncesvalles area has several parks and sporting facilities. The schools of the neighbourhood also provide facilities, including swimming pools for school-age children. The largest park in the area is 400 acres (160 ha) High Park west of Parkside Drive, with playgrounds, Grenadier Pond, a zoo, baseball diamonds, outdoor swimming pool and forest. Sorauren Avenue Park, was created at the intersection of Sorauren Avenue and Wabash Avenue on the site of a former bus garage. It now holds two tennis courts, two soccer fields and a fieldhouse. A playground is across Wabash from the park. At the site, a former linseed oil factory is now in the ownership of the City and is earmarked for a future recreation centre. To the south of the area, the Sunnyside lakefront provides playgrounds, picnic areas, the Sunnyside Bathing Pavilion, a boardwalk, a recreation trail and beaches.

High Park provides baseball diamonds and organized youth baseball programs. High Park also has two soccer fields, tennis courts and an artificial ice rink in the winter. The École secondaire catholique Saint-Frère-André and École secondaire Toronto Ouest on Lansdowne Avenue to the east provide an all-weather track and a soccer field. The closest hockey arena is at McCormick, east of Lansdowne.

There are several club-run facilities. High Park Curling Club on Indian Road is Toronto's oldest curling club. The current rink was opened in 1911. There are two tennis clubs in High Park. Along the lakefront, there are rowing clubs including the Argonaut Club. The Boulevard Club operates tennis and boating facilities.

== Transportation ==
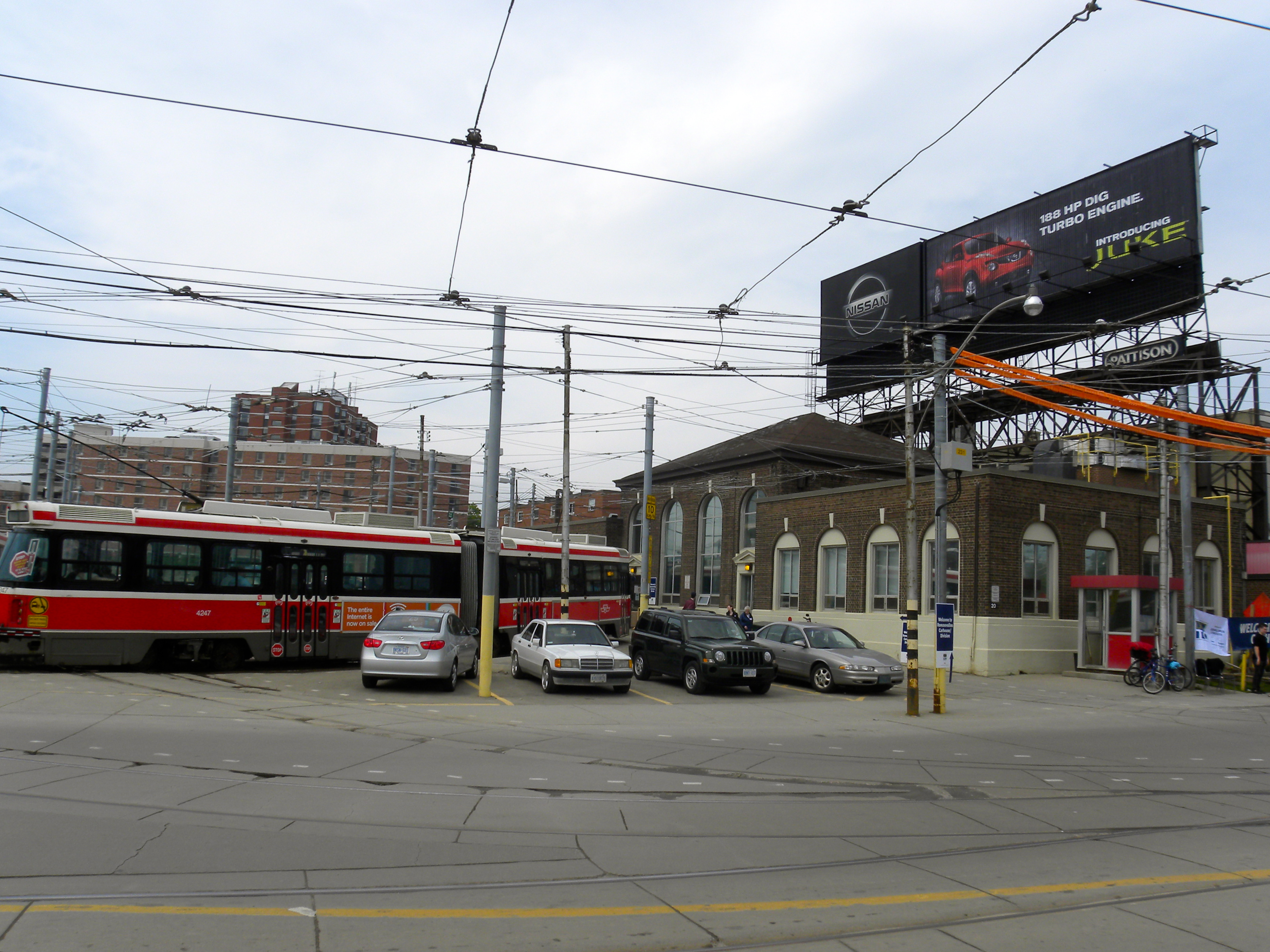
Roncesvalles is home to a storage and maintenance facility for the Toronto streetcar system.

The intersection of Roncesvalles, Queen and King streets has long been a transportation hub of the city of Toronto. Passenger trains first served the area in 1855. In the 1890s the location became the hub of commuter streetcars going as far west as Port Credit. In 1895, Toronto Railway Company (forerunner of the TTC) built the Roncesvalles streetcar yards, which continue to dominate the northwest corner. The intersection itself is famous for its huge number of streetcar tracks, possibly the most numerous in the city. The area has also been home to two other TTC yards, one streetcar yard in the triangle formed by Howard Park Avenue, Dundas Street West and Ritchie Avenue, and the bus garage on Sorauren Ave on the current site of Sorauren Park. The Roncesvalles Carhouse, a streetcar maintenance and storage facility, is located within Roncesvalles.

Today, the area is well served by the Dundas West and Keele subway stations to the north at Bloor Street. The 501, 504A, 505, and 506 streetcars provide frequent service and the 80 Queensway bus provides service along Parkside Avenue from Keele station.

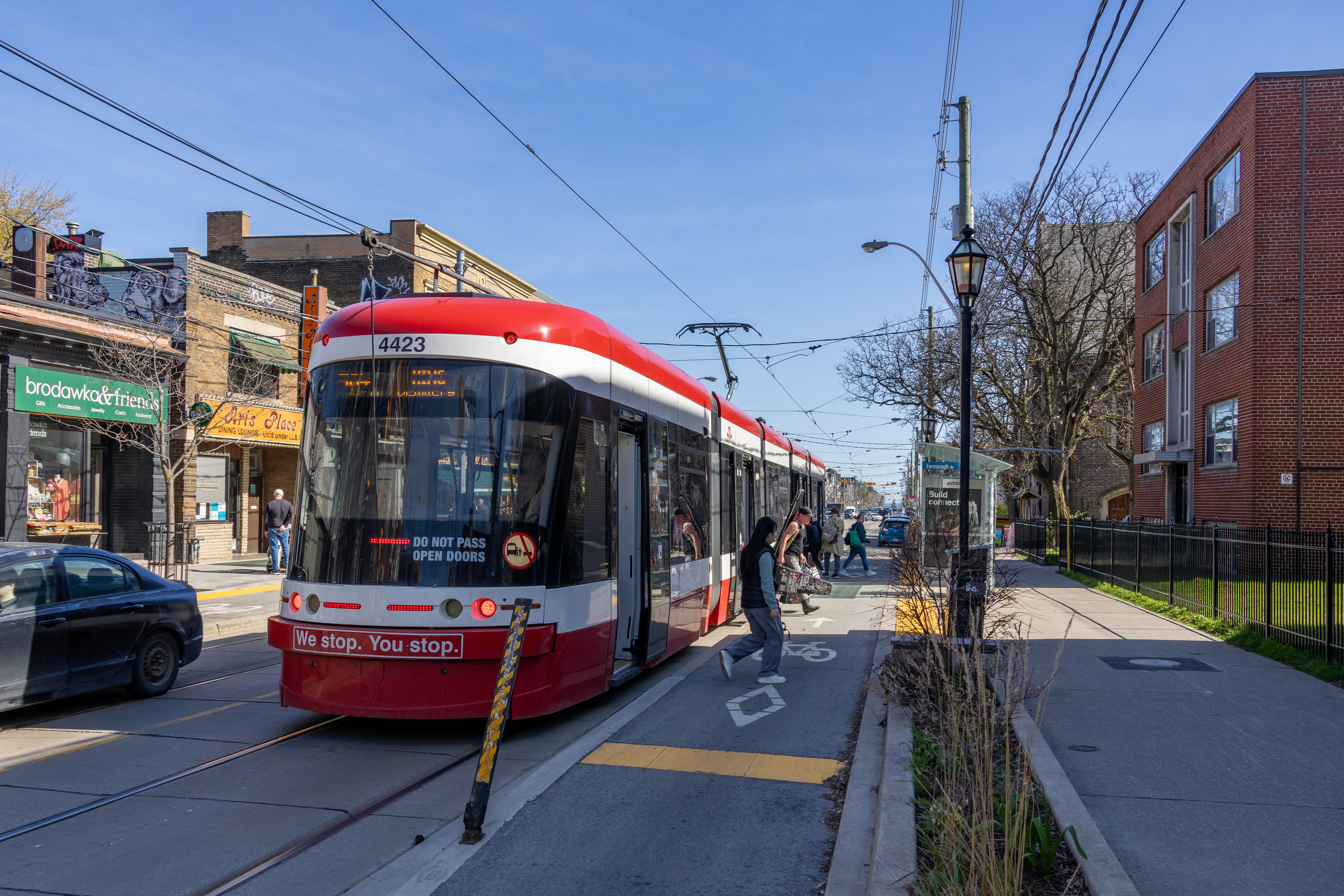
A 504 King streetcar stopping at Fermanagh Avenue. In 2009–10, transit platforms were built, incorporating ramped entrances to streetcars, and bicycle lanes.

Roncesvalles Avenue was completely reconstructed in 2009–2011, partially owing to the need to replace the sewer pipes, water mains and the streetcar tracks. The roadway re-construction incorporated roadway narrowing and sidewalk improvements. Transit platforms were built to extend to the streetcar doors at transit stops. The transit platforms incorporated ramps to provide a bicycle lane. Sewers were rebuilt during 2009 and early 2010. The trees on the street, which were in planters, were replaced, and the new trees planted at ground level. The soil beneath the tree plantings was landscaped into trenches beneath the sidewalks.

GO Transit operates trains along the Lakeshore rail line, although no longer stopping at Sunnyside. The nearest stop is at Exhibition Place. There are GO trains operating along the CN/CP lines to the east, stopping at Bloor Street and Dundas Street West.

There once was an inter-city bus depot at the northwest corner of Roncesvalles and Queen, now converted to a fast-food restaurant. This took over from the commuter streetcars, although streetcars do travel as far west as Long Branch from Roncesvalles.

The former Toronto - Sunnyside passenger train station, providing intercity train connections, on the Great Western line opened in 1910 at the foot of Roncesvalles. It replaced the railway station located at Jameson and Springhurst, that opened in 1879. Sunnyside station shut in 1971 and was demolished in 1973.

== Notable events ==
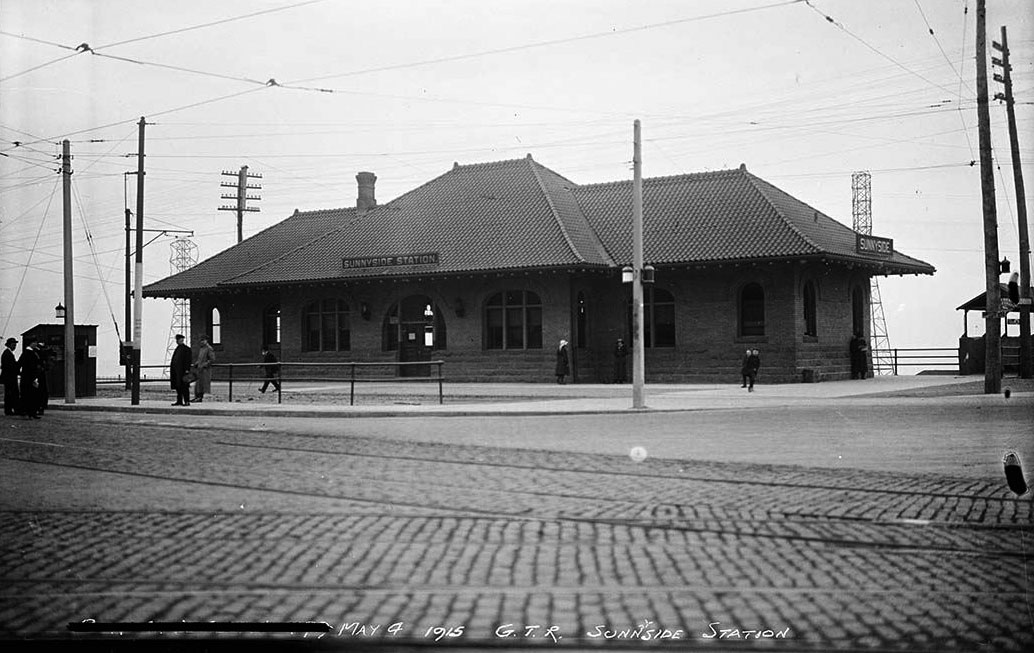
Sunnyside station opens in 1910, located at the southern end of Roncesvalles Avenue.

- 1850 – Col. O'Hara acquires 420 acres (170 ha) east of Roncesvalles, north of Queen Street, as part of compensation for helping to put down the 1837 Rebellion.
- 1855 – Great Western Railway rail line along Lake Ontario to Hamilton is built. Station at foot of Jameson and Springhurst built in 1879.
- 1856 – Grand Trunk Railway, running north-south to the east of Roncesvalles is built. Stations at Dufferin and Queen and at Dundas and Dupont.
- 1873 – Most of High Park given to city by John Howard.
- 1876 – Sunnyside Residence, orphanage on grounds of then Sunnyside Lodge, and now the site of current St. Joseph's opens, operated by Sisters of St. Joseph.
- 1884 – Annexation of Brockton Village into Toronto.
- 1884 – Annexation of Sunnyside farm into Toronto.
- 1889 – Annexation of Parkdale by Toronto.
- 1893 - Production of Neilson Dairy ice cream begins from a market garden on Lynd Avenue.
- 1895 – Roncesvalles streetcar yard built.
- 1905 – Parkdale Canoe Club founded. Now known as Boulevard Club. First club building built in 1915 at foot of Roncesvalles.
- 1908 – Hewitt Avenue Mission, now High Park Baptist Church, built at Hewitt and Roncesvalles.
- 1910 – Sunnyside railway station opens to replace South Parkdale railway station, closed after grade separation project completion.
- 1910 – High Park Presbyterian Church at Wright and Roncesvalles built. (Now known as Roncesvalles United.)
- 1912 – Revue Cinema opens.
- 1914 – St. Vincent de Paul Catholic Church and School open on Roncesvalles.
- 1915 – High Park Library opens.
- 1921 – St. Joseph's Hospital established.

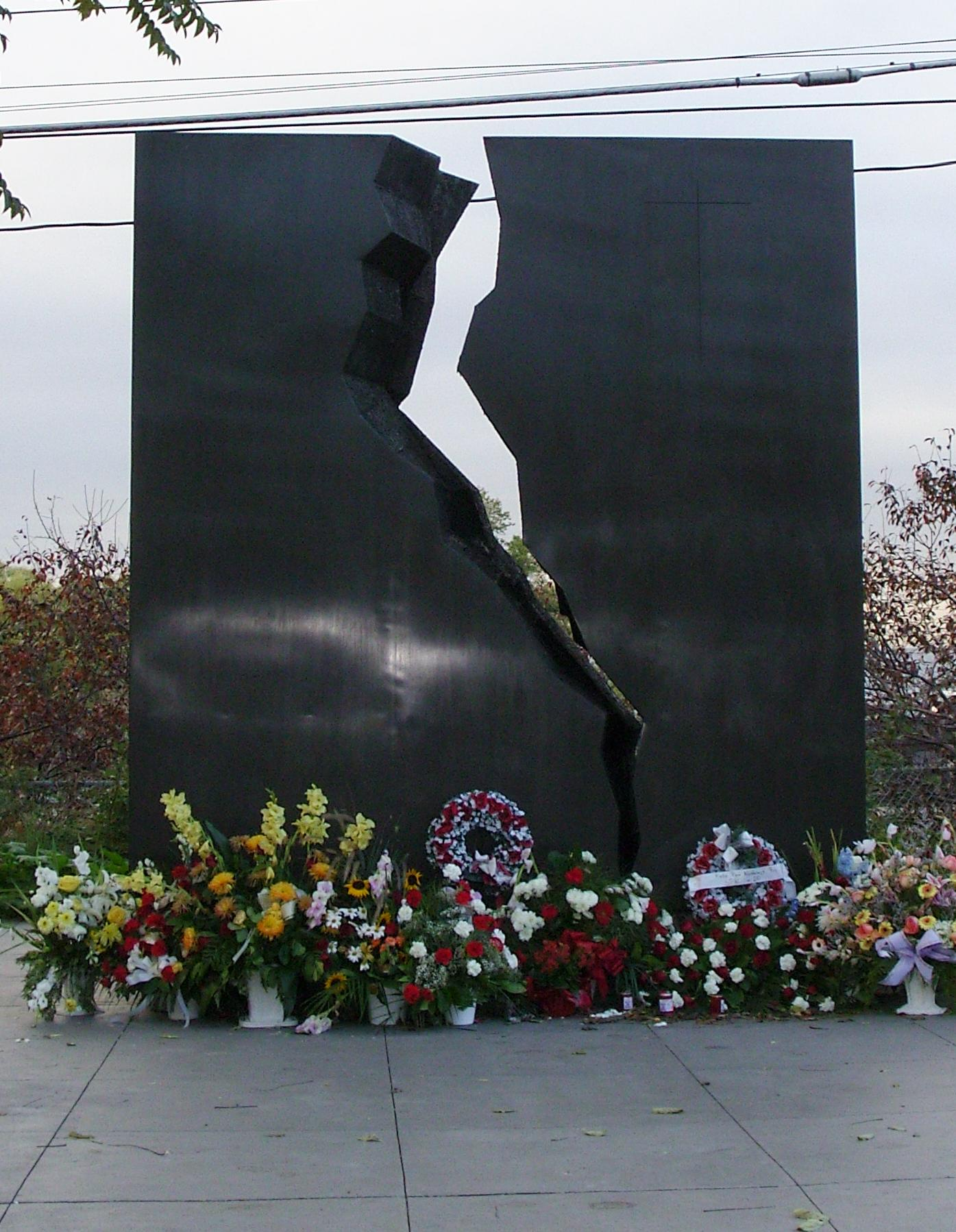
A memorial to the victims of the Katyn massacre was erected in Roncesvalles in 1980.

- 1922 – Sunnyside Amusement Park opens.
- 1922 – Palais Royale opens at foot of Roncesvalles.
- 1930 – City acquires the last part of High Park property, bringing the total to 400 acres (160 ha) in size.
- 1952 – St. Casimir's Church built. This coincides with the influx of Polish immigrants and the movement of Polish Torontonians from the Queen Street West area around St. Stanislaus Catholic Church.
- 1955 – Demolition of Sunnyside Amusement Park. The Lakeshore Road is closed from the foot of Roncesvalles, the street 'The Queensway' is built, and streetcars are rerouted from the Lakeshore Road to The Queensway in a dedicated right-of-way.
- 1958 – Gardiner Expressway opens.
- 1963 – The Sphynx cat is alleged to have originated from a litter born in a Roncesvalles Avenue alley.
- 1971 – Sunnyside railway station closes. Demolished in 1973.
- 1979 – Copernicus Lodge retirement home opens.
- 1980 – Erection of Katyn monument.
- 1984 – Pope John Paul II visit, with open-air mass at Exhibition Place.
- 2005 – Outdoor memorial mass for Pope John Paul II on Roncesvalles Avenue.
- 2005 – First annual Roncesvalles Village Polish festival.
- 2008 – First season of the Sorauren Farmers' Market in Sorauren Park on Monday afternoons.
- 2010, April 11 – Mass at St. Casimir's and march to Katyn monument to honour victims of the 2010 Polish Air Force Tu-154 crash, which killed the Polish president and government officials.

== Notable people ==
- Harold Ballard – The Ballard family (father Sidney owned a textile machinery business) lived at 44 Parkway Avenue in the early 1900s. Harold attended Howard Public School, graduating in 1916.
- The Boyd Gang – Edwin Alonzo Boyd's gang achieved national notoriety in the 1950s with a crime spree that began at the Roncesvalles branch of the Toronto Bank (across from the Dundas-Roncesvalles triangle), while maintaining a hideout at a girlfriend's apartment on Wright Avenue.
- Samantha Bee – grew up in Roncesvalles, host of Full Frontal with Samantha Bee and comedian.
- Piya Chattopadhyay – journalist
- Katerina Cizek – documentary filmmaker and web creator.
- Daniel Lanois – Record producer and musician. Opened studio at 1 Howard Park Avenue in 2010.
- Archie P. McKishnie and Jean Blewett – brother and sister writers, lived at 353 Sunnyside Avenue. McKishnie wrote historical novels about pioneer life; Blewett wrote poetry and was an editor for The Globe and Mail.
- Taylor Mitchell – Country folk singer who grew up in the Roncesvalles area. She died from blood loss and severe injuries due to a coyote attack while hiking at Cape Breton Highlands National Park in 2009.
- William and Mary Neilson - dairy business from farm on Lynd Avenue.
- William Herbert Price – solicitor, MLA, Ontario attorney general, Ontario treasurer, lived at 7 Indian Grove.
- Percy Quinn – Humanitarian, alderman, businessman, professional hockey team owner. Lived at 92 Roncesvalles until his death in 1944.
- Morton Shulman – Former Coroner of Toronto, outspoken local NDP MPP for the provincial electoral district of High Park (now part of the larger Parkdale—High Park electoral district) and TV talk show host operated a family medical practice on Roncesvalles until he retired.
