= Sorauren (disambiguation) =

Sorauren is a village near Pamplona, Spain.

Sorauren may also refer to:

- Battle of Sorauren, part of the Battle of the Pyrenees
- Sorauren Avenue Park, Toronto, Canada
