= Jean Blewett =

Canadian journalist, author and poet

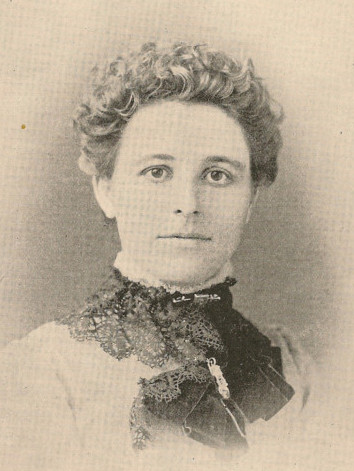
- Jean Blewett c. 1896
- Born: Janet McKishnie; 4 November 1862; Scotia, Kent County, Canada West
- Died: 19 August 1934 (aged 71); Chatham, Ontario
- Occupation: Newspaper editor
- Relatives: Eve Brodlique (cousin)
- Writing career
- Pen name: Katherine Kent
- Language: English

Signature
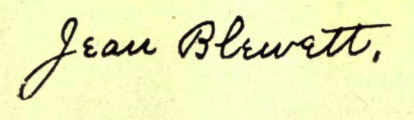

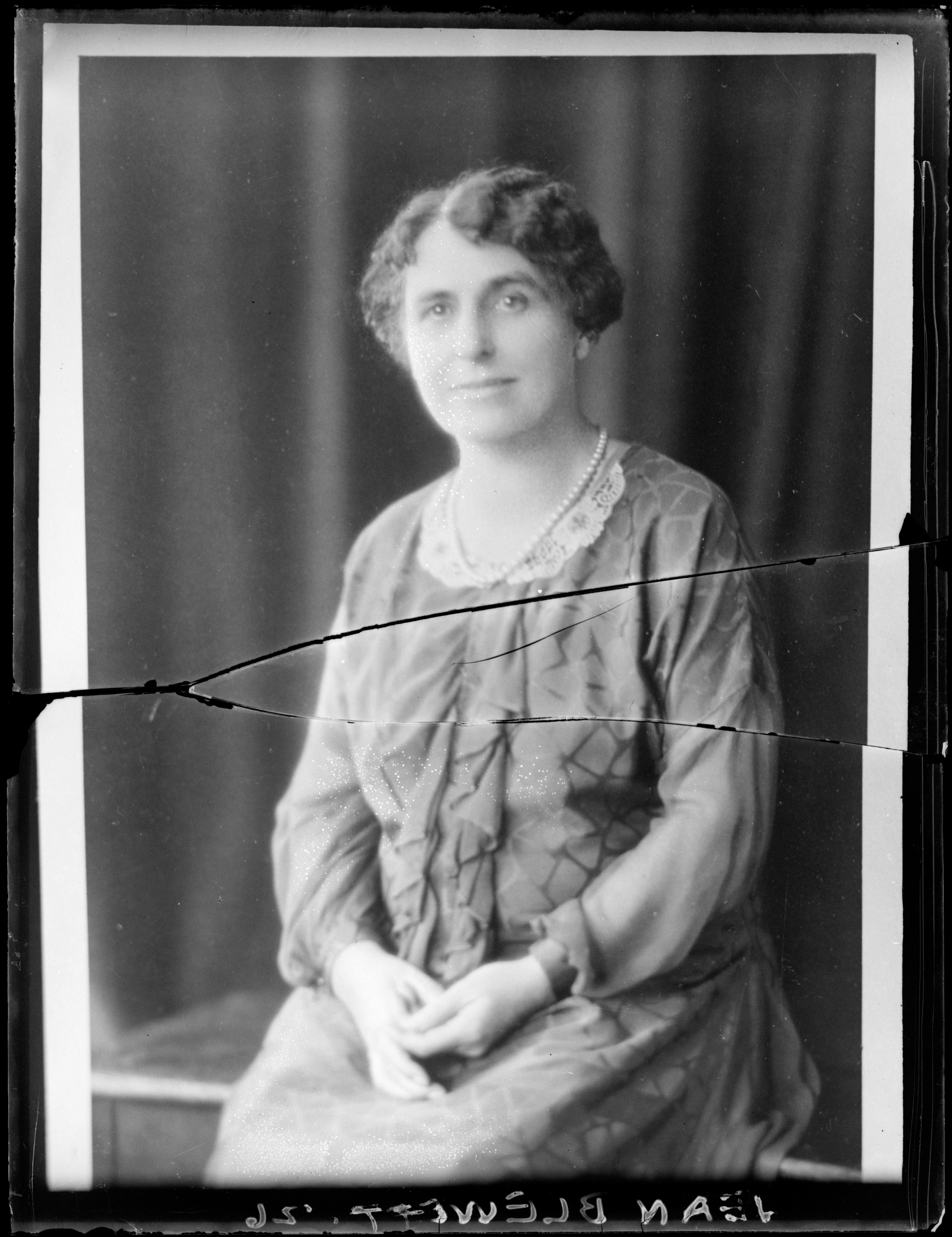
Jean Blewett, 1926

Jean McKishnie Blewett (pen name, Katherine Kent; 4 November 1862 – 19 August 1934) was a Canadian journalist, author and poet.

== Biography ==
Blewett was born Janet McKishnie in Scotia, Kent County, Canada West, in 1862 to Scottish immigrants (some sources say 1872). Eve Brodlique was her cousin.

She attended St. Thomas Collegiate and in 1879, married Bassett Blewett and published her first novel, Out of the Depths. In 1896, she won a US$600 prize from the Chicago Times-Herald for her poem "Spring".

Blewett was a regular contributor to The Globe, a Toronto newspaper and in 1898, became editor of its Homemakers Department. In 1919, assisted by the Imperial Order Daughters of the Empire, she published a booklet titled Heart Stories to benefit war charities. During this time, she regularly lectured on topics such as temperance and women's suffrage. She used the pseudonym "Katherine Kent" for some of her writing.

In 1925, Blewett was compelled by ill-health to retire her editorship. For two years, she lived with a daughter in Lethbridge, Alberta, before returning to Toronto in 1927. She died in 1934 in Chatham, Ontario.

After her death, fellow female journalist Bride Broder wrote in tribute:

There is a simplicity about Mrs. Blewett's prose and verse that has made a wide appeal, and her gay-hearted attitude to life, the humorous twists she gave to little things, made her very welcome as a speaker at women's gatherings. In all her writings she touched on the things that appeal to women everywhere and, in doing so, won the admiration of men readers also.

Her brother, Archie P. McKishnie, was also a noted writer.

== Selected works ==
- Out of the depths (novel). 1879 or 1890. (Note: Sources differ on the publication date for this novel.)
- Heart Songs. Toronto: G.N. Morang. 1889. p. 269. ISBN 9780665280948.
- The cornflower, and other poems. Toronto: W. Briggs. 1906. pp. 265.
- Blewett, Jean (1918). Garvin, John William (ed.). Canadian poems of the great war. Toronto: McClelland & Stewart. pp. 24–26.
- Heart Stories. Toronto: Warwick Bros. & Rutter. 1919. p. 40.
- Poems. Toronto: McClelland & Stewart. c. 1922. p. 272.
