= Sorauren Avenue Park =

Park in Toronto, Canada

Coordinates: 43°38′55.32″N 79°26′36.33″W

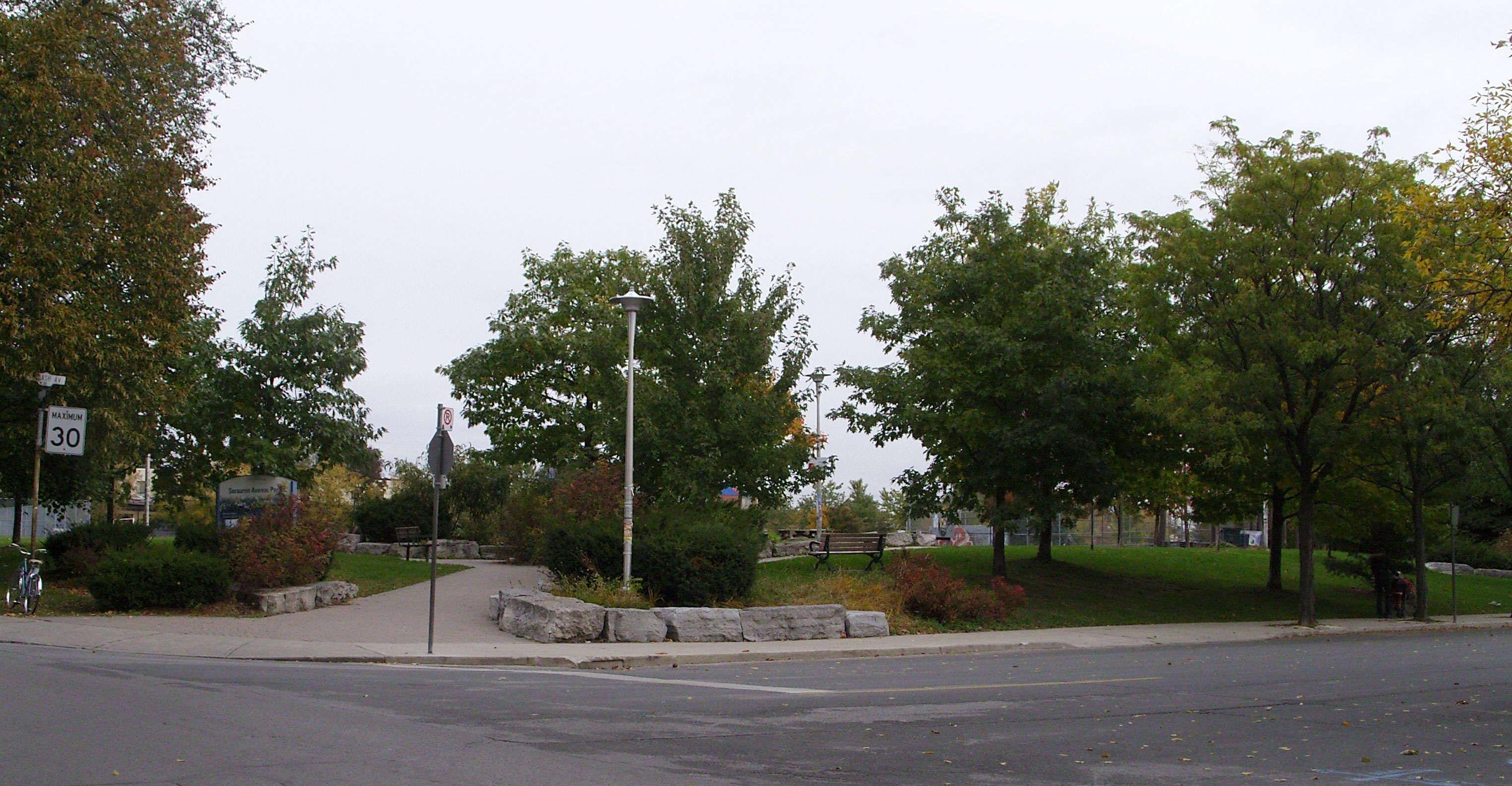
- Sorauren Park entrance
- Interactive map of Sorauren Avenue Park
- Type: Public park
- Location: Toronto, Ontario, Canada
- Area: 2.42 hectares (6.0 acres)
- Created: 1995
- Operator: City of Toronto

Sorauren Avenue Park is a park in the Roncesvalles neighbourhood of Toronto, Ontario, Canada. A reclaimed brown field site, it was created after the local community objected to City of Toronto government plans to convert a former bus garage into a facility for storing city vehicles. The park opened in 1995 and now hosts several sporting fields, a farmer's market and a fieldhouse for community gatherings.

== History ==
The location was first cleared in the 1800s for a farm. After the building of bordering rail lines, the site became a desirable location for industrial uses such as a linseed oil factory and a factory for the Dominion Bridge Company property at 289 Sorauren Avenue. The Toronto Transit Commission took over the factory and converted it into a bus garage on the site in the 1947, and used it until the 1960s, and it later became a repair and maintenance facility. The TTC stopped using the facility, which was contracted out for soundstage use for television series such as Captain Power. In the 1980s, the city planned to use the site to store trucks and other vehicles of its public works division. The community, notably local schools, rallied to cancel the plan and convert the site to open space, of which there was a lack in the area. The city council endorsed the plan to convert the bus garage site, clean it of toxins, and build a park. The park construction did not remove the concrete floor of the bus garage, which was instead filled over with soil. The park cost $700,000 and was officially opened on September 17, 1995 by Mayor Barbara Hall and Councillor Chris Korwin-Kuczynski.

== Facilities and usage ==
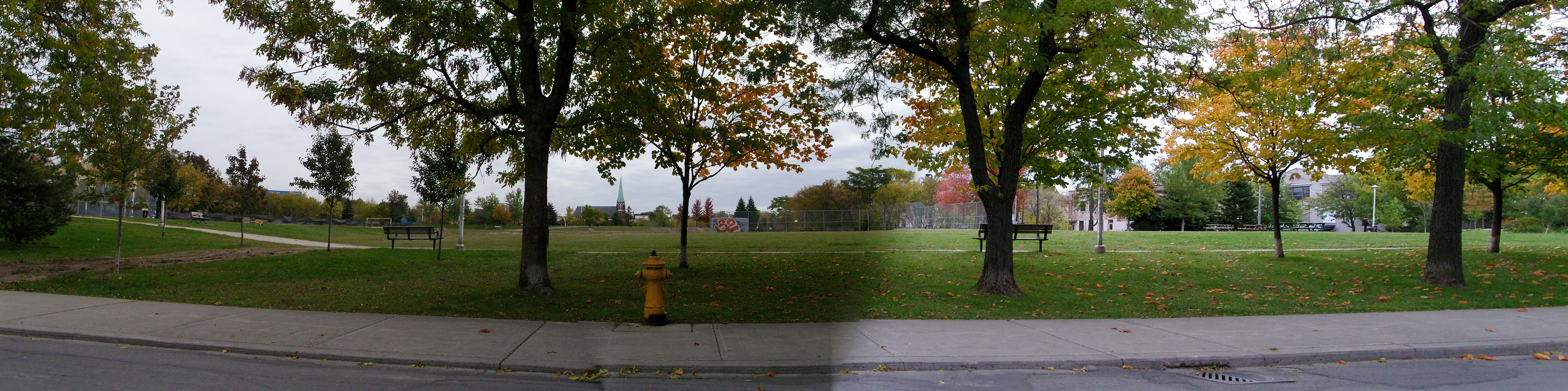
Panorama of Sorauren Avenue Park

The park has two mini-soccer fields for youth soccer, two tennis courts and one baseball diamond for sports. Open space is set aside for a dogs' off-leash area. In 2008, one of the former linseed oil buildings was converted to a fieldhouse, and is used for community meetings and community usage. In the wintertime, ice rinks are set up on the field.

A farmer's market is held each Monday by the West-End Food Co-op and sells local produce, meat, baked goods, soaps and services. The market is held outdoors except in winter, when it moves inside the field house.

After Halloween, neighbourhood residents bring their jack-o-lanterns for display for the one night following Halloween in the annual Pumpkin Parade. The pumpkins are placed around the paths of the park and number in the hundreds. The pumpkins are then collected by a City of Toronto crew the following day to be composted. A pumpkin sale is held a few days before the event, with proceeds going to park services and improvements. The Wabash Building Society estimates that nearly 2,000 pumpkins are on display annually.

== Future community centre and improvements ==
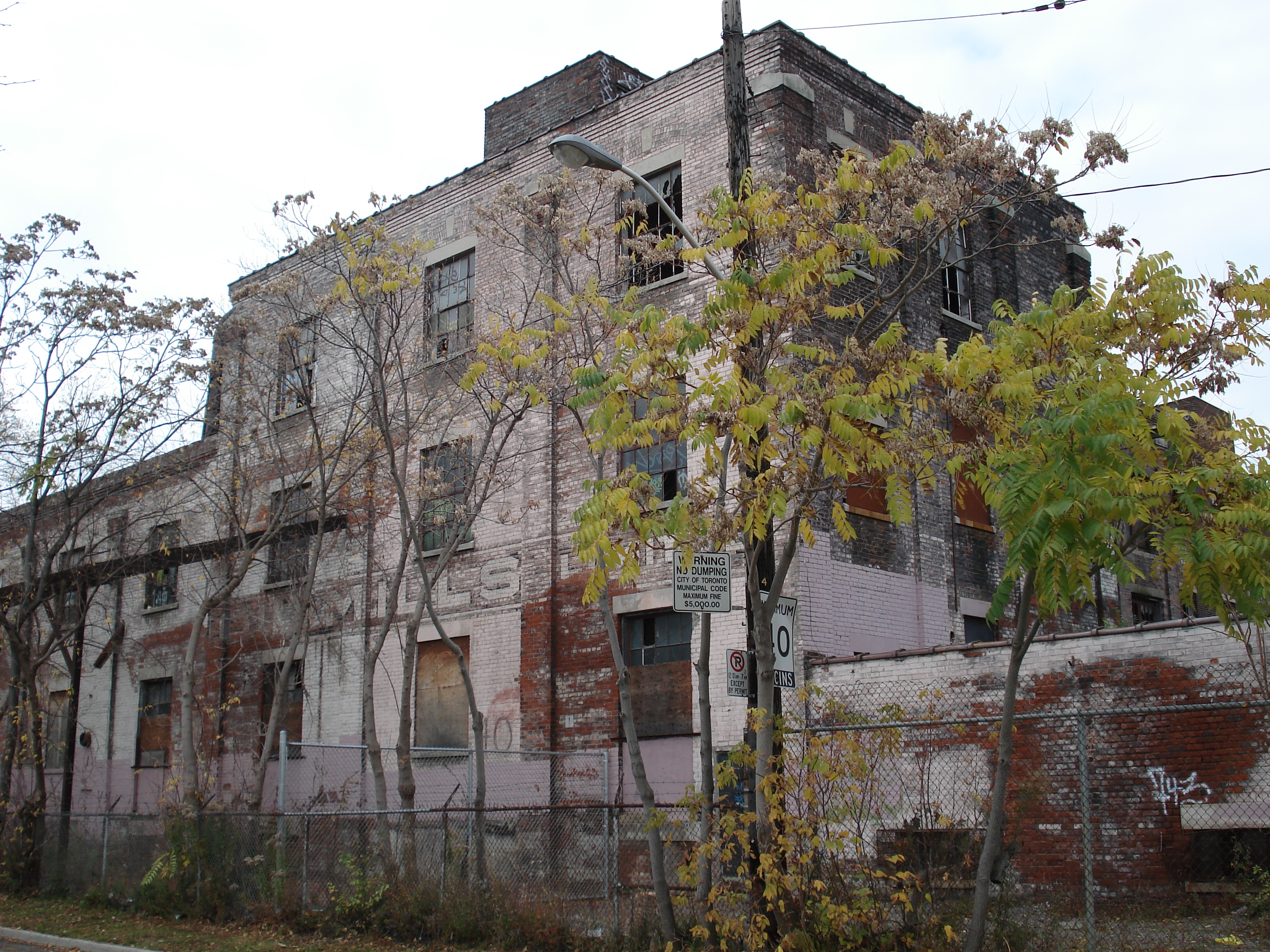
Former linseed oil factory

The former linseed oil factory, on the south boundary of the park along Wabash Avenue, is currently vacant. It was purchased by the city with the intent to be converted to a community centre. The centre project is approved by the city, but the actual start date will take place when funds are allocated to the project.

A "town square" was constructed in the area between the field house and the factory in 2014. Community fund-raising purchased much of the materials for the project, which was constructed by a contractor selected by the City of Toronto Parks Department.

A noise barrier is scheduled to be built between the park and the adjoining rail lines. It is part of a Metrolinx transit project to provide a rail link from Union Station to Pearson Airport. The lands of the oil factory are to be used as a staging area for noise barrier construction in the area of the park.

== Charles G. Williams Park ==
Across Wabash Avenue from Sorauren Park is the small park of Charles G. Williams Park. The park has a children's playground and a strip of green space stretching from Wabash to Wright Avenue behind the buildings of Sorauren Avenue. The park was created from two separate land purchases by the City of Toronto. The strip was first purchased from the purchase of a house on Wright to serve as a parkette. The second purchase, on the corner of Wabash and Sorauren, was the purchase of a warehouse by the city. The warehouse land was cleared and the playground was built. Williams Park was constructed before Sorauren Park.

== Holly Jones memorials ==
Holly Maria Jones was a ten-year-old Toronto girl who was murdered by Michael Briere in 2003. Jones and her family lived in the neighbourhood north of the park, near Bloor Street. Her death touched the neighbourhood greatly and several memorials were placed in the two Sorauren parks. In the Williams parkette, a large mural was painted by Shaun Turnbull on the eastern wall. In Sorauren Avenue Park, a bench was dedicated, a tree was planted and a garden area was planted in her memory. An unsuccessful proposal was made to rename the Sorauren Avenue park to Holly Jones Park. A mural was also painted in Perth Avenue Parkette, north of Bloor Street by Olaf Schneider.
