= Archie P. McKishnie =

Canadian author (1875–1946)

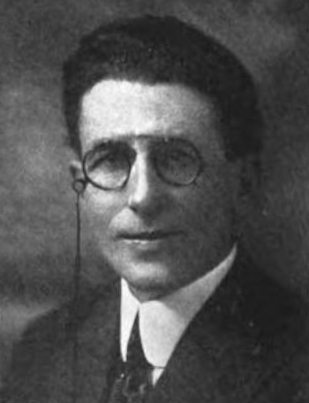
- Born: June 20, 1875; New Scotland, Chatham-Kent, Ontario
- Died: July 7, 1946 (aged 71); Toronto, Ontario
- Occupations: Author, short story writer, editor
- Writing career
- Period: 1907–1937
- Genres: Historical fiction, nature stories, juvenile fiction
- Notable works: Love of the wild (1910); Willow, the wisp (1918); A son of courage (1920)

Archie P. McKishnie (June 20, 1875 – July 7, 1946) was a popular Canadian author and short story writer.

== Biography ==
McKishnie was born on June 20, 1875, at Rondeau Point in New Scotland, Chatham-Kent, Ontario, and educated at Ridgetown Collegiate Institute. Before becoming a writer he was dramatic editor of the Sunday edition of The Toronto World newspaper. His stories have been categorized as historical fiction, nature stories, and juvenile stories. He was considered one of Canada's best nature writers of his day.

He was the brother of poet Jean Blewett.

He died at his home in Toronto on July 7, 1946.

McKishnie's archives are held by the William Ready Division of Archives and Research Collections at McMaster University.

== Selected works ==
- Gaff Linkum: A Tale of Talbotville. Toronto: Briggs, 1907. 255 p.
- Love of the Wild. Toronto: McLeod & Allen, 1910. 327 p.
- Willow, the Wisp. Toronto: Allen, 1918. 308 p.
- A Son of Courage. Toronto: Allen, 1920. 284 p.
- Openway. Toronto: Musson, 1922. 233 p.
- Big John Wallace: A Romance of the Early Canadian Pioneers. Toronto: Massey-Harris Press, 1922. 47 p.
- Mates of the Tangle. Toronto: Musson, 1924. 247 p.
- Brains, Limited. Toronto: Allen, 1925. 287 p. (Serialized in Maclean's Magazine, Dec. 1922 - March 1923.)
- Dwellers of the Marsh Realm. Chicago: Donohue, 1937. 79 p.
