= Bride Broder =

Canadian journalist

Georgina Cecilia Mary White (died 1944), better known by her pen name, Bride Broder, was a prominent Canadian journalist. She was the editor of The Mail and Empire's ladies' page and, after the merger which created The Globe and Mail, author of the paper's regular "Women's Point of View" column.
