= Toronto Railway Company Belt Line =

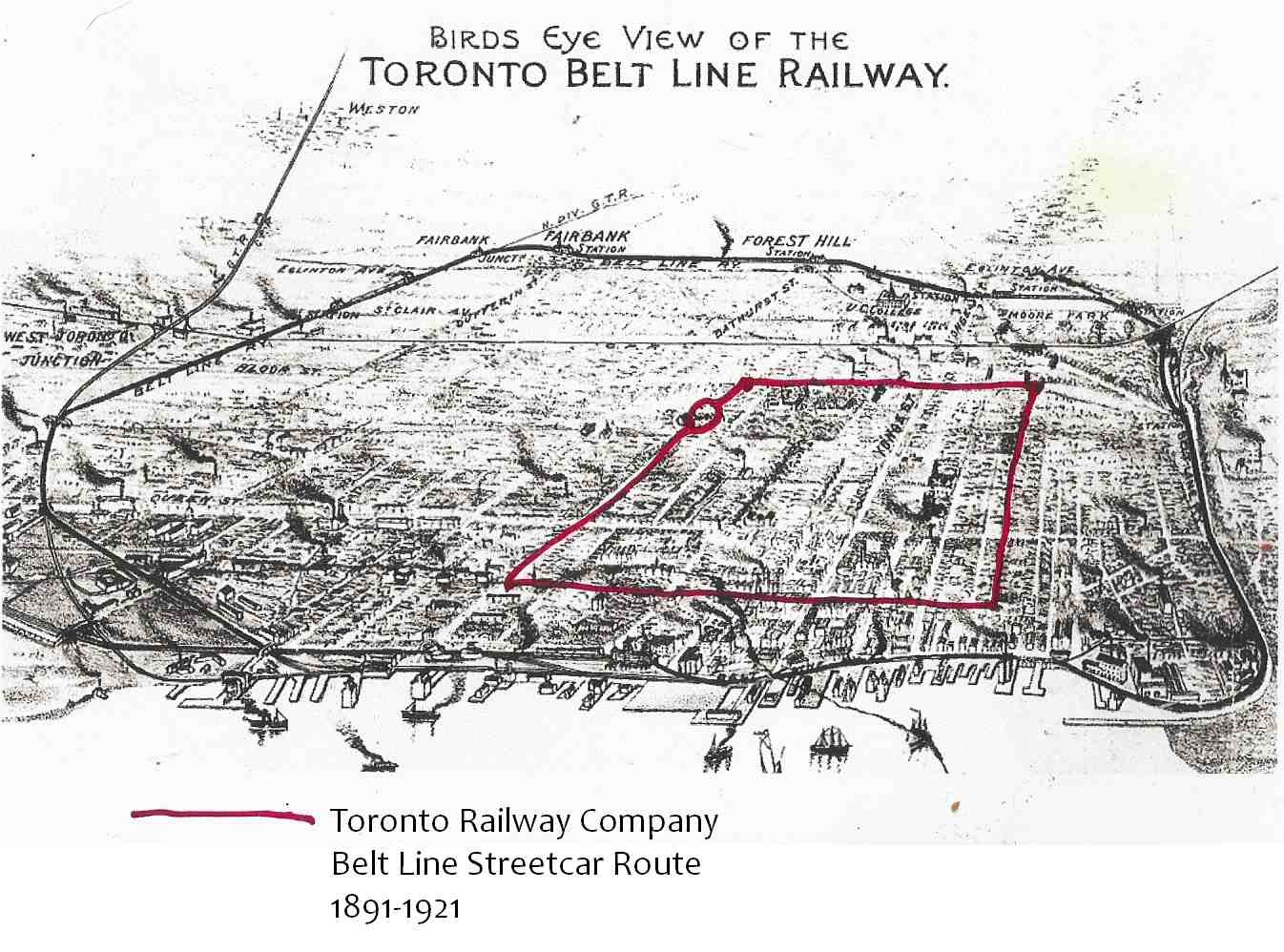
The Toronto Belt Line Railway and the Belt Line Streetcar Route

The Toronto Railway Company Belt Line was a streetcar route that operated in Toronto, Ontario, Canada. The route was created by the Toronto Railway Company in 1891 and taken over by the Toronto Transportation Commission in 1921, which cancelled the route in 1923 as part of its reorganization of streetcar routes.

The Belt Line operated on a rectangular route over four streets: King Street, Spadina Avenue, Bloor Street and Sherbourne Street. Belt Line streetcars operated in both directions over this circular route, which had no terminals.

== Timeline ==
On November 16, 1891, (Note: Another source says the Belt Line started earlier, on September 21, 1891.) the Belt Line began operation as a horsecar line. The Toronto Railway Company created the route by amalgamating pre-existing horsecar services operating along Spadina Avenue, Bloor Street and Sherbourne Street. The new route was popular: it operated late at night and often required extra trips. There was still a separate Bloor route that operated west of Spadina Avenue, and entered downtown via Spadina Avenue, Queen Street, York Street and Front Street. The Belt Line and King streetcar routes overlapped on King street between Sherbourne Street and Spadina Avenue.

On December 15, 1892, (Note: Another source says that horsecars continued to provide night service until July 2, 1894.) the horsecars on the route were replaced by electric streetcars.

On December 15, 1918, Bloor streetcar service was modified to run from Lansdowne Avenue in the west end over the newly opened Prince Edward Viaduct to end at Broadview Avenue in the east. Thus, the Belt Line and Bloor routes overlapped along Bloor Street in both directions between Spadina Avenue and Sherbourne Street.

On September 1, 1921, the newly created Toronto Transportation Commission took over the streetcar systems of the privately owned Toronto Railway Company and the City-owned Toronto Civic Railways. The TTC would integrate the two systems.

On July 1, 1923, the TTC made a major reorganization of streetcar routes in the city. The Belt Line was one of six routes discontinued in the reorganization, its last day being June 30, 1923.

== Legacy ==
With the route reorganization effective July 1, 1923, other street car routes served the four sections (King, Spadina, Bloor and Sherbourne) of the Belt Line after its cancellation. The following is a brief description on the fate of each section.

Since 1874, streetcars have continued to serve King Street including the section between Sherbourne Street and Spadina Avenue where the King and Belt Line routes used to overlap. Today, the King streetcar route is known as 504 King, its present-day routing originating from the route reorganization of 1923.

In 1923, the Spadina section of the Belt Line was replaced by a new Spadina streetcar line, which ran from Bloor Street to Front Street and was extended south to Fleet Street (now Lake Shore Boulevard) in 1927. The line used crossovers to reverse double-ended streetcars as the line had no loops. The line was replaced by buses in 1948. The Harbord streetcar line continued to use the tracks on Spadina Avenue between Harbord and College Streets until its demise in 1966. Tracks between King and College Streets were retained for short turns and diversions. However, in 1997, the TTC opened another new Spadina streetcar line (today's 510 Spadina) along Spadina Avenue from Spadina station to Queens Quay and onwards to Union Station.

In 1923, the Bloor section of the Belt Line was served by a new crosstown Bloor route running from Luttrell Loop on Danforth Avenue in eastern Toronto to Lansdowne Avenue in the west end, extended further west to Jane Loop in 1925. In 1966, most of the Bloor streetcar line was replaced by the Bloor–Danforth subway line (now Line 2 Bloor–Danforth). Subway extensions replaced the remaining outer ends of the Bloor streetcar line in 1968.

In 1923, a new Sherbourne streetcar route took over the Sherbourne section of the Belt Line. Initially, it ran from South Drive in Rosedale south on Sherbourne Street to King Street, then west to York Street and south to the old Union Station. Later, the Sherbourne route was shortened to end at the Frederick Loop between Frederick and Sherbourne Streets just south of King Street. Buses replaced the Sherbourne streetcar in 1947.

== See also ==
- TTC Belt Line tour
