= Beltline =

A Beltline (or Belt Line) is a short-line railway operating in and around a city, principally to transfer freight between long-haul railroads and/or other modes of transportation. The term may also refer to:

== Places ==
- Atlanta Beltline, a multi-use trail around central Atlanta, Georgia, United States
- Beltline Trail, a multi-use trail in Toronto, Ontario, Canada
- Beltline, Calgary, a neighbourhood of Calgary, Alberta, Canada

== Transportation ==
=== Roads in the United States ===
- The Beltline, a section of Alabama State Route 67 in Decatur, Alabama
- The Beltline/ Beltline Hwy, a section of Interstate 65 in Mobile, Alabama
- M-6 (Michigan highway) or South Beltline, a freeway in Grand Rapids, Michigan
- Interstate 440 (North Carolina) or Raleigh Beltline, a loop road around Raleigh, North Carolina
- Oregon Route 569, originally called Belt Line Road, a freeway (originally proposed as a beltway) in the Eugene, Oregon area
- Belt Line Road (Texas), a loop in the Dallas, Texas area
- Beltline Highway, part of U.S. Route 12 in the Madison, Wisconsin area

=== Rail services ===
==== Canada ====
- Toronto Belt Line Railway, an 1890s commuter railroad in Toronto, Ontario, Canada
- Toronto Railway Company Belt Line (1891–1923), a streetcar line in Toronto, Ontario, Canada
- TTC Belt Line tour (mid 1970s), heritage streetcars that ran on the old Belt Line route in Toronto, Ontario, Canada

==== United States ====
- Akron and Barberton Belt Railroad, Ohio
- Baltimore Belt Line, built by the Baltimore and Ohio Railroad in 1895, Baltimore, Maryland
- Belt Railway of Chicago, Illinois
- Indiana Harbor Belt Railroad, a belt line railway in the Chicago, Illinois area
- San Francisco Belt Railroad

=== Other transportation ===
- a general term for a beltway or ring road
- Beltline (automotive), a line representing the bottom edge of a vehicle's glass panels
