= Harbord streetcar line =

Former Toronto streetcar line (closed 1966)

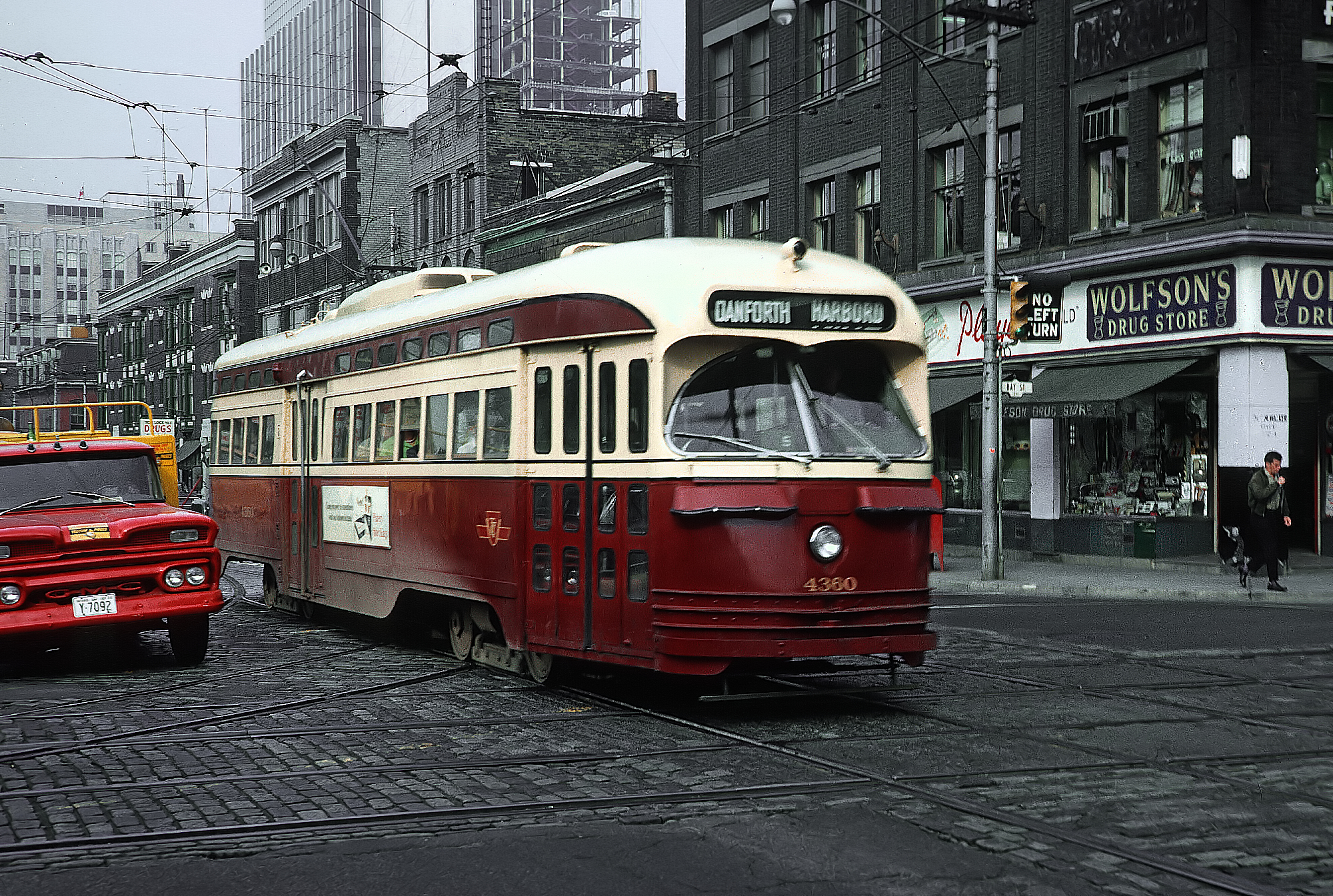
Harbord Streetcar eastbound on Dundas Street at Bay Street, 1965

The Harbord streetcar line was an east–west line within the Toronto streetcar system. The route was named after Harbord Street even though only a small portion of the route was along the namesake street. One distinct characteristic of the route was its zip-zag nature, making many 90-degree turns onto the various streets along its route. The route was retired in 1966 when the Toronto Transit Commission (TTC) opened the Bloor–Danforth subway line (today Line 2 Bloor–Danforth), the city's first east–west subway line.

== Evolution of the route ==
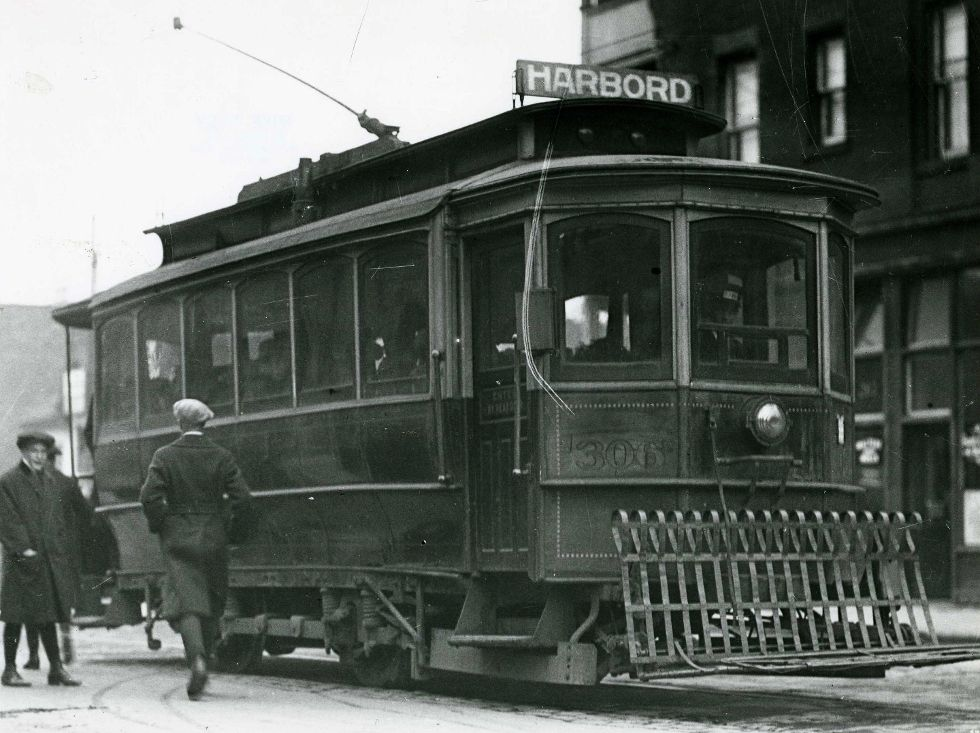
Toronto Railway Company streetcar on the Harbord route

Prior to the creation of the TTC in 1921, the Toronto Railway Company had a 30-year franchise to operate streetcar services in Toronto, and it was the TRC that established streetcar service on Harbord Street.

Between 1910 and 1911, the TRC constructed tracks on Harbord Street between Spadina Avenue and Ossington Avenue. During that same period, the TRC laid tracks on Adelaide Street between Church Street and Spadina Avenue, and on Ossington Avenue between Harbord Street and Bloor Street. Thus, in 1911, the first version of the Harbord route came into operation from Church Street, west on Adelaide Street, north on Spadina Avenue, west on Harbord Street and north on Ossington Avenue to Bloor Street.

In 1915, the TRC extended the Harbord route north of Bloor Street running north on Ossington Avenue, west on Hallam Street, north on Dufferin Street, west on Lappin Avenue to Lansdowne Avenue. There was a wye at the western end of the route at Lapin and Lansdowne avenues. At the eastern end of the route, streetcars looped from eastbound on Adelaide Street, north on Victoria Street, west on Richmond Street, south on Church Street returning to Adelaide Street westbound. This became the route that the TTC would inherit in 1921, when the TRC's franchise expired.

On February 22, 1923, the TTC extended the Harbord route from Lapin Avenue, north on Lansdowne Avenue to the new Royce Loop at the southeast corner of Royce Avenue (today Dupont Street) and Lansdowne Avenue.

Starting October 23, 1927, the TTC had two versions of the Harbord route, one for Monday through Saturday with the eastern terminal at Adelaide and Church streets, and a substantially different route for Sundays. Both versions shared a common path west of Spadina Avenue. The eastbound Sunday route went south on Spadina Avenue, east on Dundas Street, north on Broadview Avenue, east on Gerard Street, north on Carlaw Avenue, east on Riverdale Avenue, north on Pape Avenue ending at the Lipton Loop at Lipton Avenue, one block north of Danforth Avenue.

On April 3, 1933, the Sunday route became the overall route, and Harbord streetcars would not terminate at Adelaide and Church streets. The complete route from west to east from Royce Loop, south on Lansdowne Avenue, west on Lappin Avenue, south on Dufferin Street, east on Hallam Street, south on Ossington Avenue, east on Harbord Street, south on Spadina Avenue, east on Dundas Street, north on Broadview Avenue, east on Gerrard Street, north on Carlaw Avenue, east on Riverdale Avenue and north on Pape Avenue to Lipton Loop. Between the end loops, the route traveled on some portion of thirteen different streets, making 90-degree turns between each pair of streets. At that time, the Dundas streetcar route served only Dundas Street West, leaving Dundas Street East to be served by the Harbord streetcar.

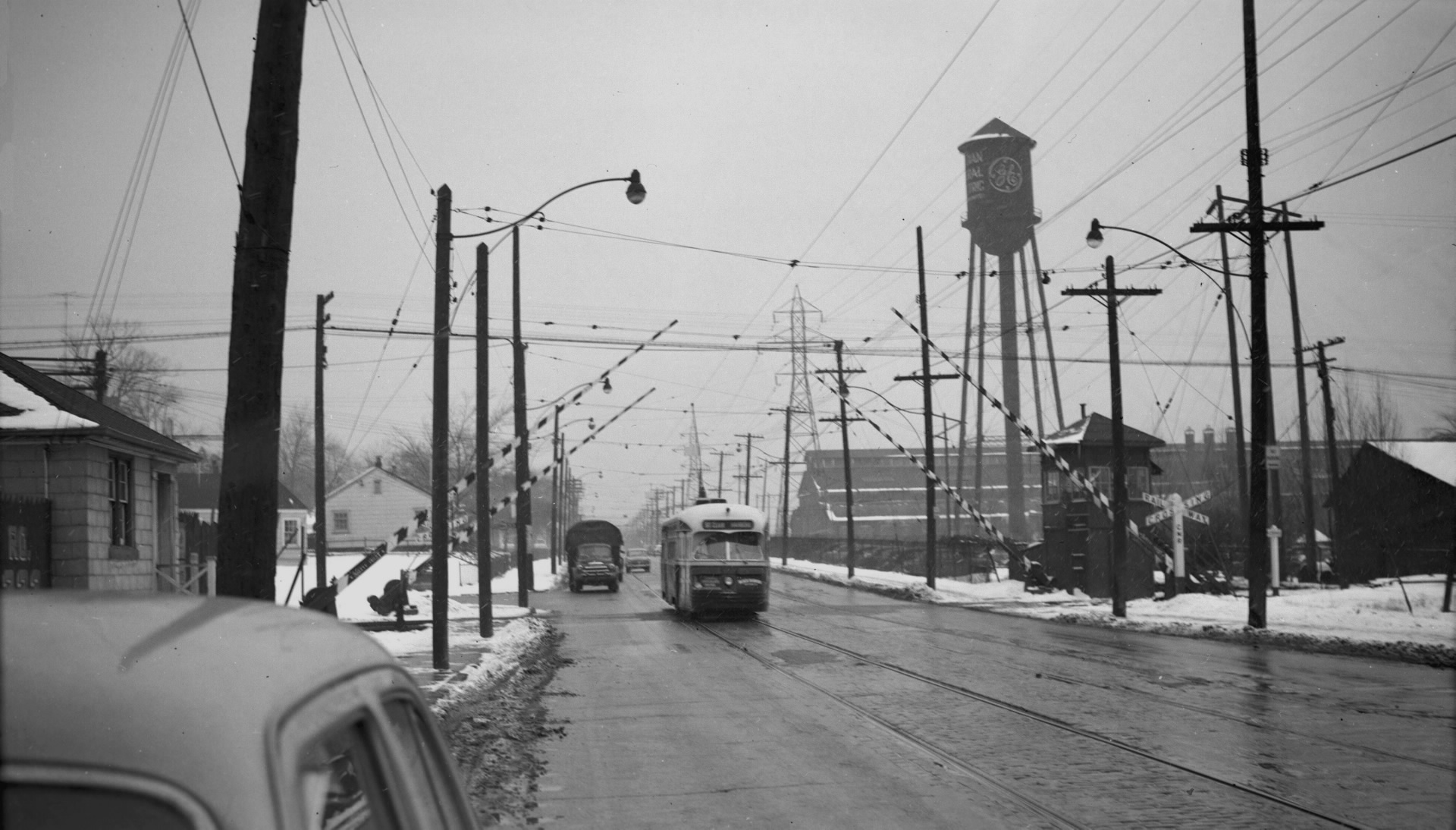
Westbound Harbord streetcar on Davenport Road at C.N.R. level crossing in February 1953

On December 8, 1945, the western terminal of the Harbord route was changed from Royce Loop to Townsley Loop, one block north of St. Clair Avenue, thus lengthening the western end of the route. With the expansion of trolley bus service, the Davenport streetcar was being replaced by the Ossington trolley bus on Ossington Avenue south of College Street, and by the Harbord streetcar north of Bloor Street. Streetcar service on Hallam Street and Lippin Avenue became redundant because of proximity to the Annette trolley bus line. Using pre-existing track, the revised western portion of the Harbord route ran from Ossington Avenue, west on Bloor Street, north on Dovercourt Road, west on Davenport Road, north on Old Weston Road to the Townsley Loop.

On March 1, 1947, the Royce Loop was paved over to convert it from a streetcar to a trolley bus loop.

On January 21, 1957, the western end of the Harbord route was permanently cut back to the St. Clarins Loop. A bus loop had been added to the St. Clarins Loop. The City of Toronto wanted to replace the level crossing on Davenport Road between Caledonia Park Road and Wiltshire Avenue with an underpass. Until then, the level crossing had carried the tracks of the Harbord route. Tracks were never relaid in the new Davenport railway underpass. With this change, only the tracks on Bathurst Street would connect the St. Clair streetcar line to the rest of the Toronto streetcar system.

== Last years ==
With the removal of tracks from the Davenport railway level crossing in January 1957, the Harbord route entered its final form. The route from east to west ran from Lipton Loop (Pape Avenue and Lipton Avenue, just north of Danforth Avenue), south on Pape Avenue, west on Riverdale Avenue, south on Carlaw Avenue, west on Gerrard Street, south on Broadview Avenue, west on Dundas Street, north on Spadina Avenue, west on Harbord Street, north on Ossington Avenue, west on Bloor Street, north on Dovercourt Road, west on Davenport Road to St. Clarins Loop at St. Clarens Avenue.

The last day for the Harbord route was February 25, 1966, the day before the opening of the Bloor–Danforth subway line (today Line 2 Bloor–Danforth). Harbord was one of five streetcar routes abandoned with the opening of the subway; the others were Bloor, Fort (partly replaced by the 511 Bathurst), Parliament and Coxwell.

Surface routes were modified or created to serve former Harbord stops. The 72 Pape bus covered the route from Pape Street to Gerrard Street. The Dundas streetcar (505 Dundas) was extended onto Dundas Street East and then north on Broadview Avenue to Broadview station. Harbord Street was covered by the 94 Wellesley bus, which connected to Ossington station. Various bus routes evolved to cover the Harbord route north of Bloor Street.

== Lipton Loop ==
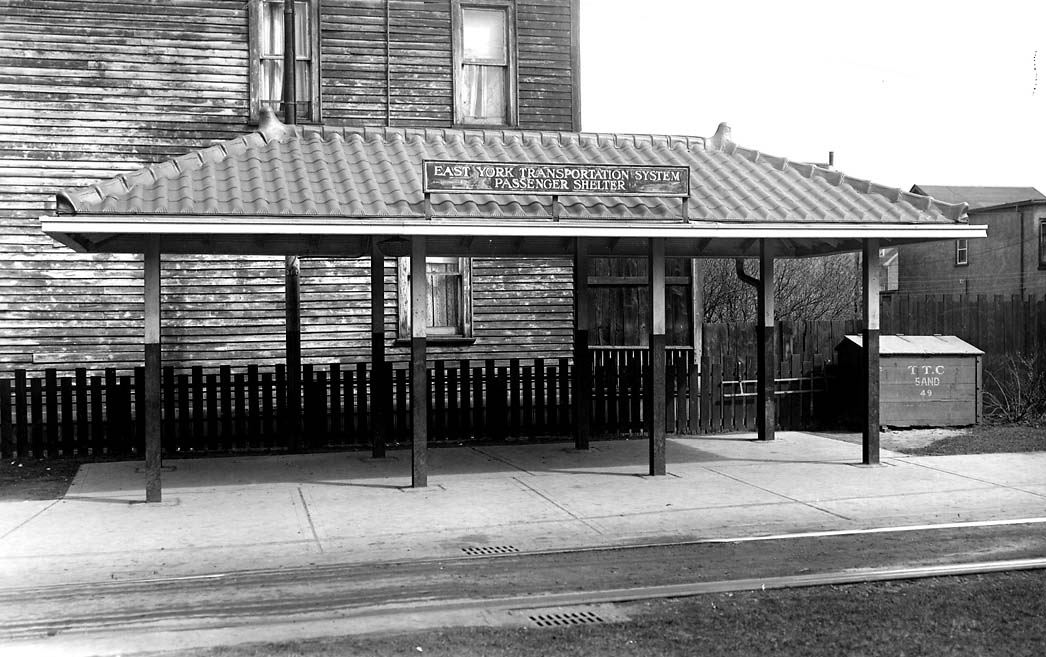
Lipton Loop in 1931

The Lipton Loop went into service on October 23, 1927, being used by the now-defunct College streetcar as well as by the Sunday Harbord streetcar service. The loop was located at the northeast corner of Pape Avenue and Lipton Avenue, one block north of Danforth Avenue. The loop ran counter-clockwise.

A bus service was established north on Pape Avenue from the Lipton Loop. This service was meant to be temporary. The Township of East York initially paved only the outside lanes, leaving the inside lanes unpaved for future streetcar tracks. When the Lipton Loop was built, there the intention to extend the streetcar tracks further north on Pape Avenue, over the Leaside Bridge into the Leaside industrial area via Millwood Road. For this purpose, the Leaside Bridge was built reinforced with extra steel to carry streetcar traffic. Also, there were short stubs for a double track extension at the north end of Lipton Loop. No further construction occurred because of Great Depression.

Circa 1962, the Lipton Loop had to be modified to accommodate construction of Pape station on the Bloor–Danforth subway line. Streetcars entered the old loop via Lipton Avenue and ran counter-clockwise exiting near the south side of the building at 749 Pape Avenue. The new loop was slightly to the north of the old loop. Streetcars entered from Pape Avenue on the south side of the aforementioned building, turned through a lane on the east side of the building and exited on Gertrude Place to return to Pape Avenue.
