= Woodbine station =

Toronto subway station

Woodbine
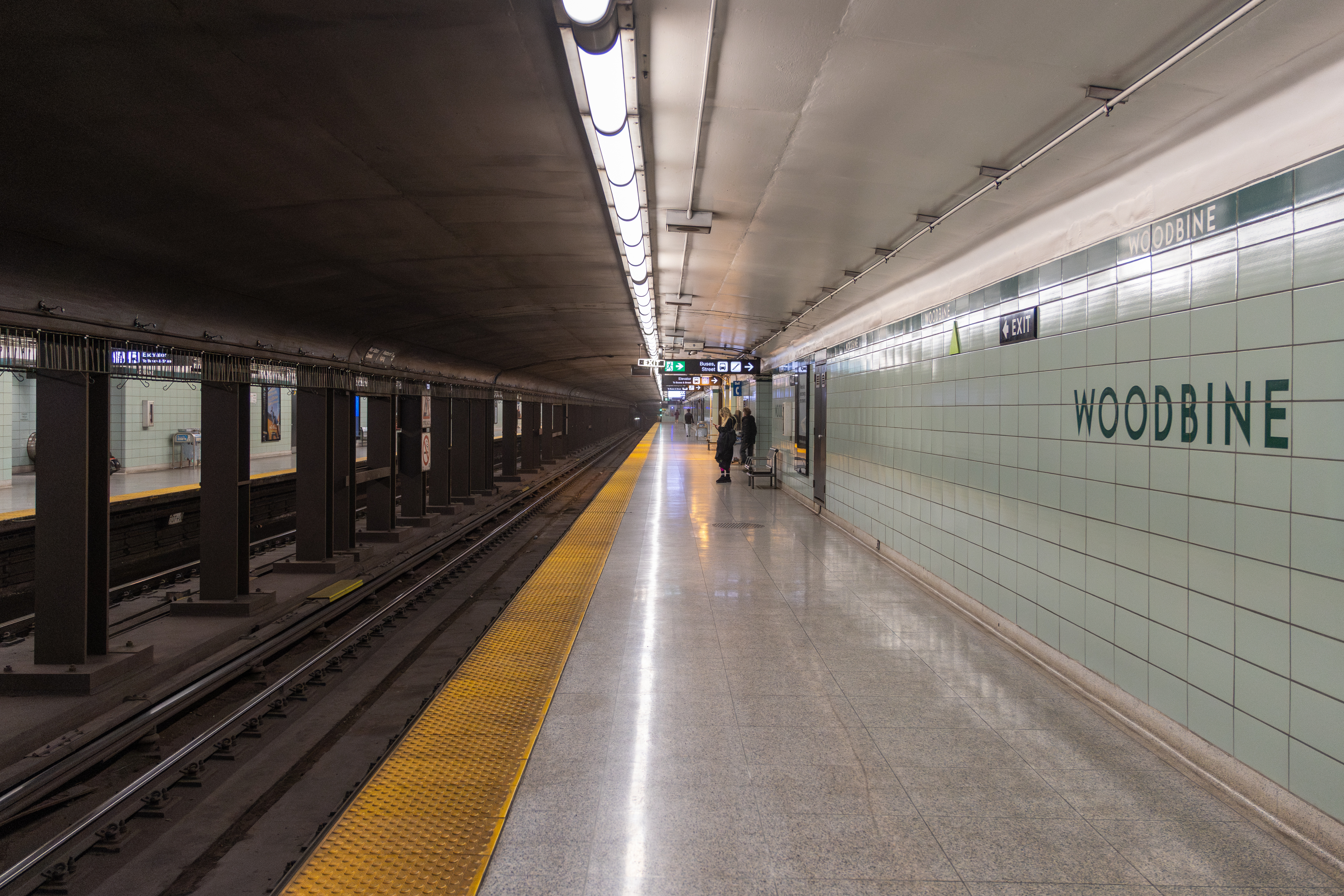
- Westbound platform

General information
- Location: 991 Woodbine Avenue; Toronto, Ontario, Canada
- Coordinates: 43°41′11″N 79°18′45″W
- Platforms: Side platforms
- Tracks: 2
- Connections: TTC buses: 91 Woodbine; 92 Woodbine South; 93 Parkview Hills; 300 Bloor – Danforth

Construction
- Structure type: Underground
- Accessible: Yes

Other information
- Website: Official station page

History
- Opened: February 26, 1966; 60 years ago

Passengers
- 2023–2024: 10,803
- Rank: 55 of 70

Services
Preceding station	Toronto Transit Commission	Following station
Coxwell towards Kipling	Line 2 Bloor–Danforth	Main Street towards Kennedy
Location

Woodbine is a subway station on Line 2 Bloor–Danforth in Toronto, Ontario, Canada. The station is at the southeast corner of Woodbine Avenue and Strathmore Boulevard, just north of Danforth Avenue. The station opened in 1966 and was the eastern terminus of the line until 1968.

== Description ==
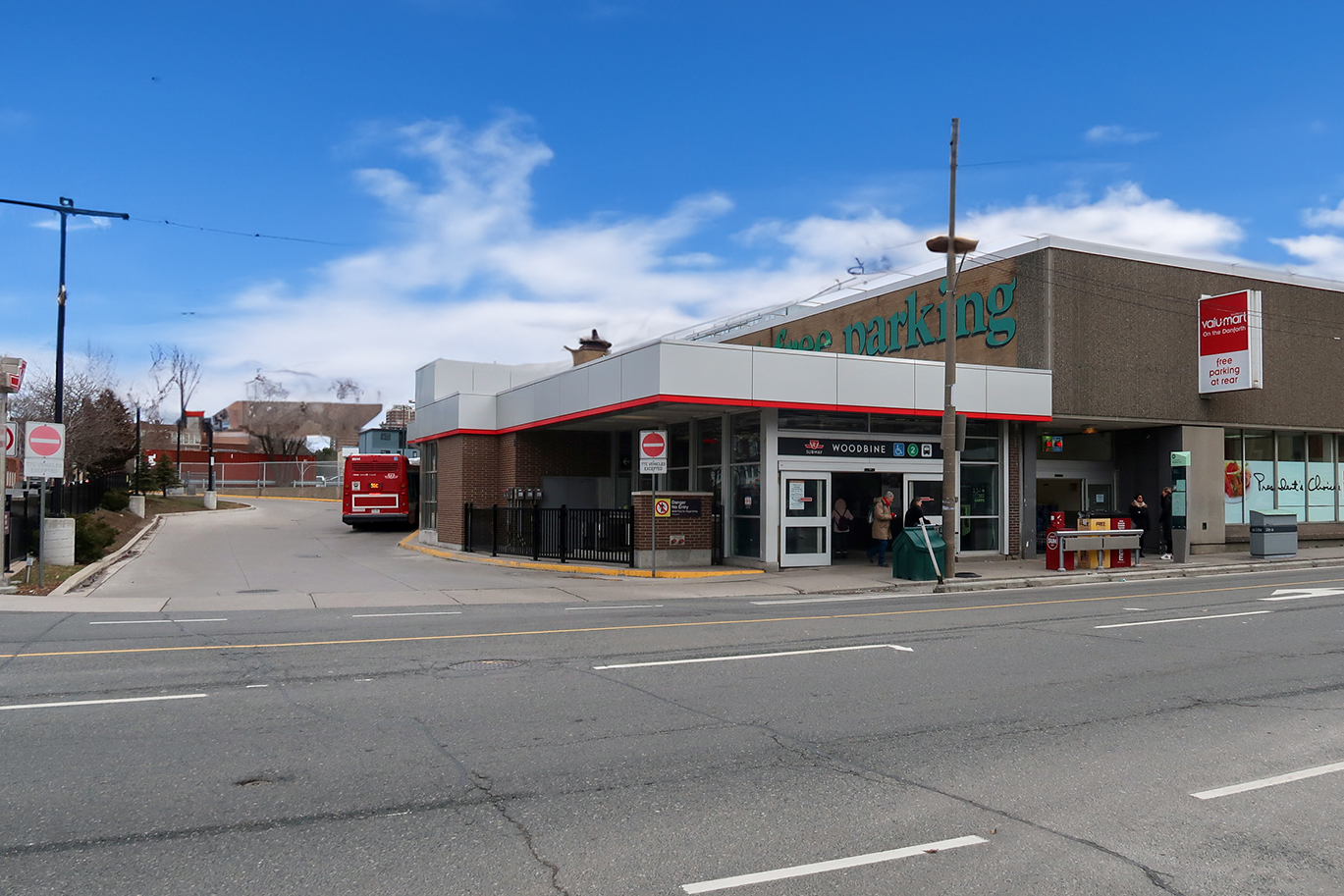
Station exterior

The main entrance, collector, and bus platform are at street level (on the northeast corner of Woodbine and Danforth), the concourse is on the second level, and the subway platforms are on the lower level. The bus platform has 2 bus bays. Wi-Fi service is available at this station. Automatic sliding doors, accessible fare gates and the addition of elevators, made the station fully accessible in late September 2017 which also coincided with the opening of a new secondary automated entrance on the northwest corner of Woodbine and Danforth.

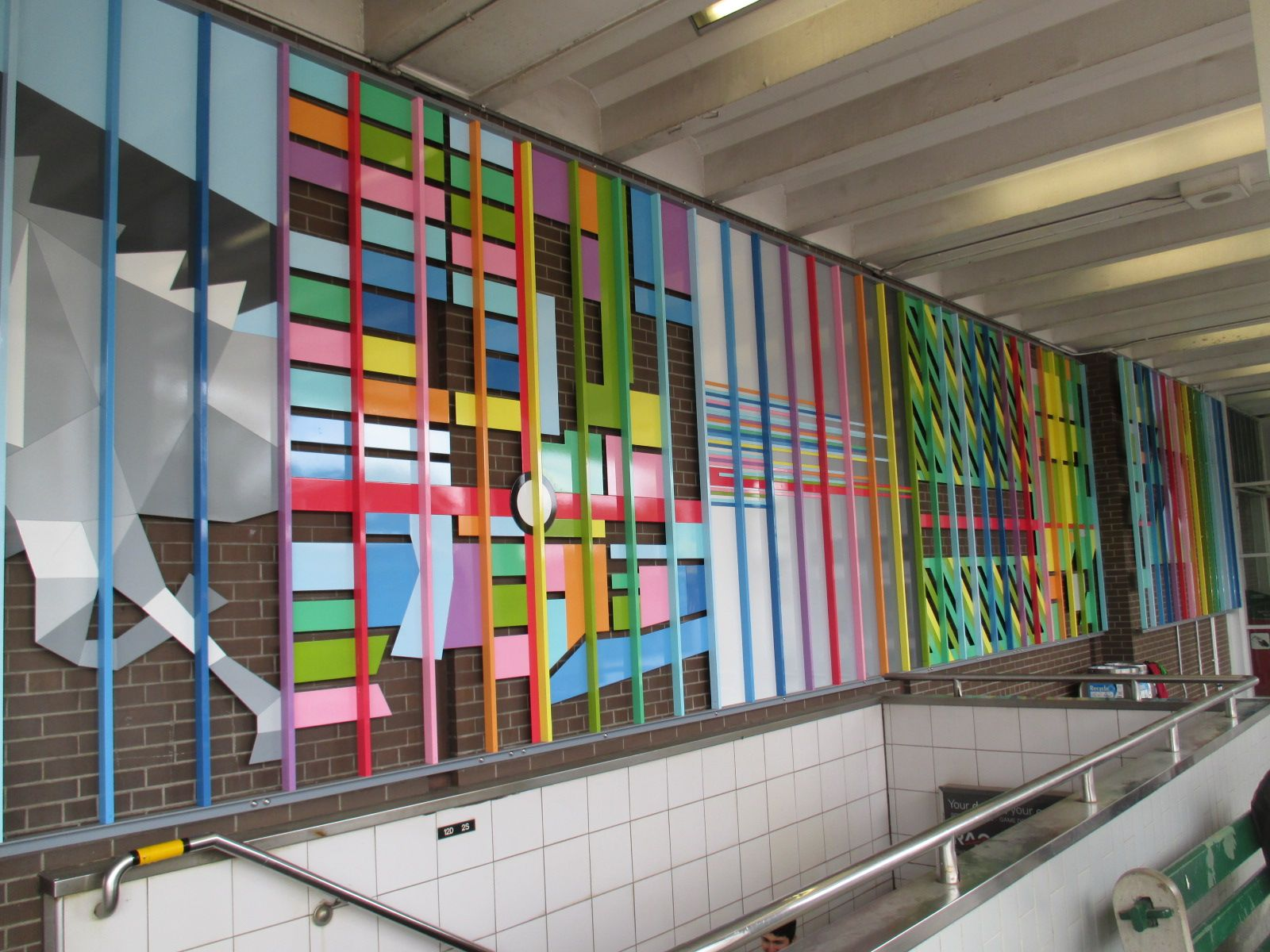
Artwork Directions Intersections Connections by Marmin Borins

The artwork titled Directions Intersections Connections by Marmin Borins hangs on the exterior wall at the station's bus platform. Covering 93 m^{2} (1,000 sq ft), the artwork consists of brightly coloured coated metal panels arranged in geometric patterns. According to the TTC's Public Art page, the geometric patterns "express the motion and directional routes of transit, the intersections of communities and place, and the connections of site to both the present and the past".

== History ==
Woodbine station was opened in 1966 as the eastern terminus of the original Bloor–Danforth line. Although the station was a terminus for two years, it was known that this would be temporary, so it was built with side platforms rather than a single centre platform that would have conveniently served departures from either track.

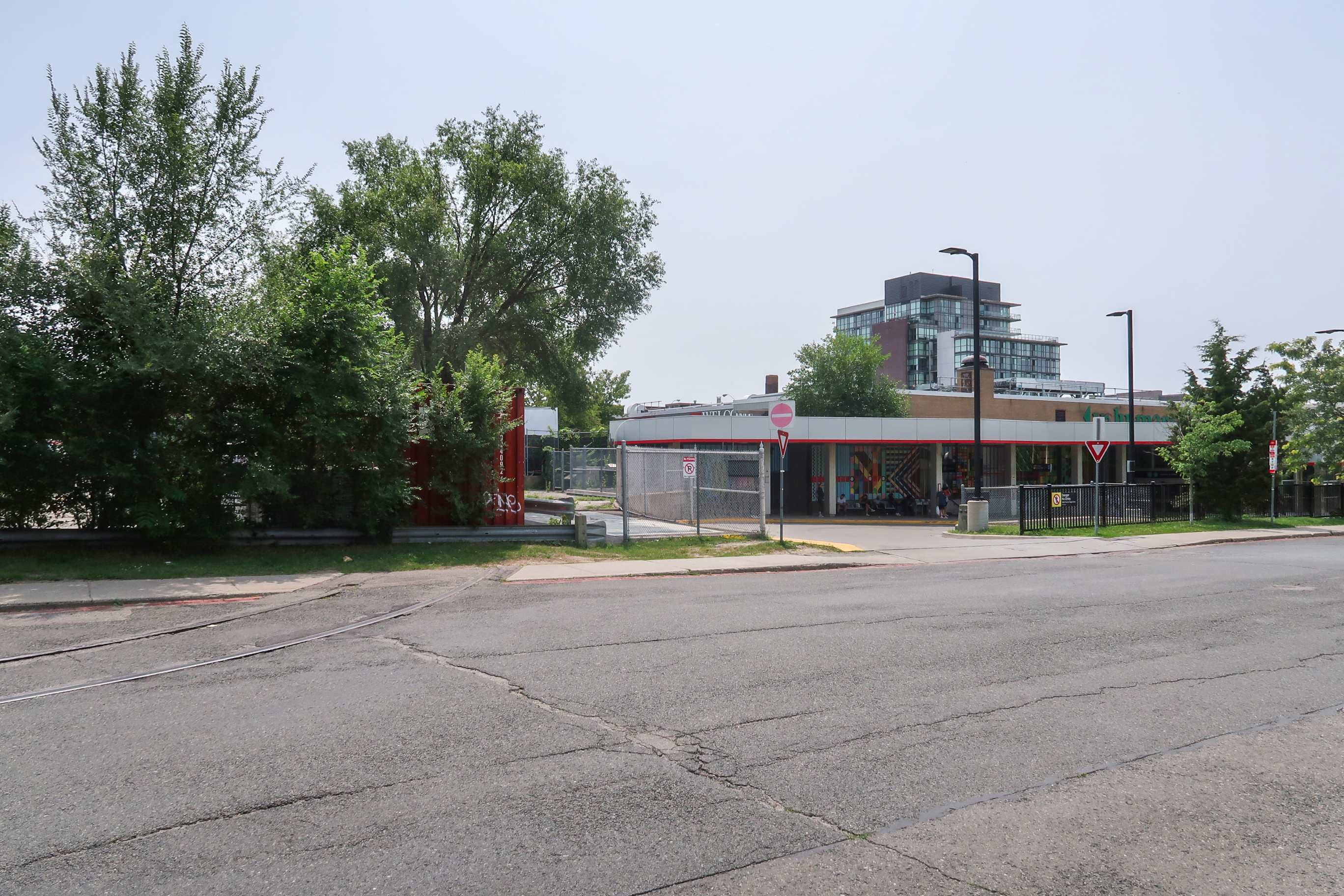
Disused section of streetcar track on Strathmore Boulevard

The Bloor–Danforth subway line replaced the Bloor streetcar line, which ran from Jane Loop to Luttrell Loop, near the present Jane and Victoria Park stations. With the opening of the subway from Keele to Woodbine in 1966, streetcar service was reduced to a short Bloor route from Jane Loop to Keele station, and a Danforth route from Woodbine station to Luttrell Loop. These portions were in turn eliminated when the subway was extended in 1968 to run from Islington to Warden. However, evidence of the temporary loop at Woodbine station for Danforth streetcars still exists: a single disconnected streetcar track runs west from Cedarvale Avenue along Strathmore Boulevard, curving towards the east end of the station, and an irregular wall in the station's mezzanine indicates the former passage to the streetcar platform. The walled-off section of this passage has been partially converted into a staff room and storage area.

== Surface connections ==
TTC routes serving the station include:

Bay number	Route	Name	Additional information
1	91	Woodbine	Northbound to Lawrence Avenue East via Sloane station
1	93	Parkview Hills	Northbound to Parkview Hills
2	92	Woodbine South	Southbound to Lake Shore Boulevard East (Ashbridge's Bay Loop – Woodbine Beach)
2	Wheel-Trans		

== Automatic entrance ==
In June 2010, the TTC announced plans to add secondary entrances and exits to 3 subway stations on Line 2. They were recommended after a fire safety audit due to the stations only having one primary means of emergency access and egress. The plan was to construct a new unstaffed automated entrance at surface level on Strathmore Boulevard. In order to build these new access points, the TTC expropriated residential land and demolished a home on the northwest corner of Woodbine and Strathmore. The decision to do so proved controversial in the neighbourhoods affected; although the TTC stated it would review their plan, it ultimately went ahead. Construction of the new unstaffed automated entrance was completed in September 2017. It is accessible to Presto card holders only.
