= Bloor streetcar line =

Former Toronto streetcar line (closed 1966)

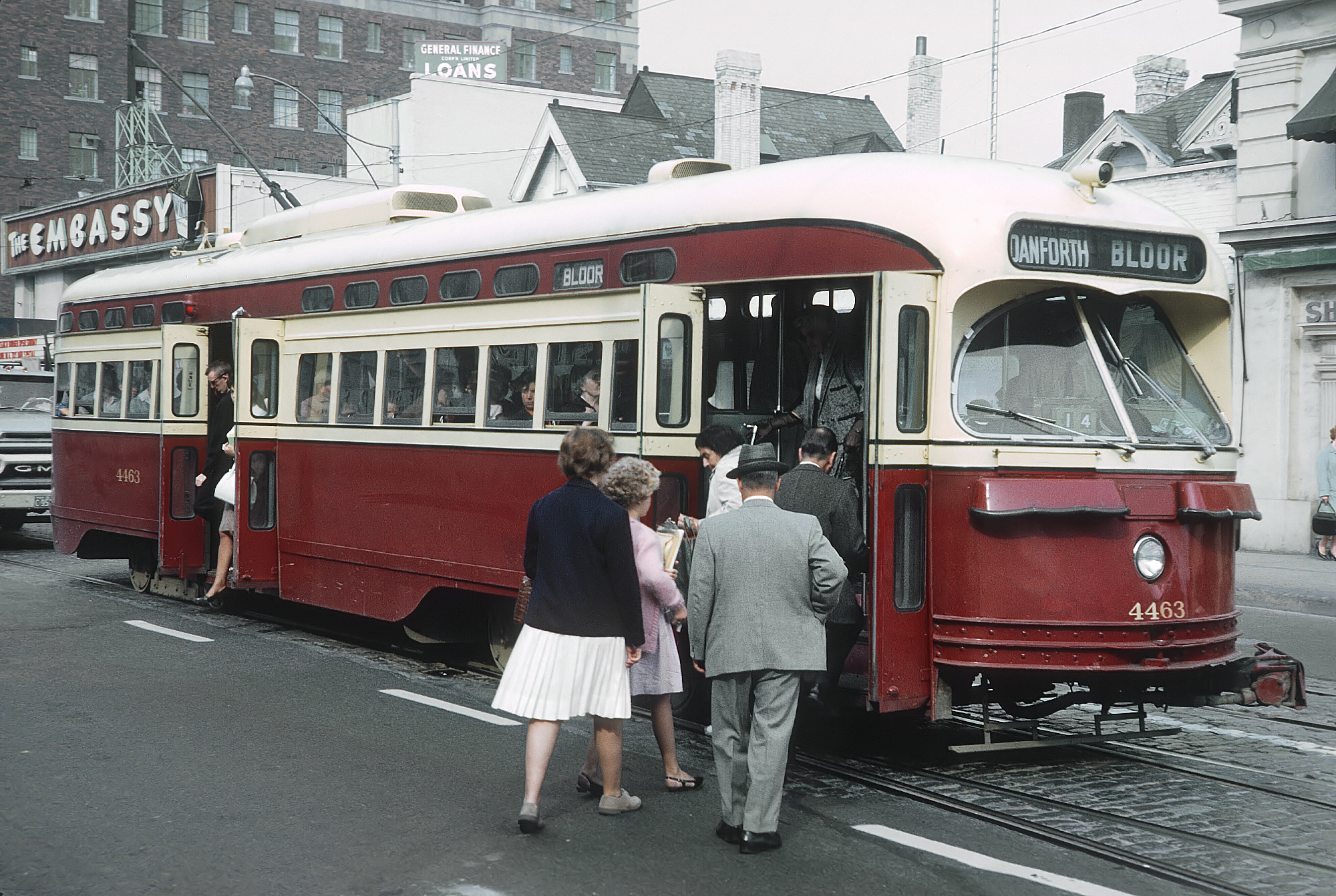
DANFORTH BLOOR car on Bloor near Bay Street in 1965

The Toronto Transit Commission operated the Bloor streetcar line along Bloor Street and Danforth Avenue, extending at its longest from Jane Street (Jane Loop) in the west end of the city to Luttrell Avenue (Luttrell Loop) in the east. Both Luttrell and Jane loops at the termini were transfer points between streetcars and suburban bus routes. The line was discontinued in 1966 with the opening of the Bloor-Danforth subway line, except for two stubs of the line discontinued in 1968.

== Pre-TTC (1890–1921) ==
In 1890, the privately owned Toronto Street Railway started a horsecar service on Bloor Street between Sherbourne and Bathurst Streets. In 1891, the Toronto Railway Company (again privately owned) took over the line and extended horsecar service west to Dufferin Street. In 1893, the TRC replaced the horsecars on the route with electric streetcars. In 1894, the Bloor route was further extended west to Lansdowne Avenue.

The City-owned Toronto Civic Railways opened its Danforth route from Broadview Avenue to Luttrell Avenue in the east in 1913. Passengers could connect with TRC streetcars running south on Broadview Avenue. In the west end of the city, the TCR opened its own Bloor route from Dundas Street West to Quebec Avenue in 1915, and to Runnymede Road in 1917. Passengers could connect with TRC streetcars running on Dundas Street West.

In 1918, the Prince Edward viaduct over the Don Valley was completed, and the TRC's Bloor route was extended east from Sherbourne Street to Broadview Avenue. Unlike most other TRC streetcar routes, the City of Toronto built and owned this extension but had the TRC operate it. The extension was built on a private right-of-way on the side of the street. Thus, with the completion of the viaduct, the TRC's Bloor route operated from Broadview Avenue in the east to Lansdowne Avenue in the west. There were no streetcar tracks between Lansdowne Avenue to Dundas Street West, and thus no connection between the TRC's Bloor line and the TCR's Bloor line further to the west.

== TTC operations (1921–1966) ==
On September 1, 1921, the Toronto Transportation Commission (today's Toronto Transit Commission) took over the TRC and TCR streetcar systems, and would connect the TRC and TCR lines along Bloor Street and Danforth Avenue.

On October 2, 1921, the TTC temporarily joined the TRC's Broadview line (on Broadview Avenue) to the TCR's Danforth line after completion of Luttrell Loop at Danforth and Luttrell Avenues; Peter Witt streetcars ran over the route. In the west end, the TTC extended the former TCR's Bloor line (renamed to Bloor West by the TTC) from Runnymede Road to Jane Street, opening the new Jane Loop on October 9, 1921.

On July 1, 1923, the TTC created its new Bloor route from Luttrell Loop to Lansdowne Avenue. There were still no streetcar tracks on Bloor Street between Lansdowne Avenue and Dundas Street West. After the completion of two railway underpasses on that section of Bloor Street, the TTC extended the Bloor line west to join with the former TCR Bloor line at Dundas Street West. Starting August 25, 1925, Peter Witt streetcars ran on the Bloor line from Luttrell Loop in the east end to Jane Loop in the west end. Between the two end loops, the line was 16 kilometres (10 mi) long, and was served by Peter Witt trains consisting of a large Peter Witt motor pulling a three-door "Harvey" trailer.

On October 22, 1932, Bloor streetcars started running on new track in the middle of Bloor Street between Sherbourne and Parliament streets replacing side-of-street operation on a private right-of-way.

On October 12, 1938, twelve PCC streetcars were introduced on the Bloor line replacing twelve trailers. By November 5, all trailers had been replaced by PCCs. By December 1, PCCs provided all Bloor line service.

On July 4, 1947, High Park Loop opened on the south side of Bloor Street at High Park Avenue. It was built to provide an off-street terminal for picnic charters to High Park.

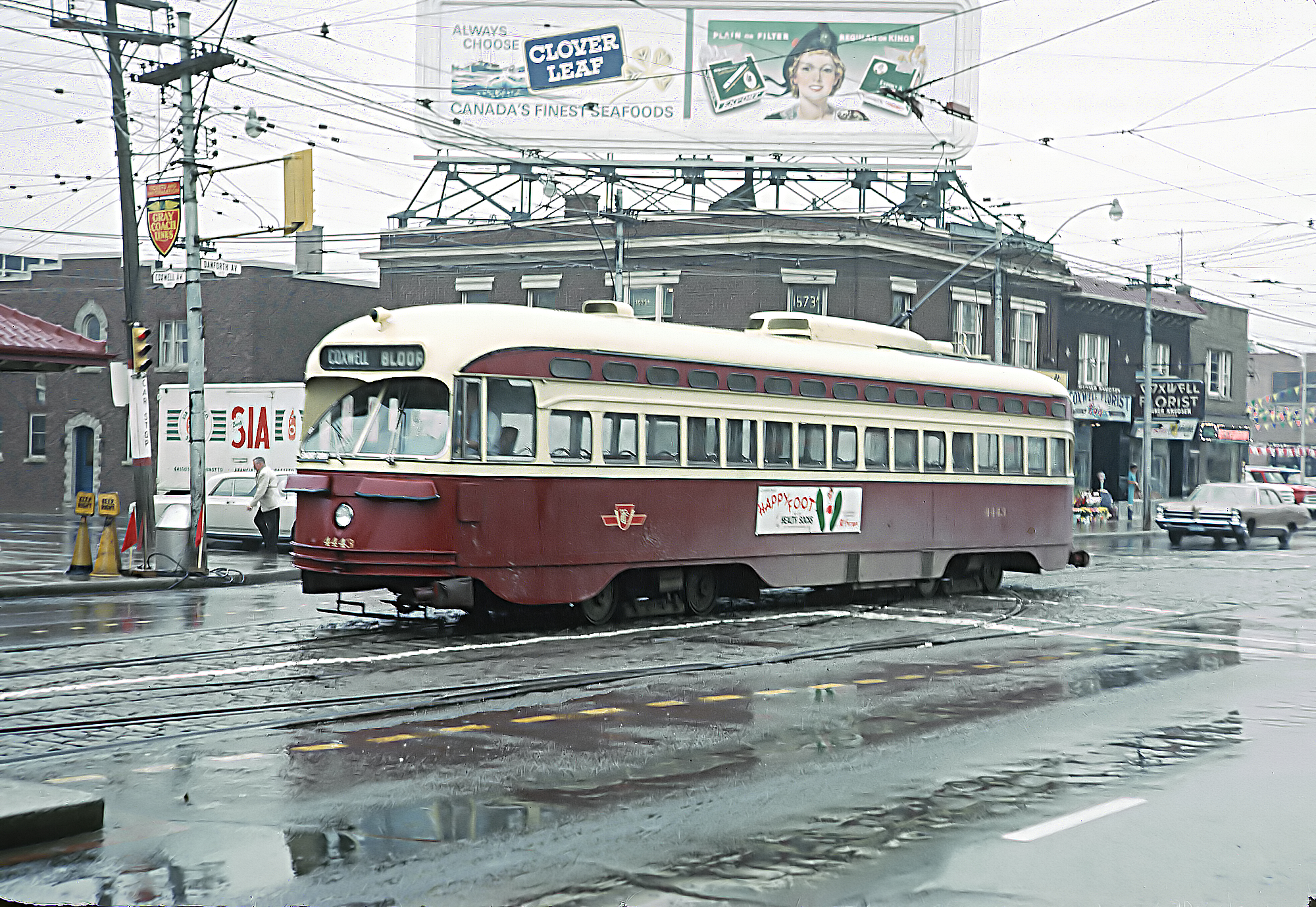
COXWELL BLOOR car at Danforth and Coxwell Avenues heading to Coxwell Carhouse in 1965

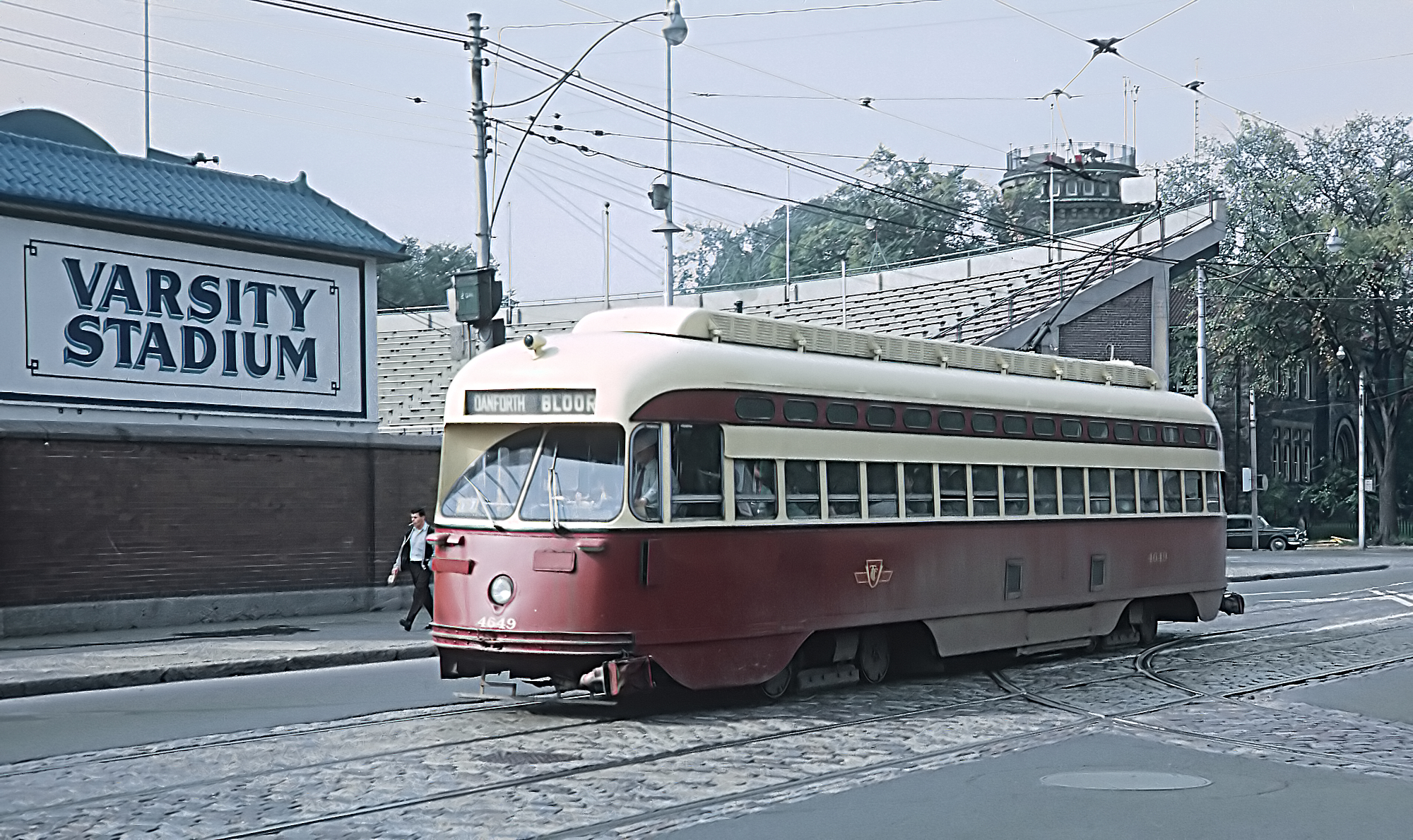
Eastbound DANFORTH BLOOR streetcar (A11 class) at Bloor Street and Bedford Road in 1965

On August 24, 1949, four new A7-class (4400-series) PCCs with multiple-unit capability went into service during the rush hours but running as single units. On August 30, the TTC had a one-day test run of PCCs 4408 and 4409 running as an MU-train. However, there was a delay in further use of MU trains in order to resolve concerns from the union about operating MU trains. On February 9, 1950, the TTC opened the Hillington Loop at Danforth Carhouse at the corner of Danforth and Hillington avenues. This provided an off-street location to couple and uncouple PCC trains, which would go into service the following month.

March 13, 1950, two-car, multiple-unit PCC trains started running during the rush hours. The first trains used pairs of A7-class PCCs of the 4400-series.

On September 12, 1953, the TTC opened the Bedford Loop that circled a building located at the north-west corner of Bloor Street and Bedford Road. Besides becoming the western terminal of the Danforth tripper in 1954, Bedford Loop was available to store streetcars to handle crowds from Varsity Stadium across the street.

On March 30, 1954, the TTC opened the Yonge subway to replace its busiest route, the north–south Yonge streetcar line. The new Bloor subway station had stairs allowing riders to walk up to a pair of platforms in the middle of Bloor Street, where they could board eastbound or westbound Bloor streetcars.

Also on March 30, 1954, the Danforth tripper was rerouted to run between Hillington Loop (stop: Coxwell Avenue) and Bedford Loop using MU trains. Until the Yonge subway opened, this tripper route had run downtown from Luttrell Loop.

=== Routes ===
Besides the Bloor route, other routes shared portions of the Bloor streetcar line.

From July 1, 1923, to July 13, 1951, the King streetcar route (today 504 King) provided rush-hour service along Bloor Street West between Dundas Street West and Jane Loop. The TTC ended this service due to declining ridership. Starting July 16, 1951, all King service turned back at Vincent Loop (until 1966 located opposite today's Dundas West station).

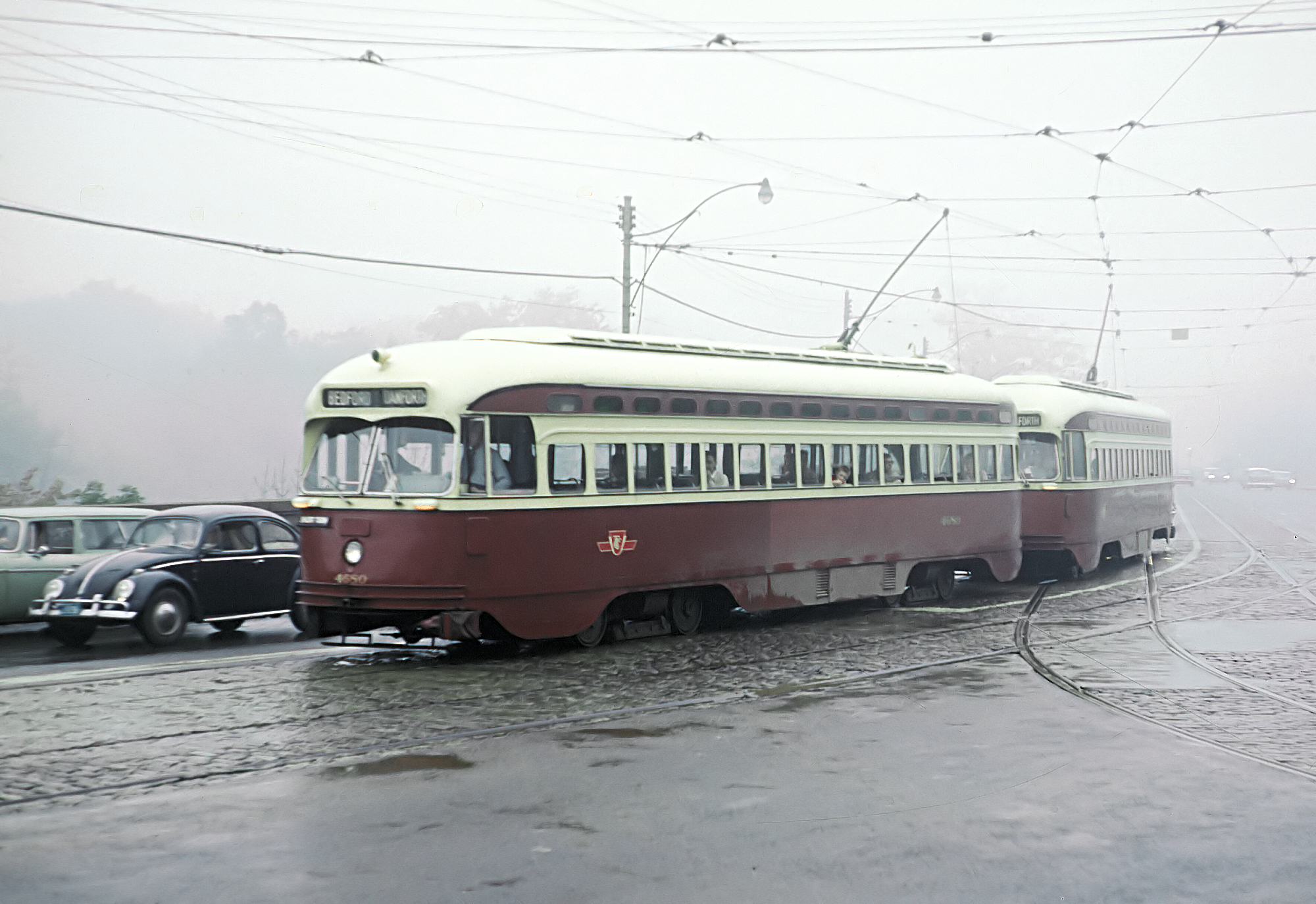
Westbound BEDFORD DANFORTH (Danforth tripper) MU-train of two A12-class PCCs at Bloor and Parliament Streets in 1965

From July 8, 1923, to 1954, the Danforth tripper ran from Luttrell Loop along Danforth Avenue and south on Church Street to loop downtown. After the opening of the Yonge subway on March 30, 1954, the tripper ran from Hillington Loop (stop: Coxwell Avenue) to Bedford Loop at Bedford Road. The Danforth tripper was a rush-hour service.

From December 8, 1945, until the Bloor–Danforth subway opened, the Harbord streetcar route was changed to run along Bloor Street West between Ossington Avenue and Dovercourt Road.

Starting July 1, 1923, the Carlton streetcar (today 506 Carlton) ran along Danforth Avenue between Main Street and its terminal at Luttrell Loop. Then on May 15, 1955, the Carlton streetcar started to use its own loop on Main Street just north of Danforth Avenue in order to relieve streetcar congestion at Luttrell Loop. However, between April 25 and June 13, 1966, the Carlton streetcar temporarily returned to Luttrell Loop during the construction of Main Street subway station and the station's streetcar loop.

=== Multiple-unit operation ===
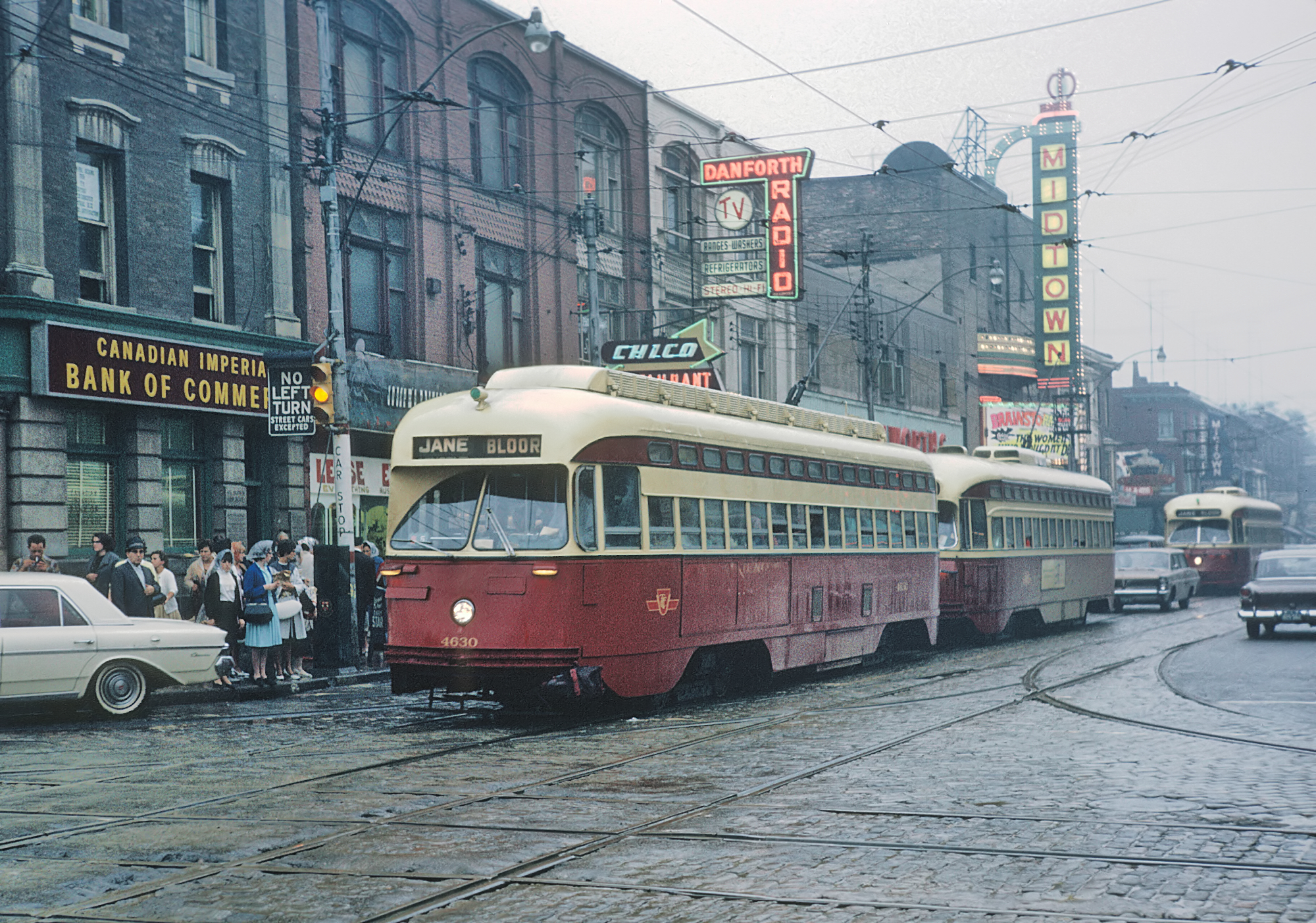
MU-train with a class A11 (former Cleveland) & A7 car on the Bloor route at Bathurst Street in 1965

A characteristic of the Bloor streetcar line was the use of multiple-unit (MU) PCCs running as two-car trains. By 1949, traffic congestion was making it difficult for streetcar service to stay on schedule using less than 2-minute headways. The idea was that a coupled pair of streetcars could go through an intersection faster than two single streetcars. With trains, two cars at a time could approach an intersection, stop for passengers and then proceed together through the intersection.

Only 175 of the TTC's PCC fleet could be run in trains. In 1949, the TTC had received 100 new MU PCCs (designated class A7) from Canadian Car and Foundry in Fort William using shells made by the St. Louis Car Company. Later in 1952, the TTC purchased 75 PCCs second-hand from the Cleveland Transit System. The TTC added couplers to the 50 ex-CTS cars built by Pullman-Standard (class A11), which were already wired for MU operation. However, the remaining 25 ex-CTS cars (class A12, built by the St. Louis Car Company) were not so wired, and the TTC had to wire them from scratch for MU operation in addition to adding couplers.

MU operation required special adjustment to the overhead to handle the two raised trolley poles on each train. To operate an electric switch at an intersection, the overhead wire at had an NA contact and a lock contact before the switch, and an unlock contact after it. The streetcar operator sent a signal from the console to the NA contact to choose a switch direction different from the default direction (usually straight ahead) and trip the lock contact. The unlock contact automatically resets the switch back to the typical or default direction. The locking and unlocking contacts had to be spaced further apart for trains to avoid derailing the second car at the switch. Only switches on the Bloor line could handle MU-trains; if a diversion was required, the cars had to be uncoupled.

A PCC train required an operator in each of the two cars to separately control the doors on each car. Only the operator of the first car drove the train.

== Demise (1966–1968) ==
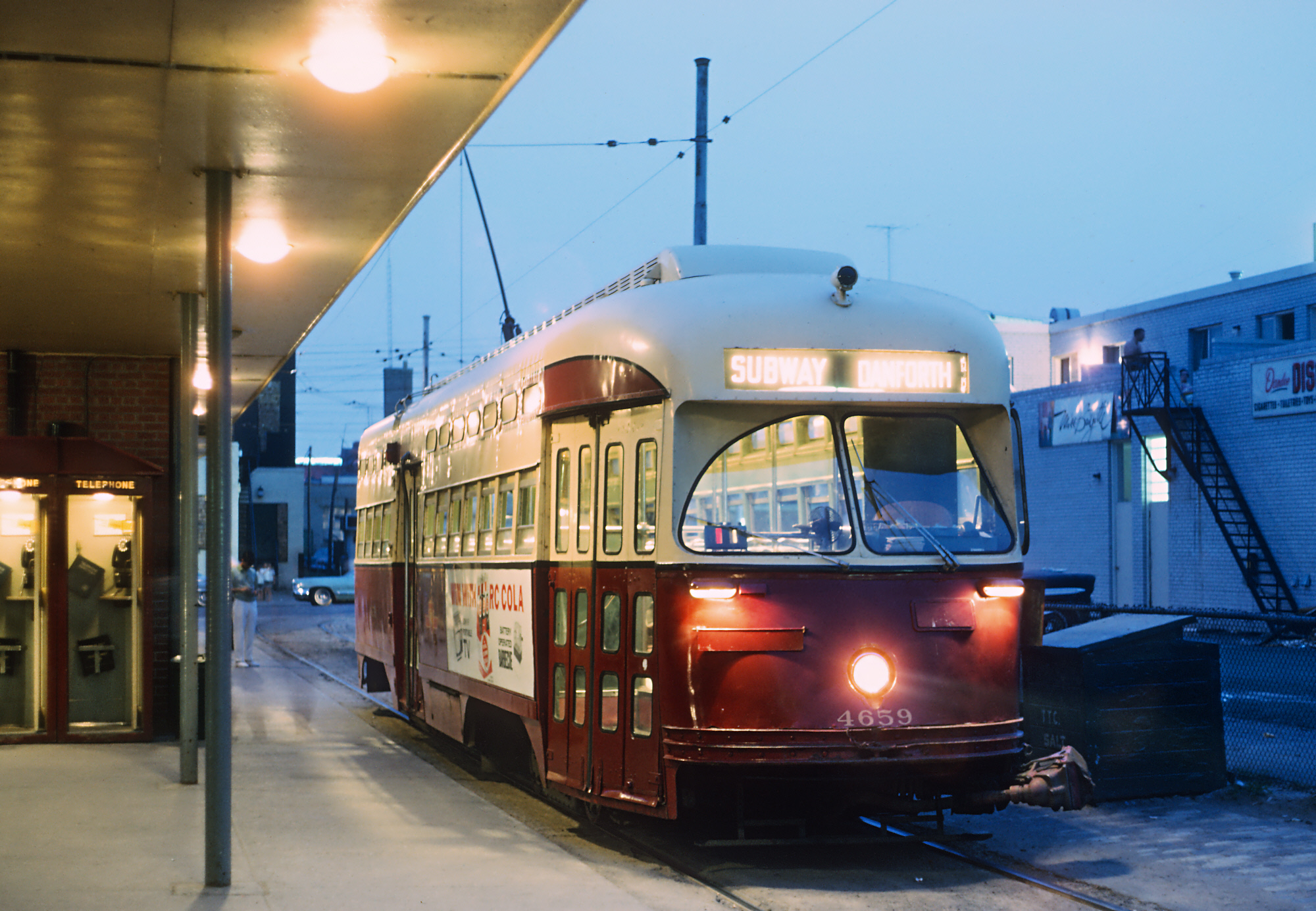
An A11-class PCC on the Danforth shuttle at Luttrell Loop in 1966

On February 26, 1966, the Bloor-Danforth subway opened, replacing the Bloor streetcar line. In addition to the Bloor and Danforth tripper streetcar routes, the Harbord, Coxwell and Parliament streetcar routes were also abandoned at the same time, and the Fort streetcar route was replaced by a shorter Bathurst route.

However, two temporary streetcar routes were created: the Bloor and Danforth shuttles. By 1966, new streetcar loops had been added at the new Woodbine and Keele subway stations. The Danforth shuttle ran between Woodbine station and Luttrell Loop, and the Bloor shuttle, between Keele station and Jane Loop. On May 11, 1968, the Bloor-Danforth subway was extended east to Warden station and west to Islington station. With these two subway extensions, the Bloor and Danforth shuttle streetcar routes were abandoned, thus fully ending the Bloor streetcar line.
