= Keele station =

Toronto subway station

Keele
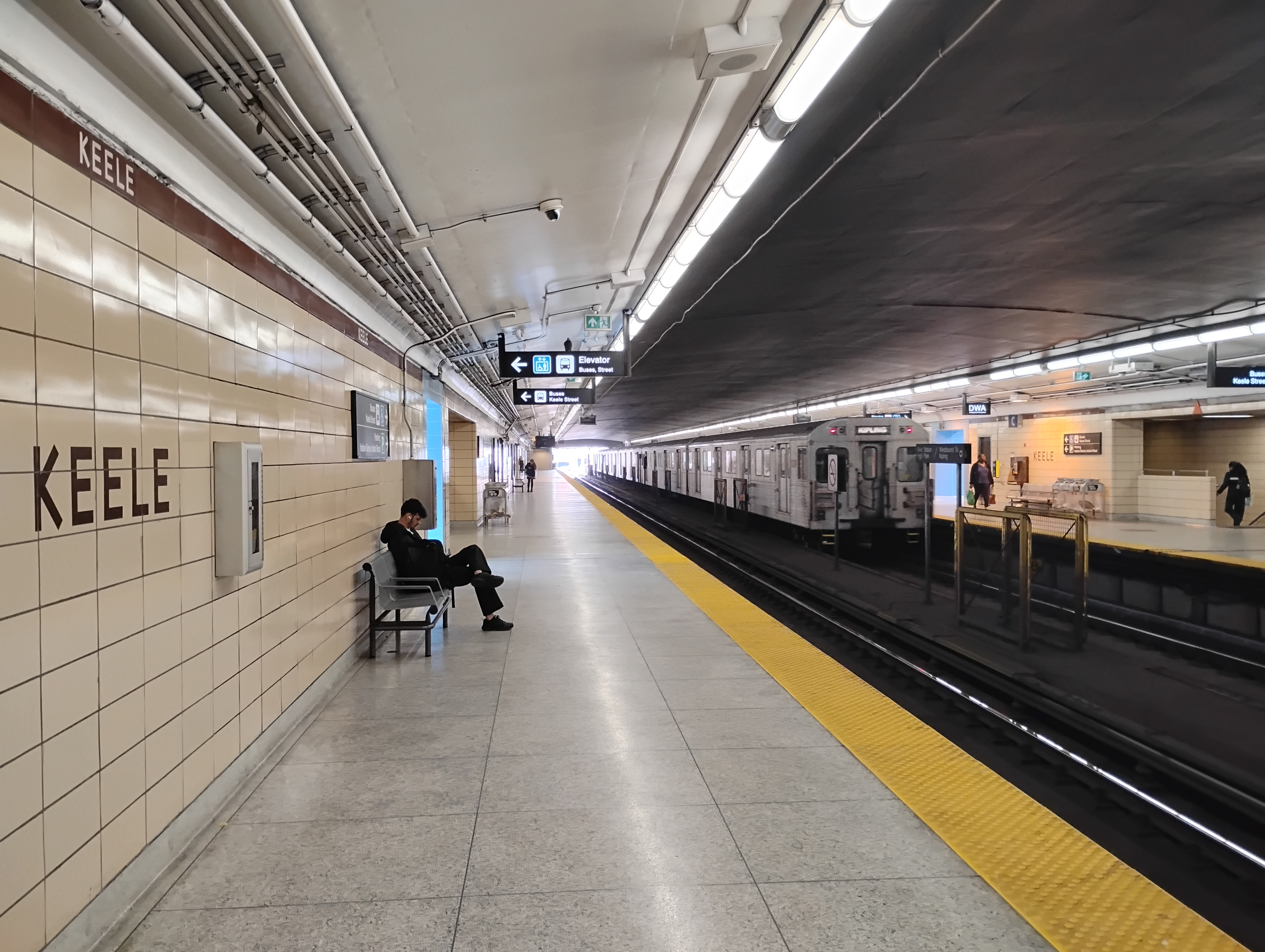
- Keele station platform

General information
- Location: 21 Keele Street; Toronto, Ontario; Canada
- Coordinates: 43°39′20″N 79°27′34″W
- Platforms: Side platforms
- Tracks: 2
- Connections: TTC buses: 41 Keele; 80 Queensway; 89 Weston; 189 Stockyards; 300 Bloor–Danforth; 341 Keele; 941 Keele Express; 989 Weston Express

Construction
- Structure type: Underground/elevated
- Parking: 187 spaces
- Accessible: Yes

Other information
- Website: Official station page

History
- Opened: February 26, 1966; 60 years ago

Passengers
- 2023–2024: 16,305
- Rank: 46 of 70

Services
Preceding station	Toronto Transit Commission	Following station
High Park towards Kipling	Line 2 Bloor–Danforth	Dundas West towards Kennedy
Track layout
Location

Keele is a Toronto subway station on Line 2 Bloor–Danforth in Toronto, Ontario, Canada. It is located just north of Bloor Street West on the east side of Keele Street. The station opened in 1966 and was the western terminus of the line until 1968.

== History ==
When the Bloor–Danforth line was opened in 1966 from Keele to Woodbine station, the Bloor streetcar line was dramatically shortened. It now traveled east from Jane Loop only as far as Keele station; at the eastern end of the line, a separate Danforth streetcar was established, from Woodbine station to Luttrell Loop.

On May 11, 1968, the Bloor and Danforth streetcars were both eliminated when the subway extensions west to Islington and east to Warden were opened. During this initial two-year period, the trolley buses and streetcars serving the station used separate loops (both within the fare-paid area), one near each of the station's entrances, so that passengers transferring between streetcars and trolleybuses had to walk along the subway platform. While the main (Keele Street) entrance and trolleybus loop had escalators up to the platform, the east (parking lot and Indian Grove) entrance and streetcar loop were provided with a moving ramp leading up to what is now the eastbound subway platform. After streetcar service to the station ended in 1968, the streetcar loop property was redeveloped and the moving ramp was sealed off. The former trolleybus loop is still used, by buses.

Installation of two elevators to make the station fully accessible commenced in August 2019. The construction was completed in July 2021, with Keele becoming the TTC's 53rd accessible station.

== Subway infrastructure in the vicinity ==
Just east of Keele Street, the line emerges from a hillside, changing directly from tunnel to an elevated alignment on an enclosed bridge, then enters the station. The fully enclosed station crosses over both Keele Street and a parallel side street named Indian Grove. Just east of the station the line emerges onto an open viaduct, with a 187 space parking lot located underneath at 400 Indian Road. The line then continues at ground level beside Keele Yard (formerly called Vincent Yard), before descending into the Dorval Portal as it continues to Dundas West station.

== Nearby landmarks ==
Nearby landmarks include High Park and Keele Junior Public School. The neighbourhood of The Junction is located north of the station.

== Surface connections ==
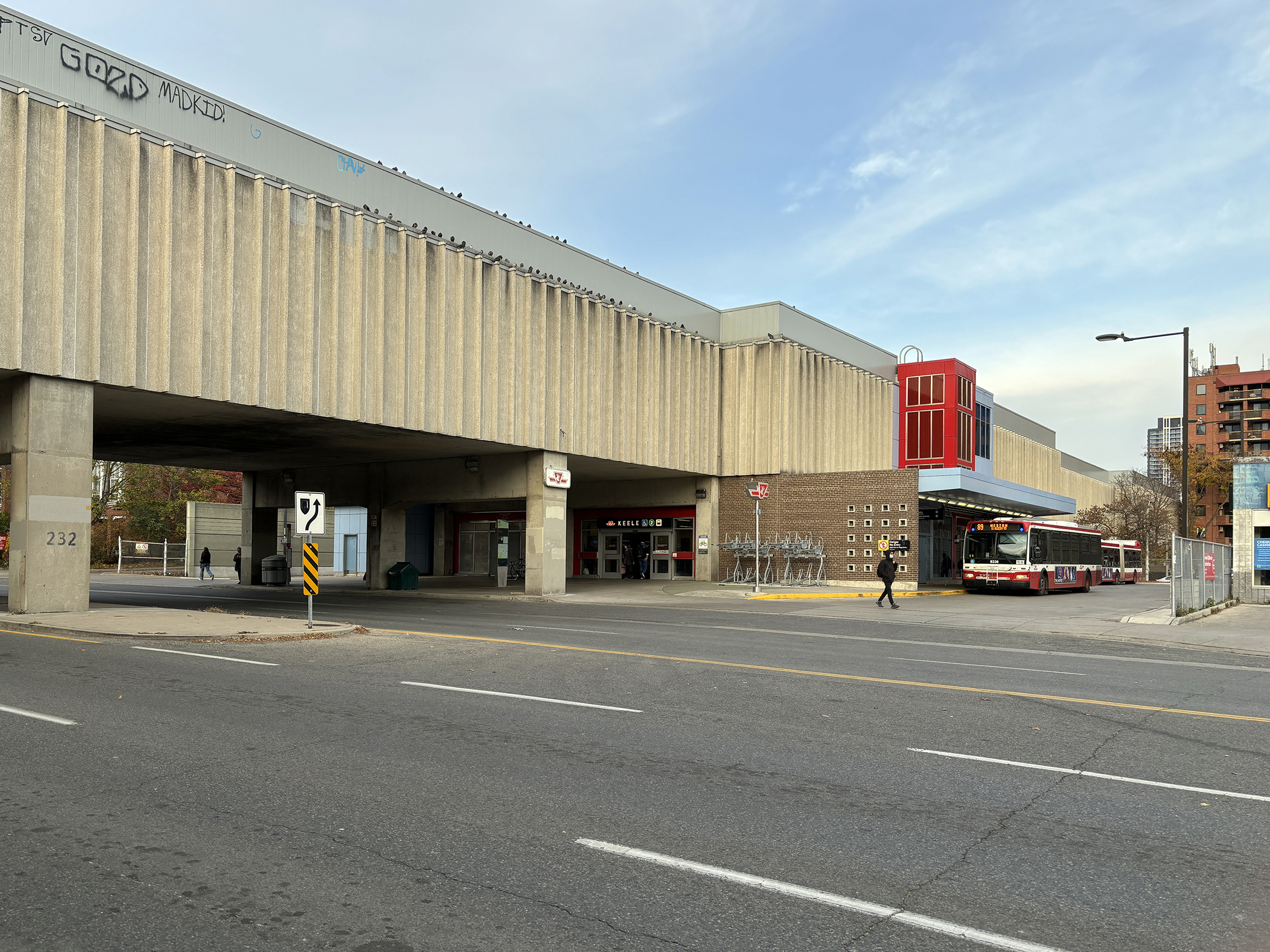
Exterior of the station

TTC routes serving the station include:

Route	Name	Additional information
41	Keele	Northbound to Pioneer Village station via Keelesdale station
80	Queensway	Westbound to Sherway Gardens
89	Weston	Northbound to Albion Road via Mount Dennis station
189	Stockyards	Northbound to Scarlett Road and southbound to High Park station (On-street stop outside station)
941	Keele Express	Northbound to Finch West station via Keelesdale station (Rush hour service)
989	Weston Express	Northbound to Steeles Avenue West via Mount Dennis station (Rush hour service)
341	Keele	Blue Night service; northbound to York University
