= High Park station =

Toronto subway station

High Park
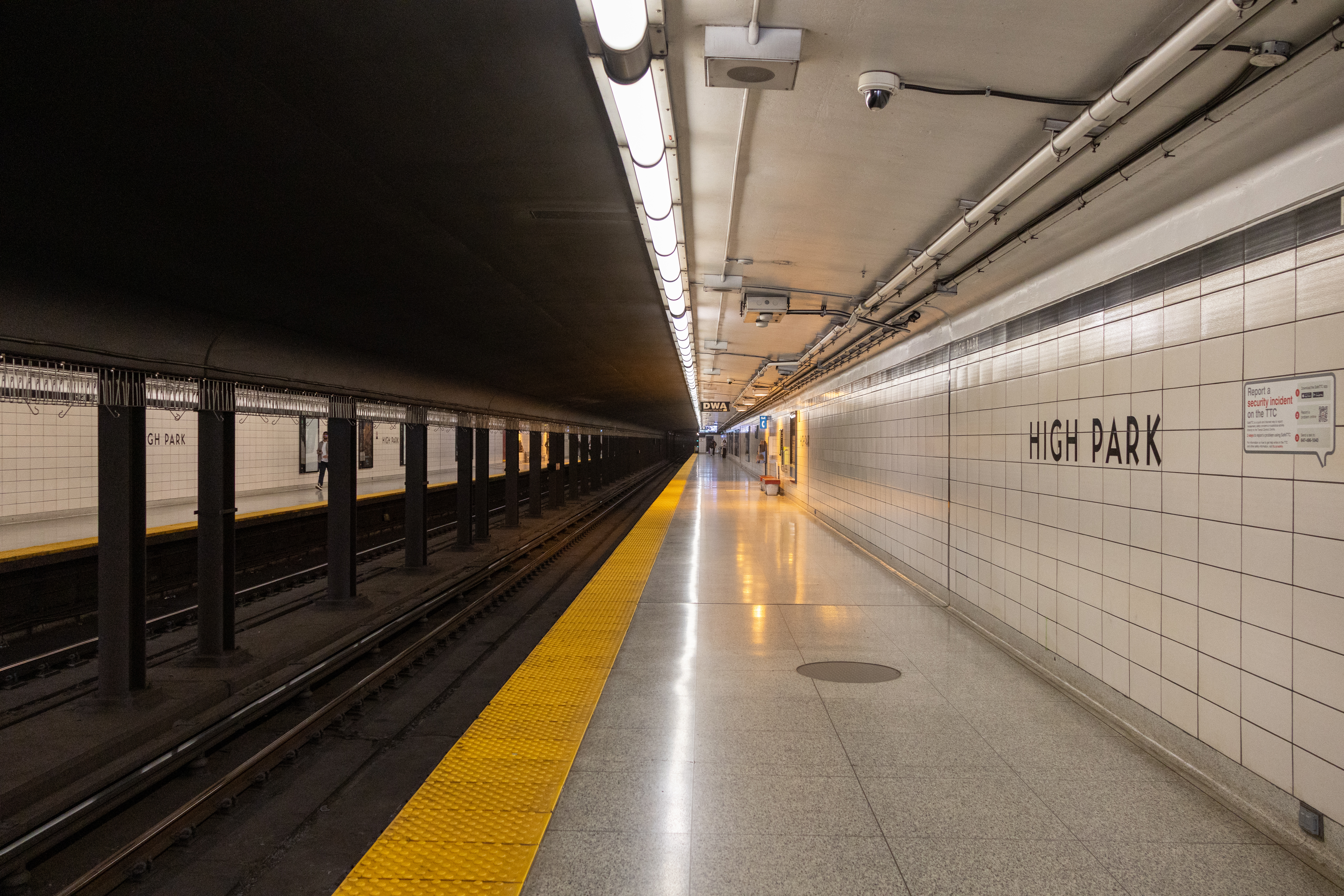

General information
- Location: 35 Quebec Avenue; Toronto, Ontario; Canada
- Coordinates: 43°39′14″N 79°28′01″W
- Platforms: Side platforms
- Tracks: 2
- Connections: TTC buses: 30 High Park North; 189 Stockyards; 300 Bloor - Danforth

Construction
- Structure type: Underground / at grade
- Accessible: Yes

Other information
- Website: Official station page

History
- Opened: May 10, 1968; 58 years ago

Passengers
- 2023–2024: 9,173
- Rank: 58 of 70

Services
Preceding station	Toronto Transit Commission	Following station
Runnymede towards Kipling	Line 2 Bloor–Danforth	Keele towards Kennedy
Track layout
Location

High Park is a subway station on Line 2 Bloor–Danforth of the Toronto subway in Toronto, Ontario, Canada. It is located just north of Bloor Street West, spanning the block east of Quebec Avenue to High Park Avenue. It opened in 1968 as part of the westerly extension from Keele to Islington station.

== Station description ==
The station is mostly underground, lying behind the properties which face on to the north side of Bloor Street. The main entrance is from Quebec Avenue at the westerly end of the surface bus transfer area, with the ticketing mezzanine one level below, above the east end of the train platforms. The station has escalators here but, despite having ramps at the street entrance, it did not have elevators to provide access to the platforms for those with physical disabilities prior to 2025. A second entrance from High Park Avenue is at the east end of the bus platform, which is convenient for those needing to cross Bloor Street at the traffic lights to get to and from High Park.

The west end is at ground level, with an apartment building constructed partially over the station and along the south side. Just west of the station, Parkview Gardens is divided by the surface subway tracks and there are two entrances; one on the north side leading to Clendenan Avenue and another on the south leading to Bloor Street. Admission and exit at this end of the station is underground through unstaffed turnstiles.

The original external signage and trim has a unique bright blue background colour, whereas standard stations are red. In 2009 the station title nameboard over the entrance on Quebec Avenue was converted to the current style of a black background, white lettering and a stripe of green to signify the Bloor–Danforth line, but the other entrances still retain the old ones.

Rehabilitation of the station has included repairs to the roof slab and repaving. Original deteriorating walls and fences were replaced with sound barriers along the bus transfer area and beyond the west end of the station platforms.

New station entrance (2025–)

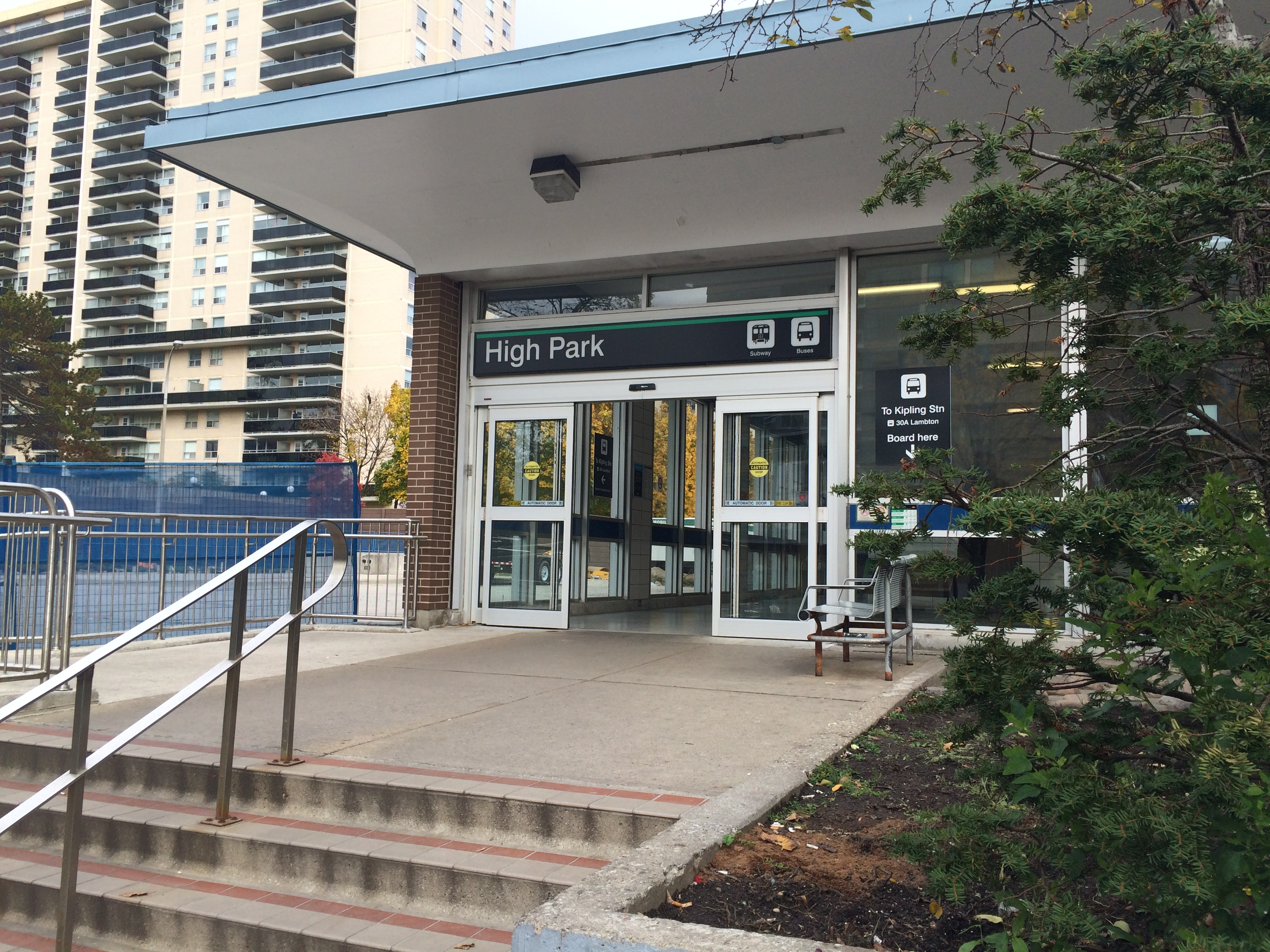
Original station entrance (1968–2022)

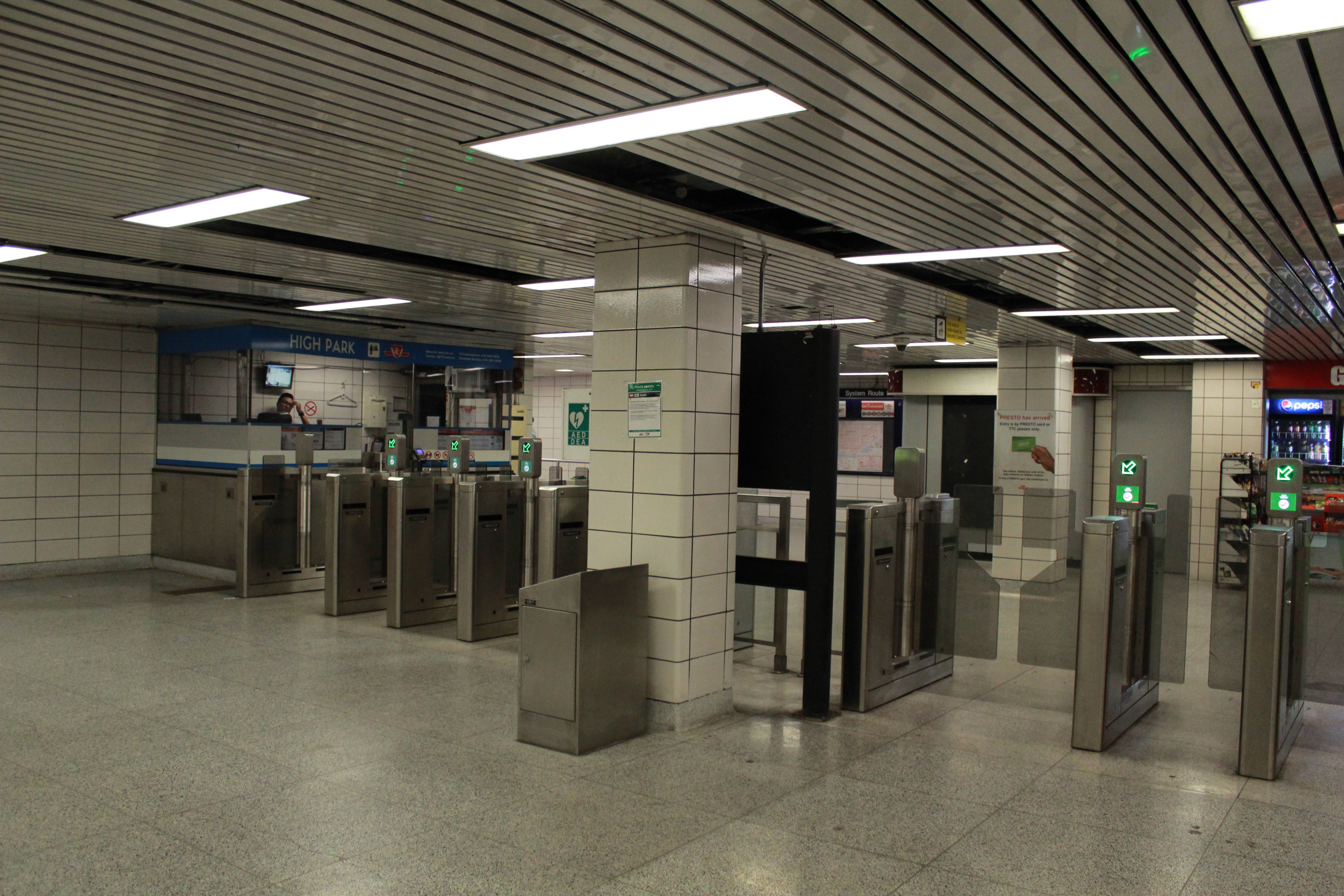
High Park Station concourse

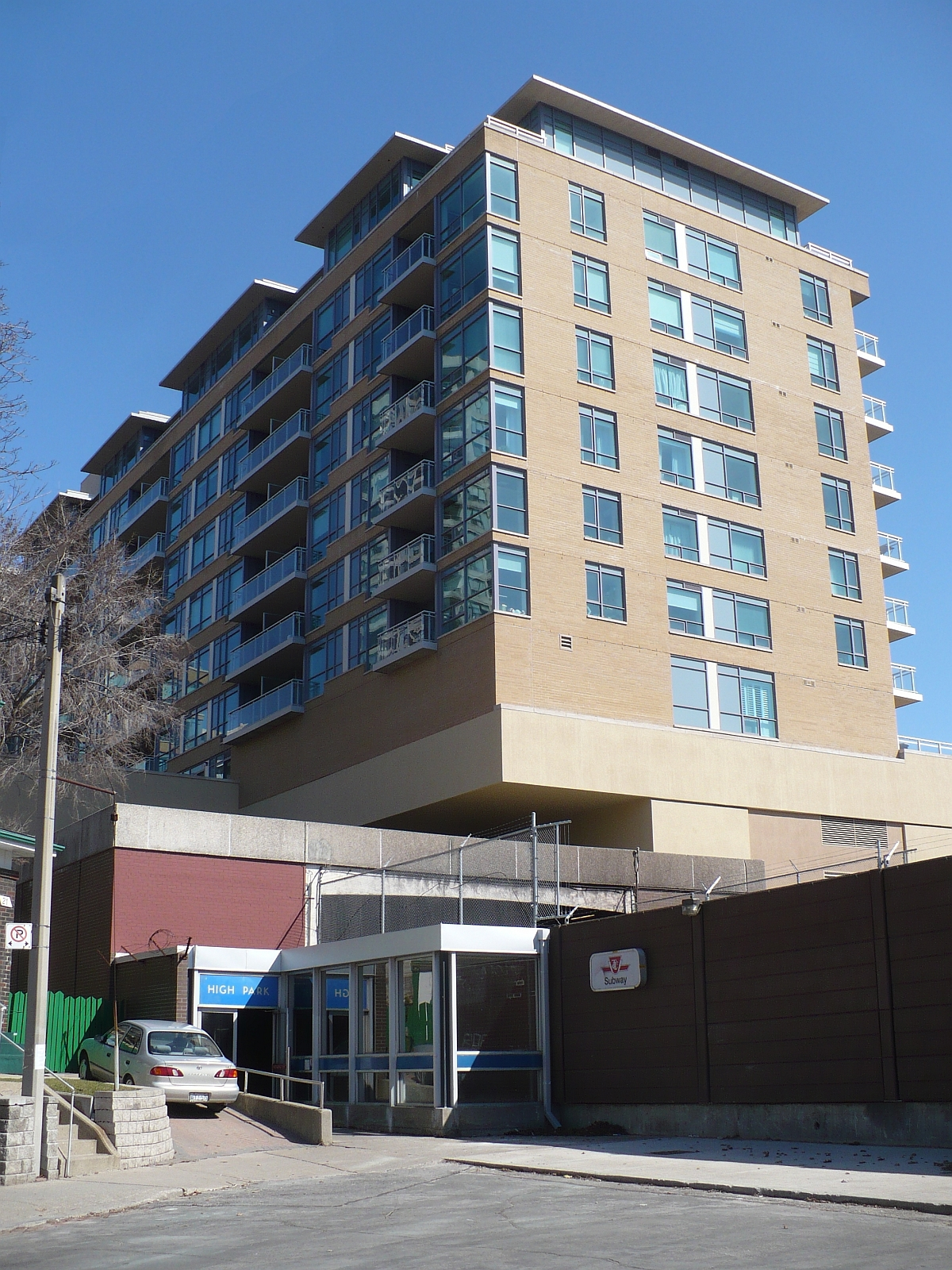
Entrance to the north side of the station from Parkview Gardens. The apartment building is over the west end of the station and the sound barrier extends along the tracks to the west.

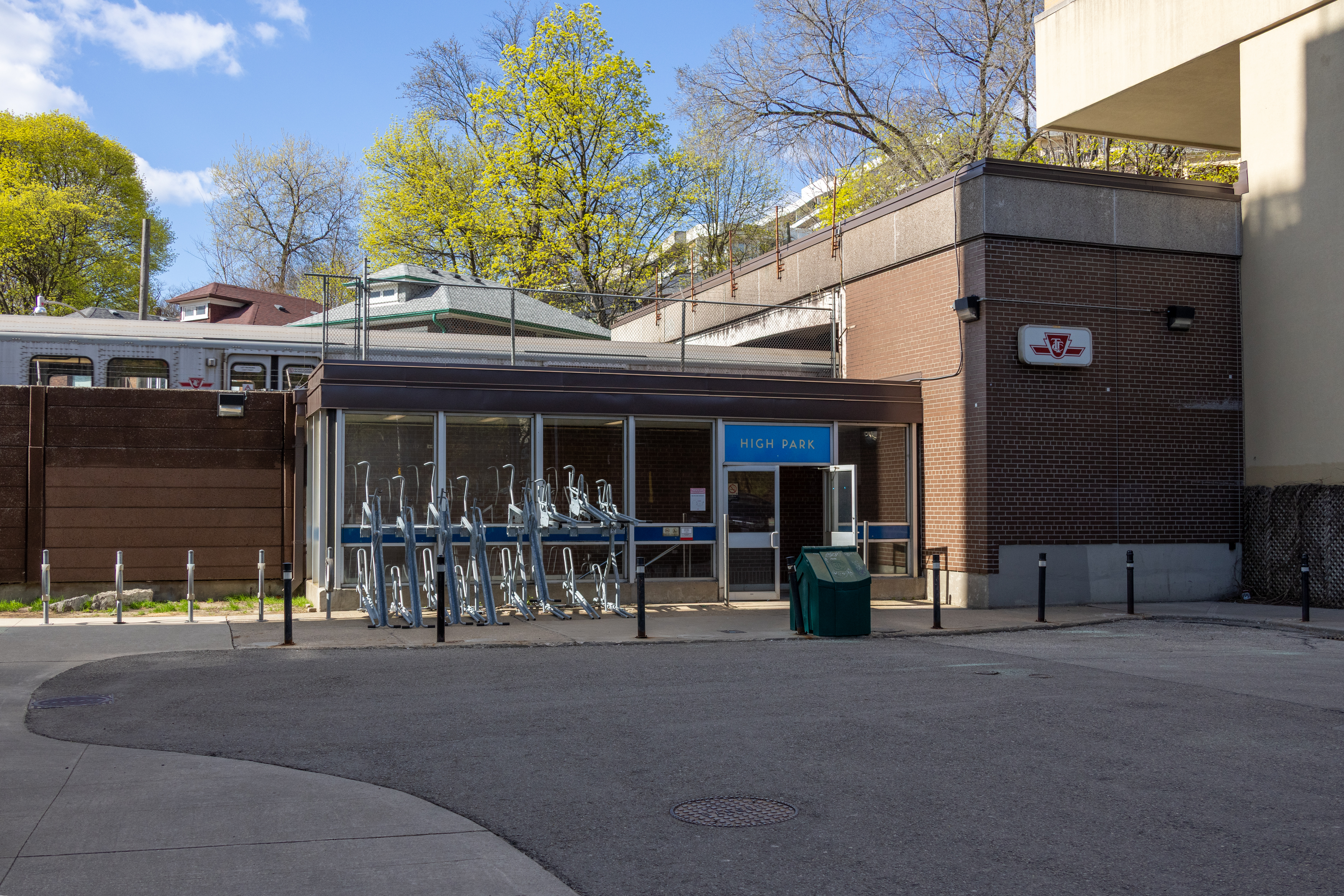
Entrance to the south side of the station from Parkview Gardens

=== Station access upgrades ===
Construction at High Park station began on June 20, 2022, to install two new elevators, improve signage, install security cameras along the accessible pathway, and build a new main entrance structure and automatic sliding doors. The Quebec Avenue entrance was closed for duration of construction. Construction was completed in March 2025.

== Nearby landmarks ==
Nearby landmarks include High Park and Humberside Collegiate Institute. The High Park Mineral Baths was demolished in 1962 to make way for the subway line. It had opened in 1913 as part of a sanatorium but eventually became a public pool.

== Surface connections ==
The station's bus platform is not within the fare-paid area.

TTC routes serving the station include:

Bay number	Route	Name	Additional information
1	30	High Park North	Northbound to Runnymede Road
2	189	Stockyards	Northbound to Scarlett Road
3	203	High Park	Southbound to High Park via West Road; Seasonal service
