= Luttrell Loop =

Former Toronto streetcar terminus

Coordinates: 43°41′22″N 79°17′39″W

A PCC streetcar enters the first Luttrell Loop in 1954. The bus in this image is an intercity bus.

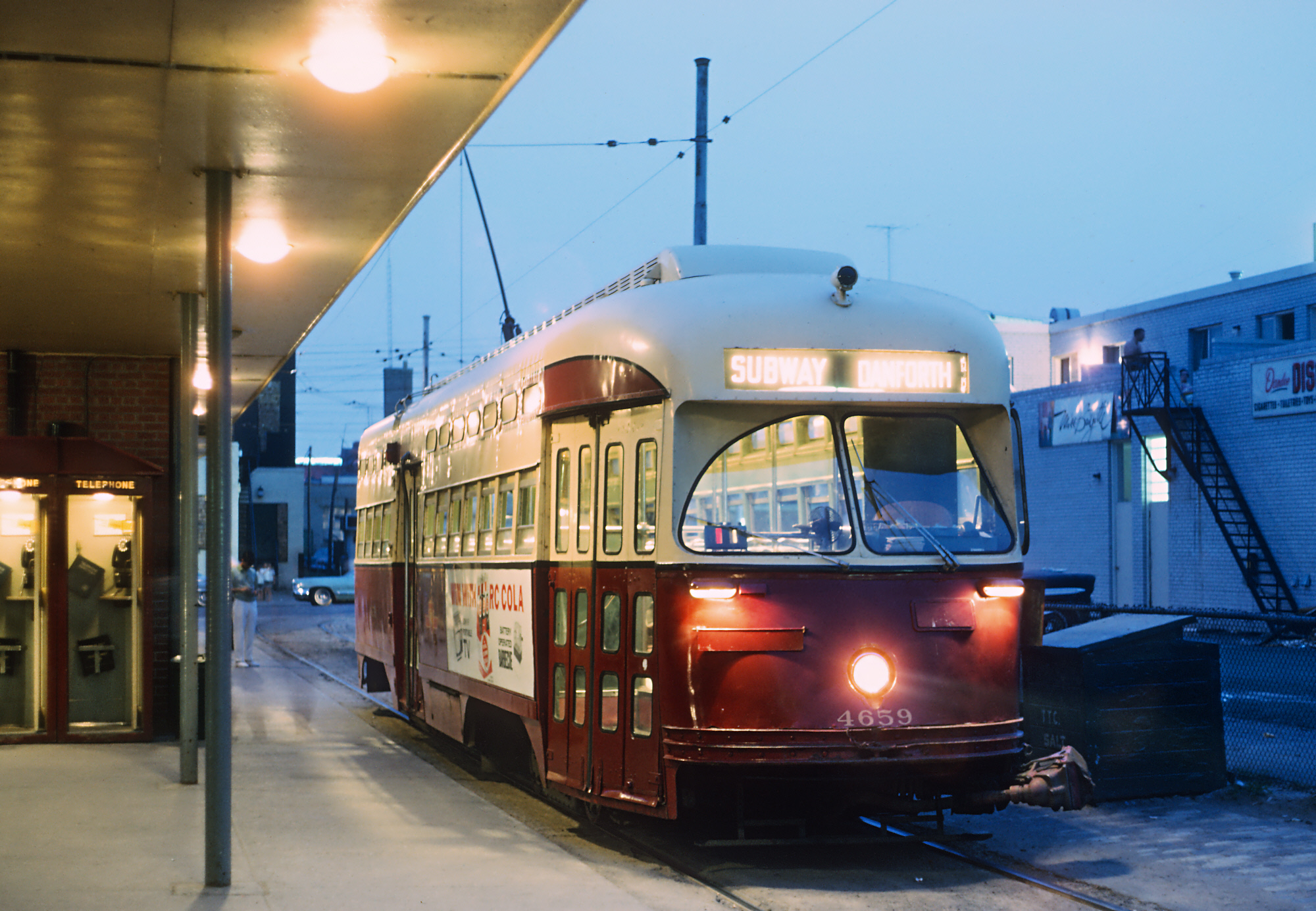
An A11-class PCC waits at the platform of the second Luttrell Loop in 1966.

The Toronto Transit Commission's Luttrell Loop was the eastern terminus of the Bloor streetcar line. The loop was closed in 1968 after completion of an extension of the Bloor–Danforth subway line.

In 1913, the Toronto Civic Railways, owned by the City of Toronto, opened its Danforth streetcar line along Danforth Avenue from Broadview Avenue to Luttrell Avenue. The TCR used double-ended streetcars, so there were crossovers at each end of the line. After the Toronto Transportation Commission took over the TCR in 1921, it constructed the Luttrell Loop to turn single-ended Peter Witt streetcars. In 1923, the Luttrell Loop became the eastern terminal of the Bloor streetcar line running from Jane Loop, its western terminal. In 1966, the Bloor–Danforth subway line replaced the Bloor streetcar line between Woodbine and Keele stations. From then, the Danforth streetcar shuttle started running between Woodbine station and Luttrell Loop until replaced by an extension of the subway line in 1968.

The Luttrell Loop had two arrangements. Until 1955, the loop crossed the south-west corner of Danforth and Luttrell avenues in a counter-clockwise direction. The loop was next door to the garage of Danforth Bus Lines, absorbed by the TTC in 1954. In 1955, a new larger loop opened turning south on Kelvin Avenue, east on a private right-of way (behind the former Danforth Bus Lines garage) where a platform and waiting rooms were available, then north on Luttrell Avenue, and west on Danforth Avenue. Also, in 1955, the Main Loop was built on Main Street just north of Danforth Avenue to eliminate the congestion of having Carlton streetcars looping at the Luttrell Loop. Like the Jane Loop at the other end of the Bloor line, several local and intercity bus routes also terminated at the loop, allowing commuters to transfer between routes.

Luttrell Avenue, an otherwise obscure, tiny dead-end street, was (at the time the loop was in use) the eastern limit of the City of Toronto as it intersected with Danforth Avenue. The borders of the borough of East York dipped down south of the Danforth at this point to encompass the Ford Motor plant (later Shoppers World Danforth), which lay directly to the east of Luttrell.
