= TTC Belt Line tour =

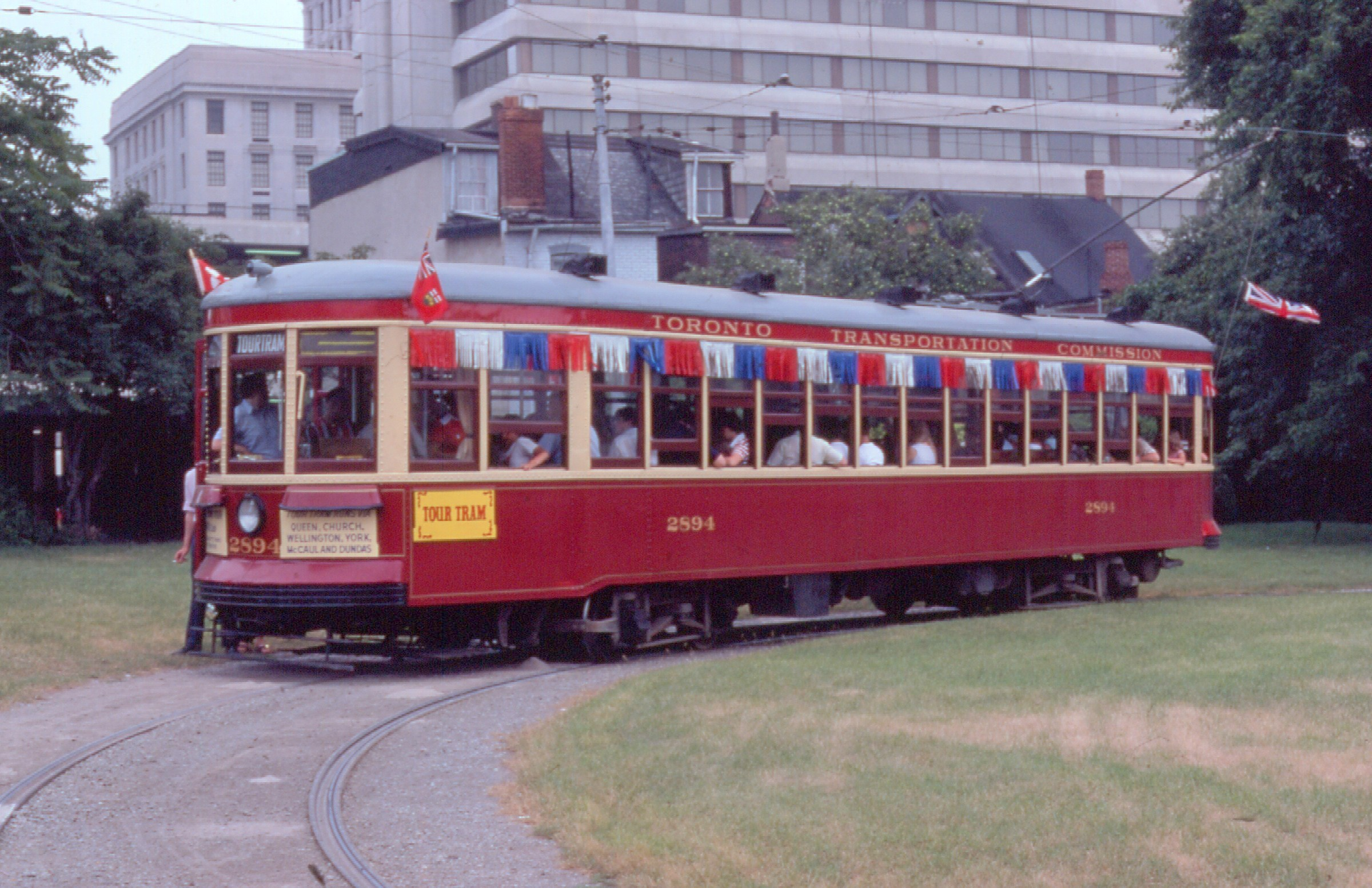
Tour tram car 2894 at McCaul Loop in 1974

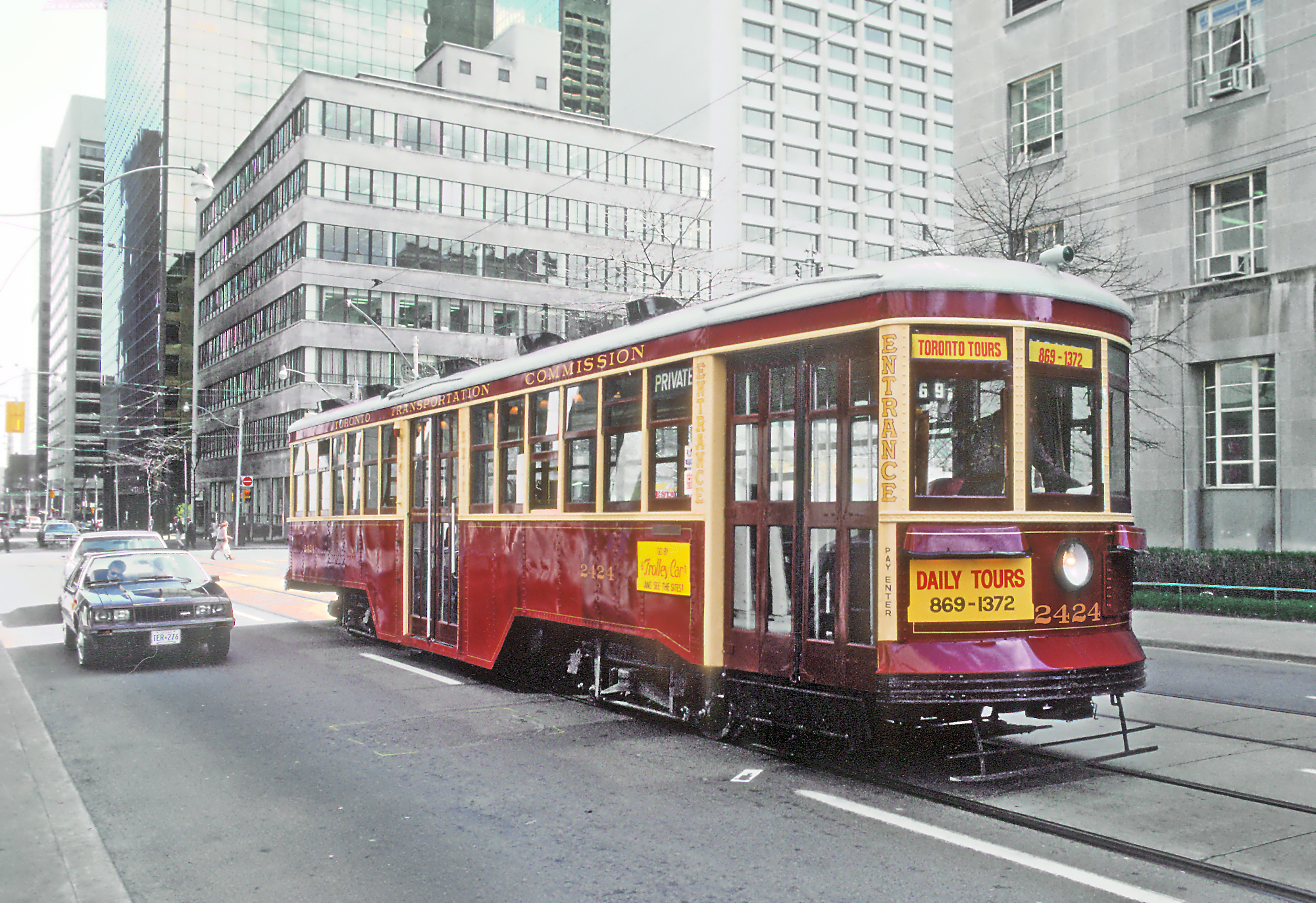
Tour tram car 2424 in 1983

In the 1970s and 1980s, three Toronto Peter Witt cars, specifically 2766, 2424 and 2894, provided tour tram services in downtown Toronto. Car 2766 was owned by the TTC while the other two were owned by the Ontario Electric Railway Historical Association (OERHA) and were on loan to the TTC for special runs on the Toronto streetcar system.

Between 1973 and 1975, the Toronto Transit Commission ran the Belt Line Tour Tram using two Peter Witt streetcars, one in operation with a second in reserve. The name of the route was inspired by the Toronto Railway Company Belt Line, which operated between 1892 and 1923 on a route different from the more modern tour tram. The Belt Line Tour Tram operated out of the McCaul Loop, running clockwise from McCaul Street east on Queen Street, south on Church Street, west on King Street, north on Spadina Avenue and returning east on Queen Street. Riders paid a regular fare, and were issued transfers which would allow them to board other TTC vehicles. The service only ran during the summer. The TTC provided a guide to give passengers historical commentary. The picturesque heritage vehicles were meant to please tourists. The last run of this route occurred on Thankgiving Day, 1975, the service ending due to a lack of ridership.

Between 1983 and 1988, a private company operating as Toronto Tours chartered Peter Witt cars for tours around downtown Toronto along a route different from the former Belt Line Tour Tram. Higher fares were charged. The TTC ended tour tram services due to maintenance difficulties and safety issues with the aging Peter Witt cars. The cars owned by the OERHA were returned to its museum line, the Halton County Radial Railway.
