= Ossington Avenue =

Thoroughfare in Toronto, Ontario

Coordinates: 43.65583°N 79.42325°W

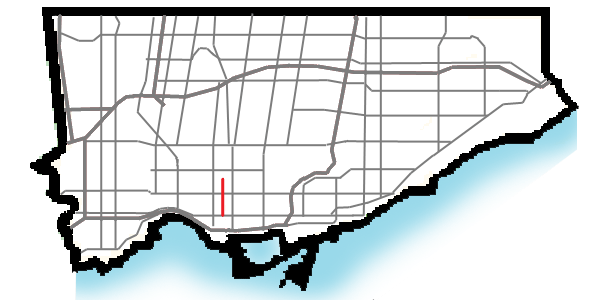
- Interactive map of Ossington Avenue
- Maintained by: City of Toronto government
- Length: 3.5 km (2.2 mi)
- South end: Queen Street
- Major junctions: Dundas Street; Bloor Street; Dupont Street
- North end: Davenport Road

Other
Nearby arterial roads in Toronto
← Dufferin Street	Bathurst Street →

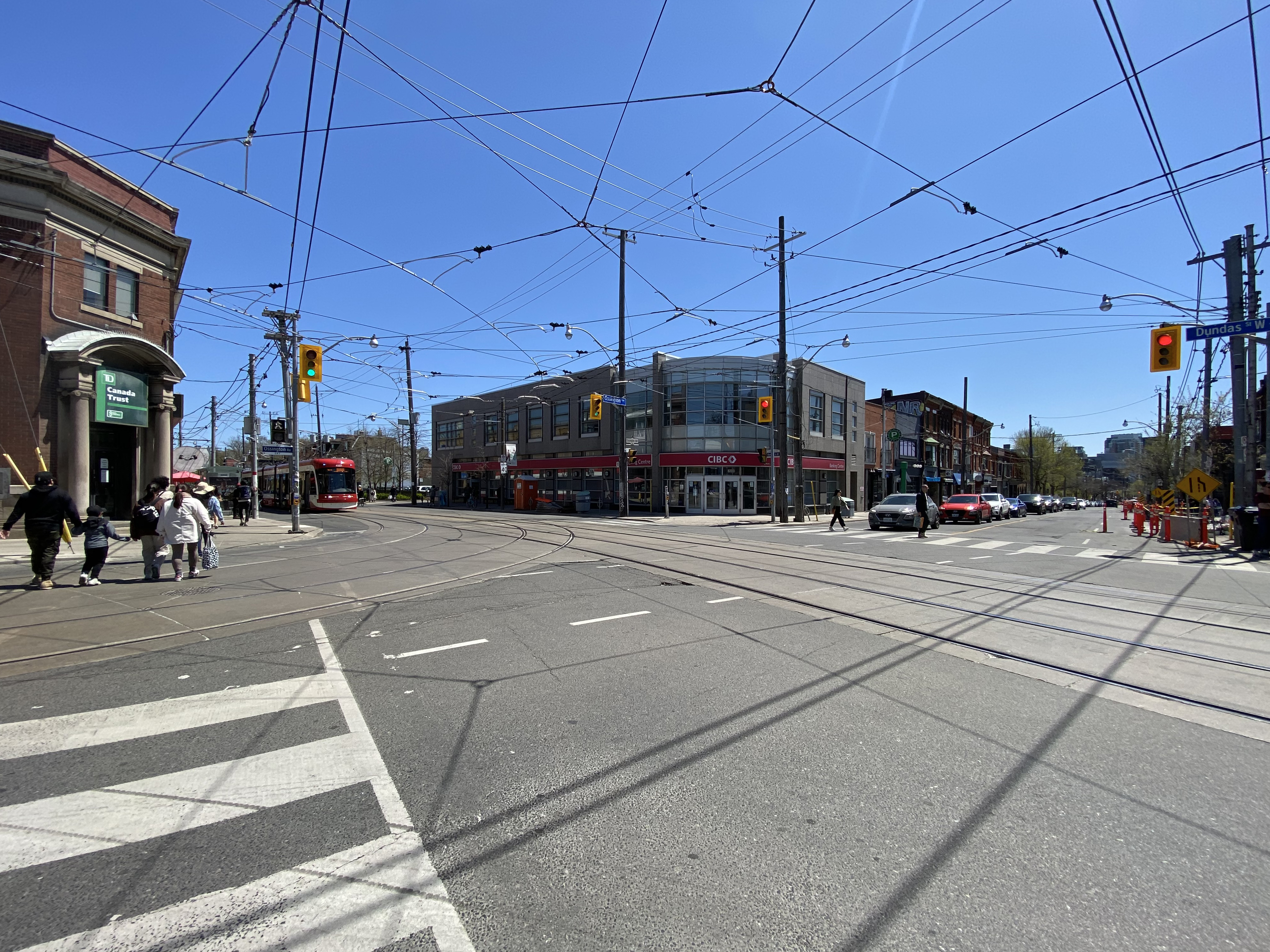
Ossington Ave at Dundas St West in 2022

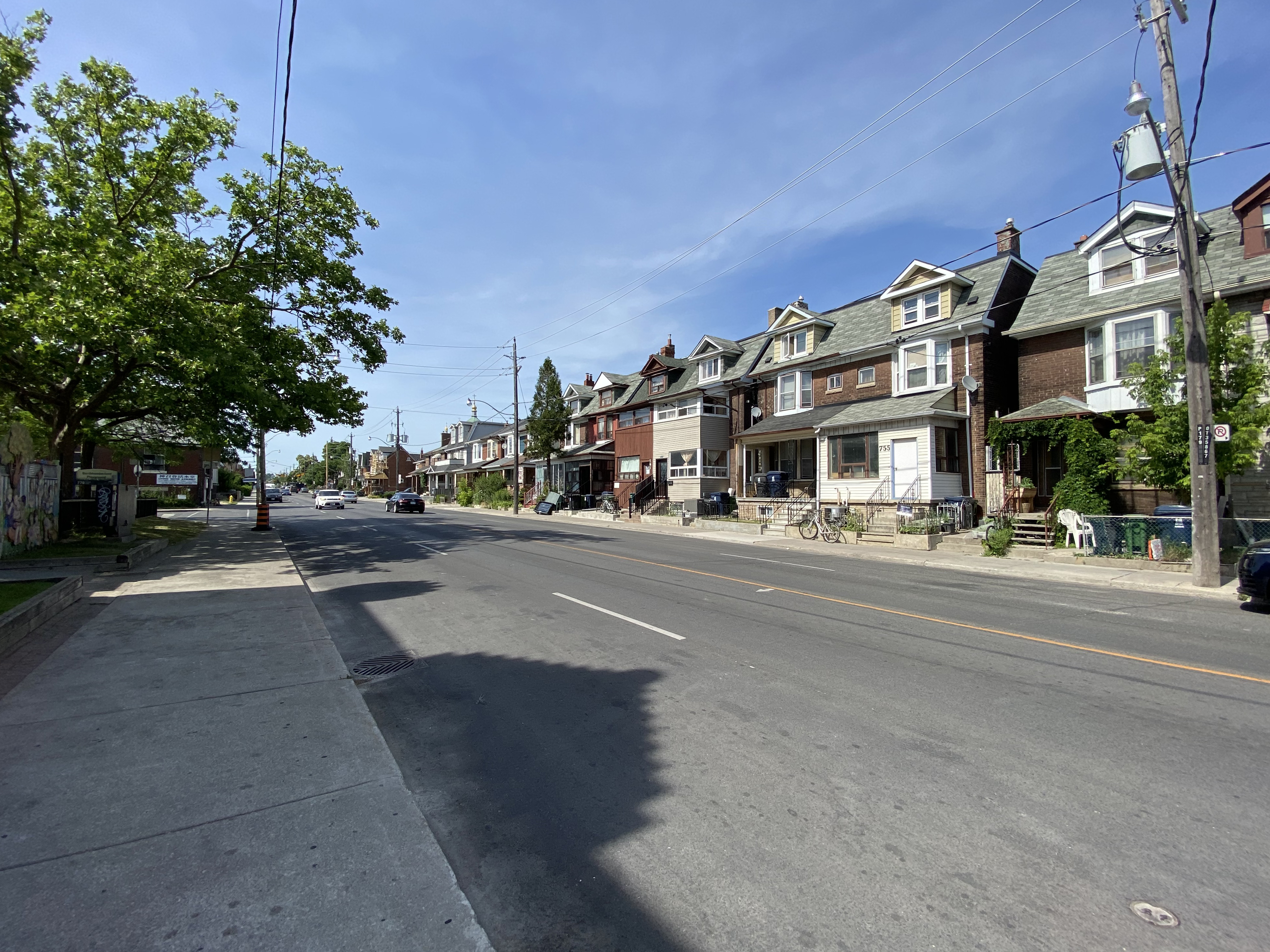
Old house at Ossington Avenue

Ossington Avenue (/ˈɔːzɪŋtən/ AW-zing-tən) is a main or arterial street in Toronto, Ontario, Canada, west of downtown. While the northern 3 kilometres (1.9 mi) of Ossington Avenue is residential, its southern terminus is popularly known as the Ossington Strip, an area popular for its dining, nightlife and shopping establishments.

== History ==
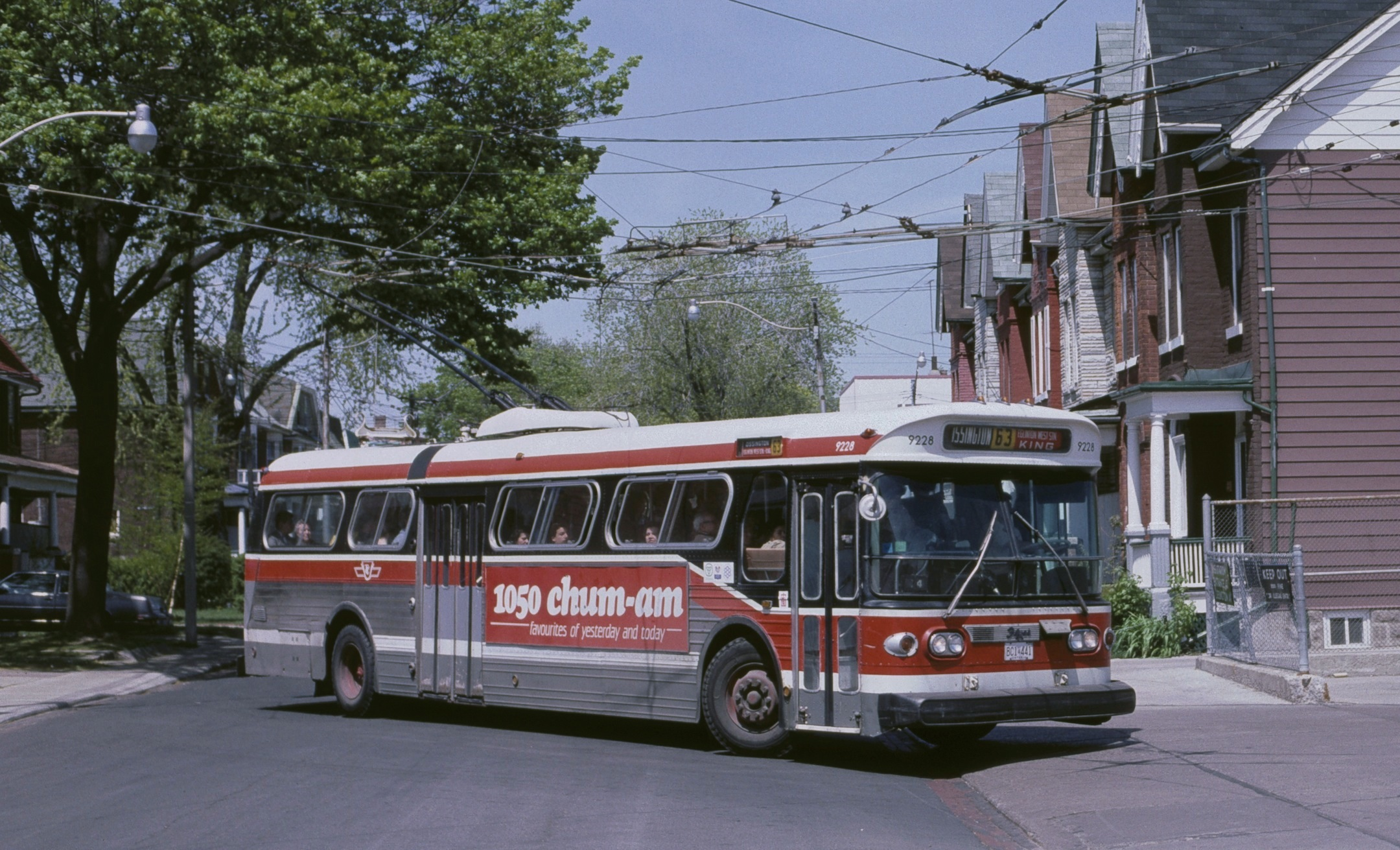
A TTC trolleybus on the Ossington route in 1987

Ossington Avenue is named after the ancestral Nottingham home of the Denison family (see Ossington), early land-owners around the street's southern terminus. (A number of area streets bear Denison-associated names: George Taylor Denison's 'Brookfield House' stood at the northwest corner of Ossington and Queen Street from around 1815 to 1876, giving its name to Brookfield Street; Dover Court was the residence of nephew Richard Lippincott, initially accessed by Dover Court Road (roughly following the course of contemporary Dovercourt Road); the Fennings and Taylor branches of the family have namesakes as Fennings and Rolyat Streets; Heydon Park and Rusholme were Denison manor houses, giving their names to other local streets.)

The origin of Ossington Avenue lies in John Graves Simcoe's 1793 plan for a western military road from York, the new capital of Upper Canada. The initial conception of this road ran west down contemporary Queen Street West (then Lot Street), hugging the shore of Lake Ontario onward to Niagara. This road was to be named Dundas Street, in honor of Simcoe's friend Henry Dundas.

Following the War of 1812, this route was deemed too vulnerable to American invasion, and was destroyed. A more northerly route was substituted, and cut by the Queen's Rangers under the direction of Captain George Taylor Denison, completed by 1817. This route involved an unusual dogleg. Its first segment continued west along Queen Street West, crossing Garrison Creek, and running to the eastern edge of Park Lot 25 (purchased not long before by Denison himself); a short 560-metre (1,840 ft) segment then turned north, running between Denison's Park Lot 25 and the neighbouring Park Lot 24 of James Givins; upon meeting an ancient First Nations "desire path" trail following the high ground beneath the western fork of Garrison Creek, the route turned again west along this natural contour, forming the final segment of Dundas Street (and by far the longest, running approximately 70 kilometres (43 mi) west to the town of Dundas, Ontario, along the route of contemporary Dundas Street West).

The 560-metre (1,840 ft) north–south segment of Dundas Street would become the contemporary "Ossington Strip", and was developed as a mixed commercial and residential street beginning in the 1840s. The Ontario Provincial Lunatic Asylum was opened at the foot of Dundas and Queen Street in 1850. From the 1850s to around 1900, the area was a center of Toronto's meatpacking industry, with slaughterhouses and stockyards on the blocks and laneways just to the east.

Nomenclature would be confusing until a late 1910s reform. By 1884, a street named "Ossington Avenue" had been constructed, running north from Dundas to Bloor Street, and by 1890, as far as St. Clair (though the section north of Davenport was eventually renamed to Winona Drive, and contemporary Ossington Avenue ends at Davenport). As of 1884, "Dundas Street" is a T-shaped entity comprising the Ossington Strip and contemporary Dundas Street West, west of the Garrison Creek bridge at contemporary Crawford Street. By 1894, the eastern spur of Dundas Street had been renamed, with "Arthur Street" consistently applied to contemporary Dundas Street West eastward from the Ossington Strip. Finally, by 1923, contemporary naming is in place, with the Ossington Strip having been renamed "Ossington Avenue" (continuously with the segment running northward from contemporary Dundas and Ossington) and Arthur Street having been renamed "Dundas Street" (continuously with the segment running eastward from contemporary Dundas and Ossington).

In 1968, after assassinating Martin Luther King Jr., James Earl Ray fled to Toronto and lived in a rooming house on Ossington Avenue. Ray would visit "a bar around the corner from Ossington St.", probably the Drake Hotel, where he would watch the news on the bar's television.

As Toronto expanded west and other retail facilities opened, the Ossington Strip became an area of industrial uses, including automotive repairs and storage facilities. By 2003, this area became known for crime and the known presence of Vietnamese criminal gangs and street drug peddlers. A double murder in a karaoke bar that year sparked neighbourhood action in concert with the police to cut down on crime.

By 2007, the low rents of stores along Ossington became attractive after rents along Queen Street West increased. This led to an influx of bars, restaurants, and stores. By 2009, the number of bars and restaurants created tension with residents of the surrounding neighbourhood, and licensing controls were imposed to stop the opening of more businesses of the same kind. In 2010, the restrictions on new restaurants along Ossington were lifted, leading to the opening of several new establishments.

== Character ==
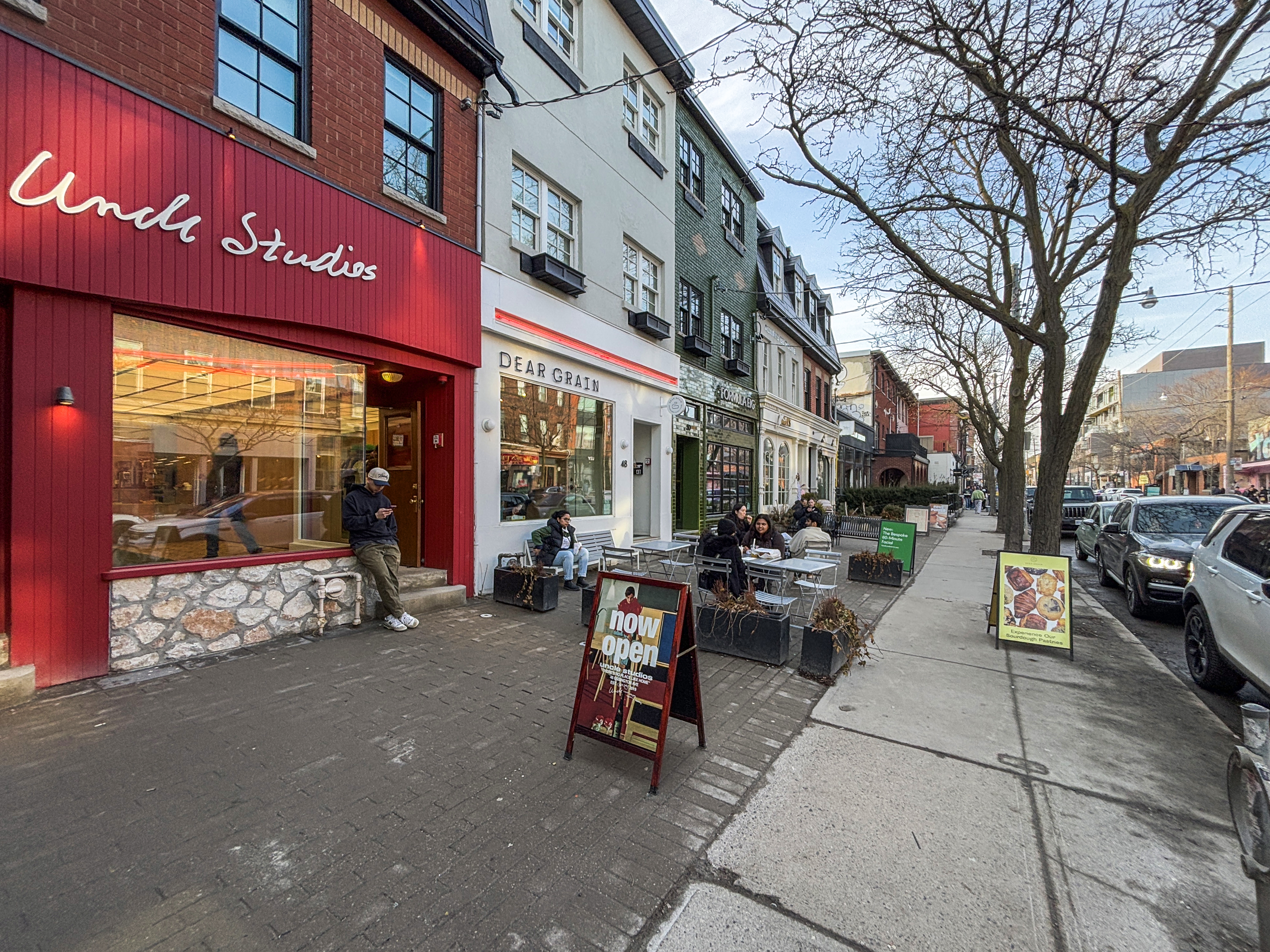
Boutique in Ossington Avenue

At its south end, Ossington starts at Queen Street and goes north, up a hill to Dundas Street. South of Queen is the Centre for Addiction and Mental Health's (CAMH) Queen Street Health Centre complex. From Shaw Street west to Dovercourt, the south side of Queen street is used for CAMH facilities. In summer 2012, Ossington was extended southward onto the CAMH campus and called Lower Ossington Avenue.

From this intersection north to Dundas, Ossington is largely lined with low-rise retail storefronts, typically with apartments on upper floors; other buildings house light industrial uses. Most buildings along this stretch date to the 19th century, and many have been restored in their conversion into restaurants and trendy stores, which have attracted visitors from around the Greater Toronto Area and made the area a magnet for international tourists visiting Toronto.

North of Dundas, the street changes to a primarily residential street. The road slopes down here as it goes into the Garrison Creek ravine, (the creek is buried nowadays) then starts a gradual slope up to its terminus at Davenport. The homes are typically two-story detached or semi-detached homes. This stretch has streetcar tracks and is used by the TTC often for short-turns by the 505 Dundas and 506 College streetcar routes.

North of College, on the west side is Dewson Street public school. One block east on Shaw Street is Central Commerce Collegiate high school. The next street to connect is Harbord Street which goes east from Ossington to Queen's Park Circle. The area is residential on both sides of the street.

North of Bloor Street, the street rises gently until just before Davenport where it reaches the old shoreline and the street rises rapidly to meet Davenport. Except for some businesses around the railway bridge north of Dupont, both sides of the street are two-storey residences.

== Public transit ==
Ossington Avenue is served by the 63 Ossington TTC bus route. The bus route connects to the Toronto Transit Commission's Line 2 Bloor–Danforth Ossington subway station. Route 63 was part of the Toronto trolleybus system from December 1947 until 1992, but since then has been served by conventional buses.
