= Jane Loop =

Toronto Transit Commission (TTC) streetcar turning loop and bus station

Coordinates: 43°38′57″N 79°29′03″W

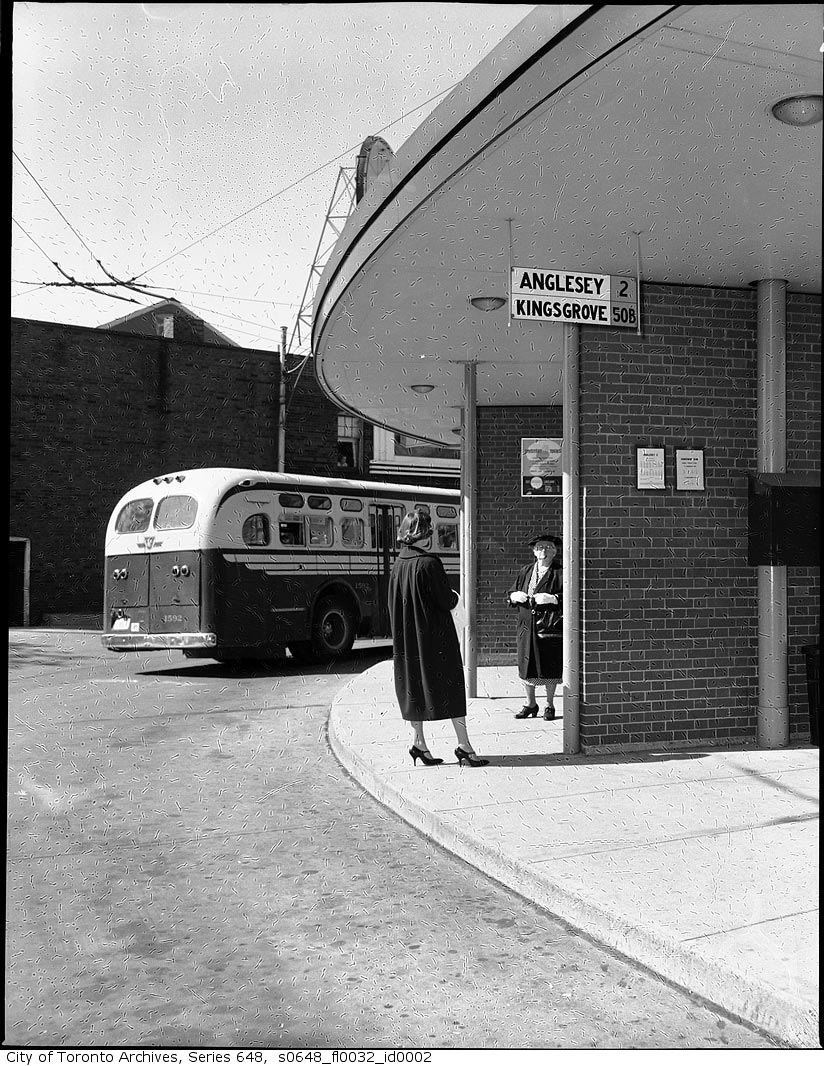
A bus exiting the outer ring of the Jane Loop and a bus bay served by two routes

Jane Loop was an important Toronto Transit Commission (TTC) streetcar turning loop and bus station, prior to the completion of the Bloor Danforth Subway line. The Jane Loop opened on December 31, 1923; it was the western end of Bloor Streetcar line from 1925 to 1968. The loop was at a boundary between two zones in the TTC's zoned fare system. Half a dozen or so buses and trolleybuses terminated at the loop.

== Background ==
In 1915, the Toronto Civic Railways, owned by the City of Toronto, opened its Bloor streetcar line along Bloor Street west from Dundas Street initially to Indian Road then later to Runnymede Road in 1917. The TCR used double-ended streetcars, so there were crossovers at each end of the line. After the Toronto Transportation Commission took over the TCR in 1921, it extended the line further west to Jane Street terminating at a newly constructed Jane Loop. At this time, there were no streetcar tracks on Bloor Street between Lansdowne Avenue and Dundas Street, and the TTC named the line west of Dundas Street as the "Bloor West" line. However, on August 25, 1925, the Bloor streetcar line was extended west from Lansdowne Avenue to Dundas Street and Jane Loop, absorbing the former Bloor West line. In 1966, the Bloor–Danforth subway line replaced the Bloor streetcar line between Woodbine and Keele stations. From then, the Bloor streetcar shuttle started running between Keele station and Jane Loop until replaced by an extension of the subway line in 1968.
