= Presidents' Conference Committee (Toronto streetcar) =

Class of Toronto streetcar

Toronto PCC streetcars
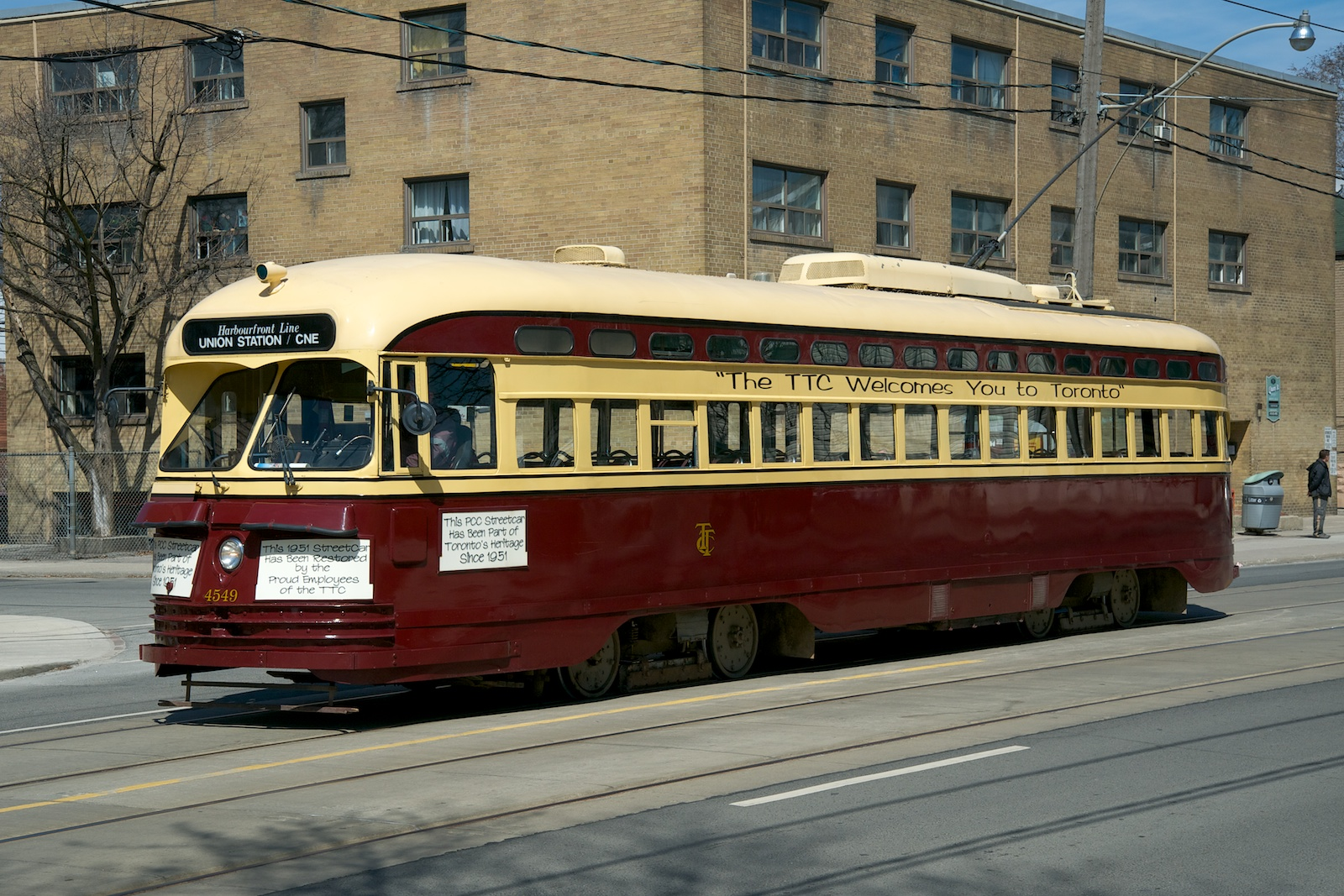
- Class A-15 PCC 4549 rebuilt from class A-8
- Manufacturer: Canadian Car and Foundry (classes A-1–A-8)
- Family name: Presidents' Conference Committee
- Constructed: 1938–1951 (classes A-1–A-8)
- Capacity: 46; crush load: 134 max.
- Operator: Toronto Transit Commission
- Line served: Toronto streetcar system

Specifications
- Weight: 37,400 lb (17,000 kg) (empty)
- Traction system: 4 × 48 hp or 36 kW continuous, 4 × 55 hp or 41 kW one hour (rating)
- Acceleration: 4.3 mph/s (6.9 km/(h⋅s))
- Deceleration: 3.6 mph/s (5.8 km/(h⋅s)); emergency 9.0 mph/s (14.5 km/(h⋅s))
- Electric system: 600 V DC Overhead trolley wire
- Minimum turning radius: 36 ft (10.973 m)
- Track gauge: 4 ft 10 7/8 in (1,495 mm) Toronto gauge

Notes/references
- Capacity, weight, traction system, acceleration, deceleration, etc. are specific to the A-8 class and may be different for other cars.

The Presidents' Conference Committee Car was a streetcar used by the Toronto Transportation Commission and the Toronto Transit Commission. The PCC streetcar was designed by the Presidents' Conference Committee, a group of transit operators in the United States and Canada.

The TTC purchased 745 PCC streetcars in all, making it the largest PCC fleet in North America. Of that, 317 were air-electric (with air-compressor) and 428 all-electric (no air-compressor); 540 ordered new and 205 used (from several U.S. operators abandoning streetcar service). 175 PCCs had couplers for multiple-unit operation, and the TTC used them to assemble 2-car PCC trains. The TTC had only a maximum of 744 PCCs in service because car 4063 was scrapped after it derailed and crashed into Lansdowne Carhouse wall on 20 January 1947. Today, only two PCCs remain in Toronto, bearing the original 1951 fleet numbers of 4500 and 4549, for charters and special events.

Most of the PCCs were scrapped, with some becoming stationary structures such as restaurants, shops or farm sheds. Other retired TTC PCC cars were purchased for preservation by other organizations, such as rail museums, a few of which continue to operate Toronto PCCs on their own museum rail lines. Five former Toronto cars continue to operate on the Kenosha Electric Railway, a new heritage streetcar line, in Kenosha, Wisconsin.

== Fleet ==
The TTC had two broad types of PCCs: air-electric and all-electric. Air-electric PCCs were built until 1945; all-electrics after 1945. Air-electrics used a compressed air system to operate doors and brakes while the all-electrics had no air functions as all its components were electrically operated. The all-electrics had a different styling that usually made them easily distinguishable from air-electrics. A major visual difference was that the all-electrics (except the former Kansas City PCCs, A-14-class) had standee windows, which none of the air-electrics had.

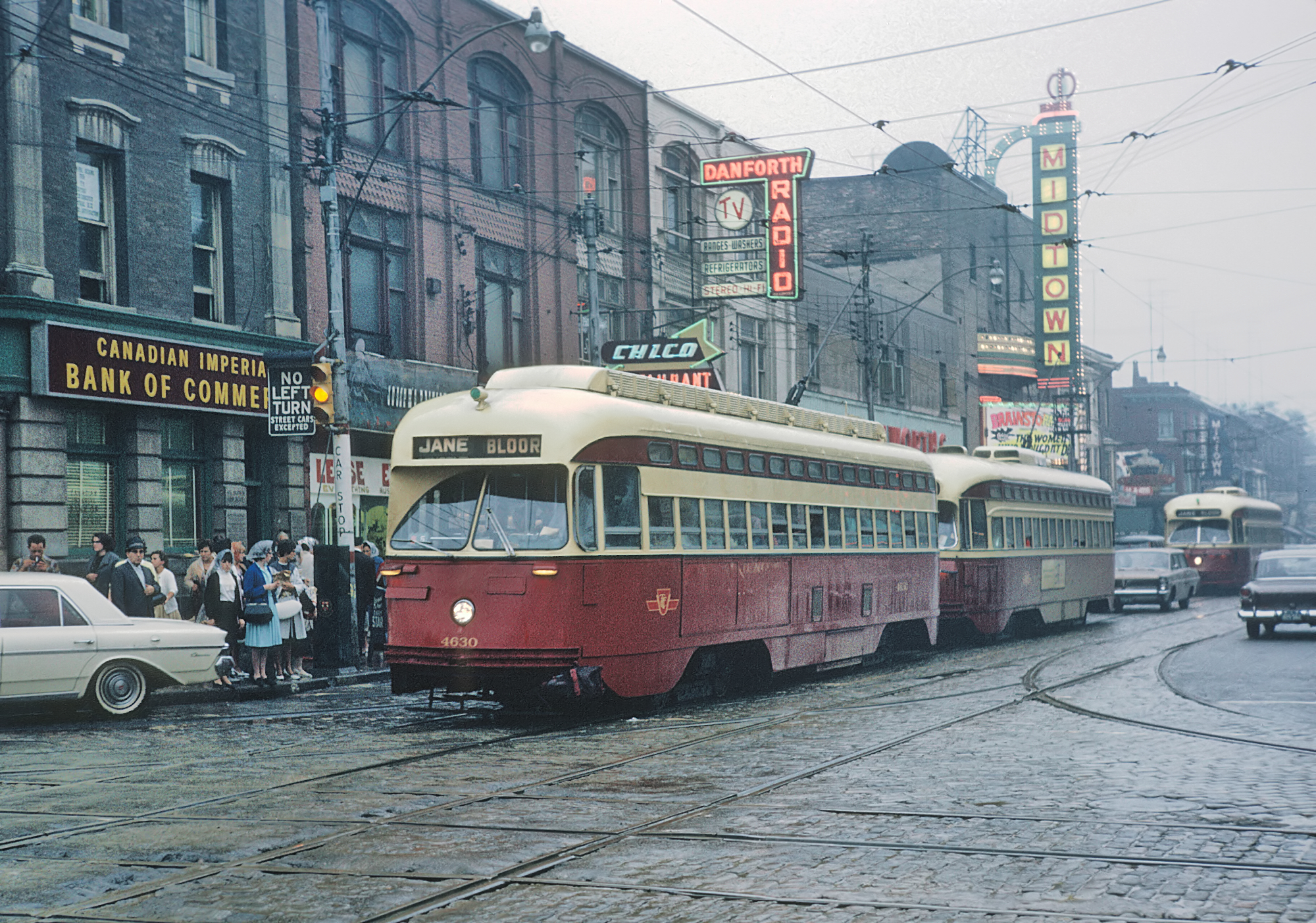
MU-train with a class A-11 (former Cleveland) & A-7 car on the Bloor streetcar line at Bathurst Street in 1965

The TTC ordered 100 air-electrics (A-7-class) with couplers for two-car multiple-unit operation. Later it installed couplers on 75 PCCs purchased second-hand from Cleveland (classes A-11 and A-12). MU-trains operated during the rush hours on the Bloor streetcar line between 1950 and 1966, and on the Queen streetcar line, today's 501 Queen, between the Neville and Humber loops, from 1967 to early 1977. The theory was that a two-car train could load/unload at a stop and pass through an intersection as fast as a single car. In 1960, there were 55 PCC-trains operating on the Bloor line operating on frequencies as little as 129 seconds. Two-car trains could only be run on lines specially prepared for such operation. Trains had two trolley poles contacting the overhead; thus, necessary-action contacts on the overhead wire had to be relocated. (NA-contacts relay an operator command to change a track switch setting.) Neville Park Loop on the Queen streetcar line (today 501 Queen) had to be rebuilt to broader radius to handle two-car trains.

=== New purchases ===
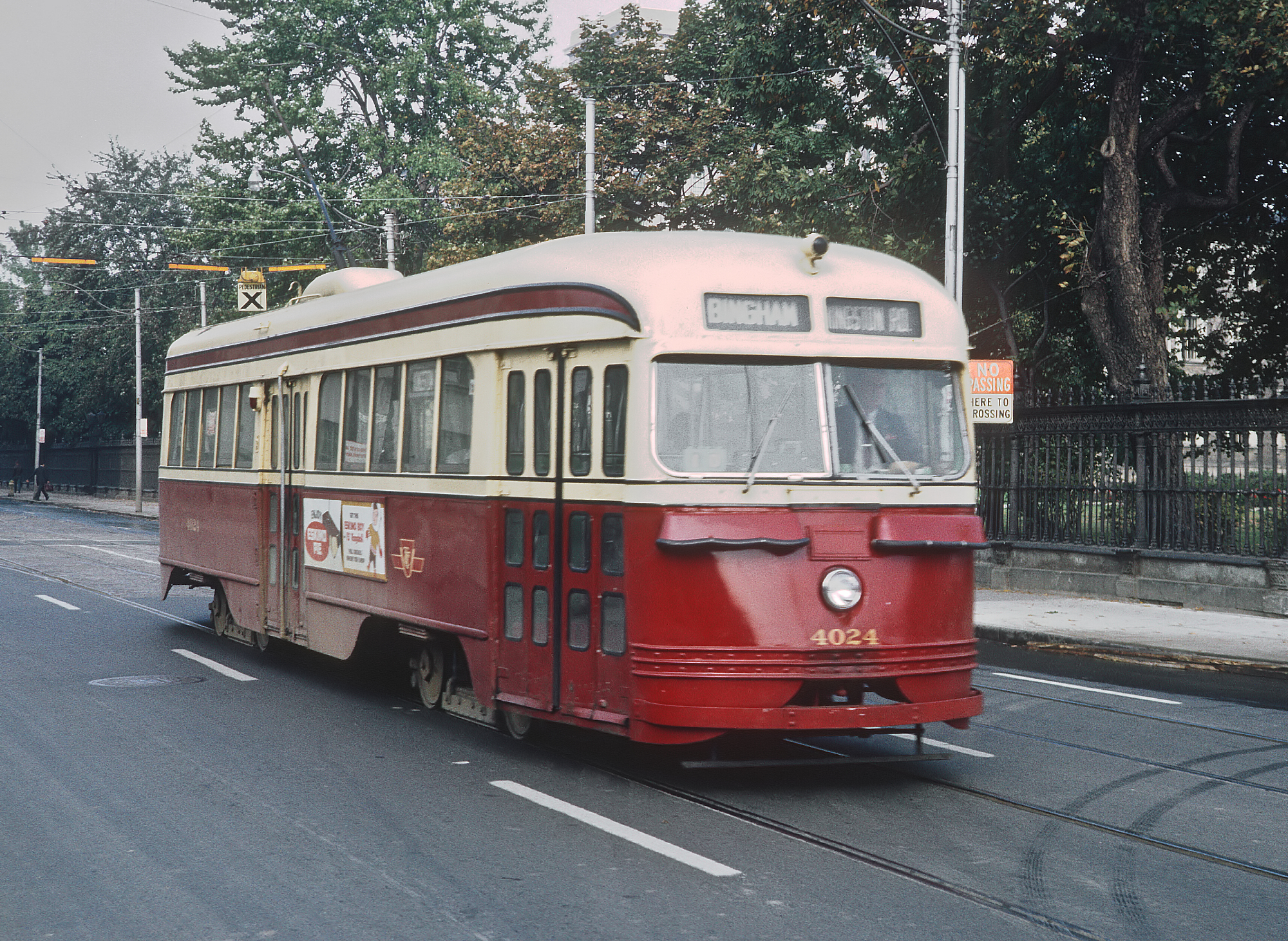
A-1-class air-electric PCC 4024

The first PCC acquisitions, classes A-1 to A-8, were for new PCCs, with each class representing a separate order to the manufacturer. PCCs ordered new by the TTC were built in Montreal, Quebec by Canadian Car and Foundry under license from the St. Louis Car Company of St. Louis, Missouri. The car body shells and trucks were fabricated by St. Louis Car Company, and shipped to Canadian Car and Foundry, who then installed the components and completed the cars.

Initially, the first 3 PCC classes were numbered PC-1, PC-2 and PC-3. However, by 1944, they would be renamed to A-1, A-2 and A-3.

The first order for PCCs (class PC-1, later renamed as A-1) was placed in March 1938 for 140 air-electric cars. At this time, this was the largest PCC order placed to date in North America, although it would be surpassed by a later order from Chicago. They replaced 27 wooden former TRC cars and 30 3-door class Q "Harvey" trailers. The new PCCs first went into service on 23 September 1938 along the St. Clair streetcar line (today's 512 St. Clair).

In the fall of 1940, the TTC ordered 50 class PC-2 (later A-2) cars. The PC-2 cars went into service on 24 September 1940 along the King streetcar line (today 504 King). The TTC retired 30 more former TRC cars and another 30 Harvey trailers.

By March 1942, the TTC received its third PCC order (class PC-3, later A-3) of 60 cars. This class had technological improvements over the first two classes such as super-resilient wheels.

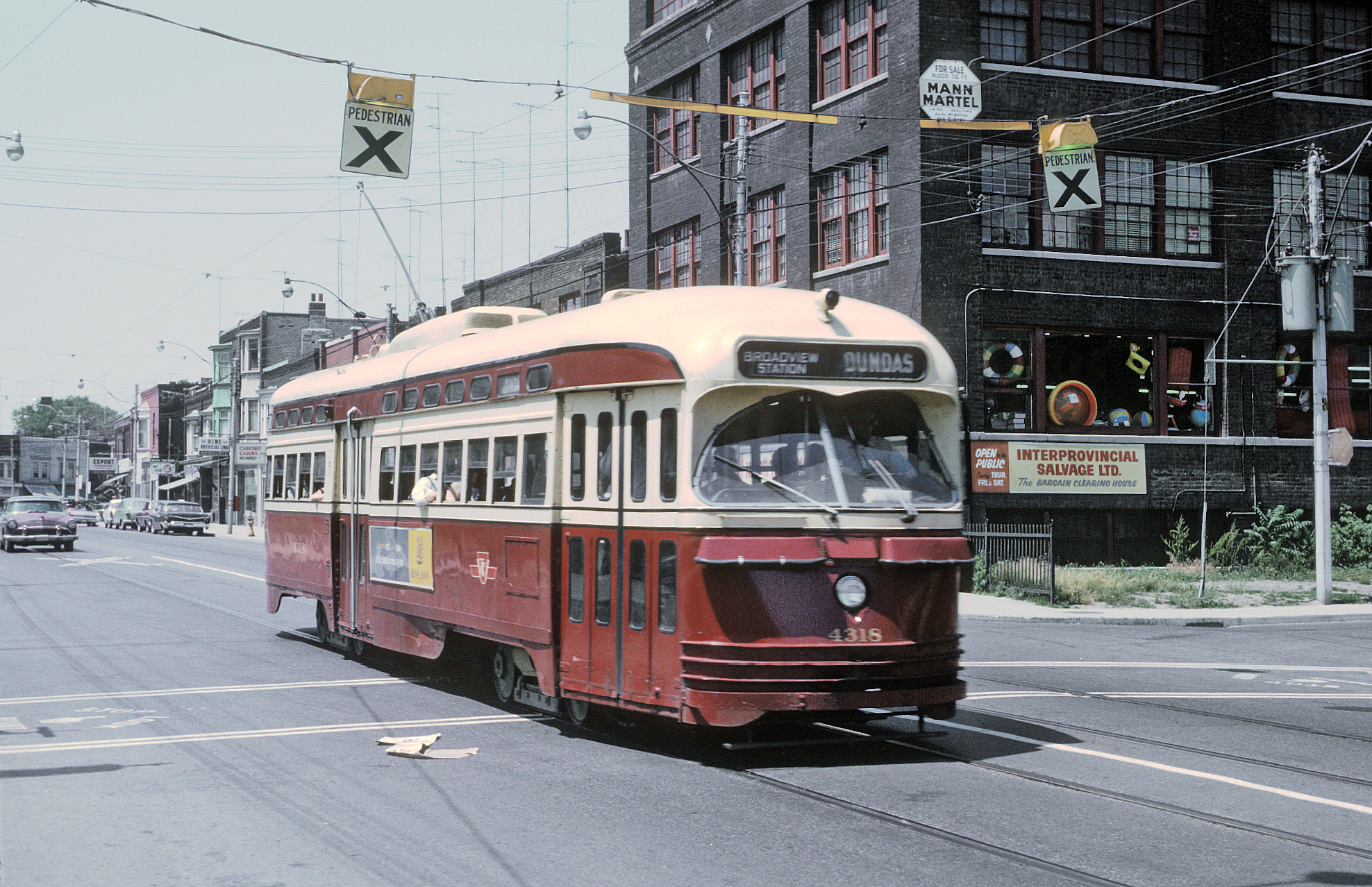
A-6-class all-electric PCC 4315

In March 1942, the TTC wanted to order 60 more PCCs. However, due to war-time rationing, it received only 15, arriving in January and February 1944. These class A-4 cars were assigned to the St. Clair Carhouse, and boosted service on existing lines. The final 25 air-electric PCCs that the TTC ordered (class A-5) arrived in 1945. Because of war-time shortages, both class A-4 and A-5 cars had lower quality components for passenger fixtures, that were replaced after the war. The A-5 cars permitted the replacement of Peter Witt streetcars on the Dupont streetcar line.

The next three PCC orders came after the war, and were for all-electric PCCs. The TTC wanted to retire its 195 remaining wooden former TRC cars built between 1911 and 1917.

The TTC ordered its first 100 all-electric PCC cars in May 1946. These A-6 cars arrived from December 1947 to the spring of 1948. The new cars were assigned to the Bloor and Carlton (today 506 Carlton) routes displacing their air-electric cars to other routes.

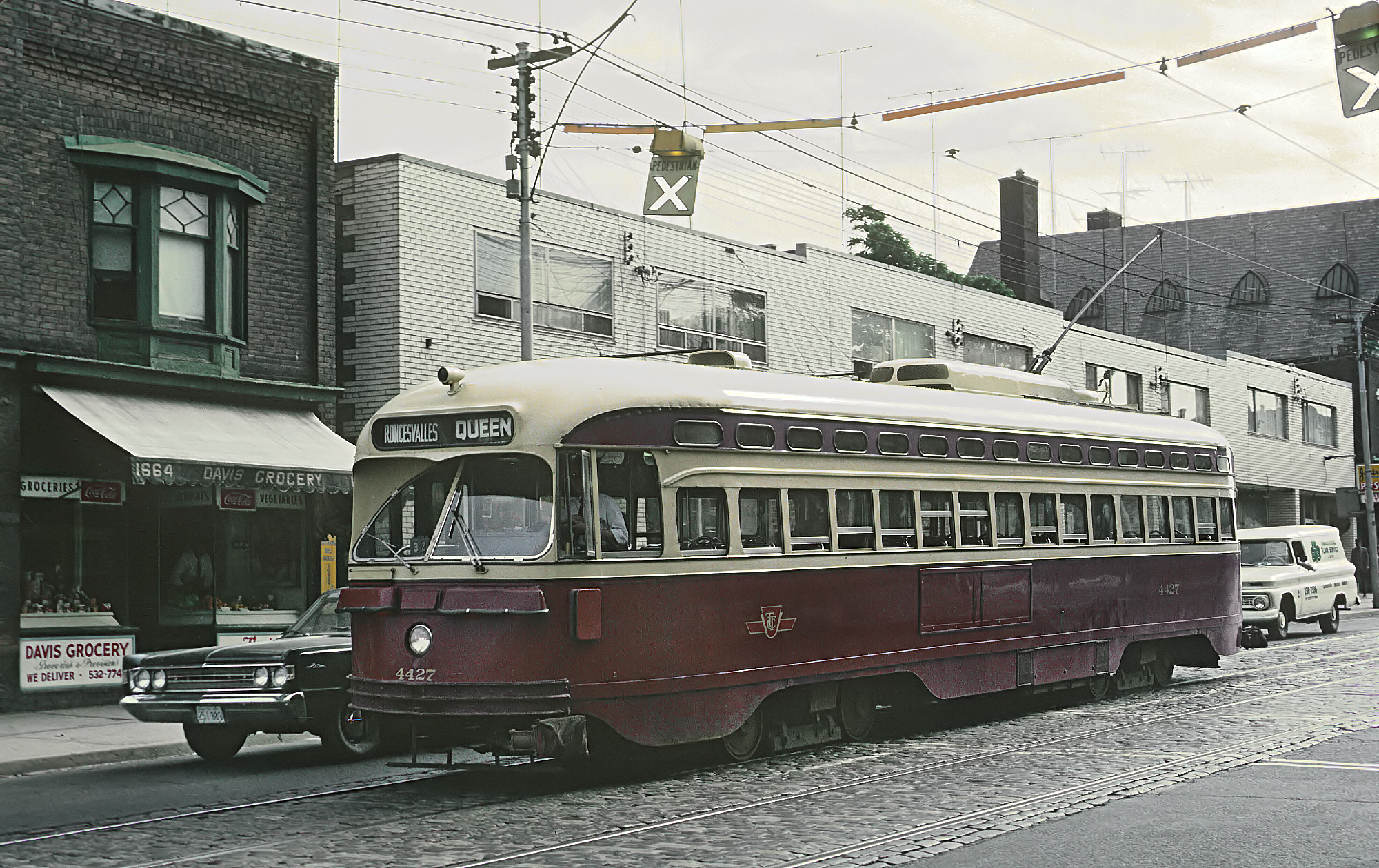
Class A-7 all-electric PCC 4427 equipped with couplers

The next order (to become the A-7 class) were for 100 multiple-unit PCCs to be assigned to the busy Bloor streetcar line. These cars would later be supplemented by second-hand cars from Cleveland (classes A-11 and A-12) fitted with couplers.

The final order the TTC made for new PCC cars was delivered in 1951. There were only 50 cars purchased for class A-8 because by this time new PCCs were much more expensive to buy. The A-8 class was the third last order for new PCCs in North America, with only orders from Boston and San Francisco remaining to be completed. The arrival of the A-8 class provided enough streetcars to retire the last of the wooden, class BB streetcars that the TTC inherited from the Toronto Railway Company in 1921.

=== Second-hand purchases ===
In 1951, the TTC still had 348 Peter Witt cars and 105 trailers. Since the Yonge streetcar line used only 70 Peter Witt trailer trains, the opening of the Yonge subway (part of today's Line 1 Yonge–University) in 1954 would in itself not allow the retirement of the remaining Peter Witt fleet. The TTC wished to avoid the high cost of buying new PCCs; thus, it had started to search for second-hand PCCs from U.S. transit operators closing out streetcar operations.

In 1950, the TTC acquired 50 all-electric PCCs (class A-9) and 27 older air-electrics (class A-10) from the Cincinnati Street Railway. Both sets of former Cincinnati cars were built by the St. Louis Car Company. In Cincinnati, these cars all had two trolley poles like for a trolley bus. The TTC removed one of the two poles.

In 1952, the TTC purchased 75 all-electric PCCs from the Cleveland Transit System. Fifty were built by Pullman-Standard becoming class A-11 (dubbed "Cleveland"), and twenty-five by the St. Louis Car Company becoming class A-12 ("Louisville"). Each class had roof housing for fan equipment, a feature which the TTC chose to disable. The housing gave the cars a distinctive appearance, with each class having a distinctively different style of housing. The A-12 former Louisville cars were built for the Louisville Railway Company but were never put into service there. The cars were sold to the Cleveland Transit System as deliveries to Louisville were being made, the last 10 of the 25 "Louisville" cars being shipped directly to Cleveland.

Also in 1952, the TTC purchased 48 all-electric PCCs from the Birmingham Electric Company. These class A-13 ("Birmingham") cars were built by Pullman-Standard. In Birmingham, Alabama, these PCCs had the notoriety of having racially segregated seating, a practice that ceased with their shipment to Toronto.

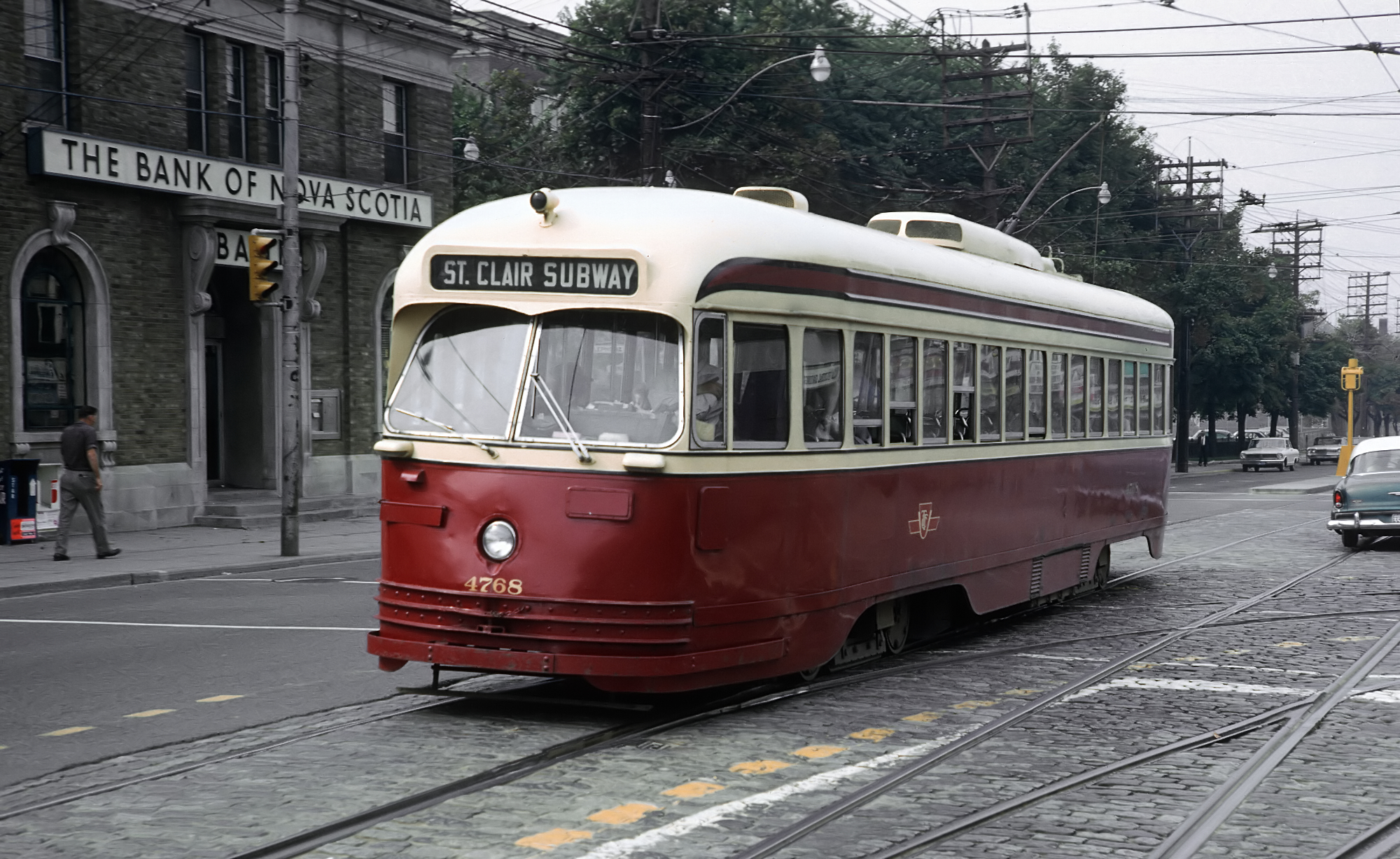
Class A-14, St. Louis-built all-electric without standee windows

In 1957, the TTC purchased 30 all-electric PCCs from the Kansas City Public Service Company, and became class A-14 ("Kansas City"). These are the only all-electric PCCs not to have standee windows as the president of Kansas City Public Service wanted "none of those little apertures". The A-14 cars supported only one-piece front rollsigns. Because of this, the A-14 cars would show only destinations for the St. Clair and Earlscourt routes (today 512 St. Clair) effectively confining the A-14 cars to the St. Clair streetcar line.

The "Kansas City" PCCs became the TTC's final purchase of second-hand PCC streetcars. At this time, only Mexico City had more second-hand PCCs.

The TTC had to modify all its second-hand PCCs to its standards. The work included:

- Regauging to TTC gauge.
- Adding Necessary Action circuits (an exclusively Toronto feature) to activate track switches.
- Removing or sealing (A-14) backup controls.
- Removing one of the two poles from the former Cincinnati cars (A-9 & A-10).
- Adding treadle-operation to A-9, A-11, A-12 and A-13 cars.
- Modifying doors to fold outward, if not so configured.
- Adding the green advance light on the roof above the front rollsigns.
- Removing ventilation fans from A-11 and A-12 cars.
- Adding two couplers each to A-11 and A-12 cars.

By 1958, there were still 132 Peter Witt streetcars in service despite the presence of 744 PCC streetcars. The opening of the University subway extension (part of today's Line 1 Yonge–University) in 1963, and the closure of the Oakwood and Dupont streetcar lines ended Peter Witt operation, making the Toronto streetcar fleet 100% PCC.

=== Class A-15 and retirement ===
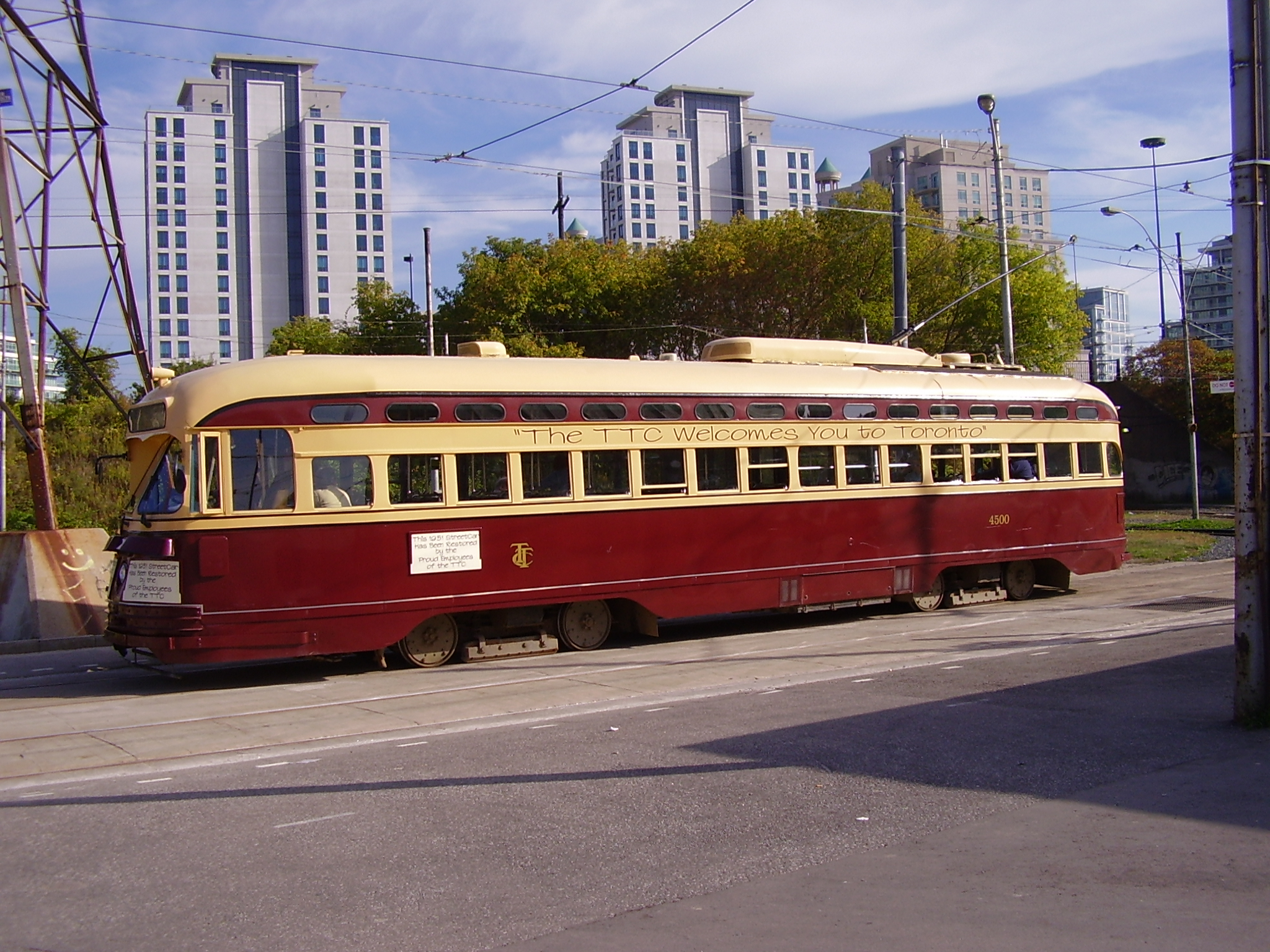
PCC 4500 at Humber Loop

In the late 1980s, as Canadian Light Rail Vehicles (CLRVs) were replacing the aging PCC fleet, the TTC started to create a new class of PCC cars, the A-15 class, by rebuilding A-8-class cars for use on the then-new Harbourfront streetcar line (part of today's 509 Harbourfront route). The refurbishment program was cancelled in 1991 following an edict by the Metropolitan Toronto government that all future vehicle purchases must be accessible; all 19 PCCs were rebuilt, with the last car outshopped in 1992. However, in 1995, the A-15 class PCCs were retired because the new CLRV fleet could handle the ridership, which had declined by that time.

The class A-15 cars were numbered 4600–4618; however, two cars (4604 and 4605) were painted with their original A-8-class numbers for historical accuracy. Thus, officially they were 4604 and 4605, but publicly they were known as 4500 and 4549, respectively. These two cars were classified as A-15H ("H" for "historical") and were restored as closely as possible to their original condition. These are the only two PCCs remaining in Toronto, and they are used for charters and special events.

=== Rail grinder trains ===
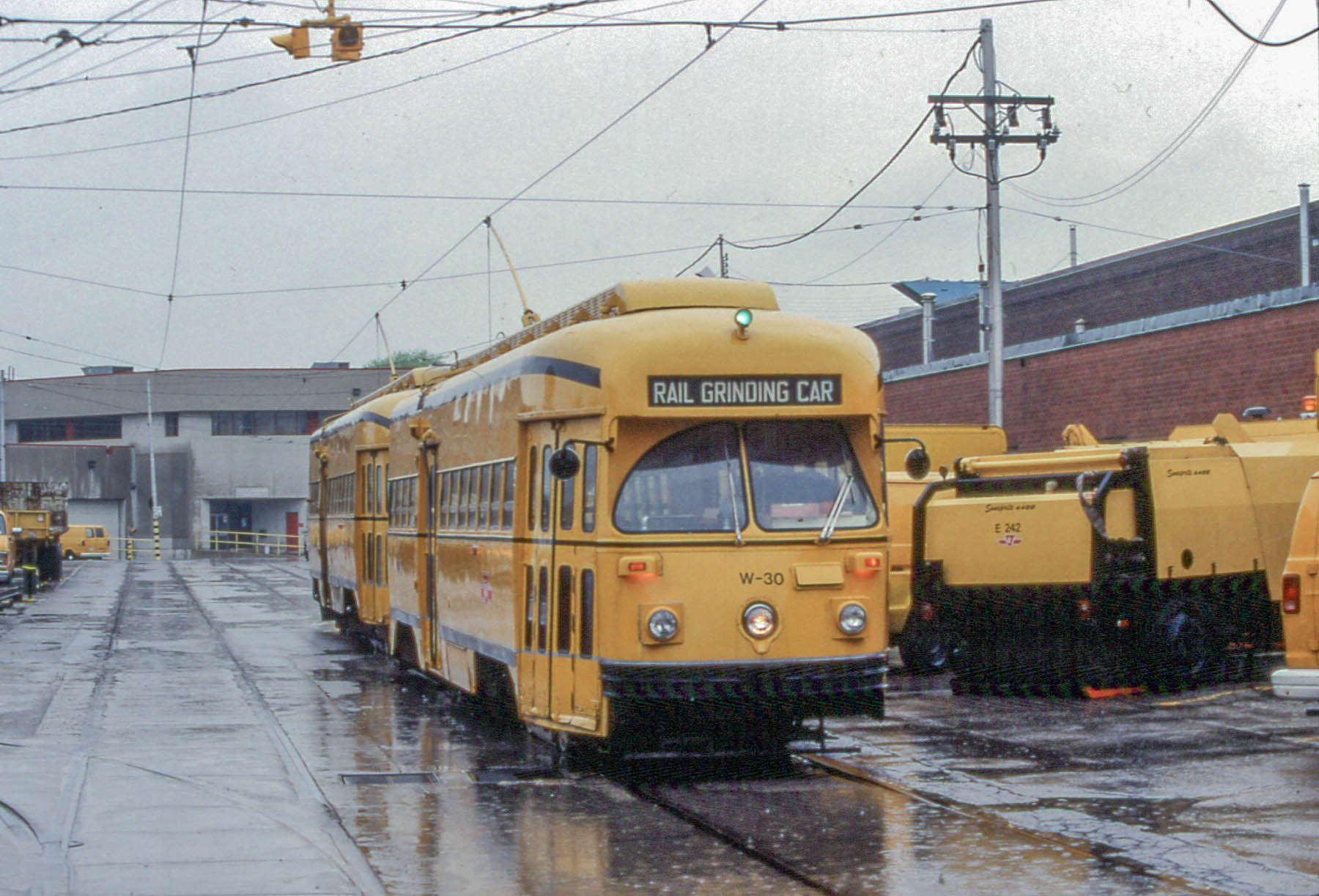
W-30 & W-31 rail grinding train at Hillcrest Complex, 1995

The TTC constructed two rail grinder trains from two pairs of PCC cars retired from passenger service. One train was adapted for the subway system and the other was for the streetcar system.

In 1970, the TTC converted two class A-7 PCCs (4446 and 4410) into a subway rail grinder train (renumbering the cars as RT-14 and RT-15). The cars were modified for the third-rail based subway system. The two cars were operated coupled back-to-back, and operators could access either car from within the train. The front two doors were modified so that one door opened at platform level while the other opened closer to the ground. A centre platform-level door was added on the left side of each car. The original centre doors and many of the windows of the former streetcars were blocked off. This train was retired in 1989.

About 1974, the TTC converted two class A-11 PCCs (4631 and 4668) into a streetcar system rail grinder train (renumbering the cars as W-30 and W-31). W-31 had its brake shoes replaced by rail grinding blocks. W-30 pulled the train and provided braking power. The train's last rail grinding job was in 1999; in 2002, the two cars were donated to the Halton County Radial Railway.

=== Summary ===
These PCCs made up the TTC fleet:

Class	Builder	Description	Fleet numbers	Class size	Year built	Year retired	Notes
A-1	CC&F	Air-electric	4000–4139	140	1938	1966	
A-2	CC&F	Air-electric	4150–4199	50	1940	1972	
A-3	CC&F	Air-electric	4200–4259	60	1941–1942	1971	
A-4	CC&F	Air-electric	4260–4274	15	1943–1944	1970	
A-5	CC&F	Air-electric	4275–4299	25	1944–1945	1970	
A-6	CC&F	All-electric	4300–4399	100	1947	1990	
A-7	CC&F	All-electric; Multiple-unit	4400–4499	100	1949	1991	
A-8	CC&F	All-electric	4500–4549	50	1950–1951	1991	19 cars rebuilt to become Class A-15
A-9	St. Louis	All-electric	4550–4574	25	1947	1982	Former Cincinnati Street Railway 1150–1174); purchased 1950
A-10	St. Louis	Air-electric	4575–4601	27	1939–1940	1972	Former Cincinnati Street Railway 1100–1126; purchased 1950
A-11	Pullman	All-electric; Multiple-unit	4625–4674	50	1946	1982	Former Cleveland Transit System 4200–4249; purchased 1952
A-12	St. Louis	All-electric; Multiple-unit	4675–4699	25	1946	1982	Former Cleveland Transit System 4250–4274, former Louisville Railway Company 525 and 501 to 524; purchased 1952
A-13	Pullman	All-electric	4700–4747	48	1946–1947	1983	Former Birmingham Electric Company 800–847; purchased 1952
A-14	St. Louis	All-electric	4750–4779	30	1946–1947	1977	Former Kansas City Public Service Company 526 535 551 727 740 747 749 754 756 757 760 762 765 767 769 771 773 775 776 778 779 780 782 784 785 789 790 792 793 794; purchased 1957
A-15	TTC	All-electric	4600–4618	19	1986–1991	1995	Rebuilt from A-8-class cars: 4505 4512 4537 4548 4500 4549 4528 4536 4544 4526 4541 4540 4543 4503 4509 4518 4515 4539 4501; 4601 rebuilt by Can Car Rail; 4604 & 4605 retain original numbers 4500 & 4549
---	TTC	All-electric; Rail grinder	RT-14 & RT-15	2	1970	1989	Subway rail grinding train; rebuilt from A-7-class 4446 and 4410
---	TTC	All-electric; Rail grinder	W-30 & W-31	2	1976	2002	Surface rail grinding train; rebuilt from A-11-class 4631 and 4668

CC&F	Canadian Car and Foundry
Pullman	Pullman Company
St. Louis	St. Louis Car Company
TTC	Toronto Transit Commission

== Timeline ==
Date	Event
20 August 1938	The first PCC delivery, class PC-1 (later renamed to A-1) cars 4001 and 4002, arrived at the Hillcrest Complex.
24 September 1938	The St. Clair route (today's 512 St. Clair) became the first route in Toronto to have PCC service.
18 July 1939	The Carton route (today's 506 Carlton) was converted to all-PCC operation.
1 December 1939	PCCs replaced all Peter Witt streetcars on the Bloor and Dundas (now the 505 Dundas) routes.
24 December 1939	As 50 Class PC-2/A-2 PCC's were being delivered, PCCs went into base service on the King route (today's 504 King).
1 May 1941	Base PCC service begins on the Queen route (now the 501 Queen).
3 February 1942	As 60 Class PC-3/A-3 PCC's were being delivered, PCCs went into base service on the Bathurst route (today's 511 Bathurst).
13 January 1944	Fifteen class A-4 PCCs started to arrive. Due to war-time rationing, this was the smallest PCC order.
19 March 1945	The final class A-5 PCCs arrive. Due to war-time rationing, the class had only 25 cars.
1 February 1948	As 100 all-electric Class A-6 PCC's were being delivered, they began service on the Bloor streetcar line displacing air-electric PCCs and class P Peter Witt cars.
24 April 1949	As 100 Class A-7 PCC's were being delivered, they went into service on the Bloor streetcar line ultimately displacing all A-6-class PCCs. Although the A-7-class PCCs had couplers, they were initially operated singlely.
13 March 1950	The first two-car trains went into service on the Bloor route during peak periods using A-7-class PCCs.
15 October 1950	The first of Former Cincinnati cars, class A-10 air-electric 4597, entered service with its first trip being a rail-fan charter.
23 October 1950	The first three class A-9 (former Cincinnati) PCCs (4550, 4551 and 4556) went into service.
31 January 1951	The class A-8 PCCs start to arrive at the Hillcrest Complex. In 1950, the TTC wanted to purchase 100 more cars from CC&F, but balked at the increased price and cut the order to 50 cars. The A-8 deliveries would allow the TTC to retire the last wooden streetcars it had inherited from the Toronto Railway Company in 1921.
28 November 1952	The class A-12 (former Louisville) PCCs purchased from Cleveland went into service led by PCC 4693. These cars in fact never ran in Louisville and 511 to 525 were delivered direct to Cleveland
15 February 1953	PCC 4657, class A-11 former Cleveland, became the first PCC built by Pullman-Standard to go into service in Toronto. At this time, the TTC installed couplers on only two of these: 4627 and 4656 because of a shortage of parts.
28 April 1953	The class A-13 former Birmingham PCCs went into service led by PCC 4729.
29 April 1954	Former Cleveland A-11 and A-12 PCCs retrofitted with couplers for multiple-unit operation were moved from the Hillcrest Complex to Danforth Carhouse.
6 June 1958	The final A-14 former Kansas City streetcar goes into service. On this date, the TTC PCC fleet size was at its maximum size of 744 cars.
28 February 1963	The University subway (part of today's Line 1 Yonge–University) opens, resulting in the closure of the Dupont streetcar route along Bay Street which in turn allowed the retirement of the remaining Peter Witt streetcars. At this point, the TTC streetcar fleet was 100% PCC.
26 February 1966	The Bloor–Danforth subway line (today Line 2 Bloor–Danforth) replaced the busy Bloor streetcar line as well as 4 other streetcar routes. All-electric PCCs that formerly served the Bloor route displaced air-electric streetcars on surviving routes. The TTC retired 225 of its 310 air-electric PCCs.
17 July 1968	The final batch of retired air-electric PCCs were transferred to Toronto harbour for shipment to Alexandria, Egypt. The Alexandria Region General Transport Administration paid $1,500 for each of the 140 cars it received since 1966.
9 June 1969	Class A-1 PCC 4000 (the first Toronto PCC built but the eleventh delivered) was shipped to the Halton County Radial Railway for preservation. This occurred in the midst of a mass PCC scrapping program.
20 February 1972	A-6-class PCC 4362, the first of 173 rebuilt PCCs, made its first run on a railfan trip after being outshopped. The rebuild program, to extend car-life by 5–10 years, would cost $3.1 million and involve 79 A-6, 45 A-7 and 49 A-8-class PCCs.
25 October 1976	The last A-14 (former Kansas City) car in service, PCC 4779, made its last run. Class A-14 was the first group of second-hand PCCs to be fully retired, as these PCCs had been poorly maintained in Kansas City and were a maintenance problem in Toronto.
30 September 1979	The first Canadian Light Rail Vehicle goes into service, starting the replacement of PCCs.
17 March 1982	The PCC fleet consisted of 172 rebuilt and 24 unrebuilt cars for a total of 196 cars.
30 April 1982	The TTC retired A-13-class, former Birmingham PCC 4703. It was the last unrebuilt PCC, and also the last second-hand PCC, in service.
6 March 1986	A-8-class PCC 4512 was sent to the UTDC's facilities in Kingston for conversion into the first A-15-class PCC (4600).
27 February 1989	The TTC decided to repaint all their A-15-class PCCs in their original colours, a project completed on 22 June 1992.
22 June 1990	Nine A-15-class PCCs inaugurate service on the 604 Harbourfront route (later 510 Spadina)
31 May 1991	Class A-7 PCCs 4460 and 4494, the last PCCs outside of the A-15 class, made their last run.
7 December 1995	PCCs made their last run in regular service. The TTC continue to retain PCCs 4500 and 4549 for special occasions. All other A-15-class PCCs were sold off to outside parties for preservation.

== Disposals ==
After their retirement, several of the TTC's PCCs were sold for different purposes.

=== Continued operation ===
The following PCC cars were sold to other cities for continued operations:

Operator	TTC Class	Car numbers
Note: Car numbers struck through (~~4XXX~~) never re-entered service.
Alexandria, Egypt	A-1	4002 4005 ~~4006~~ 4007 4011 ~~4022~~ 4023 4026 4027 4034 4036 4037 4043 ~~4049~~ 4056 4068 4069 4070 4082 4087 4090 4093 ~~4094~~ 4095 4099 4101 4103 ~~4108~~ 4111 4113 4114 4115 4116 4118 4121 4126 4127 4131 4134
Alexandria, Egypt	A-2	4151 4155 4156 4157 4160 4162 4164 4167 4169 4170 4172 4174 4178 4181 4183 ~~4184~~ 4185 4188 ~~4190~~ 4192 4193 4195 4195 4196
Alexandria, Egypt	A-3	4200 ~~4201~~ 4202 4205 ~~4209~~ 4210 ~~4211~~ ~~4212~~ 4213 4217 ~~4218~~ 4221 ~~4222~~ 4223 4224 4225 ~~4229~~ 4231 ~~4232~~ 4233 4235 4236 4238 4239 4240 4242 4244 4248 4249 4250 4251 4254 ~~4255~~ 4256 4258
Alexandria, Egypt	A-4	4260 4262 4263 4264 ~~4265~~ 4266 ~~4267~~ 4268 4270 4272 4273 4274
Alexandria, Egypt	A-5	4276 4277 4278 4279 4280 ~~4281~~ 4282 ~~4283~~ 4287 4288 4293 ~~4295~~ 4297 4298 ~~4299~~
Alexandria, Egypt	A-10	4575 4576 ~~4577~~ 4579 4580 4581 4582 4583 4584 4585 4587 4588 4590 ~~4591~~ 4592 4598
Alexandria, Egypt	Purchased 1968. Originally numbered 901 to 1027, in random order. 24 of the 140 cars never entered service. 28 cars converted to two-car trains in 1975–1975 and renumbered 600–627. 57 cars converted to double-ended three-car trains in 1972–1978 and renumbered 301–357. All withdrawn by 1984. Only confirmed renumbering is TTC 4114 becoming Alexandria 901. A report from 2010, still available via wayback machine, stated all the PCC cars had been scrapped.	
Transportes Eléctricos de Tampico, Tampico, Mexico	A-3	4226 4228 4247 4253
Transportes Eléctricos de Tampico, Tampico, Mexico	A-10	4578 4586 4589 4593 4597 4599
Transportes Eléctricos de Tampico, Tampico, Mexico	Purchased 1971–1972. System abandoned on 13 December 1974.	
SEPTA, Philadelphia, Pennsylvania	A-13	4706 4707 4709 4710 4711 4718 4724 4726 4727 4728 4729 4731 4732 4734 4740 4741 4744 4746
SEPTA, Philadelphia, Pennsylvania	A-14	4750 4751 4756 4759 4761 4762 4765 4767 4772 4773 4779
SEPTA, Philadelphia, Pennsylvania	Purchased 1976 for $12,500 each. Renumbered 2300–2318 and 2240–2250, in order. All retired 1981–1983.	
San Francisco Municipal Railway	A-14	4752 4754 4757 4758 4763 ~~4764~~ ~~4769~~ 4770 4771 4775 4777
San Francisco Municipal Railway	Purchased 1973. Renumbered SFMR 1190, 1180–1189, in order. 1184 and 1185 never entered service. Retired 1980.	
Greater Cleveland Regional Transit Authority (Shaker Heights Rapid Transit)	A-11	~~4630~~, 4648, 4651, 4652, 4655, 4656, 4662, 4663, 4665
Greater Cleveland Regional Transit Authority (Shaker Heights Rapid Transit)	Purchased 1978. 4630 never entered service. Retained TTC numbers and couplers. Backup controls added. Retired after arrival of Breda LRVs in 1981.	
Kenosha Electric Railway	A-15	4606 4609 4610 4615 4616 4617
Kenosha Electric Railway	Used one at a time on a two-mile (3 km) downtown loop.	

=== Preservation ===
Some museums, such as the Halton County Radial Railway, the Edmonton Radial Railway Society and the National Capital Trolley Museum have preserved Toronto PCCs in working order so that museum visitors can ride them.

TTC No.	Owner	Location	Status	Notes
4000	Halton County Radial Railway	Rockwood, Ontario	Operational	
4349	Edmonton Radial Railway Society	Edmonton, Alberta	Stored	Operable, awaiting regauging
4367	Edmonton Radial Railway Society	Edmonton, Alberta	Stored	Operable, awaiting regauging
4386	Halton County Radial Railway	Rockwood, Ontario	Unrestored	
4426	Halton County Radial Railway	Rockwood, Ontario	Unrestored	
4434	Langford Steam & Mechanical Exhibit	Langford, New York	Static display	
4600	Halton County Radial Railway	Rockwood, Ontario	Operational	Unrestored
4601	Private Owner	St. Clair, Missouri	Static display	Formerly owned by the Michigan Transit Museum, deaccessioned as of January 2015
4602	National Capital Trolley Museum	Silver Spring, Maryland	Operational	Purchased from Trolleyville USA (Olmsted Falls, Ohio) in 2009
4603	National Capital Trolley Museum	Silver Spring, Maryland	Operational	
4607	Arizona Railway Museum	Chandler, Arizona	Static display	
4608	Old Pueblo Trolley	Tucson, Arizona	Static display	
4611	Halton County Radial Railway	Rockwood, Ontario	Operational	Unrestored
4612	Edmonton Radial Railway Society	Edmonton, Alberta	Operational	
4613	M-Line Trolley	Dallas, Texas	Pending	Preparing for PCC service
4614	M-Line Trolley	Dallas, Texas	Operational	Nicknamed "Margaret"; restored in 2019
4618	Halton County Radial Railway	Rockwood, Ontario	Unrestored	Used as the museum ice cream shop
4648	Illinois Railway Museum	Union, Illinois	Operational	Restored to former Cleveland Transit System appearance.
4655	Northern Ohio Railway Museum	Chippewa Lake, Ohio	Unrestored	Renumbered as Cleveland Transit System 4230
4656	Northern Ohio Railway Museum	Chippewa Lake, Ohio	Stored	Not regauged
4684	Halton County Radial Railway	Rockwood, Ontario	Unrestored	
4752	Epoch Developments	River Market, Kansas City, Missouri	Static display	Restored as KCPS 551
W-30	Halton County Radial Railway	Rockwood, Ontario	Operational	Unrestored
W-31	Halton County Radial Railway	Rockwood, Ontario	Operational	Unrestored

== Commemoration ==
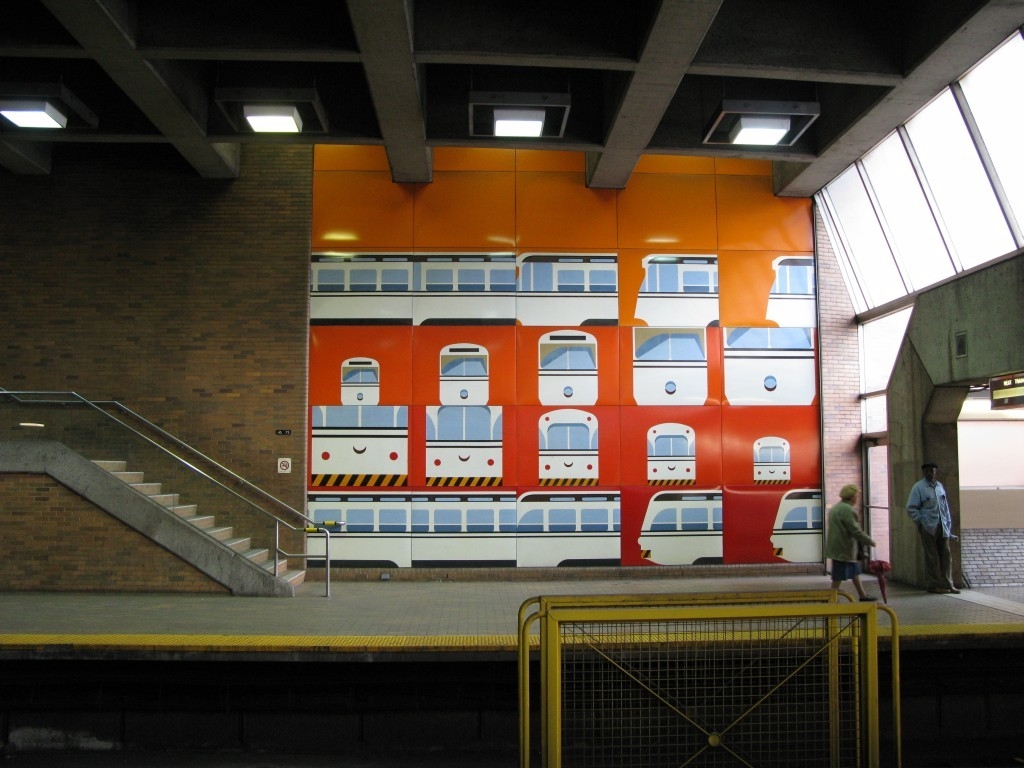
Summertime Streetcar

A pair of enamel murals by Gerald Zeldin entitled Summertime Streetcar are displayed at platform level at Cedarvale station. They depict a stylized PCC car, albeit in Kansas City colours.

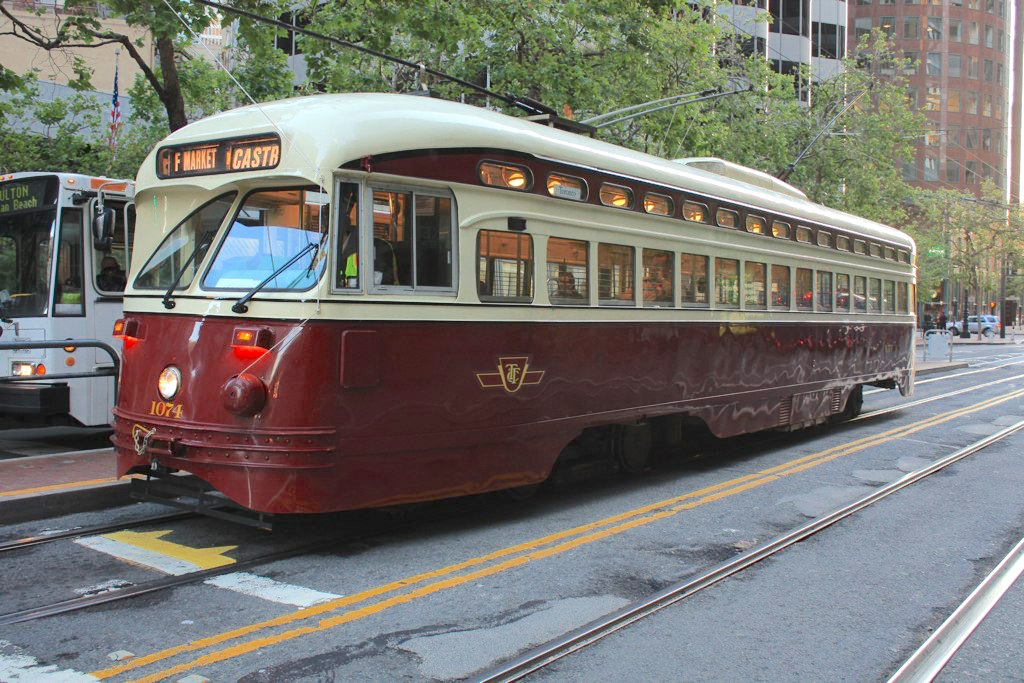
SF MUNI PCC 1074

The San Francisco Municipal Railway (MUNI) painted its PCC 1074 in TTC livery "to honor Toronto"; it runs on the Market Street Railway. However, this car never operated in Toronto: it was originally built for Minneapolis' Twin City Rapid Transit and ultimately bought by MUNI.

== See also ==
- Canadian Light Rail Vehicle (replacement for the PCCs)
- PCC streetcar
- Toronto streetcar system
- Toronto Transit Commission
- Trams
