= Davisville Yard =

Rail yard of the Toronto Transit Commission

Coordinates: 43.69729°N 79.39753°W

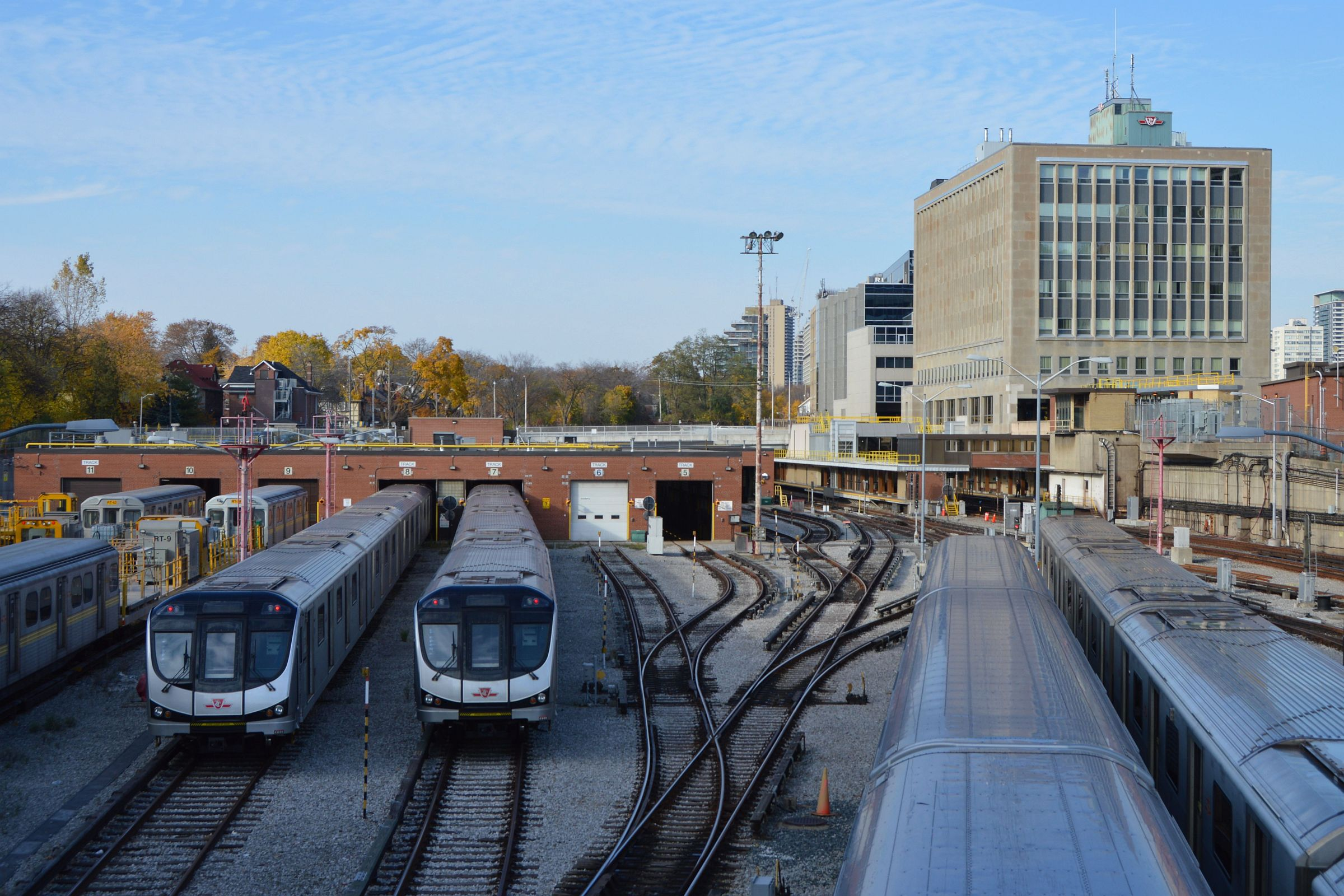
- North view from the Beltline Trail bridge

Overview
- Locale: Chaplin Estates, Toronto

Service
- System: Toronto subway
- Operator: Toronto Transit Commission

History
- Opened: 1954; 72 years ago

Technical
- Track gauge: 4 ft 10 7/8 in (1,495 mm) Toronto gauge
- Electrification: Third rail, 600 V DC

The Davisville Subway Yard is a rail yard on the Toronto Transit Commission's Yonge subway line. The train maintenance and storage building is referred to as the Davisville Carhouse.

== Location ==
The yard is located adjoining the Davisville station, between Eglinton and St. Clair stations. The yard is next to the TTC headquarters in the William McBrien Building at 1900 Yonge Street.

== History ==
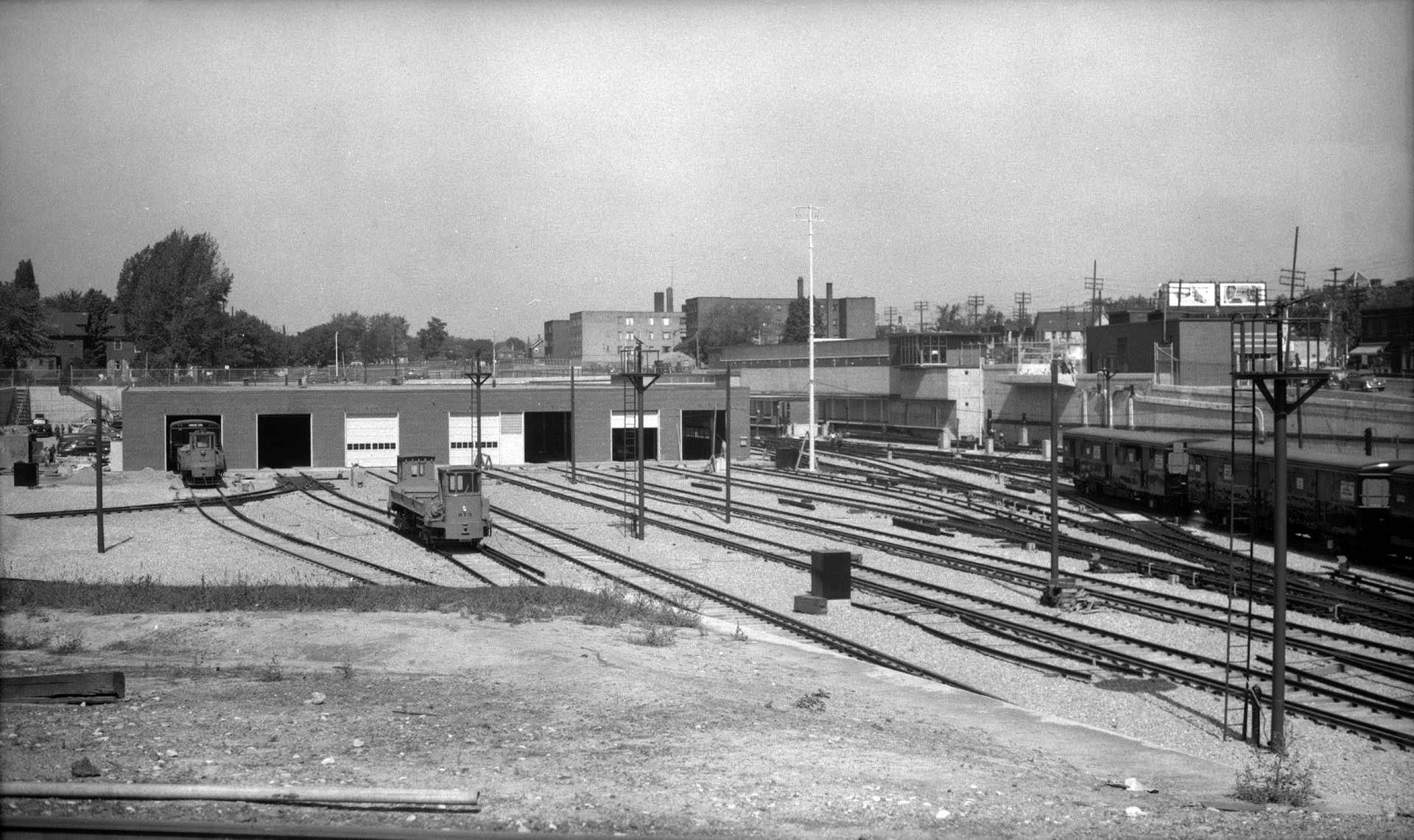
Davisville Yard under construction, c. 1953

Davisville Yard acted as the main maintenance and storage yard for Toronto's Yonge subway, which opened between Union Station and Eglinton Avenue in 1954. The first two subway cars (5000 and 5001) were delivered to the TTC's Hillcrest Complex, but subsequent subway cars were delivered to Davisville yard via the Toronto Belt Line Railway. Before the opening of the subway, there was a temporary interchange track between the Yonge streetcar line and the Davisville Yard on the north side of the Belt Line bridge for the interchange of rail equipment with the streetcar system. In 1953, subway cars 5000 and 5001, after being displayed at the Canadian National Exhibition, were mounted on shop trucks and towed at night over streetcar tracks by a Peter Witt motor to the Davisville Yard via the temporary interchange. (The two subway cars had arrived at the CNE from Hillcrest via the Bathurst streetcar line. At the CNE, the two cars were displayed on their own trucks.)

The Davisville Carhouse could not handle heavy repair work for subway trucks. Thus, until the shops at Greenwood Yard were opened in 1965, trucks needed to be shipped by road to the Hillcrest Complex on a specially built trailer. According to rail historians John F. Bromley and Jack May, this was the reason that the subway was built to the streetcar gauge of 4 ft 10 7/8 in (1,495 mm), the same as the shop tracks at Hillcrest.

There used to be an upper yard with two parallel stub tracks plus a shorter stub siding all running parallel to the former Belt Line Railway line (today the Kay Gardner Beltline Park). Another track, located on an incline, connected the upper and lower yards; today, a short stub siding on the west side of the yard is all that is left of that connecting track. Various pieces of work equipment were stored in the upper yard.

Davisville was Toronto's sole subway yard until 1966, when Greenwood Yard opened. Subway car deliveries were also shifted to Greenwood at this time. While usage of it began to wane, it remained active even as the larger Wilson Yard opened in 1978. The yard became deactivated after 1993, when repairs were required to a retaining wall to the south of the yard. Even after this work was completed, the yard remained inactive as the TTC had become quite satisfied with the temporary storage and maintenance arrangement during the closure. The yard was temporarily reactivated during the 1995 Russell Hill subway accident, and also during the retirement of older rolling stock (H-1/H-2, M-1). The subway yard was formally reactivated in June 2002, a few months prior to the opening of Line 4 Sheppard.

In November 2018, the TTC completed the extension the carhouse over tracks 3 and 4 on the east side of the building. Track 3 is the wash track and track 4 is utilized for interior cleaning and floor washing of the vehicles. Before the extension, tracks 3 and 4 were long enough for only four-car trains within the carhouse building, and the overhead doors on the north and south end had to remain open to service six-car TR trains. The open doors also exposed equipment to freezing in winter. With the extension, the TTC can use tracks 3 and 4 for the overnight storage of six-car TR trains.

== Current operations ==
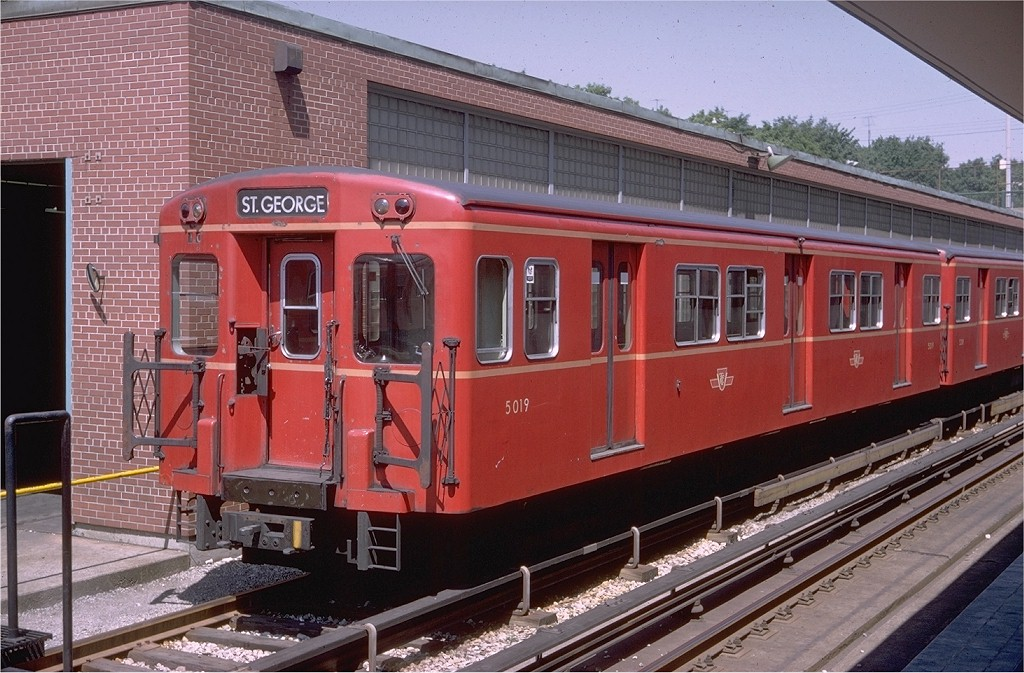
A G-series train at Davisville, c. 1969

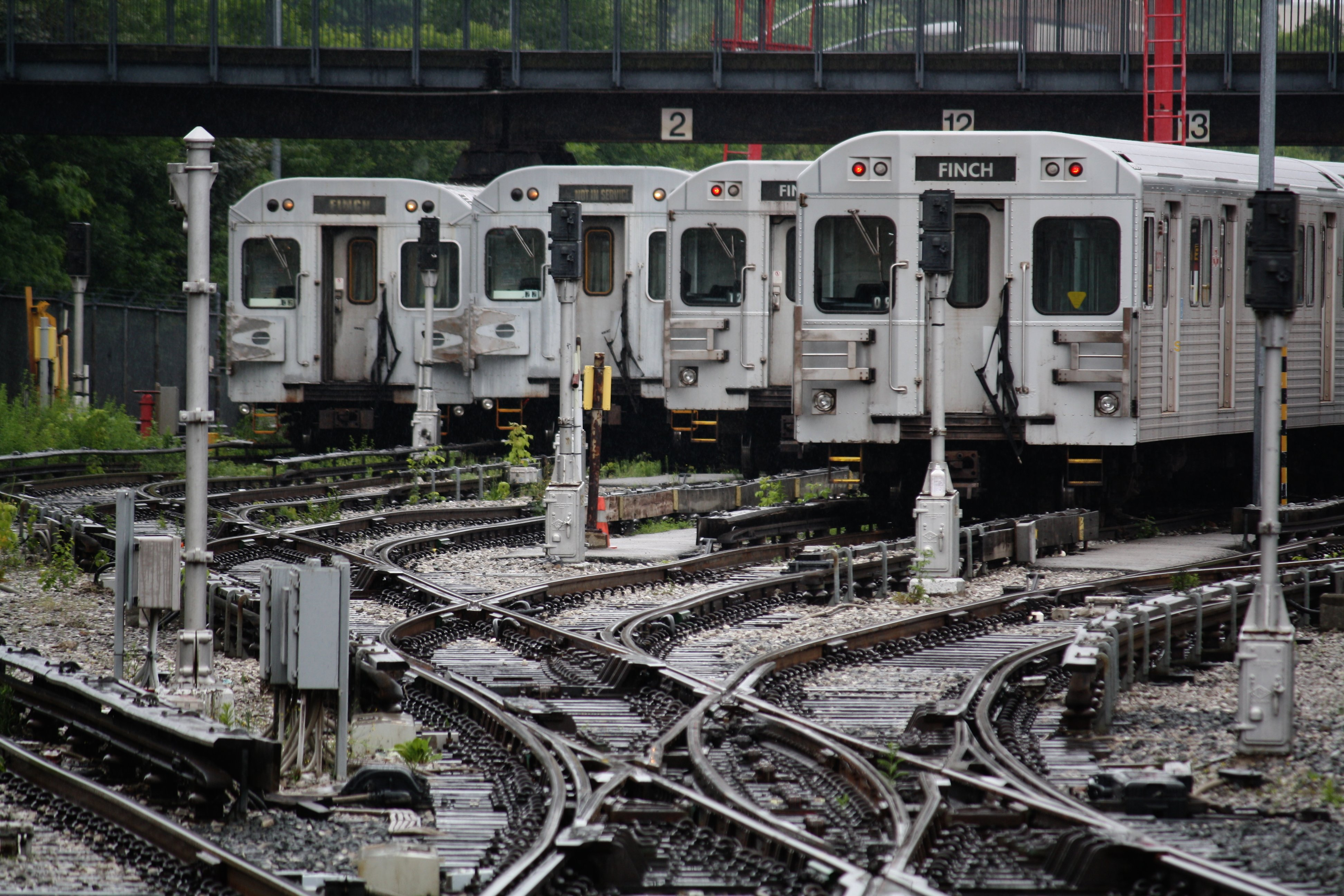
Trains at Davisville yard, seen from Davisville station c. 2009

Davisville Yard is home to a small portion of the TTC's revenue rolling stock of Toronto Rocket subway trains which operate on Line 1 Yonge-University and Line 4 Sheppard and some of the Commission's work cars. The facility is used to store, service and maintain subway cars. The yard can dispatch 12 trains onto Line 1, and this minimizes the need to deadhead trains from the Wilson Yard. In addition to exterior storage tracks, the yard's carhouse has eight tracks to perform safety inspections, unscheduled repairs, floor washing and exterior washing. Many Subway Infrastructure sections including Track, Structures, and Signals are also based at the Davisville Yard.

== Future ==
In 2022, the city of Toronto was studying a proposal to deck over the Davisville Yard in order to build a 1-hectare (2.5-acre) park over the yard. The yard, the adjacent subway station, a substation and signal facility would remain in operation during construction. The city owns the Davisville Yard.
