= Yonge streetcar line =

Overview
- Status: Discontinued
- Locale: Toronto, Ontario, Canada
- First service: 1861
- Last service: 1954
- Successor: Yonge subway line
- Former operators: Toronto Street Railway (1861–1891); Toronto Railway Company (1891–1921); Toronto Transportation Commission (1921–1954); Radial operators: Metropolitan Street Railway (1885–1904); Toronto and York Radial Railway(1904–1922); Hydro-Electric Railways (1922–1927); Toronto Transportation Commission (1927–1948)

Technical
- Track gauge: 4 ft 10 7/8 in (1,495 mm) Toronto gauge

Beginning operation in 1861, the Yonge streetcar line was the first streetcar line in Toronto and the first in Canada. It started off as a horsecar line and closed in 1954 operating two-unit trains of Peter Witt motors pulling a trailer. Under the Toronto Transportation Commission, the Yonge line was the busiest and most congested streetcar line in the city leading to its replacement in 1954 by the Yonge Subway line, also Toronto's first and the first in Canada.

== History ==
=== TSR era (1861–1891) ===
On September 10, 1861, the Yonge streetcar line became the first streetcar line in Canada. It ran from Yorkville Town Hall (north of Bloor Street at Scollard Street and Yonge Street), south on Yonge Street, then east on King Street to St. Lawrence Hall. The Toronto Street Railway operated the line using horsecars.

In 1873, the Toronto Street Railway extended the Yonge streetcar line to Front Street, then west to York Street to serve the Grand Trunk Railway station at Simcoe Street. Yonge streetcars alternated running there and to King and Frederick streets.

In 1885, the Yonge streetcar line was extended north from Scollard Street to the CPR line where there was a wye to reverse the horsecars.

On January 26, 1885, the Metropolitan Street Railway started horsecar service on Yonge Street on the north side of the CPR line to Eglinton Avenue. In 1886, the line was extended by 1.2 kilometres (0.75 mi) to Glengrove Avenue. Unlike the Toronto Street Railway's Yonge line, the Metropolitan line was a single track, side-of-road operation using double-ended horsecars. The northward expansion of the Yonge streetcar line is related to the history of the Metropolitan line.

On September 1, 1890, the Metropolitan line was electrified, preceding the electification of the Yonge streetcar line on the south side of the CPR line. However, the line reverted to horse-drawn buses between October 1890 to May 1891. The faster, heavier electrical trams had damaged the tracks, forcing a rebuild of the line.

=== TRC era (1891–1921) ===
On September 1, 1891, the Toronto Railway Company took over Toronto's horsecar system and began its conversion to electric streetcars.

In 1892, the Metropolitan line was extended to Glen Echo Road, which in 1922 would be near the location of the Yonge streetcar line's Glen Echo Loop.

On October 10, 1892, electrification of the Yonge streetcar line was completed.

On December 2, 1895, the Station Loop was opened to eliminate using a "Y" to reverse streetcars. From Front Street, the loop went south on Simcoe Street, east on Station Street and north on York Street, returning to Front Street east to Yonge Street. On Station Street next to the old Union Station, the loop passed under a covered arch.

In 1897, the Metropolitan Street Railway became the Metropolitan Railway Company because with the extension of the line to Richmond Hill, the Metropolitan evolved from a local streetcar line into an interurban radial line. The smaller streetcar vehicles would be replaced by longer, larger radial cars, which resembled railway carriages with trolley poles, motors and motorman cabs at each end.

On June 25, 1915, a City of Toronto work team ripped up 400 metres (1,300 ft) of the Metropolitan Line along Yonge Street between the CPR line and Farnham Avenue to the north. This was a result of a dispute between the city and the Toronto Railway Company, which owned the Toronto and York Radial Railway, the operator of the Metropolitan radial line since 1904.

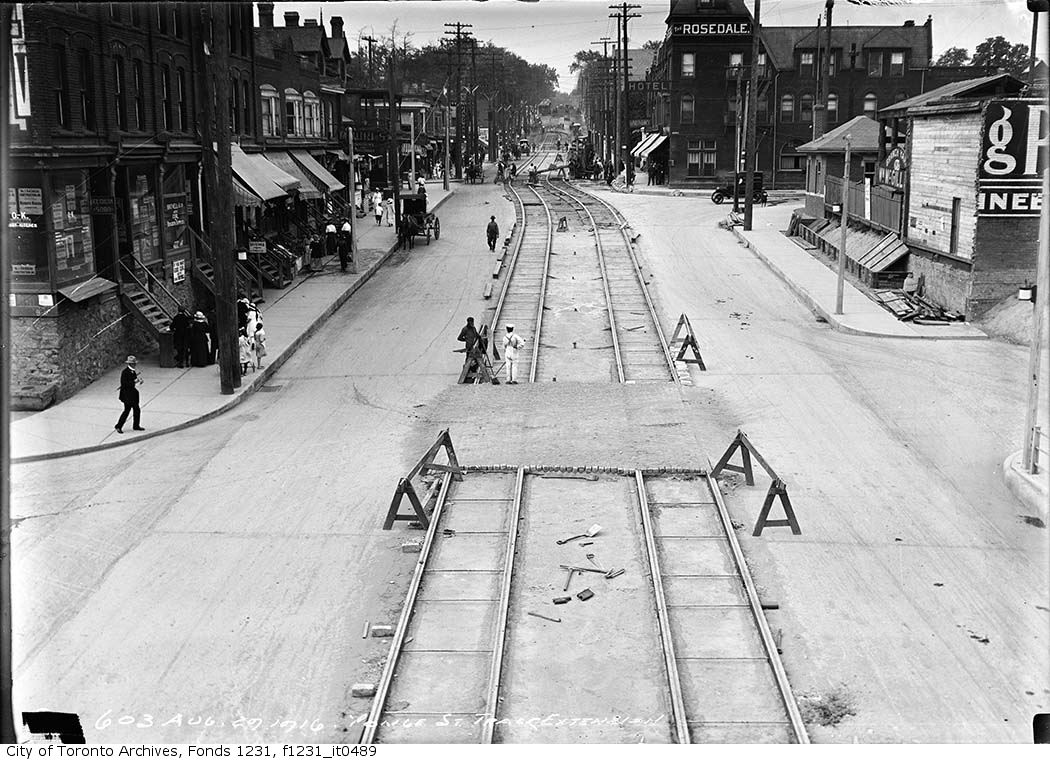
Yonge streetcar extension looking north from the new CPR overpass, 1916

In early 1916, the Toronto Railway Company extended the Yonge streetcar line north from Price Street, under a newly built bridge carrying the CPR line, to Farnham Avenue, where a wye was built. This reduced the gap passengers had to walk in order to transfer between the Yonge streetcar line and the radial line from 400 metres (1,300 ft) to 125 metres (410 ft).

=== TTC era (1921–1954) ===
On September 1, 1921, the Toronto Transportation Commission took over the Toronto streetcar system, including the Yonge streetcar line, from the Toronto Railway Company. Initially, the Yonge line continued to use the former TRC cars.

On December 14, 1921, Peter Witt streetcars began service on the Yonge streetcar line, with trailers being introduced later that month.

On November 2, 1922, the TTC opened the Yonge streetcar line to the city limits at Glen Echo Road. The old single-track Metropolitan line along the west side of Yonge Street from Farnham Avenue was replaced by a new double-track, centre-of-the-road streetcar line. The city had decided that the TTC should be the sole operator of public transit within the city limits, thus, pushing radial operation outside the city limits. Glen Echo Terminal was constructed as the northern terminal of the Yonge streetcar line, as well as a transfer point to the radial cars going further north as far as Sutton near Lake Simcoe until 1930, and later via the North Yonge Railways to Richmond Hill until 1948, when buses replaced radial service.

On December 15, 1922, the Eglinton Carhouse opened at the southwest corner of Eglinton Avenue and Yonge Street. It replaced the Yorkville Carhouse.

On April 1, 1928, Station Loop at Union Station closed. Yonge streetcars then looped via Front, York and Wellington Streets in order to turn north on Yonge Street.

In 1930, the TTC laid tracks along Eglinton Avenue East between Yonge Street and Mount Pleasant Road. This short, infrequently used line linked the Mount Pleasant streetcar line (opened November 4, 1925) to the Eglinton Carhouse. This Eglinton Avenue line closed in 1954.

On September 20, 1930, the Simcoe Loop at the southeast corner of Simcoe and Front streets opened, replacing Station Loop. This became the new southern terminal for the Yonge streetcar.

Beginning in July 1932, ex-TRC cars started to provide night service on the Yonge line.

Beginning in November 1940, PCC cars operating out of the St. Clair Carhouse replaced the ex-TRC cars on night service.

On January 30, 1948, on a trial basis, the TTC fitted trolley shoes to replace trolley wheels for all streetcars on the Yonge route. Previously, all TTC streetcars used trolley wheels at the tip of the trolley pole. The trial, inspired by the performance of shoes on trolley buses, was a success, and shoes (also called carbon slide collectors) were installed in all streetcars in the fleet.

On August 17, 1948, the first of many streetcar diversions began because of work to construct the Yonge subway. In the first diversion, the Yonge streetcar had to jog via Wellington and Bay streets to avoid a track closure at Yonge and Front streets.

On September 5, 1951, the Harbour Yard opened to replace capacity at the Eglinton Carhouse that was lost due to subway construction. The yard was located on the south side of the railway viaduct between Bay and York streets. Streetcars went south on Bay Street from Front Street to access the yard.

On March 7, 1954, the Yonge streetcar line north of Eglinton Avenue was closed to install trolley bus wires to Glen Echo Loop. Trolley bus service on the Yonge route began on March 27, 1954; the unnumbered route was numbered 97 in 1956.

On March 30, 1954, the Yonge streetcar line closed and replaced by the new Yonge subway starting service that day.

== Subway construction ==
Construction of the Yonge subway line started in 1949 and resulted in 28 Yonge streetcar diversions before the subway's opening. Some diversions involved laying temporary streetcar tracks on side streets such as Maitland and Alexander streets so that Yonge cars could divert via Church Street.

The Eglinton Carhouse had to be partially demolished to accommodate the construction of Eglinton subway station. This affected repair bays, forcing the transfer of much of the streetcar maintenance to Russell Carhouse. In 1951, the TTC built the temporary Harbour Yard between Bay and York streets, south of the railway viaduct, to replace capacity lost at the Eglinton Carhouse.

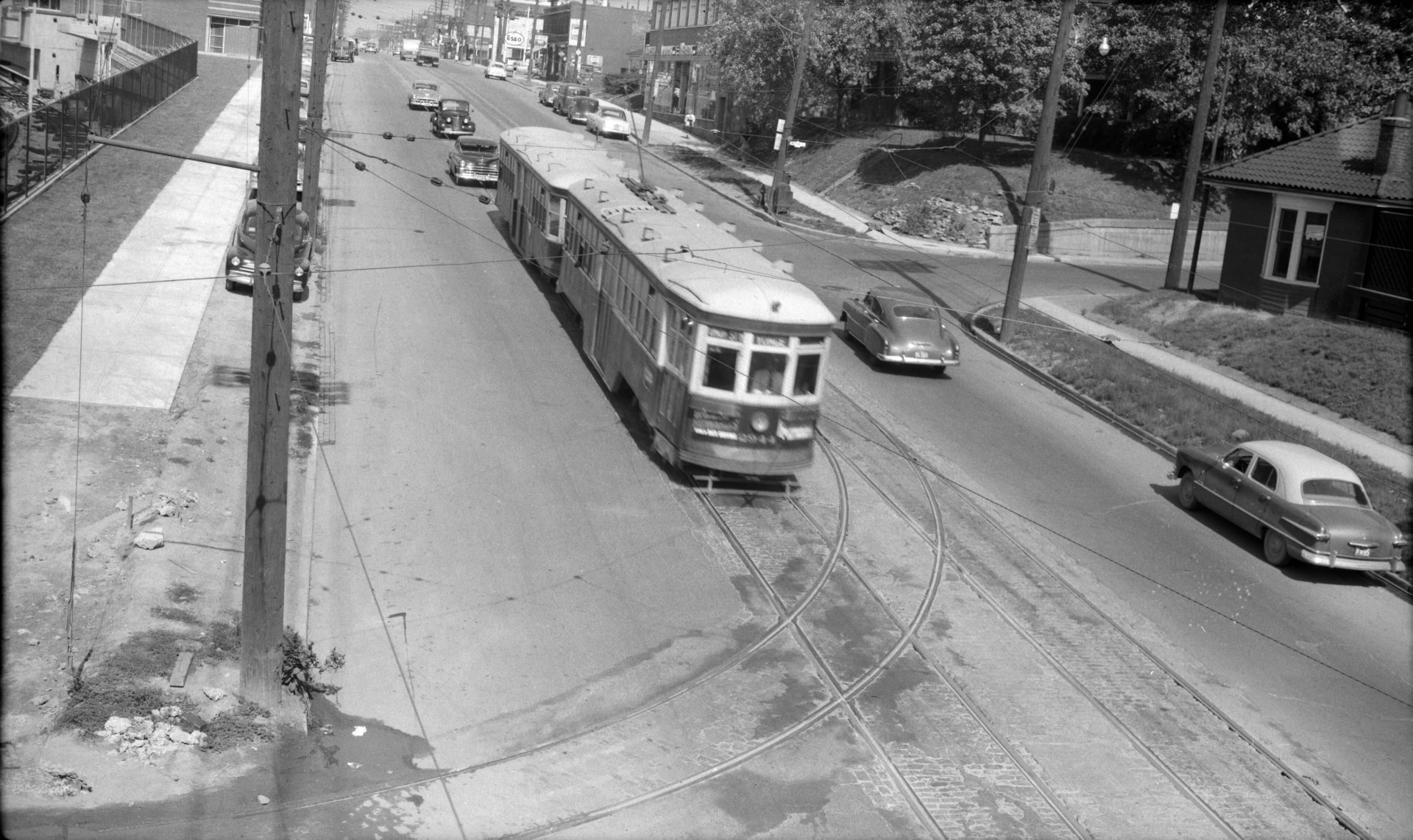
Temporary streetcar/subway interchange to Davisville Yard (left) at Belt Line bridge

Before the subway opening, there was a temporary interchange track between the Yonge streetcar line and the subway line at the Davisville Yard on the north side of the Belt Line bridge. In 1953, subway cars 5000 and 5001, after being displayed at the Canadian National Exhibition, were mounted on shop bogies and towed at night by a Peter Witt motor to the Davisville Yard via the Yonge streetcar line using the temporary interchange. They arrived at the CNE from the Hillcrest Complex via the Bathurst streetcar line. Because of the subway car width, buses had to replace night streetcar service during the movements. At the CNE, the subway cars were displayed on their proper subway bogies.

== Peter Witts on Yonge ==
Trains of Peter Witt motor cars pulling a trailer were the mainstay of the Yonge line under the TTC. The Yonge line used as many as 70 Peter Witt trailer-trains during the rush hours. These trains were operated on a one-minute frequency.

Because of the hill between the CPR overpass and Farnham Avenue, large Peter Witt cars of the 4500 and 4600 series were used.

Two-door trailers were originally put into service, later being replaced with three-door trailers to facilitate passenger entry and exit.

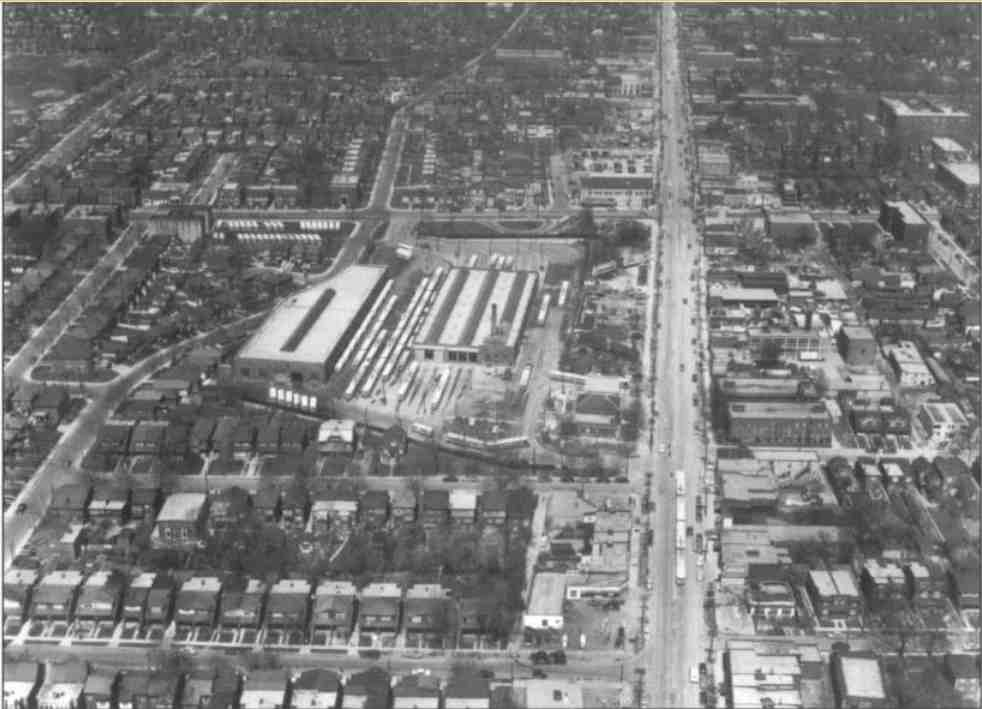
Aerial view of Eglinton Carhouse in 1948

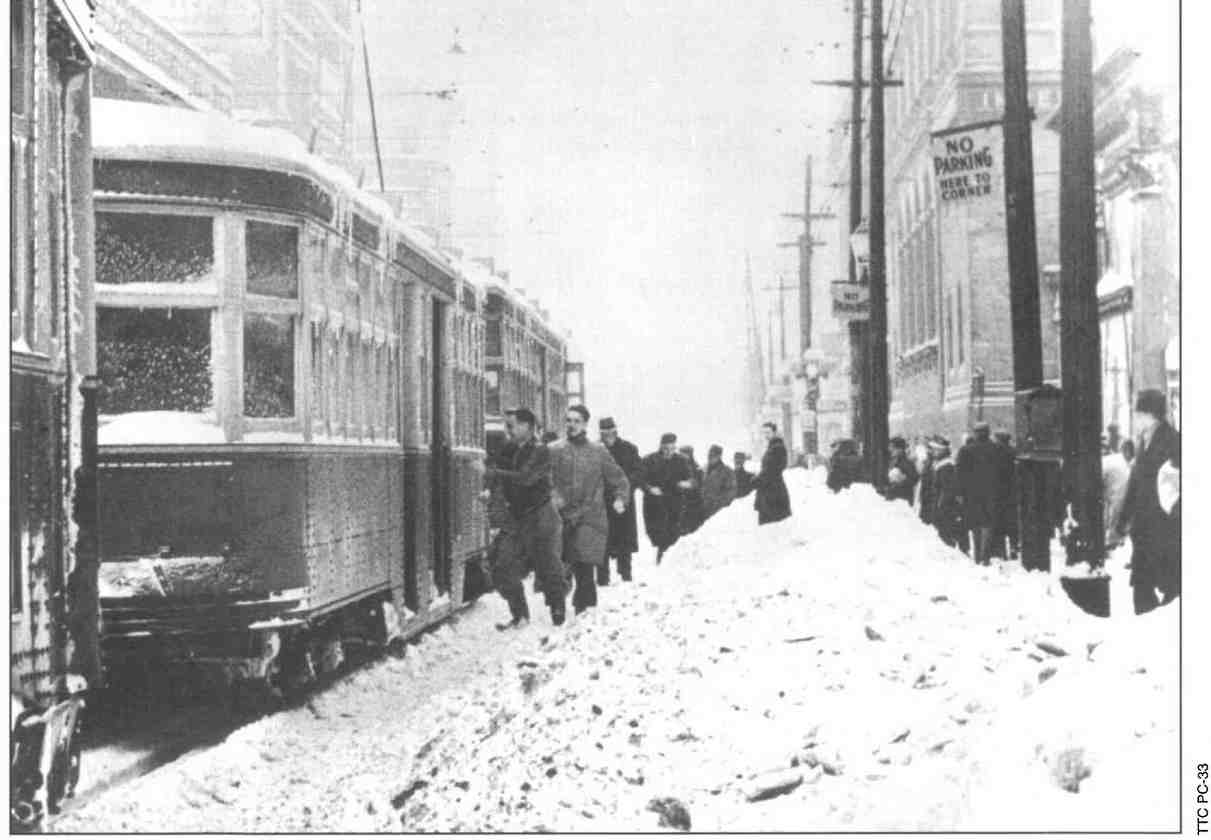
Peter Witt trailer train at Yonge & King
