= Peter Witt (Toronto streetcar) =

TTC version built from 1921 to 1923

Peter Witt car
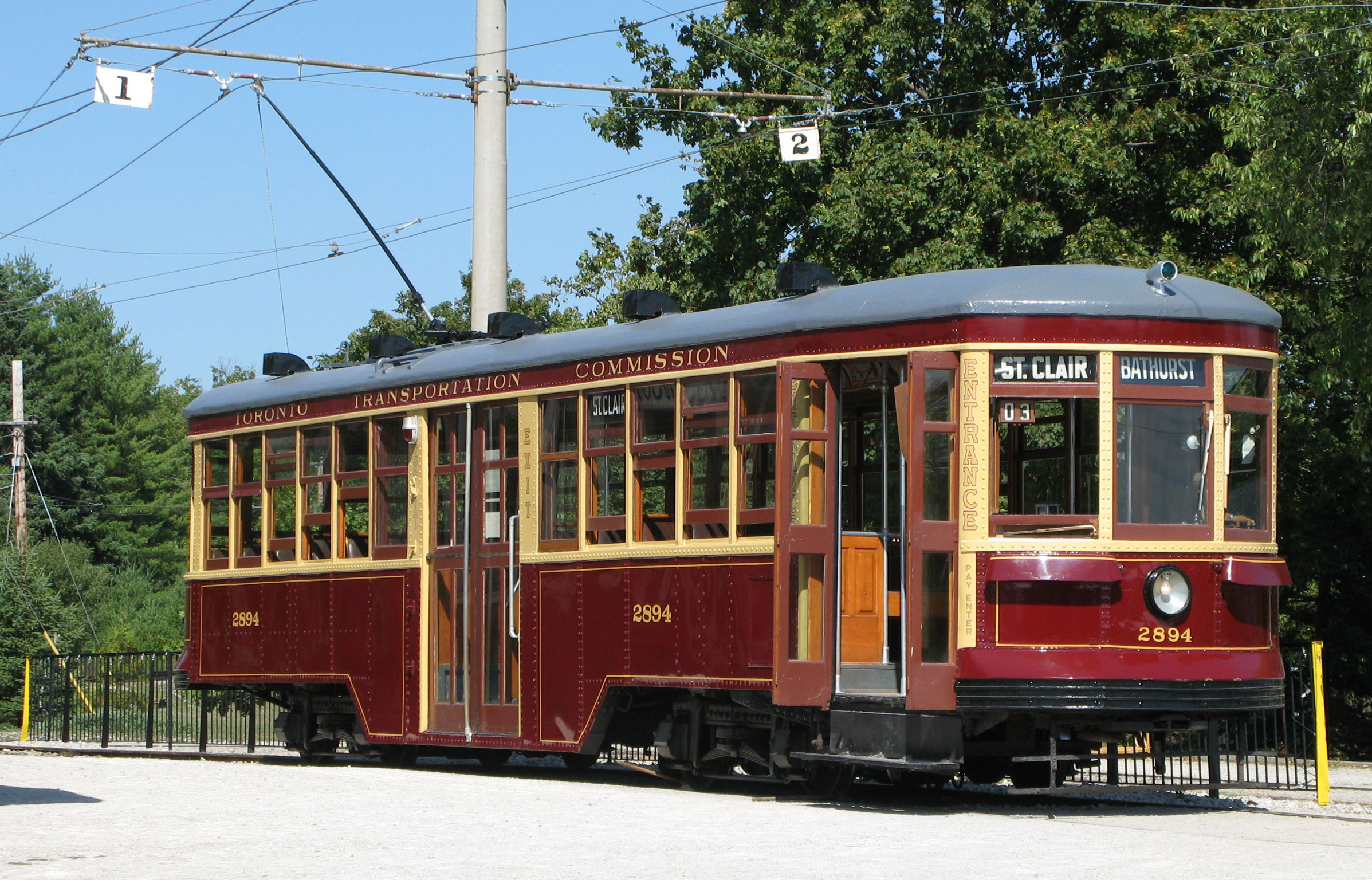
- Small Peter Witt preserved at the Halton County Radial Railway Museum
- Constructed: 1921–1923
- Entered service: 1921
- Number built: 575 (350 motors, 225 trailers)
- Number preserved: 8 in operating condition
- Successor: PCC streetcar
- Operator: Toronto Transportation Commission / Toronto Transit Commission

Specifications
- Car length: Small Witt: 14 m (47 ft); Large Witt: 15.80 m (51 ft 10 in)
- Weight: 32,270 kg (71,150 lb)
- Traction motors: 4
- Power output: Small Witt: 4 × 26 kW (35 hp); Large Witt: 4 × 37 kW (50 hp)
- Wheels driven: 8
- Seating: Small Witt: 55; Large Witt: 60
- Track gauge: 1,495 mm (4 ft 10 7/8 in)

The Toronto version of the Peter Witt streetcar was designed by Peter Witt, a commissioner of the Cleveland Street Railway in the United States. Between 1921 and 1923, the Toronto Transportation Commission ordered a total of 350 Peter Witt motor cars. 225 trailers would be ordered from three companies in Canada: Canada Car and Foundry of Montreal, Ottawa Car Company and Preston Car Company (Brill). The cars were designed for riders to "pay as you enter", and initially used two-person operation.

== Description ==
=== Motor cars ===
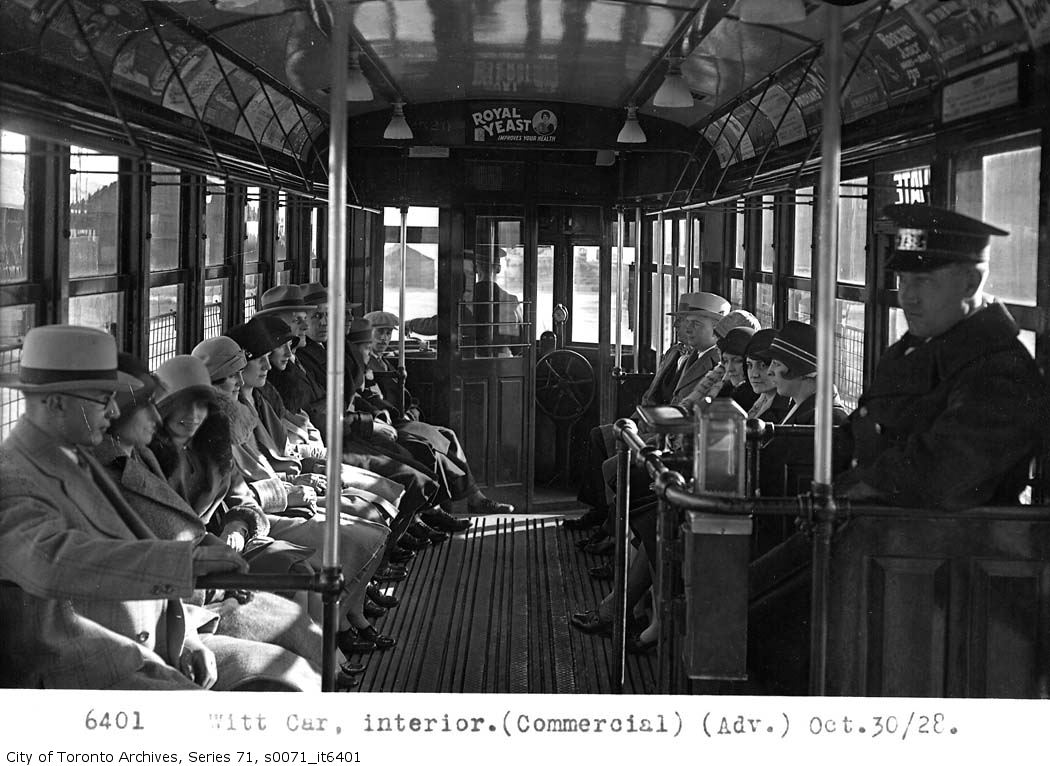
Interior of a Toronto Peter Witt streetcar in 1928. Note the conductor, sitting by the fare box, and the motorman at the front in the enclosed cab.

The Peter Witt streetcars were the first new vehicles ordered by the Toronto Transportation Commission; however, they required a major change in the trackwork before they could run. The new cars were wider than the older TRC cars, and the devilstrip between parallel tracks was too narrow at 1.17 metres (3 ft 10 in). The TTC had to re-lay track throughout the system to widen the devilstrip to 1.63 metres (5 ft 4 in).

The streetcars, the first all-steel streetcars in Toronto, came in two versions: large and small. The large Witts were 15.80 metres (51 ft 10 in) long, had 60 seats and used four 37-kilowatt (50 hp) motors; the small Witts, 14 metres (47 ft) long, 55 seats and four 26-kilowatt (35 hp) motors. The large Witts had a slow speed but the strength to pull a trailer. The small Witts were faster in operation, could move along better in traffic but could not pull a trailer. Trailer-trains were used on heavily travelled routes such as Yonge, Bloor, College and Dundas.

A streetcar received a "Peter Witt" designation if it was built using the Peter Witt fare payment design. With Peter Witt streetcars, passengers enter by the front doors and pay their fare as they walk past the conductor seated just before centre doors. Passengers must pay their fare when they pass the conductor either to exit the car by the centre doors or to access the rear of the car. This scheme was dubbed "pay-as-you-pass". Passengers could ride in the unpaid front portion of the car or in the paid rear portion. During the Great Depression, to cut costs, many Witt cars were converted to one-person operation, eliminating the conductor's position and relocating the fare box at the car's entrance.

Originally, all but the class P small Witt vehicles had a fully enclosed operator cab. (This feature would not be repeated in Toronto until the introduction of the Flexity Outlook in 2014.) Around 1940, the cab walls were removed.

Air brakes were the normal means used to stop the motor car. If these brakes failed, the motorman could throw the motors into reverse as a last resort, but this caused wear to the motors. There was a handwheel in the cab to set the parking brakes which could also be used if the main brakes failed.

Initially, the motor cars had wooden floors and seats. Later, these were converted to linoleum floors and upholstered seats. For heating, the motor cars initially had a coal stove which could be removed in warmer months to provide more seating space. The stoves were later replaced by forced-air heaters.

In early 1928, the TTC modified Peter Witt cars 2500–2522 for radial service on the Lake Simcoe line (the former Metropolitan line of the Toronto and York Radial Railway). These cars were fitted with air whistles, large-flange wheels, and flag- and marker-light brackets. They were mainly used to handle heavy crowds from Glen Echo to Bond Lake. However, on one occasion, some of these Peter Witt cars went all the way to Sutton to accommodate an Orangemen's picnic.

=== Trailers ===
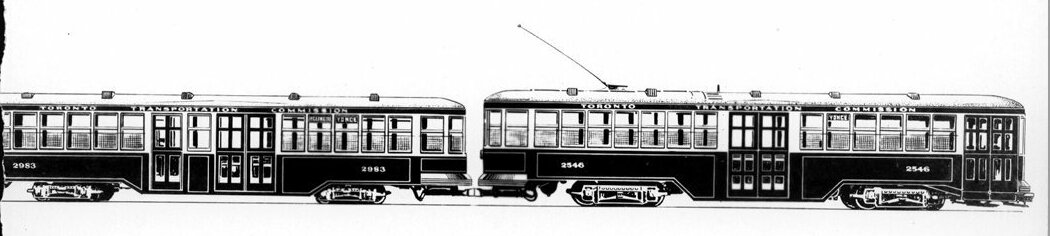
Large Peter Witt pulling a three-door trailer

The "Peter Witt" trailers were not of the Peter Witt design because of their door arrangement. The class N trailers had two narrow centre doors flanking the conductor's position and were slow to load and unload. Thus, the three-door class Q trailers (also known as Harvey trailers) were introduced with a double door on the right side of the conductor's position and a single, narrow door on the other side. One of the doors on the right side had a gate so that the conductor could set it as either an entry or exit door. (The "Harvey" trailers were named after D. W. Harvey, who would become TTC general manager.)

Initially, riders avoided trailers because TTC crews might uncouple the trailer to put it out of service while the motor car continued onward. Thus, the TTC would post a sign on the motor car to indicate that the trailer had the same destination as the motor car. Tomlinson couplers were used to couple the front of a trailer to the rear of a large Witt. The coupler allowed the motor car to supply the trailer electricity for lighting and air to operate the trailer's door and brakes. The trailer conductor's stand had a signal light to indicate when the motor car was ready to go.

The TTC added a Tomlinson coupler to the rear of some of its class C, ex-TRC streetcars. These wood-body motor cars could pull a slightly longer, steel-body class N or Q trailer, which in later years could be semi-permanently attached together. The class C cars were retired in 1949, and the trailers were then reassigned.

Because trailers had no motors or power sources, the TTC employed special shunters to move trailers into position within yards. The shunters were essentially a box cab mounted on a single four-wheel truck. Each had a hand brake and either a bow collector or pantograph on the cab roof. It towed a trailer using a drawbar connected to the rear of the trailer.

== Decline in use ==
The first major retirement of the Peter Witt streetcars came in 1938 with the introduction of PCC streetcars. All 60 two-door class N trailers and 30 of the three-door class Q trailers were withdrawn, with PCCs replacing Peter Witt trailer-trains on the Bloor and Dundas streetcar routes. These were the first of the trailers purchased by the TTC to be scrapped after only 15 to 17 years of service.

The next major retirement came on March 30, 1954, with the opening of the Yonge subway (today a part of Line 1 Yonge–University). All the remaining trailers and all of the large Peter Witt cars were retired. The subway replaced the Yonge streetcar line, which had made heavy use of Witt trailer-trains.

With the opening of the University extension of the Yonge subway line on February 28, 1963, the Bay streetcar line (Dupont route) was closed, becoming the last route with regular Peter Witt service. Until March 7, 1963, Witts were used to handle streetcar shortages on a few routes. On April 24, 1963, a few Witt cars were pressed back into service to handle crowds for a baseball game at Maple Leaf Stadium. Thereafter, several Witts were retained as spares until their official retirement on January 1, 1965.

== Fleet ==
Fleet numbers	Builder	Year(s)	No.	Class		Type	Retired
Fleet numbers	Builder	Year(s)	No.	1921	1925	Type	Retired
2300–2498 (even)	CC&F	1921	100	A	K	Large Witt	1954
2500–2578 (even)	CC&F	1921	40	B	L-1	Large Witt	1954
2580–2678 (even)	Brill	1922	50	C	M	Large Witt	1954
2700–2798 (even)	CC&F	1922–23	50	E	P-1	Small Witt	1965?
2800–2898 (even)	Ottawa	1923	50	G	P-2	Small Witt	1965
2900–3018 (even)	CC&F	1923	60	H	L-2	Large Witt	1954
2301–2419 (odd)	CC&F	1921	60	D	N	2-door trailer	1938
2701–3029 (odd)	CC&F	1923	165	F	Q	3-door ("Harvey") trailer	1954

Manufacturers
Abbr	Name	Location	Notes
CC&F	Canada Car and Foundry	Montreal, Quebec	
Ottawa	Ottawa Car Company	Ottawa, Ontario	
Brill	Preston Car Company	Preston, Ontario	Acquired by J. G. Brill Company

== Preservation ==
The following is the list of preserved TTC Peter Witt cars:

Class	Description	Car number	Location
K	Large Peter Witt	2300	Canadian Railway Museum, Saint-Constant, Quebec
K	Large Peter Witt	2424	Halton County Radial Railway, Milton, Ontario
P-1	Small Peter Witt	2766	Toronto Transit Commission; used for special events
P-1	Small Peter Witt	2778	Northern Ohio Railway Museum, Chippewa Lake, Ohio
P-1	Small Peter Witt	2786	Halton County Radial Railway
P-2	Small Peter Witt	2890	Seashore Trolley Museum, Kennebunkport, Maine
P-2	Small Peter Witt	2894	Halton County Radial Railway
P-2	Small Peter Witt	2898	Shore Line Trolley Museum, East Haven, Connecticut
L-2	Large Peter Witt	2984	Halton County Radial Railway (body only)
N	2-door trailer	2395	Halton County Radial Railway (body only)

=== 2766 ===
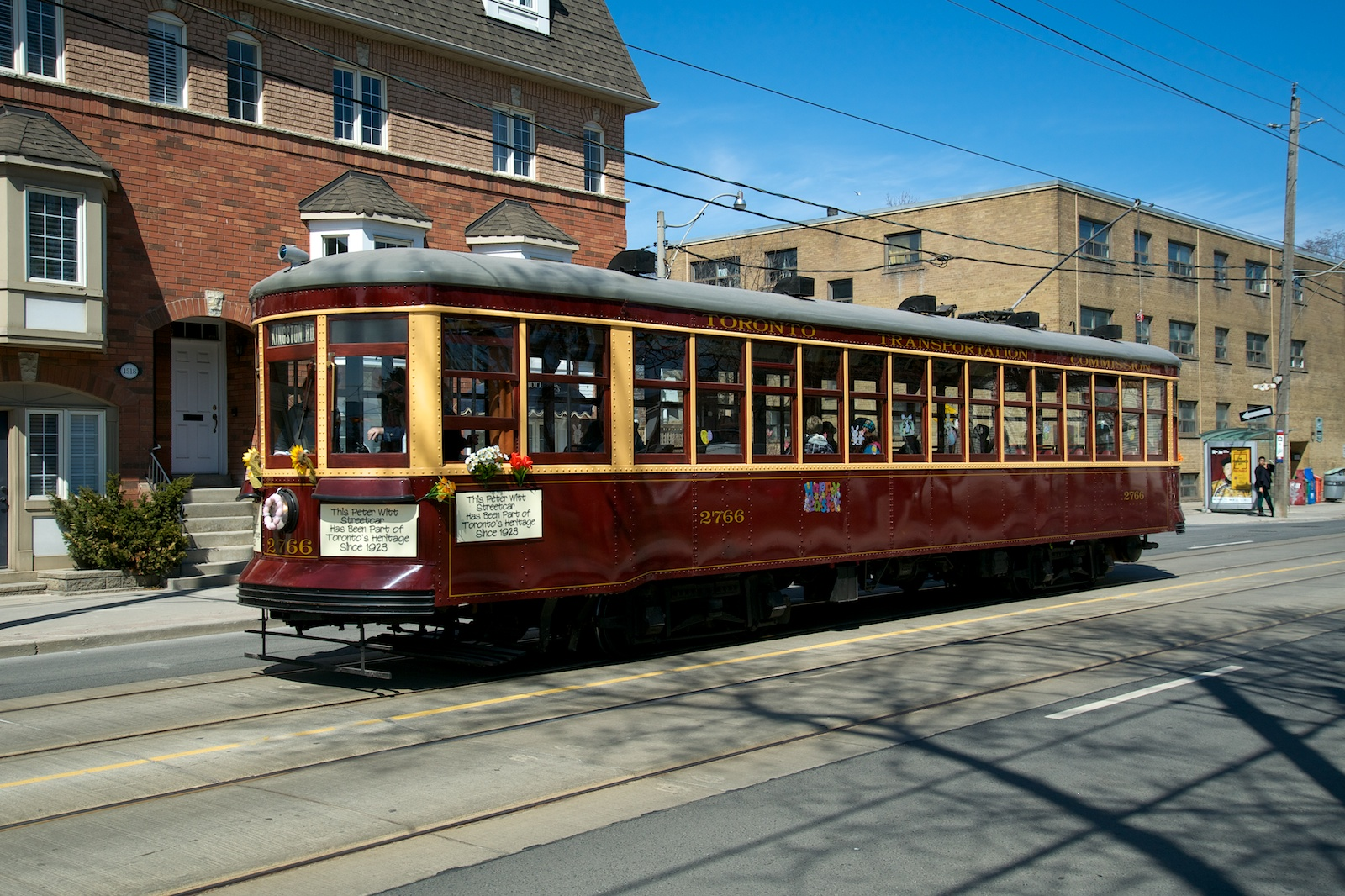
Peter Witt 2766 decorated for the annual Easter Parade in 2014

Between 1973 and 1975, the TTC operated small Peter Witt 2766 as part of the Belt Line Tour Tram. This service was discontinued due to a lack of ridership. It was later used for other sightseeing operations.

Between 1983 and 1988, a tour organization, Toronto Tours, chartered car 2766 from the Toronto Transit Commission and operated a tour service in downtown Toronto. This service also used large Peter Witt 2424, owned by the Ontario Electric Railway Historical Association (OERHA), the operator of the Halton County Radial Railway (HCRR), an operating museum. The tour service terminated after the 1988 season because of the worsening condition of the cars and the difficulty the TTC faced in obtaining parts. In 1989, the TTC rebuilt car 2424 and returned it to the HCRR.

In 2001, the Toronto Transit Commission budgeted $100,000 to have car 2766 restored to operating condition. However, despite this restoration, the TTC planned to restrict car 2766 for special events and not allow its use for charter or tour service. However, there was apparently an exception to the ban on charters. Two charters in 2004 and 2006 had a convoy of a PCC, Witt 2766 and a CLRV. A photo from the 2006 charter showed 2766 positioned between the two more modern cars.

The Witt car is equipped with only one braking system, unlike the PCC, CLRV and ALRV, which have fail-safe air brake, back-up electric and track braking systems. The Witt uses an air-applied tread brake with an emergency stopping distance about 60 percent longer than that of a CLRV. If the Witt's air system fails, the car might have no brakes. Also, Witt operators must manage its current control system; otherwise, if an inadequately trained operator accelerates the car too quickly, a fire or electrical injury to the operator might occur.

=== Other relics ===
In 2019, the shell of large Witt car 2500 was found abandoned at Haliburton Scout Reserve. It was probably once used for accommodation after its retirement in 1954. Photos show it missing windows and much of its roof.

== See also ==
- Toronto streetcar system rolling stock
- TTC Belt Line tour
