= Toronto-gauge railways =

Railway track gauge (1495 mm)

Toronto-gauge railways are streetcar and rapid transit lines built to Toronto gauge, a broad gauge of 1,495 mm (4 ft 10 7/8 in). This is 60 mm (2 3/8 in) wider than standard gauge of 1,435 mm (4 ft 8 1/2 in). The gauge is unique to the Greater Toronto Area and is currently used on the Toronto streetcar system and the three heavy-rail lines of the Toronto subway system, both operated by the Toronto Transit Commission. Several now-defunct interurban rail systems (called radial railways in southern Ontario) also once used this gauge. The Halton County Radial Railway, a transport museum is located on one of the former interurban lines and uses the Toronto gauge.

The unique gauge has remained to this day because it is easier to adapt new rail vehicles to fit the gauge than to convert the entire system to standard gauge. An alternate name for Toronto gauge is TTC gauge, named after the Toronto Transit Commission, the only operator currently using the gauge although the gauge existed prior to the creation of the TTC in 1921.

== Streetcar usage ==
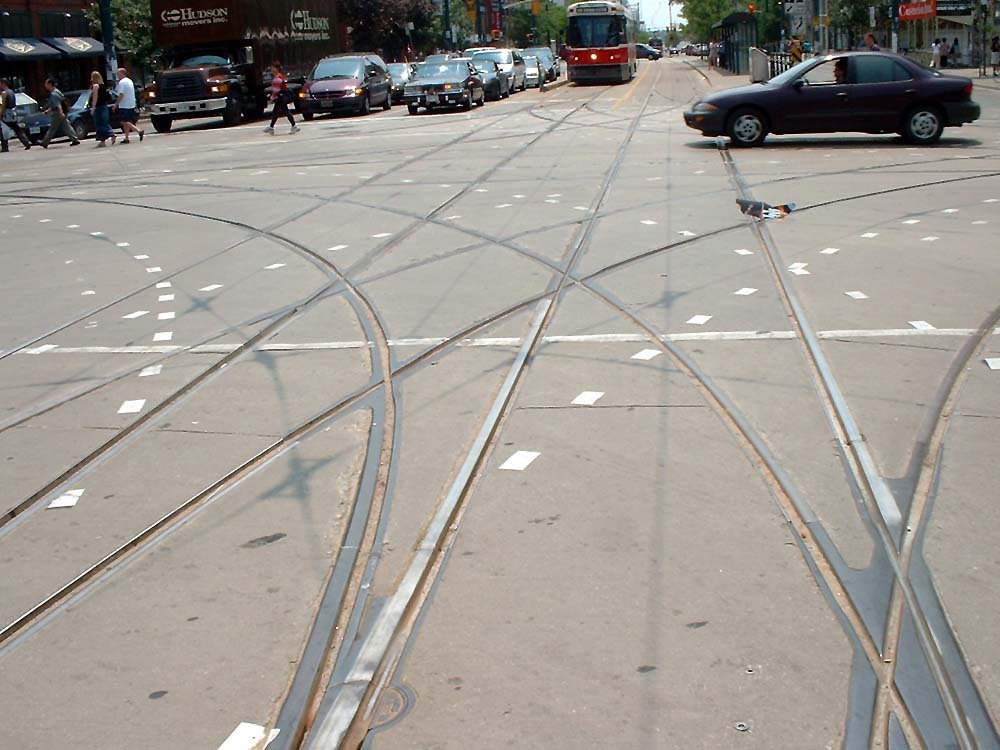
A grand union at a streetcar intersection; Toronto has three grand unions, such as this one at Spadina Avenue and Queen Street West

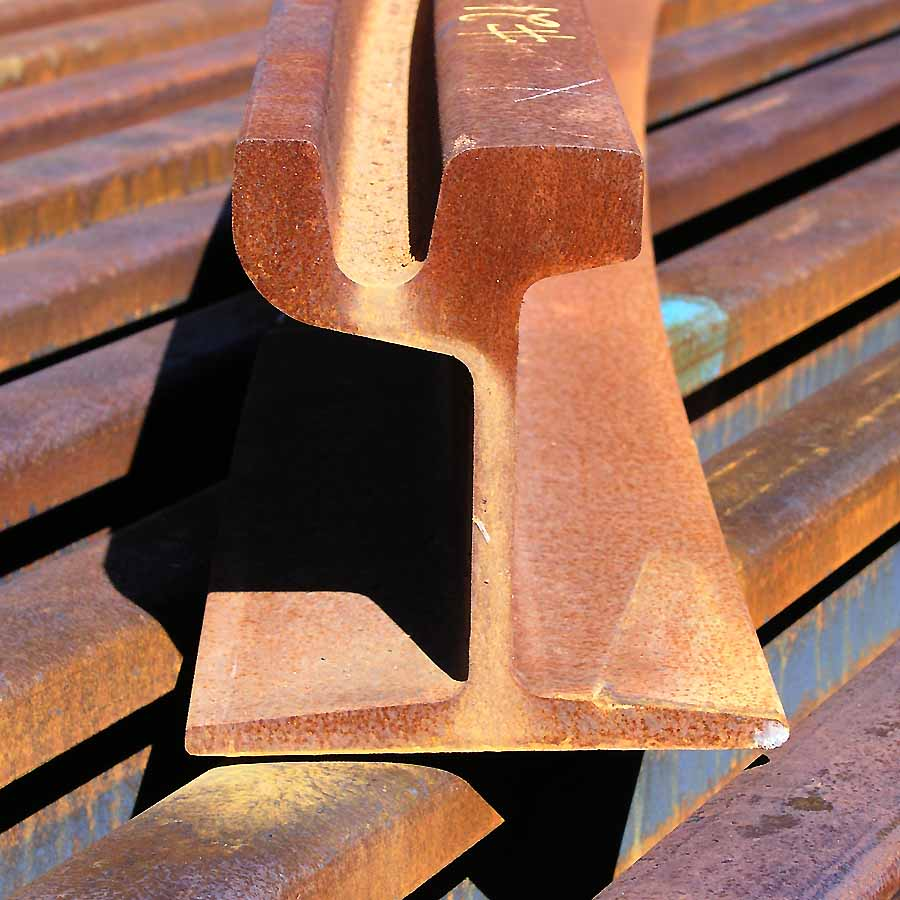
A flange rail, which is typical of Toronto streetcar lines.

All TTC streetcar routes, both past and present, have used the Toronto gauge. The TTC had three predecessor companies that also used Toronto gauge, each with a network of streetcar lines within the City of Toronto:

- Toronto Street Railway (1861–1891)
- Toronto Railway Company (1891–1921)
- Toronto Civic Railways (1911–1921)

The Toronto Street Railway created the Toronto streetcar system opening its first horsecar line in 1861. It also created the broad Toronto gauge to allow horse-drawn wagons and carriages to use the inside of the rail for a smoother ride through muddy, unpaved streets. The gauge also had the effect of precluding the movement of standard-gauge freight cars along streetcar lines. When its franchise ended in 1891, the Toronto Railway Company (TRC) took over the system and replaced horse-drawn streetcars with electric trams; it continued the use of Toronto gauge. Because the TRC refused to service neighbouring areas annexed by the City of Toronto, the City created the Toronto Civic Railways (TCR) in 1911 to serve those areas. TCR lines, clustered in the west end, east end and mid-town, were not interconnected. To move streetcars between carhouses, the TCR used the tracks of the TRC, which is one reason that the City chose Toronto gauge for the TCR. The other reason is that when the TRC franchise ended in 1921, the City wanted to merge the two systems. There were no permanent links between the tracks of the TCR and TRC; temporary track was laid at night when the TCR needed to transfer streetcars. When the TRC franchise ended in 1921, the TTC acquired both the TRC and the TCR and amalgamated the two systems, permanently linking their tracks.

=== Explanations for the gauge ===
Toronto gauge was first used for the horsecar system opened by the Toronto Street Railway in 1861. Two explanations are offered for the width of the gauge:

1. The gauge would make it impossible for the steam railways to use city tracks, and
2. The track would support the wheels of non-rail carriages and wagons, allowing such vehicles to handle muddy conditions that made roads impassable. According to transit advocate Steve Munro, "TTC gauge is English carriage gauge".

According to the TTC, advocating the first explanation, the City of Toronto feared that the street railway franchise operator would allow the operation of steam locomotives and freight trains through city streets, as was common practice in Hamilton, Ontario (until the 1950s) and in many US cities, such as New York City and Syracuse, New York.

However, fear of freight trains invading the streets was from the era of about 1891 to 1921, over 30 years after the creation of Toronto gauge, which makes it an unlikely reason for the Toronto gauge. During this era, railway entrepreneurs William Mackenzie and Donald Mann controlled the Canadian Northern Railway, the Toronto Railway Company plus several radial railway lines including the Toronto Suburban Railway. About 1912, the Toronto Suburban wanted to convert its system from Toronto gauge to standard gauge, but the City of Toronto obtained a court injunction blocking the re-gauging over fears of freight cars in the streets. The railway, however, prevailed and the system was converted to standard gauge in 1917.

Also, horsecar tracks could be of very light construction, adequate for horse-drawn trams, but unsuitable for heavier vehicles. When the Metropolitan Street Railway converted its streetcar line in North Toronto from horse to electric operation, the faster heavier electric trams damaged the horsecar rails, which required the line to be shut down and the track rebuilt to a higher standard.

In support of the second explanation, the 1861 agreement between the City of Toronto and the Toronto Street Railway stated:

That the gauge of the said railways shall be such that the ordinary vehicles now in use may travel on the said tracks, and that it shall and may be lawful to and for all and every person and persons whatsoever to travel upon and use the said tracks with their vehicles loaded or empty, when and so often as they may please, provided they do not impede or interfere with the cars of the party of the second part (Toronto Street Railway), running thereon, and subject at all times to the right of the said party of the second part, his executors, and administrators and assigns to keep the said tracks with his and their cars, when meeting or overtaking any other vehicle thereon.

As wagons were normally built at standard gauge, the streetcar rails were selected to be slightly wider, which allowed the wagons to ride on the inside sections of the rail and the streetcars on the outside. The Williams Omnibus Bus Line changed the gauge of its buses in 1861 to fit this gauge. At the time, track for horsecars was not the modern 'T' rail was but wide and flat, with a raised section on the outside of the rail.

=== Variations in Toronto gauge ===
Before TTC ownership, however, the streetcar gauge was 1,492 mm (4 ft 10 3/4 in) or 1,499 mm (4 ft 11 in), depending on the historical source, instead of today's 1,495 mm (4 ft 10 7/8 in).

When the Toronto Street Railway opened its first horse-drawn streetcar line in 1861, it used a variation of Toronto gauge, a width of 1,499 mm (4 ft 11 in). When the Toronto Railway Company took over the streetcar system in 1891, its charter stipulated a gauge of 1,499 mm (4 ft 11 in) When the TTC took over streetcar operation in 1921, it set the Toronto gauge at the present day's width.

However, Ken Heard, Consultant Museologist, Canadian Museums Association, was reported to say: "One of the terms of these agreements was that the track gauge was to accommodate wagons. As horse car rail was step rail, the horse cars, equipped with iron wheels with flanges on the inside, ran on the outer, or upper step of the rail. Wagon wheels naturally did not have a flange. They were made of wood, with an iron tire. Wagons would use the inner, or lower step of the rail. The upper step of the rail guided the wagons on the track. In order to accommodate this arrangement, the track gauge had to be 4 feet, 11 inches. As the streets themselves were not paved, this arrangement permitted wagons carrying heavy loads a stable roadbed." In support of Heard's statement about the pre-TTC gauge, the Charter of the Toronto Railway Company said "the gauge of system (4 ft. 11 in.) is to be maintained on main lines and extensions thereof".

According to Raymond L. Kennedy said: "The street railways were built to the horse car gauge of 4 feet 10 and 3/4 inches. (The TTC changed this to 4 10 7/8 and is still in use today even on the subway. [sic])" James V. Salmon said the "city gauge was 4 ft 10 3/4." Both these sources were describing a former streetcar junction at the intersection of Dundas and Keele Streets laid entirely to Toronto streetcar gauge until August 1912. The junction was used by both the Toronto Suburban Railway and the Toronto Railway Company.

== Subway usage ==
=== Heavy rail ===
All three heavy-rail subway lines in Toronto use Toronto gauge. They are:

- Line 1 Yonge–University
- Line 2 Bloor–Danforth
- Line 4 Sheppard

Some early subway proposals involved using streetcars at least partially in tunnels so that using the same gauge would be advantageous, but the idea was ultimately dropped in favour of dedicated rapid transit trains. Nonetheless, the heavy-rail lines use the streetcar gauge today. According to rail historians John F. Bromley and Jack May, the reason that the Yonge subway line was built to the streetcar gauge (Toronto gauge) was that between 1954 and 1965, subway bogies were maintained at the Hillcrest Complex, where the streetcar gauge is used for shop tracks. The Davisville Carhouse was not equipped to perform such heavy maintenance, and the bogies would be loaded onto a specially built track trailer for shipment between Davisville and Hillcrest. This practice stopped with the opening of the shops at Greenwood Yard in 1965.

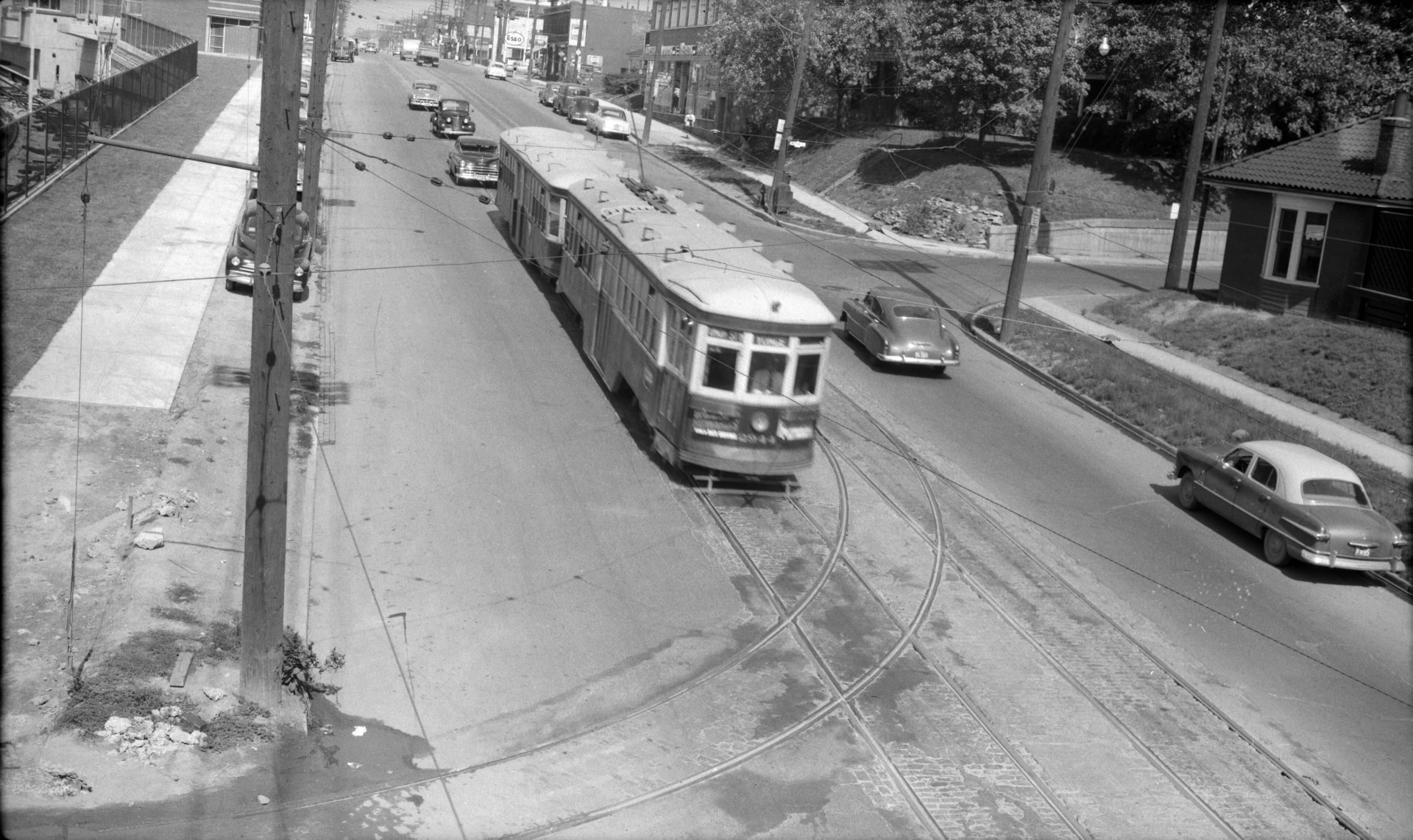
Temporary streetcar/subway interchange to Davisville Yard (left) at Belt Line bridge

Using Toronto gauge for the Yonge subway line had secondary benefits. A number of ex-streetcar vehicles were used as work trains for the subway, taking advantage of the common gauge. Before the opening of the Yonge subway in 1954, there was also a temporary interchange track between the Yonge streetcar line and the Davisville Yard on the north side of the Belt Line bridge. In 1953, subway cars 5000 and 5001, after being displayed at the Canadian National Exhibition, were mounted on shop bogies and towed at night by a Peter Witt motor to the Davisville Yard via the Yonge streetcar line using the temporary interchange. (They arrived at the CNE from the Hillcrest Complex via the Bathurst streetcar line. Because of the subway car width, buses had to replace night streetcar service during the movements. At the CNE, the subway cars were displayed on their proper subway bogies.)

=== Standard-gauge lines ===
In addition to the heavy rail lines, there were and will be light metro and light rail lines that are considered to be part of the Toronto subway system but use the 1,435 mm (4 ft 8 1/2 in) standard gauge that is the usual track gauge in Canada:

- Line 3 Scarborough was a light metro using Intermediate Capacity Transit System technology that is incompatible with running on heavy rail lines, thus making customization for Toronto gauge of no benefit. However, when its ICTS vehicles needed anything more than basic service (which can be carried out at the McCowan Yard), they were carried by truck to the Greenwood Subway Yard.
- Line 5 Eglinton and Line 6 Finch West are light-rail lines not customized to use Toronto gauge to ensure a better price for purchasing vehicles and to have a degree of commonality with similar projects within Ontario.
- The Ontario Line is an under-construction light metro line that will be a standalone line from the heavy rail lines and will use lighter and shorter driverless trains with automatic train control (ATC) manufactured by Hitachi Rail.

=== Hamilton ===
In 2009, the City of Hamilton Public Works produced an analysis for a future light rail line in Hamilton. The analysis looked at whether the city should use standard gauge or "TTC gauge". The report said the benefit in using the Toronto gauge would be to save costs if Hamilton's order could be combined with Toronto's for light-rail vehicles, and to encourage their manufacture in the Greater Toronto Area. The benefit of standard gauge would be greater compatibility with other tram systems and the elimination of the costs to customize the bogies. This analysis occurred before Metrolinx took over the project and stipulated the use of standard gauge.

== Radial railways ==
Radial railways were Interurban tram lines serving communities just beyond the then-city limits. These interurban lines were called "radials" in southern Ontario as they radiated from a city. By the early twentieth century, there were two radial systems operating from the City of Toronto:

- Toronto and York Radial Railway
- Toronto Suburban Railway

Most of the radials within the above two systems used Toronto gauge at some time during their existence. The following sections give a highly abridged summary of each line, focusing mainly on the gauge used. Click on links for a more extensive history.

=== Toronto and York Radial Railway ===
By 1904, the T&YRR had acquired the following independent radial railways:

- Metropolitan Street Railway (Toronto): Metropolitan (later Lake Simcoe) line
- Toronto and Scarboro' Electric Railway, Light and Power Company: Scarboro line
- Toronto and Mimico Electric Railway and Light Company: Mimico (later Port Credit) line

In 1922, the City of Toronto acquired the assets of the T&YRR, and contracted with the Hydro-Electric Railways to operate the radial lines on behalf of the City. However, ridership declined and the City suffered operating losses.

In 1927, the TTC took over all the above radial operations, converting standard gauge lines to Toronto gauge, and connecting the radial tracks to the streetcar system. The City had hoped for efficiencies by not duplicating carhouses and shops.

==== Metropolitan Street Railway ====
The Metropolitan line of the Metropolitan Street Railway opened in 1885 as a horsecar line that used Toronto gauge. Initially, it ran along Yonge Street from the Canadian Pacific Railway mid-town line to Eglinton Avenue. At that time, the area was outside of the City of Toronto. By 1891, the line was electrified. In 1895, the Province granted the Metropolitan the right to change its gauge, which it did to standard gauge allowing for freight car interchange with steam railways. By that time the Metropolitan had reached Richmond Hill. As a standard-gauge line, the Metropolitan was eventually extended to Sutton, along the way connecting to the standard-gauge Schomberg and Aurora Railway, a steam railway converted by the T&YRR into an electric radial line.

In 1927, the TTC took over operation of the Metropolitan line, renaming it as the Lake Simcoe line. At that time the Metropolitan line had extended from Glen Echo Road in Toronto to Sutton. The connecting Schomberg and Aurora Railway was closed. The TTC re-gauged the tracks of the Lake Simcoe line to Toronto gauge within a seven day period, and connected them to the Yonge streetcar line. It closed the Glen Echo carhouse and moved operations to Eglinton Carhouse along the Yonge streetcar line. After re-gauging, box motors serving the Lake Simcoe line carried less-than-carload freight to downtown Toronto. Some city streetcars were modified for radial use to handle crowds to Bond Lake, an amusement park adjacent to the line.

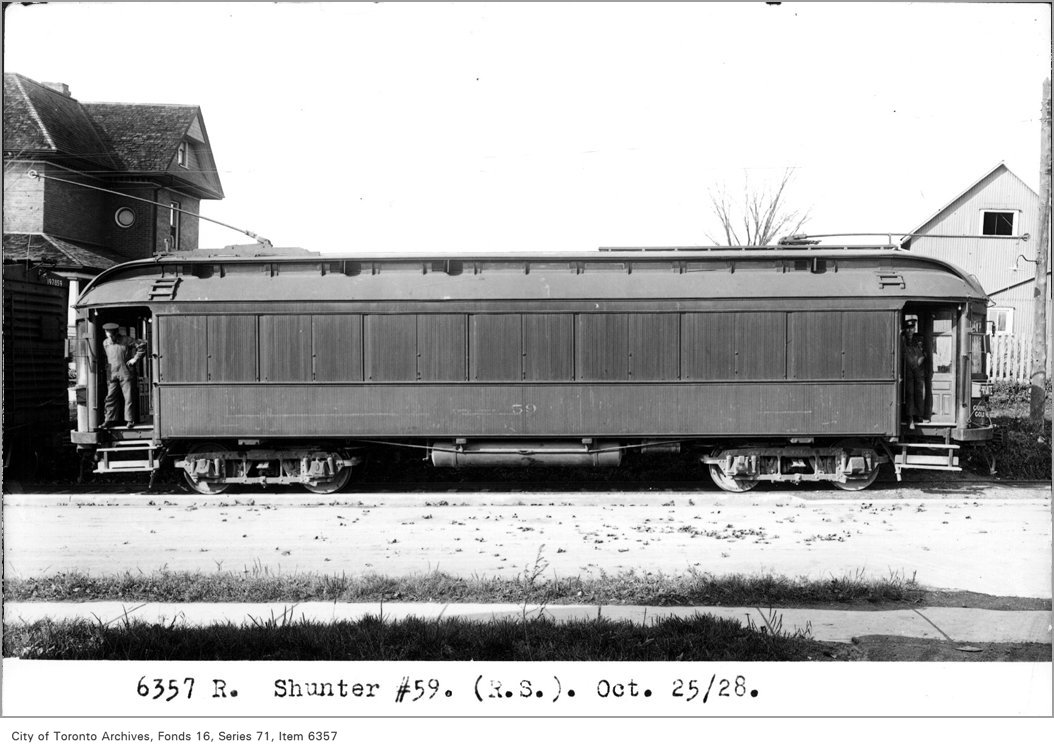
Photo showing the standard-gauge shunter as described, used in Aurora, 1928.

In Aurora, the TTC constructed a 3.2 km (2 mi) section of four-rail, dual-gauge track in order to deliver freight cars from a steam railway interchange to a local factory. (Three-rail dual gauge was not possible with only a 60 mm (2 3/8 in) difference between the two gauges.) The TTC adapted an old radial car as a standard-gauge switcher. This was one of only two locations where the TTC had dual-gauge trackage; the other was at the Hillcrest Complex.

In 1930, the Lake Simcoe line was closed. However, three months later the section from Glen Echo to Richmond Hill reopened as the North Yonge Railways. It was operated by the TTC until 1948, and was the TTC's last radial operation.

==== Toronto and Mimico Electric Railway and Light Company ====
The Toronto and Mimico Electric Railway and Light Company opened the Mimico radial line in 1892. It ran along Lake Shore Road and initially used Toronto gauge. By 1905, the line reached its full length from Humber Loop to Port Credit. After taking over the line in 1922, Hydro-Electric Railways converted it from Toronto to standard gauge. When the TTC subsequently took over the line in 1927, it converted the line back to Toronto gauge in one overnight operation. The TTC also closed the old T&YRR carhouse near Grenadier Pond and moved operations to Roncesvalles Carhouse. In late 1928, the Mimico line became the Port Credit line when the portion east of Long Branch Loop was replaced by a streetcar line (today used by 501 Queen). The Port Credit line closed in 1935, replaced by buses.

==== Toronto and Scarboro' Electric Railway, Light and Power Company ====
The Toronto and Scarboro' Electric Railway, Light and Power Company opened the Scarboro radial line in 1893. It ran along Kingston Road and used Toronto gauge for its entire life. By 1906, the line reached its full length from Queen Street to West Hill. After Hydro-Electric Railways took over the line in 1922, the portion of the line west of Victoria Park Avenue was replaced by a TTC streetcar line, used today by the 503 Kingston Rd streetcar route. In 1927, the line was taken over by the TTC and connected to Bingham Loop, and the Scarborough line's Warden carhouse was closed with operations moved to Russell Carhouse. The line was closed in 1936.

=== Toronto Suburban Railway ===
The Toronto Suburban Railway operated several radial lines west of the old city limits, all radiating from the Junction at Dundas Street and Keele Street. Its first line, the Davenport line (serving Davenport Road), opened in 1892. Next came three other lines: Lambton (1892, serving the neighbourhood of Lambton), Crescent (1893, serving Gilmore Avenue) and Weston (1895, serving Weston Road) with an extension to Woodbridge called the Woodbridge line (1914). These were basically semi-rural, suburban streetcar lines. All were built to a track gauge of 1,492 mm (4 ft 10 3/4 in), a variant of Toronto gauge. By the completion of the Toronto Suburban's standard-gauge Guelph line in 1917, all the other Suburban lines were converted to standard gauge.

The Toronto Street Railway had a wye in the intersection of Keele and Dundas streets to turn its single-ended streetcars coming from east of the intersection. Before its conversion to standard gauge, the Toronto Suburban shared a track of this wye to connect its routes east and north of the intersection. After the conversion to standard gauge, the wye was rebuilt with a curved, mixed-gauge crossing for Toronto Suburban cars.

After its creation in 1921, the TTC took over all radial lines within the Toronto city limits. Thus, the TTC took over the Lambton and Weston lines and converted them back to TTC gauge.

== See also ==
- Toronto subway track
- Toronto subway trackage
