= High Park Forest School =

Special school in Toronto, Canada

Coordinates: 43.6512°N 79.4635°W

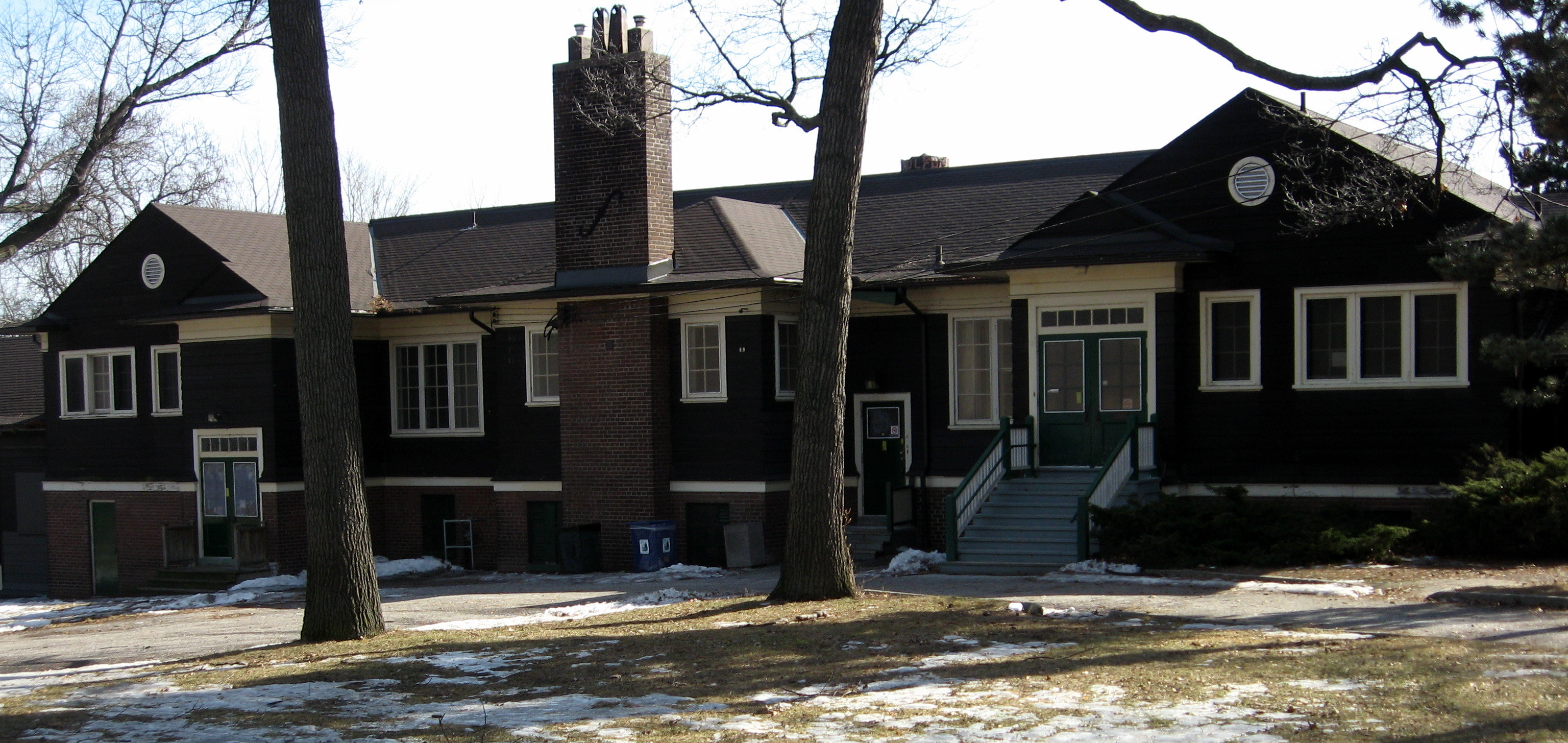
The school in 2009.

High Park Forest School is a former special school in High Park, Toronto, Ontario, Canada. It was a school founded to provide a boost to children who had tuberculosis or other physical detriments. Today, it is an outdoor environmental education facility run by a local non-profit organization called the High Park Nature Centre. It is located in High Park west of downtown, on Colborne Lodge Road.

== History ==
High Park Forest School was opened in the 1910s (there are sources that point to 1912, 1914 and 1915). It was initially a place for children with tuberculosis but through the years it became a summer school for underprivileged and/or undernourished children.

For the school’s first 18 years in operation, it occupied three outdoor tents; a permanent building was constructed only in 1932.

The forest schools ceased existence as a school for poor and/or undernourished children in 1963. In 1970, the area around the school was the site of an International Sculpture Symposium. Several sculptures are still in place around the school. Others have been moved to other locations. After the 1960s, the building was used by various organizations and was vacated in 2013. In 2015, High Park Nature Centre moved into the building.

== Curricula ==
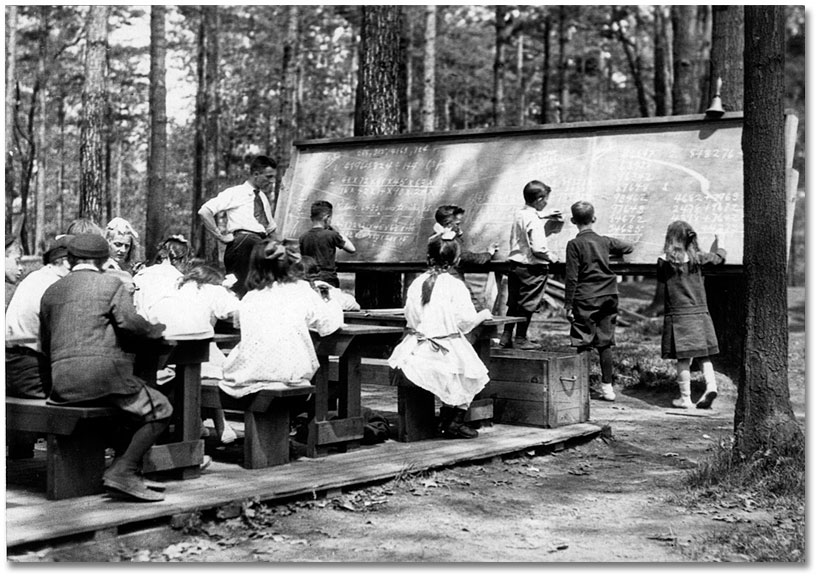
Mr. Brown's class at Forestry School in 1917

Poor and/or undernourished children from Toronto's public schools attended the school from May 1 to October 31 to augment their education, as well as to get good nutritious foods and exercise to help them become healthy.

Children attended the school Monday through Saturday (half days on Saturdays). On Saturdays, if the weather was good the children were all bussed to Sunnyside Swimming Pool where they were entitled to free admission and free swimming (no classes).

On Mondays through Fridays, children would attend at outdoor classrooms and in the mornings. They were brought snacks of whole wheat bread and butter and hot chocolate in the cooler months, and milk in the warmer months. At lunch time, the children would line up and go into the main building, entering through the main right hand door in the picture where whey were seated according to age. They were served a hot nutritious meal, milk and a cod liver oil pill every day.

After lunch, the children would line up once again inside the building to pick up their bed rolls, which consisted of a pillow, a sheet and an army-type blanket. There were cots set up near each classroom and the children would take their bedrolls to the cots for an afternoon nap of one hour.

When they awoke from their naps, they returned their bedrolls to the room inside where they were stored, then lined up to wash hands and faces and brush their teeth. The children returned to their classrooms for more education and then were served the whole wheat bread and hot chocolate or milk again. When 4 o'clock came...the teachers would escort each child up to Bloor Street and made sure each child got on the street cars for their journey home.

The objective was to provide underprivileged and/or undernourished children who ordinarily would have spent their summer days on the streets of Toronto a place to go for good food, good activities, good health and education; all the things the Toronto Board of Education felt poor and/or undernourished children would miss out on without this program.
