= Colborne Lodge =

Coordinates: 43°38′25.7″N 79°27′36.5″W

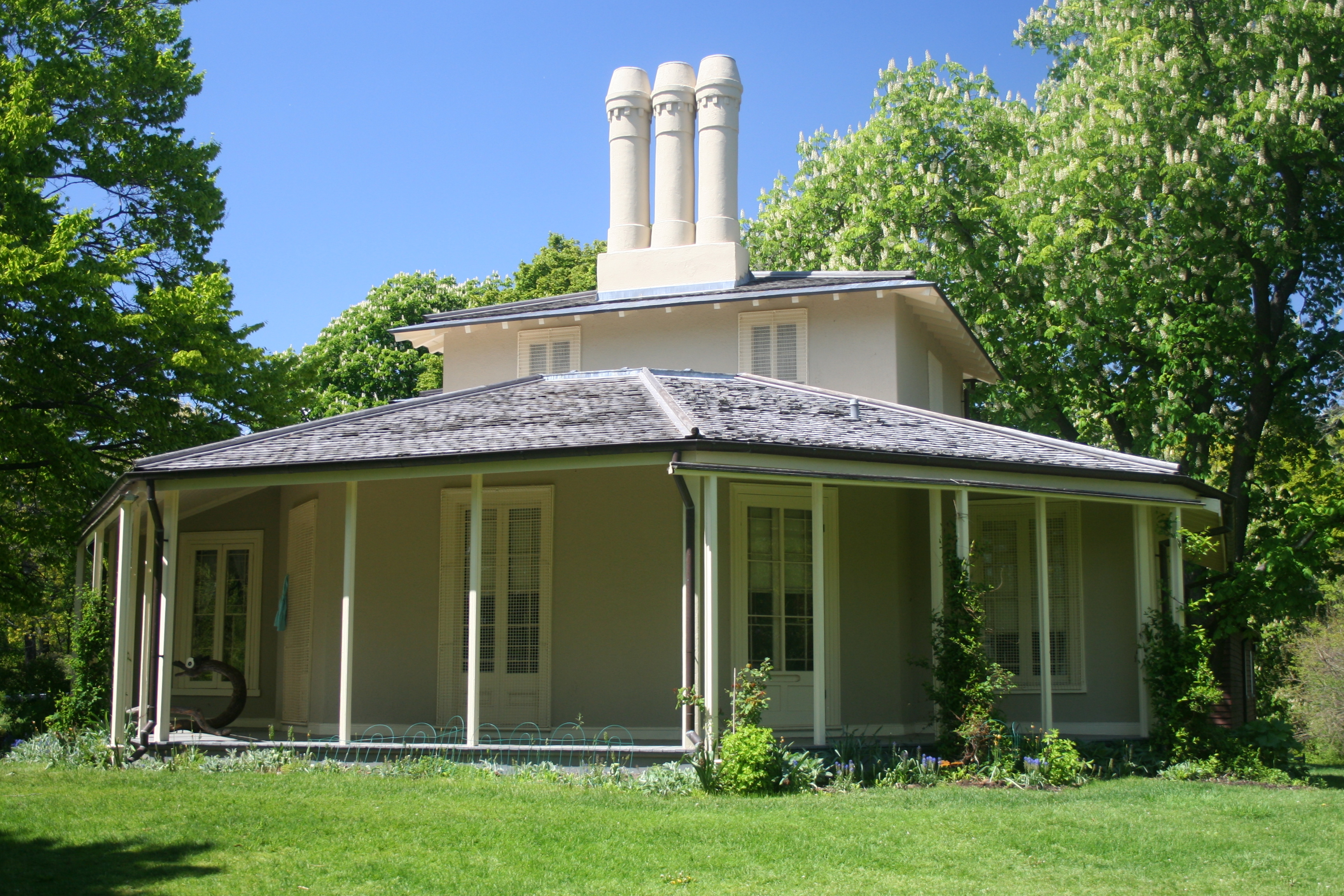
- Colborne Lodge in 2009
- Established: 1928
- Location: Toronto, Ontario, Canada
- Type: Historic house museum
- Website: Colborne Lodge website

Colborne Lodge is an historic house museum located in an 1837 home in Toronto's High Park. John George Howard, an architect, engineer and prominent Toronto citizen, built this house, which became the property of the city following his death in 1890.

== History ==
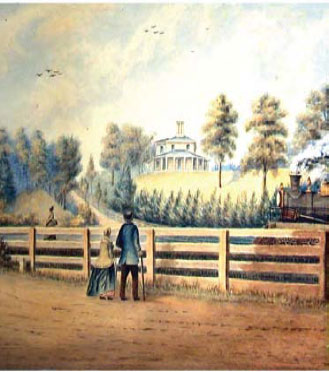
Colborne Lodge by John George Howard, 1865

Designed and built in 1836–1837 by City Surveyor John George Howard to house himself and his wife, Jemima Frances Meikle, Colborne Lodge is perched on the top of a hill overlooking Lake Ontario. The home is a classic example of the Regency picturesque cottage style, and it was one of the first such buildings in the area. The house sought to blend in with the landscape around it, in sharp contrast to the rigid formalism of Georgian architecture that was then the standard architectural style. It originally consisted of one storey and served as the Howards' country cottage. Following their move to reside at the property full-time in the 1850s, they expanded it by adding the cellar and upper level and additional rooms. This includes an indoor flush toilet, the earliest surviving example in Toronto.

The house was named after Sir John Colborne, Lieutenant-Governor of Upper Canada from 1828 to 1836 and the first Canadian patron of Howard's architecture. Next to the home is the Colborne Lodge gardens, first created by the Howards.

The cottage sat on 165 acres (67 ha) of land, forming a rectangular lot reaching from Bloor Street to Lake Ontario and encompassing roughly the central third of the modern High Park. The Howards later acquired a small nine acre plot adjacent to lake Ontario. Following their move to reside full-time at the Lodge, John and Jemima Howard established a small farm on the property, including farm cottages, a dairy, poultry house, and kitchen gardens. Later, John Howard attempted to subdivide his holdings and sell off small lots to create a new neighbourhood, although this was unsuccessful. At that time, the area was still a considerable distance west of Toronto and a difficult commute to town. The landscape of the property – with its steep hills, wetlands and sandy soils – would have been difficult to develop.

John and Jemima Howard had no children. In 1873, they deeded the entirety of the land and buildings to the City of Toronto, in exchange for a permanent pension. John continued to live in the house until his death in 1890. Additional adjacent land was purchased by the City in 1876 and 1930, thereby expanding the park to the current 399 acres (161 ha).

John and Jemima Howard are buried beneath the Howard Tomb, a stone monument located across Colborne Lodge Drive and overlooking Grenadier Pond. The cairn and other features were designed by John Howard. The fence surrounding the cairn was originally from St Paul's Cathedral in London and had been designed by the famous architect Christopher Wren. It dates from 1714, and John Howard had it shipped from London in 1875.

Following John Howard's death in 1890 until 1913, the house was occupied by the Stinson family, who were members of John Howard's domestic staff.

== Museum ==
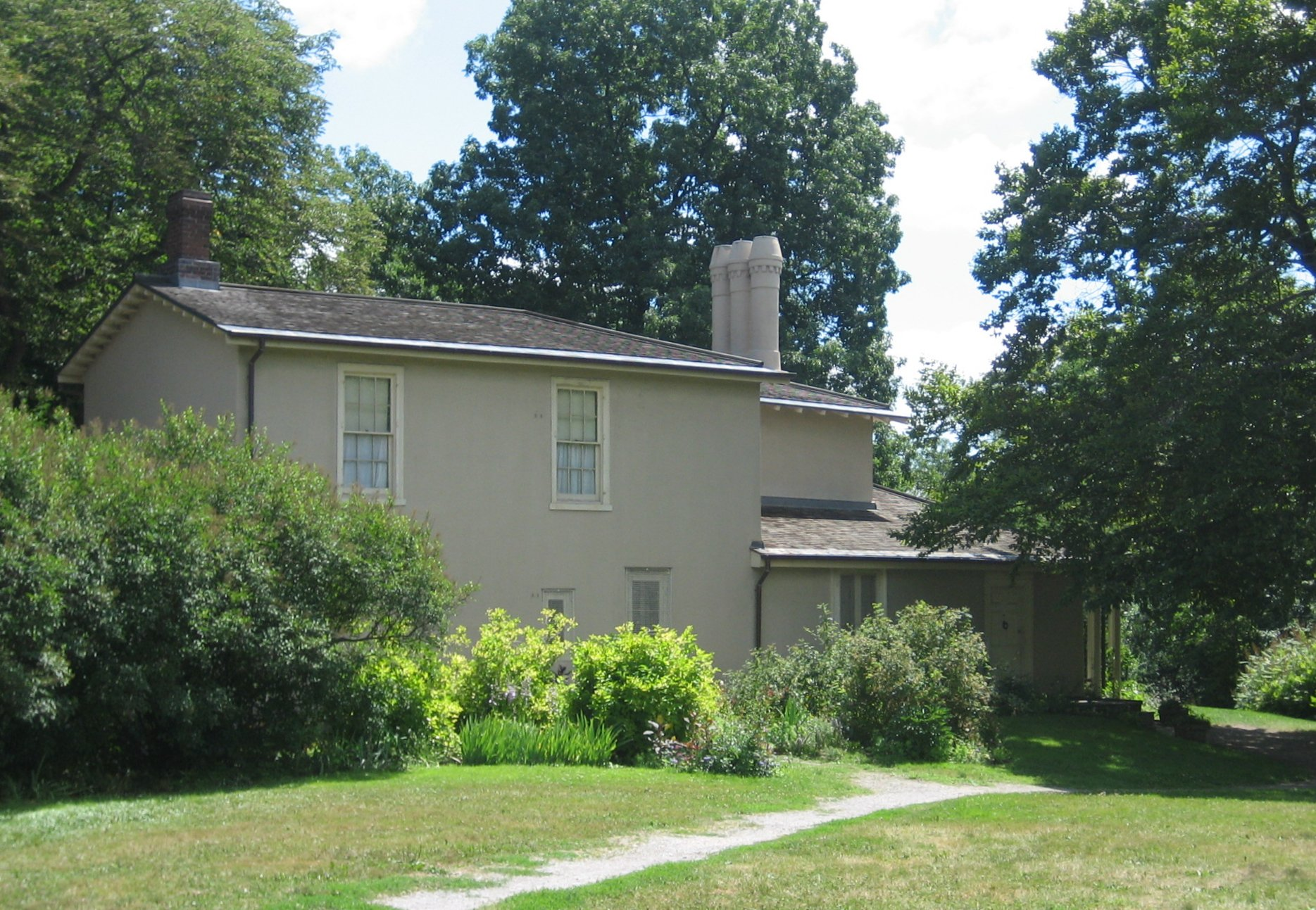
View of Colborne Lodge from the northwest in 2007, while operating as a municipally-owned museum

After a period of abandonment, Colborne Lodge was restored and opened as a museum in 1928 by the Women's Canadian Historical Society.

Currently, Colborne Lodge, the gardens, and the adjacent coach house form a historic house museum run by the City of Toronto. The museum displays the house and furnishings of the 1800s, including many of the Howards' own furniture, possessions, artworks and John Howard's architectural design features. The museum hosts events through the year, including activities during the High Park cherry blossom bloom, winter holiday period, and children's summer camps. Annually around Hallowe'en, guides put on a ghost tour, which discusses legends of ghostly appearances at the Lodge.

== See also ==
- List of museums in Toronto
- List of oldest buildings and structures in Toronto
