= High Park =

Urban park in Toronto, Canada

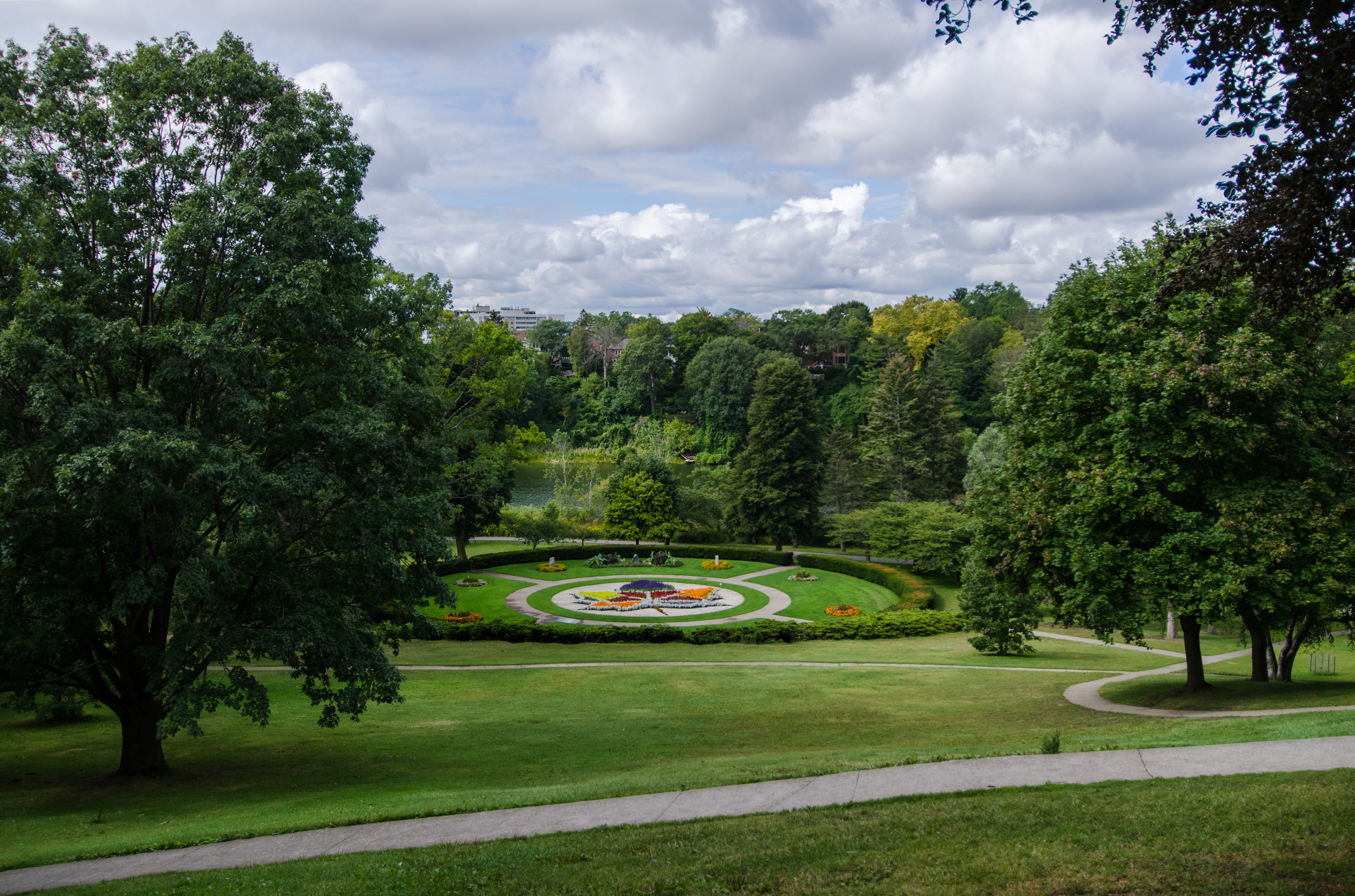
- High Park Hillside Gardens (2017)

- Location within Toronto
- Type: Urban park
- Location: 1873 Bloor Street West, Toronto, Ontario, Canada
- Coordinates: 43°38′49″N 79°27′47″W
- Area: 398 acres (161 ha)
- Created: 1876
- Owner: City of Toronto
- Operator: Toronto Parks, Forestry & Recreation
- Public transit: High Park and Keele stations
- Website: www.toronto.ca/highpark

High Park is a municipal park in Toronto, Ontario, Canada. High Park is a mixed recreational and natural park, with sporting facilities, cultural facilities, educational facilities, gardens, playgrounds and a zoo. One-third of the park remains in a natural state, with a rare oak savannah ecology. High Park was opened to the public in 1876 and is based on a bequest of land from John George Howard to the City of Toronto. It spans 161 hectares (400 acres) and is one of the largest parks in Toronto.

High Park is located to the west of downtown Toronto, north of Humber Bay, and is maintained by the City of Toronto Parks Department. It stretches south from Bloor Street West to The Queensway, just north of Lake Ontario. It is bounded on the west by Ellis Park Road and Grenadier Pond and on the east by Parkside Drive.

== Description ==
The landscape in the park is hilly, with two deep ravines extending the full north–south distance of the park. Significant natural parts of the park are classified as a provincial Area of Natural and Scientific Interest.

=== Eastern ravine ===
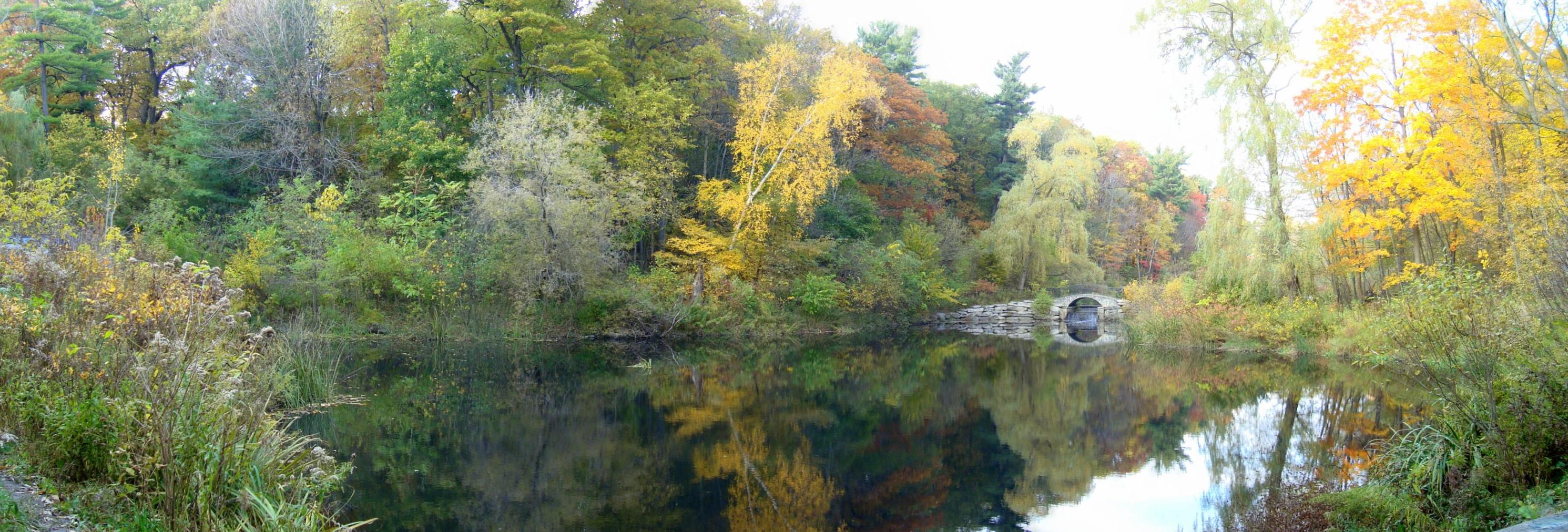
The eastern ravine at High Park.

The eastern ravine is a north–south ravine occupying the eastern half of the park along a small creek and several ponds. A forested area begins at the north-east corner of the park, at Bloor Street and Parkside Drive. The creek begins at spring-fed ponds, Howard Pond, and Ridout Pond and flows south through the ravine along Spring Creek Road. Halfway to the southern boundary of the park, the ravine is less forested with picnic areas, the adventure playground, and the zoo. Upper Duck Pond, just to the west of the adventure playground, often has several species of ducks, including wood ducks to be seen. The pond was one of the first locations where bird banding was done, marked by a plaque. Great blue herons can sometimes be seen there and at Lower Duck Pond, just north of The Queensway, where the water drains in pipes south to Lake Ontario.

The eastern ravine lies over a buried river. In 2003, city workers found strong evidence of the pre-ice-age Laurentian River when capping two artesian wells at the pond at the north-east corner of the Park. The wells began spewing a plume of water, sand, shale and gravel 15 metres into the air. With this discovery, geologists finally pinpointed the southern terminus of this ancient river system whose southerly flow begins near Georgian Bay. The watercourse, flowing 50 metres (160 ft) below the surface in pure bedrock, has remained undisturbed for thousands of years.

=== Central plain and savannah ===
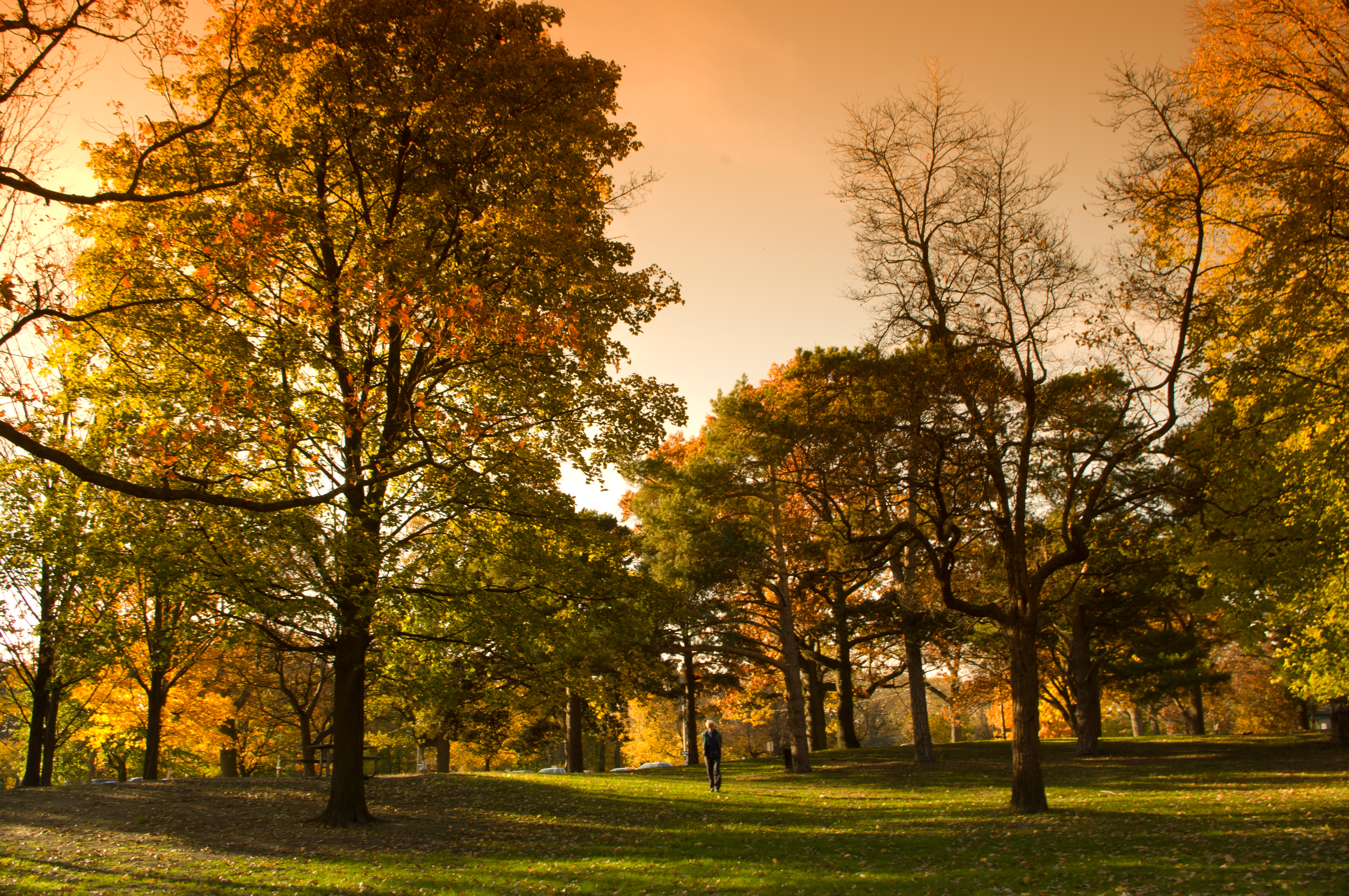
The central section of High Park includes a stretch of open habitat called the oak savannah.

The central section is a large plain encompassing most of the northern boundary, slowly narrowing to a point overlooking the lake, which is the location of Colborne Lodge. While most of the plain is developed for picnicking, gardens and sports fields, it has a stretch of open habitat called oak savannah, of which there are few other examples in Ontario. The towering black oak trees found throughout High Park are a characteristic of this habitat. Many of the trees are over 150 years old. The savannah is under the special care of the City and volunteer conservationists. Forested areas of High Park are maintained to mimic natural conditions, with downed trees left to decay. Regular controlled burns are done to mimic forest fires and their beneficial effects for oaks. Non-native plants outside the ornamental gardens are weeded out by volunteers. There is, however, no shortage of non-native trees including Colorado spruce, Scots pine and Northern catalpa.

=== Grenadier Pond ===
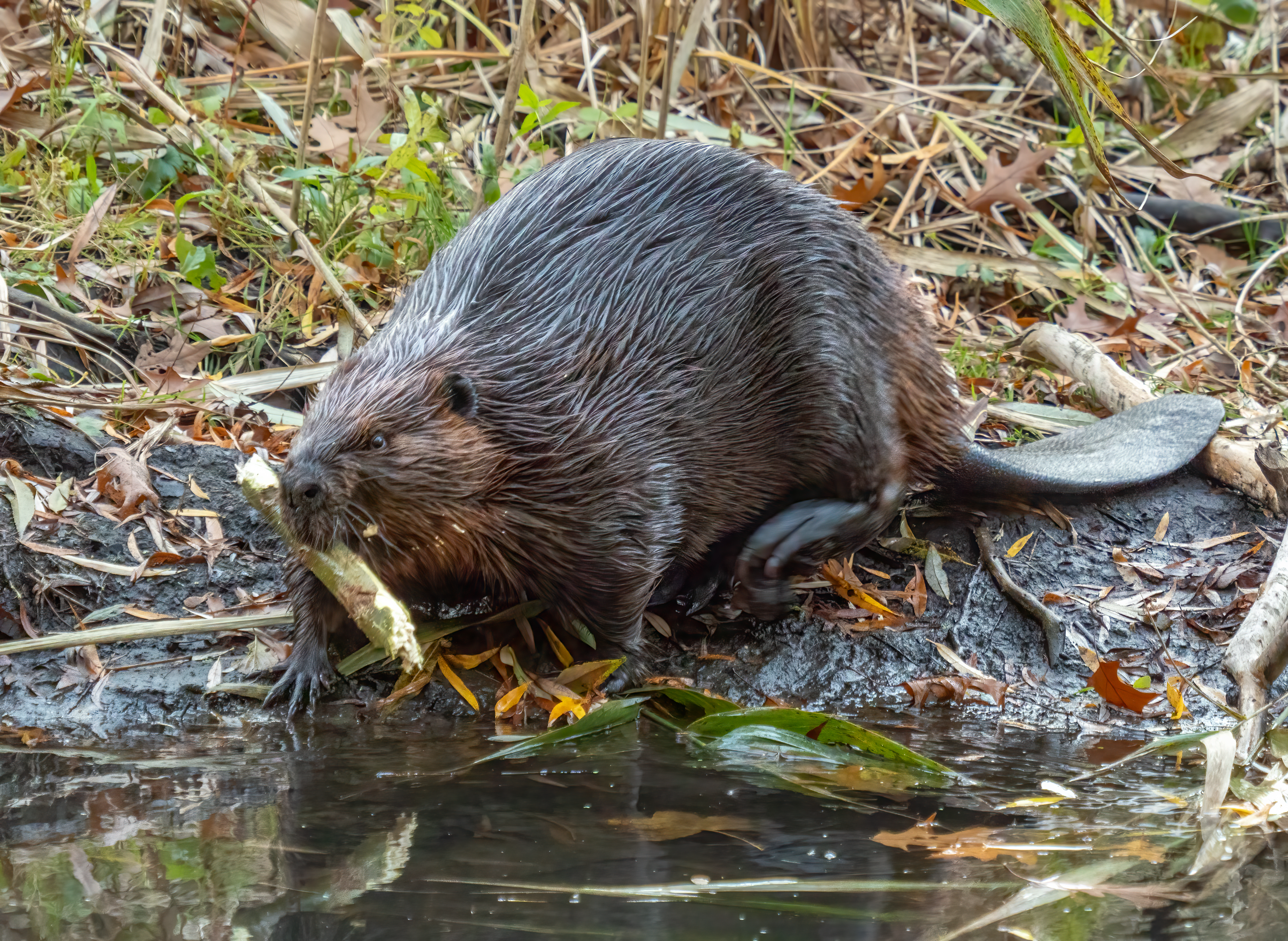
North American beaver in the north part of Grenadier Pond

Grenadier Pond is a large body of water 14.2 hectares (35 acres) in size, located on the western edge of the park. It is named after the local Town of York garrison of the 1800s and their use of the pond for fishing. There are two local myths circulating about the pond. One is that British Grenadiers fell through its thin ice when crossing to defend the city in the War of 1812. However the Grenadier Guards were not stationed at Fort York at this time, but rather the 8th (The King's) Regiment of Foot which are not linked to the Grenadier name. Most British infantry regiments grouped the largest and strongest men together during this period to form units of 'Grenadiers', who would form on the right flank of their parent regiment. Other myths include that the pond is 'bottomless', that is, its depth cannot be measured due to the amount of mud. Fishing remains a popular pastime. Largemouth bass, black crappie, yellow perch, pumpkinseed, bluegill, brown bullhead and carp sport fish are present in the pond. Fish caught in the pond are safe to eat, and fishing derbies and casting contests have been held there.

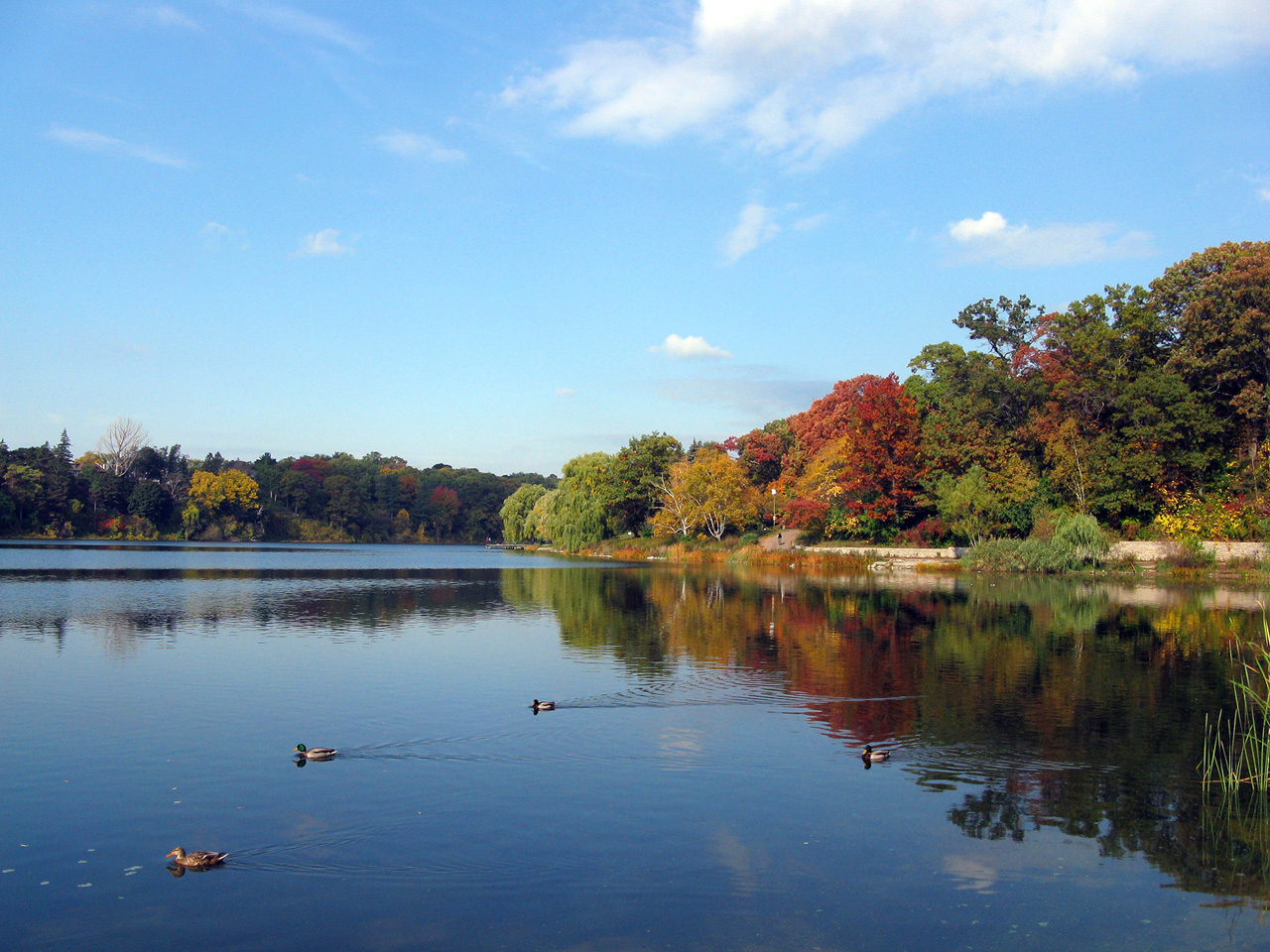
Grenadier Pond is a large body of water located at the western edge of High Park.

Initiatives have been made to improve the pond's health and environment. Grenadier Pond receives some of its water from Wendigo Creek (a small creek that began near Dundas Street West and Law Street and ran down to a sandbar to Lake Ontario) to Wendigo Pond and underground streams feeding it from the north. The northern end of the Pond was naturalized, building a wetland to filter the waters the Pond receives from the stream. The southern and south-western shore of the pond was also naturalized, removing the manicured lawn and concrete bank to improve the Pond's health and discourage Canada geese. Signs now ask people not to feed the waterfowl. Grenadier Pond is home to multiple species of bird and marsh wildlife. The pond exits out to Lake Ontario via pipes near Sir Casimir Gzowski Park, replacing the natural sandbar that existed for Wendigo Creek. Alongside its eastern shore are to be found High Park's hillside gardens and a grove of cherry trees.

At its northern end is a remnant of Wendigo Creek, Wendigo Pond and a children's playground. The creek, pond and Wendigo Way are likely named after the wendigo, mythical cannibalistic creatures of Algonquian mythology. Algonquins did not have a settlement in the park, but are believed to have used it for hunting and fishing and cultivating corn on the sandy uplands of the park. The ravine extending north along the creek at one time extended north of the park, past Bloor Street. The ravine was filled in to provide for an extension of Bloor Street, and for housing development north of the park.

== History ==
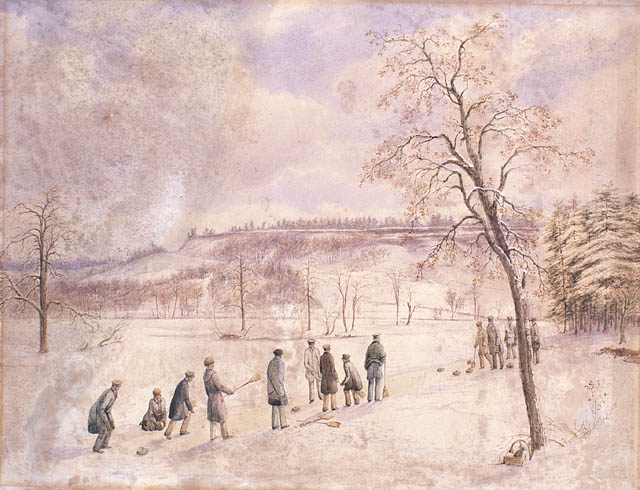
An 1836 watercolour of curling at High Park by John George Howard, the property's first owner.

In 1836, John George Howard purchased a 160-acre (65 ha) property in the County of York, to the west of Toronto, for a sheep farm, at the cost of $1,000. It was here that Howard designed and built Colborne Lodge, a Regency-style cottage in 1837 to complement its natural surroundings as the residence for himself and his wife Jemima Frances Meikle. The name 'High Park' is attributed to Jemima, as Colborne Lodge is situated on the highest point of the Humber Bay shoreline.

In 1854, the railway first came to the south of the Howard estate. Howard sold a strip of land approximately 2 acres (0.81 ha) along the southern edge of the property to Hamilton and Toronto Railway Company (Great Western Railway) for £300 (equivalent to £28,755 in 2025). The sand bar separating Grenadier Pond from Lake Ontario was filled in to support the rails. An outlet weir was installed to control water levels. In 1891, a further strip was sold to the Grand Trunk Railway for CA$1,000 (equivalent to $35,898 in 2025).

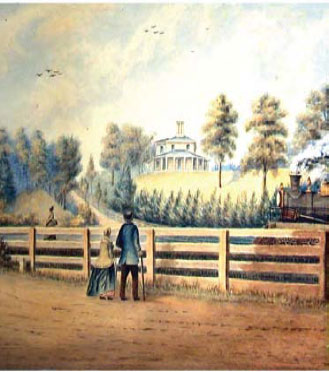
Colborne Lodge in 1865. Several years later, in 1873, Howard would bequeath the property to the City of Toronto as an urban park.

After a successful career as architect, engineer and land surveyor to the City of Toronto, Howard retired here in 1855. In 1873, Howard and his wife agreed to convey their country property of 120 acres (49 ha) to the City of Toronto. There were several conditions to the conveyance, including that the Howards continue to live at their residence, no alcohol ever be served in the park, and that the city hold the park "for the free use, benefit and enjoyment of the Citizens of Toronto for ever and to be called and designated at all times thereafter High Park". The City also had to pay a CA$300 down payment and an annual CA$1,200 (equivalent to $39,224 in 2025) pension to the Howards as long as either of them lived. The city council voted 13 to 2 to accept the Howard's conditions. The two dissenters felt the park was too far away from the city to be of any use to its citizens. At the time, direct access to the Howard property was only by boat, the railway line to the south or a toll road. Soon afterward the "Road to High Park" was built from the Lake Road to the park lands, today's Spring Road and Centre Road.

In 1876, a 120-acre (49 ha) portion of the Howard's property formed the original park, along with 176 acres (71 ha) bought from Percival Ridout east of the Howard farm. The remaining southern 40 acres (16 ha) of Howard's property, including Colborne Lodge, passed to the city after John Howard's death in 1890. The Howards are buried in High Park, under a stone monument that is fronted by a portion of ornate fencing from St. Paul's Cathedral in London, England, across the street from Colborne Lodge. Today, Colborne Lodge is a museum containing many of the original Howard furnishings and a collection of Howard's watercolours of early Toronto. The museum is open year-round.

The western section of High Park, including Grenadier Pond was privately owned by the Ellis family (headed by John Ellis), after which Ellis Avenue is named. The Ellis family sold the land to the Chapman family, which used Grenadier Pond for ice-making under the brand name of the Grenadier Ice Company from the 1880s. After the development of artificial ice-making and modern refrigerators, ice-making from Grenadier Pond ceased around 1920 (operations moved to a Lake Simcoe location under Alfred H. Chapman, Toronto architect who inherited the family business after his father's death) The Grenadier Ice Company was located south of Grenadier Pond, east of Ellis Avenue. In 1930, the Chapmans sold 71.8 acres (29.1 ha), including the pond, to the City for CA$150,000 (equivalent to $2,706,593 in 2025).

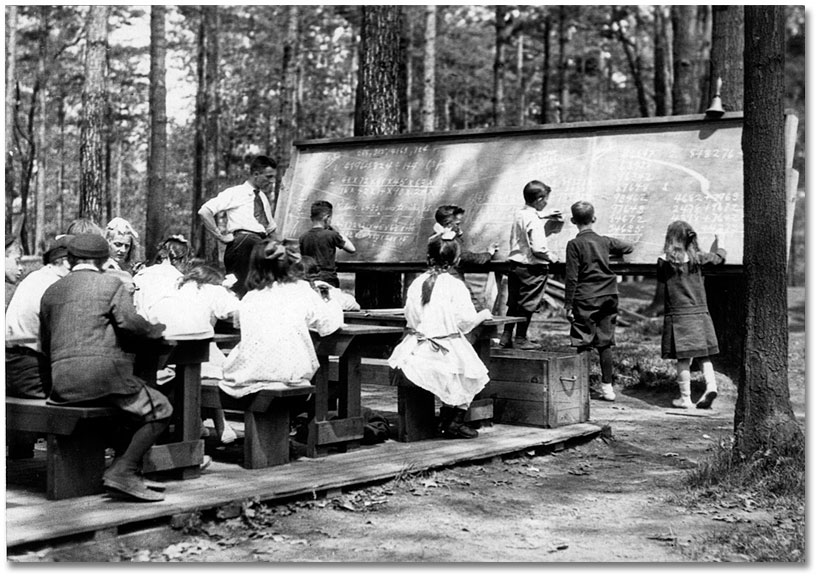
Students attending High Park Forest School in 1917. The school first opened at the Park in 1915.

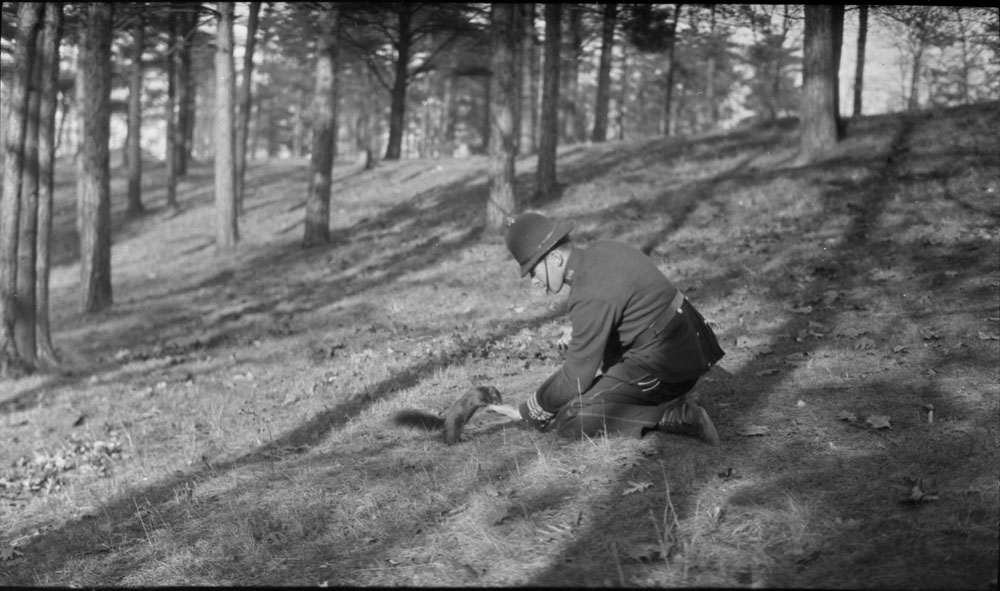
Policeman feeding a squirrel in High Park, 1917

The High Park Forest School was opened in 1915 on two acres at Colborne Lodge Road at Spring Road. The public school was for children of "low vitality" and emphasized physical activity over academics and often held classes outdoors. After the 1960s, the building was used by various organizations and was vacated in 2013. In 2015, High Park Nature Centre moved into the building.

In 1921, graves were found northwest of Grenadier Pond on the sandy ridge, during the course of road construction near Harcroft and Olympus Avenue, then the Harcroft Bird Sanctuary of architect J. A. Harvey. Eight skeletons were found in the sitting position in red sand below a huge stump. Other, smaller skeletons were found nearby. The human remains were dated to between 2,500 BC to 800 AD, indicating some sort of indigenous peoples' presence at High Park. The remains were coated in hematite red powdery substance in the custom of the Red Paint People who lived in New England and Atlantic Canada. The site is also similar to the Red Ocher people indigenous people who made burials in sandy ridges.

18 acres (7.3 ha) of High Park was later given to Metro Transportation when The Queensway was built in the early 1950s. This was in contravention of stipulations by original High Park owner John Howard that the lands be used for parkland only. Metro officials searched for descendants of Howard to obtain their consent.

The park was known as a location for clandestine meetings of homosexuals in the days before the decriminalization of homosexuality in Canada in the 1960s. Its reputation as a meeting place persisted for decades afterward. In 1985, a group of five young teenage boys from Toronto suburbs went to High Park and beat to death a 40-year-old male librarian.

In 1993, the High Park Citizens' Advisory Committee was founded as a volunteer group to aid the City of Toronto in the stewardship of the park. The group was renamed the High Park Community Advisory Council in 2003. The group and its offshoots have developed various programs and initiatives for the park, including the Volunteer Stewardship Program, which is involved in preserving and protecting the environment of the park. The group is active in promoting the natural plant species in the park, and volunteers regularly remove invasive non-native species.

According to the Taiaiako'n Historical Preservation Society, there are 57 ancient indigenous peoples' burial mounds in the park. In May 2011, one such location was occupied by the Society. The site, a small hill known as "Snake Mound" on the west bank of Lower Duck Pond, had been eroded by illegal BMX bike use. The society, in cooperation with the City of Toronto, cordoned off the location and worked to restore the site, fixing the erosion, and removing the bike ramps present. At first, a replacement BMX bike park was suggested for the parking lot at the south end of Spring Road, but public opposition led the bike facility to be built south of the railway, on land that was infilled in the 1920s as part of the Sunnyside park development. A mound north of Grenadier Restaurant, known as "Bear Mound", is believed by the Society to also be an ancient burial mound, although an assessment done for the City concluded otherwise.

In 2012, Toronto City Council, in a round of cuts to city services, voted to discontinue supporting the High Park Zoo and seek alternative funding. The zoo cost over CA$100,000 annually to operate and was operated by the city's Park and Recreations Department. An organization, "Friends of the High Park Zoo", was formed to fund-raise and seek other sponsors for the zoo. In April 2012, the organization was successful in finding a sponsor (the Honey Family Foundation) while the organization developed a permanent source of funding. The sponsor matched public donations for the next three years. The City restored operational funding in 2014. The Friends fund-raises for improvements to the zoo.

== Points of interest ==
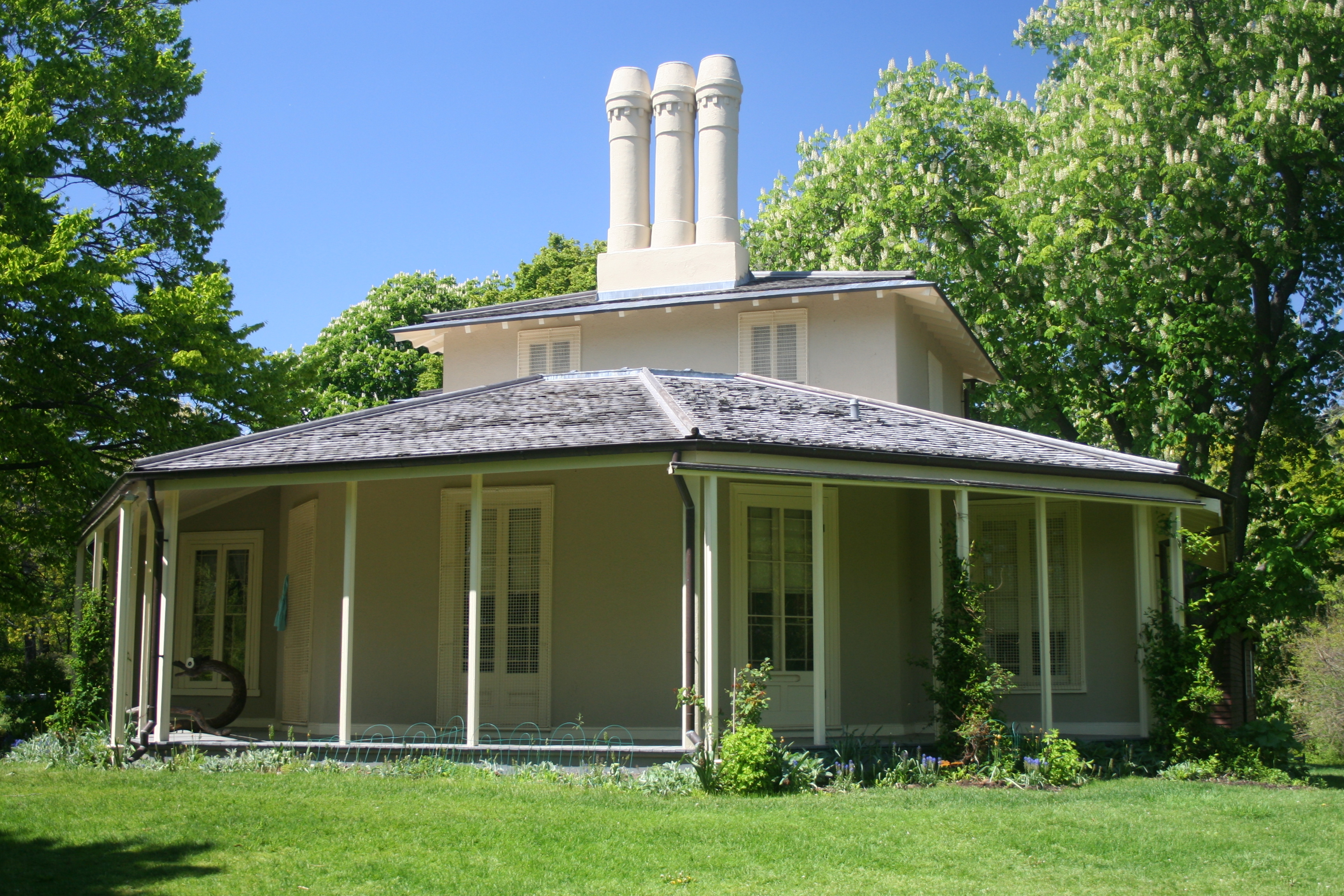
Completed in 1837, Colborne Lodge is presently a historical museum located in the Park.

The park includes several points of interest, including Colborne Lodge historical museum, the hillside gardens, the zoo, the Grenadier Cafe and the amphitheatre. The park also has sports fields, a hockey rink, a pool, tennis courts, playgrounds, nature trails and picnic areas.

From spring to fall, a "trackless train"—a tractor that tows several wagons decorated to look like a red and white train—is operated, making a tour of the park every 30 minutes. The train stops near Bloor Street, the north-western playground, west of the Grenadier Cafe, at Grenadier Pond, south of Colborne Lodge and at the Bell playground. Tickets for the train are purchased from the train's conductor.

=== Colborne Lodge ===
Colborne Lodge is a historical museum located in an 1836 home built by John George Howard, an architect, engineer, and prominent Toronto citizen who was the first land-owner of High Park. Howard built this house, to house himself and his wife Jemima Frances Meikle. The lodge became the property of the city following his death in 1890. It is perched on the top of a hill overlooking Lake Ontario. Across the street from the lodge is Howard's tomb, a cairn monument of Howard and his wife. The fence gate for the cairn is originally from St Paul's Cathedral in London, England. It dates from 1714, designed by Christopher Wren. Howard had it shipped from London in 1875.

=== Gardens ===
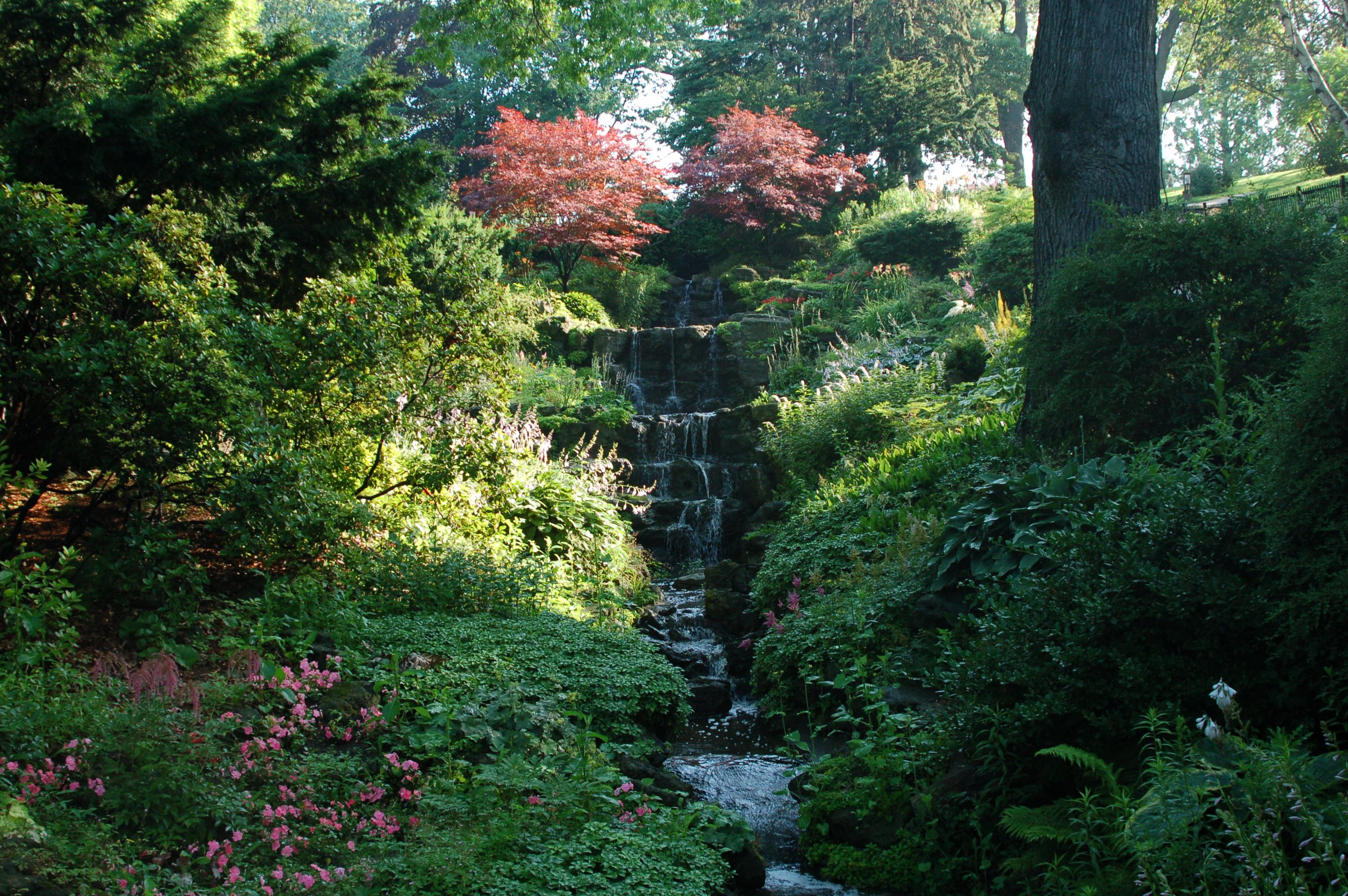
Landscaped gardens in High Park

On the hill to the east of Grenadier Pond, extending up to Colborne Lodge Road, is a landscaped ornamental garden area known as "Hillside Gardens". There is a rock garden extending from the top of the hill near Grenadier Cafe, extending south-west nearly to the pond shore. Along Colborne Lodge Road is a hanging garden and ornamental garden with fountains, the 'sunken gardens.' At the bottom of the hill, nearly at the shoreline is a large maple leaf-shaped flower bed, visible from the top of the hill. The area was a tobogganing area in the early 1900s. Toboggan-runs were constructed from the top of the hill extending down to the pond's ice surface. Wedding photography is no longer permitted in the hillside gardens area.

North of Colborne Lodge is the High Park Children's Garden. It offers programs for schools in the fall and spring, and day camps during the summer for children to learn about growing plants and Toronto parks. The Children's Garden and Colborne Lodge hold an annual 'Harvest Festival' in the fall. It includes craft activities, pumpkin-decorating, gardening displays, traditional games, and rides on horse-drawn wagons.

North-east of the Grenadier Cafe are High Park's 109 allotment gardens. To the east, south of Centre Road, are the High Park greenhouses. Since 1956, the High Park greenhouses have produced millions of annuals and perennials for Toronto's park system. The nine interconnected greenhouses provide a view into the way the plants are grown and distributed across the city. The greenhouses are not normally open to the public, but are occasionally opened to tours.

Further north, around the High Park Forest School, are several examples of outdoor sculpture in the former sculpture garden. The sculptures were commissioned and placed around the area for a 1967 international symposium. Several of the sculptures are placed within the forested area. Since the symposium, several sculptures were relocated to other Toronto locations. One was relocated to Corktown Common and another to Iceboat Terrace, west of Spadina Avenue.

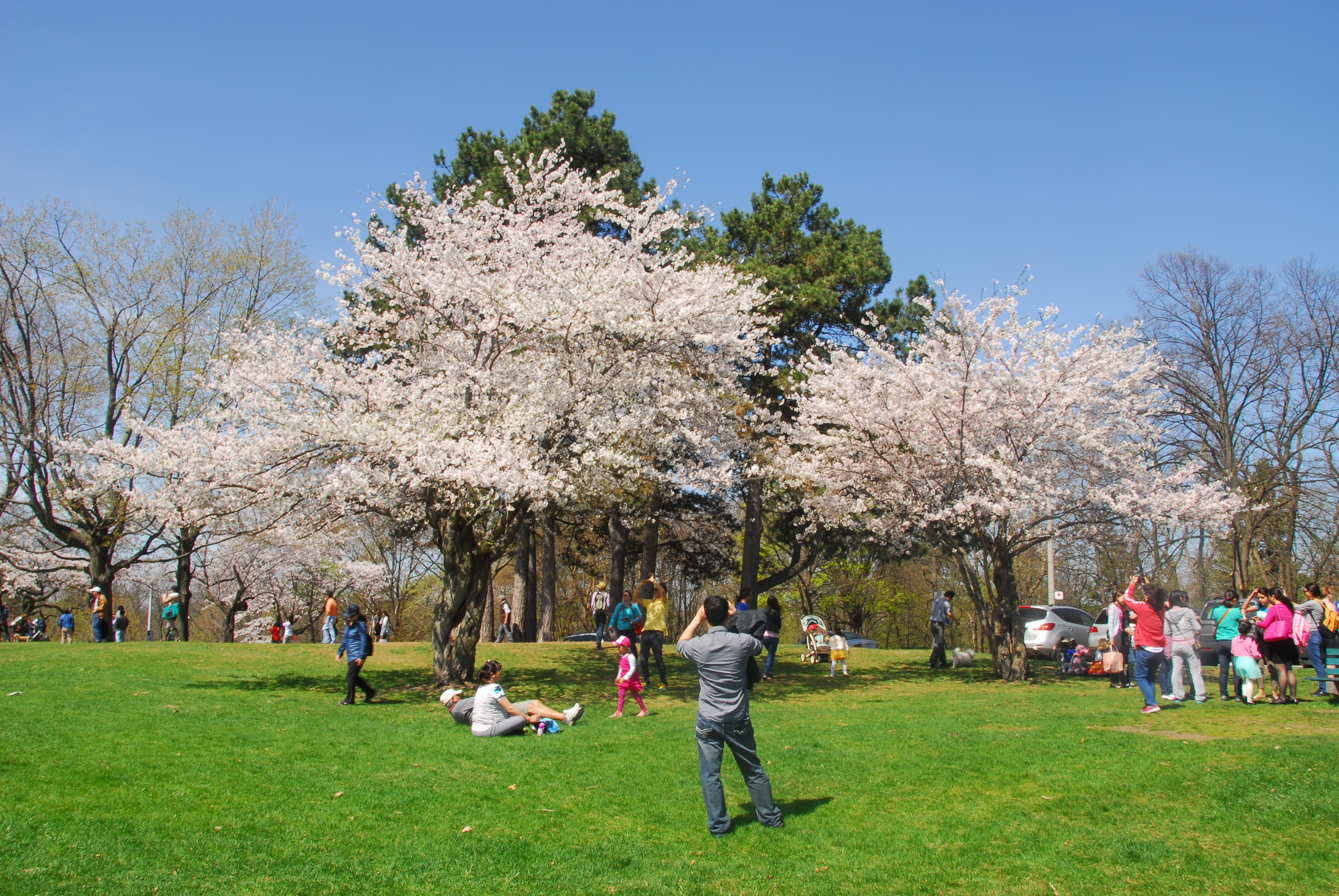
Japanese cherry trees, the oldest planted in 1959.

=== Cherry trees ===
There are several plantings of Japanese cherry trees in the park, attracting thousands of visitors every year from late April to early May. The main planting is a grove of trees along a roadway originating near Grenadier Cafe, leading down to Grenadier Pond. The other plantings are along West Road, the shore of the pond and west of the Jamie Bell playground. In 1959, the first Japanese Somei-Yoshino Cherry Tree was planted in High Park, a gift from the citizens of Tokyo. A plaque marks the spot in 1959 where the trees were presented by the Japanese ambassador to Toronto mayor Nathan Phillips. In all, over 2000 cherry trees were donated to Toronto.

Another 34 cherry trees were donated to High Park in 2001 from the Sakura project. These were planted around the Maple Leaf garden on the eastern shore of the pond. In 2006, a further 16 were planted in the park. In March 2019, Sakura in High Park indicated that following a brutal winter season, some trees showed signs of damage, however, many showed healthy, growing buds. The amount of visitors has necessitated the closure of the park to automobile traffic during the blooming period.

=== Grenadier Cafe ===
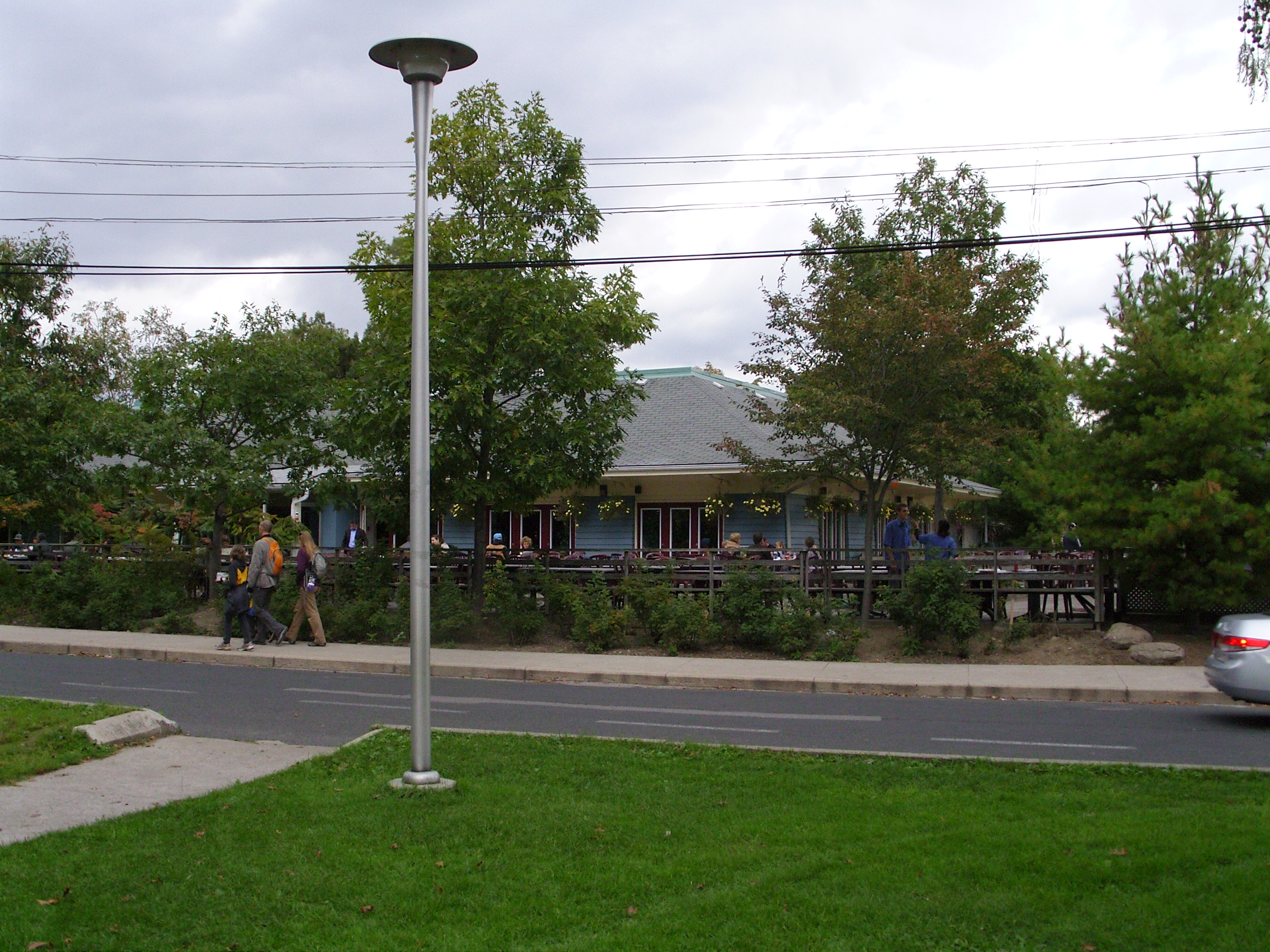
Grenadier Cafe is a restaurant and outdoor patio area located in the centre of the park.

A 300-seat restaurant and outdoor patio area is located in the centre of the park at the intersection of West Road and Colborne Lodge Road. The restaurant opened in May 1958 as a dining room and coffee shop, known as The Grenadier. The outdoor patio area was added later. Due to the condition in the Howards' conveyance forbidding the consumption of alcohol in the park, High Park is the last "dry" area of the City of Toronto, and the Cafe restaurant and banquet hall is not licensed to serve alcohol. The restaurant is owned by the City of Toronto, and privately operated under contract by the Grenadier Group.

An outdoor organic produce market operates during the summer weekends. Twice a year, plant sales are held at the Cafe of plants native to the park to raise money for conservation activities. The plants are native to High Park and Ontario and cultivation of the plants is encouraged to preserve the species. The Cafe is also used for community meetings.

A labyrinth, based on the Chartres pattern, is located north of the cafe, marked onto a concrete circle formerly used for a picnic shelter. It was installed in 2004.

=== High Park Nature Centre ===
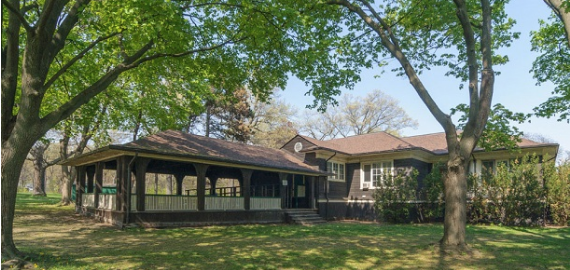
High Park Nature Centre is located at the High Park Forest School building.

The High Park Nature Centre, located in the Forest School building, offers year-round outdoor and indoor programming to learn about nature. It has programs for parents and babies, school-aged children as well as family walks and adult workshops and lectures. A number of programmes with volunteers undertake stewardship activities in High Park to preserve native plant species, including the yearly removal of invasive species such as buckthorn. The Centre also organizes nature walks in the park. In 2016, over 12,000 visitors people took part in High Park Nature Centre programming.

The Centre is operated by High Park Initiatives, a registered non-profit organization. The High Park Nature Centre was awarded an Ontario Trillium Foundation grant in 2014, allowing for the purchase of furnishings to equip the much larger Forest School space and also to expand programming. Recently, an Outdoor Urban Restoration Space (OURSpace) was developed with the assistance of a Weston Parks Challenge Grant. The Centre was established in 1999.

=== High Park Zoo ===
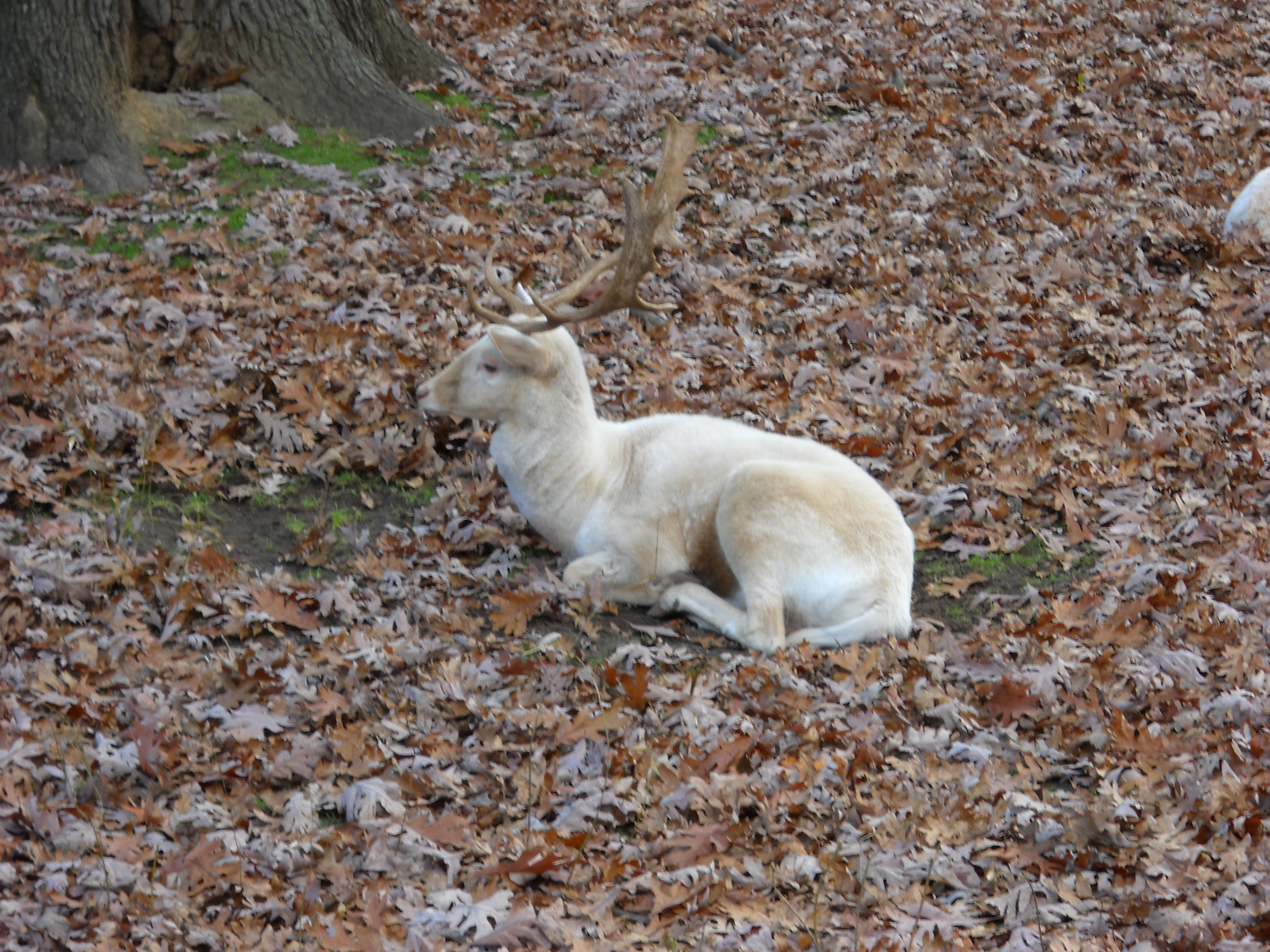
White Deer Buck rests at High Park Zoo

High Park Zoo is a small collection of animals along Deer Pen Road, which rises from the eastern ravine up to the plateau near the Grenadier Restaurant. The zoo keeps American bison, Barbary sheep, capybaras, emus, Highland cattle, llamas, mouflon, peacocks, reindeer, wallabies and yaks in eleven paddocks. The zoo is open year-round from 7:00 a.m. to dusk. On weekends from March to October, the llama pen is open for visitors to feed and pet the llamas. Chickens and rabbits are also kept for children to interact with at the same time as the llama visits.

The zoo animals are cared for by Toronto Parks, Forestry and Recreation Division staff and Friends of High Park Zoo volunteers. The zoo's budget is partly paid for by volunteer donations to donation boxes located along the zoo and online donations that are matched by charitable foundations. Friends of High Park Zoo was formed after Toronto City Council voted to cancel funding for the zoo in 2012. The organization has announced a master plan of improvements it hopes to make to the zoo.

The practice of keeping animals in the park originated in 1893, with the keeping of deer. The zoo received international media coverage in 2015 when a peacock escaped and was at large in the surrounding neighbourhood for several weeks before returning on its own to the zoo.

==== Capybaras ====
Two capybaras escaped from the zoo in May 2016, sparking a city-wide search. Despite initial attempts to recapture them, the capybaras evaded capture and were sighted throughout the city. One capybara was finally captured on June 12, and the other was captured on June 28. Due to their exploits, the pair were nicknamed Bonnie and Clyde. The search cost the city $15,000 in services and overtime pay for approximately 30 park staff members. In 2017, the pair welcomed three baby pups, who were named Geddy, Alex, and Neil, after the members of the Toronto-based rock band Rush.

=== Shakespeare in High Park ===
During the summer months, the Canadian Stage Company puts on selected Shakespearean plays in the park's amphitheatre. The amphitheatre is on the hill side directly to the east of the Grenadier Cafe and seats a few hundred people. The annual event is called "Shakespeare in High Park" and is popular with Torontonians.

== Recreation ==
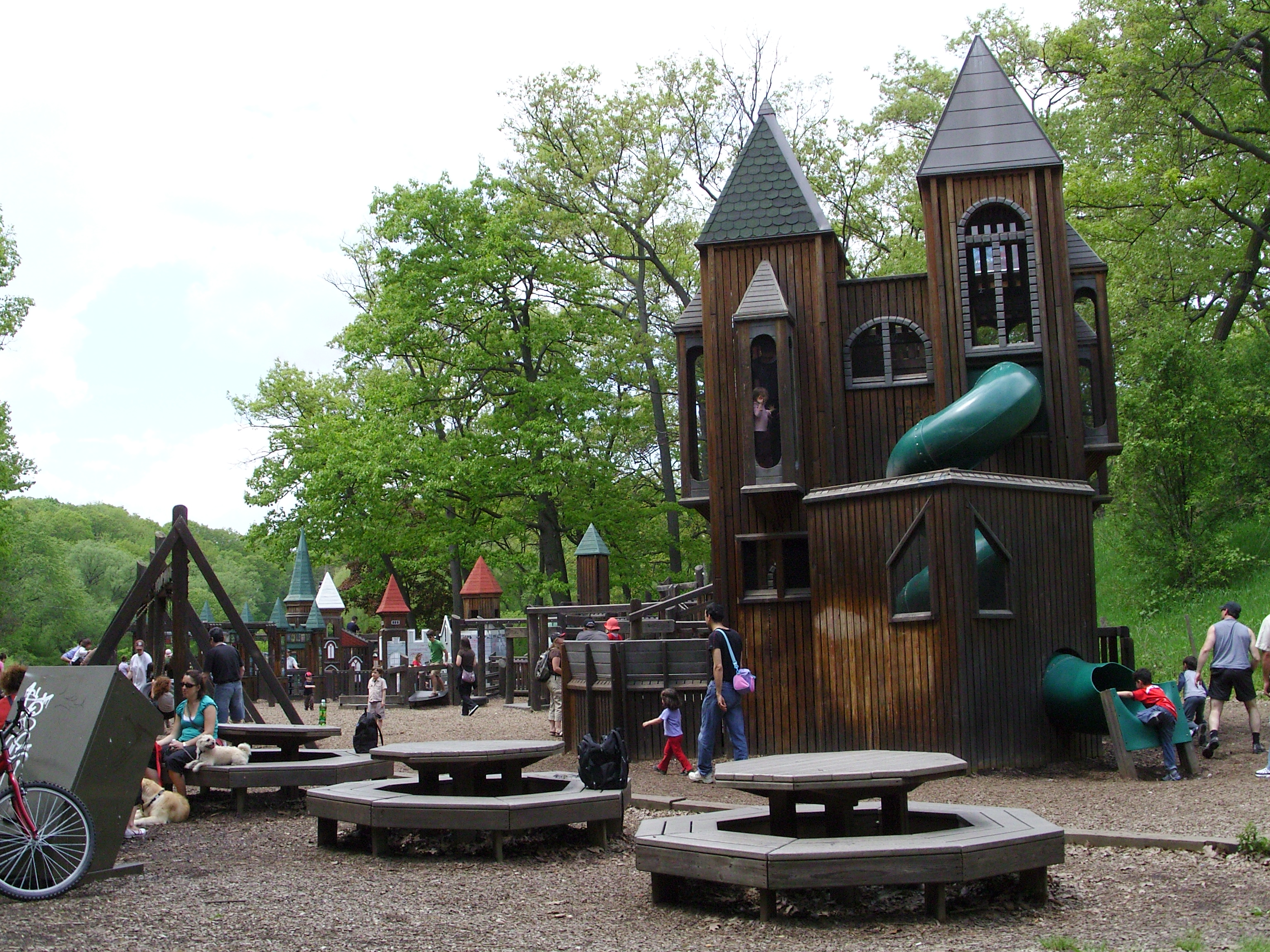
Playground prior to fire

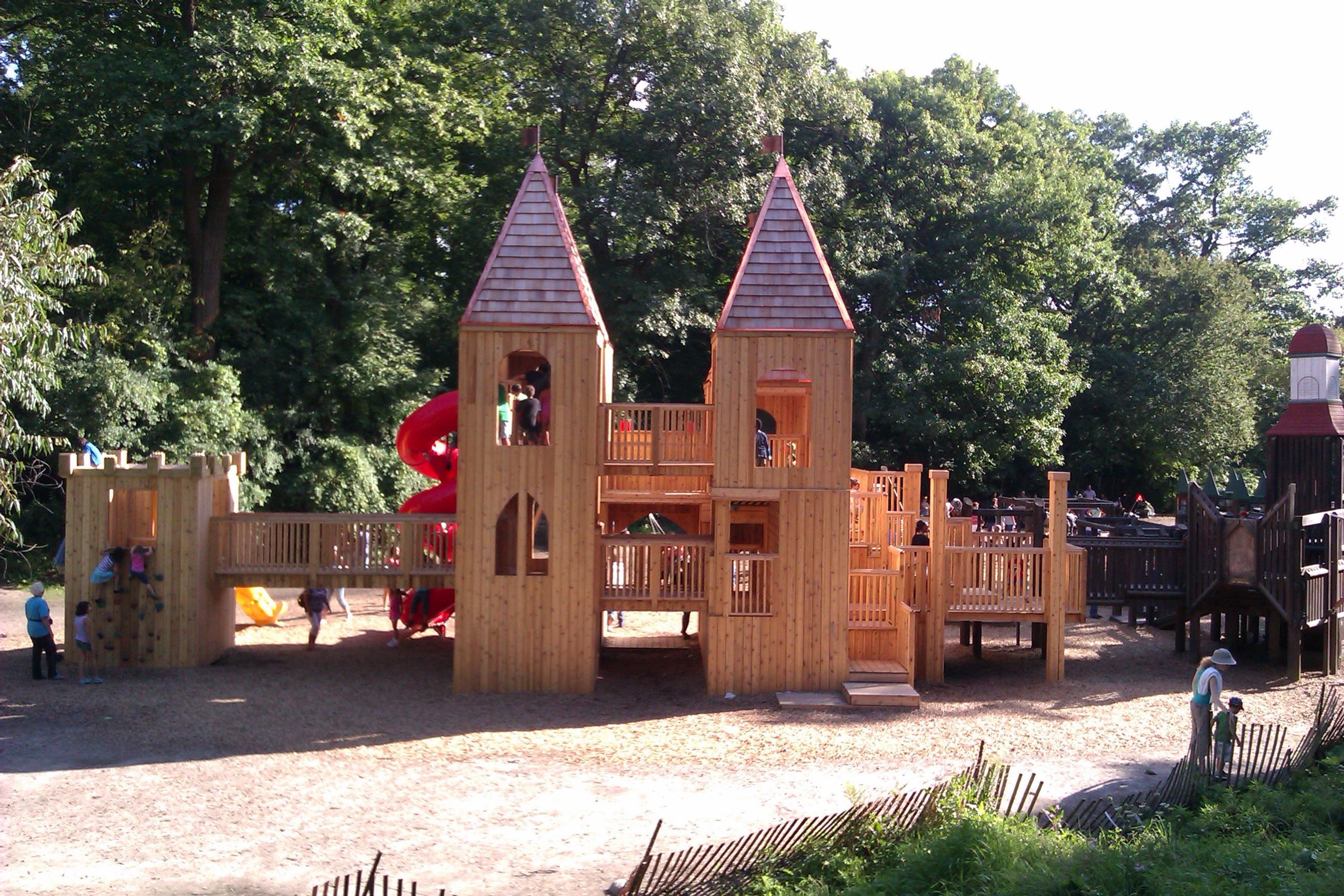
Reconstructed playground

Jamie Bell Adventure Playground at High Park

There are two main children's playgrounds in High Park. There is a playground in the northwest quadrant with a wading pool, picnic areas and snack bar. In a hollow in the south-east corner of the park, an 'adventure playground' for children was assembled by volunteers in 1999. It consists of wooden play structures with a "castle" theme, plus some swings. The playground is named after Jamie Bell, a volunteer who initially pioneered the idea. In March 2012, a portion of the wooden play structures was burned down in an act of arson. A new castle, created by Mike Holmes and landscape architect Janet Rosenberg, was rebuilt on the weekend of July 7–8, 2012 by volunteers. Another small play area is in the ravine just north of Grenadier Pond.

Dogs are welcome in the park. There is a large "off-leash" area to the north-east of the Grenadier Cafe. In the rest of the park, dogs must remain on-leash.

There are unpaved dirt trails throughout High Park that are for hikers and walkers only. Cycling is prohibited (by law) on unpaved trails and roads in the park to prevent erosion and disturbance. Several of the former roadways within the park have been closed to automotive traffic, but are still accessible to pedestrians and cyclists. In the winter, the hiking paths are maintained for cross-country skiing and snowshoeing.

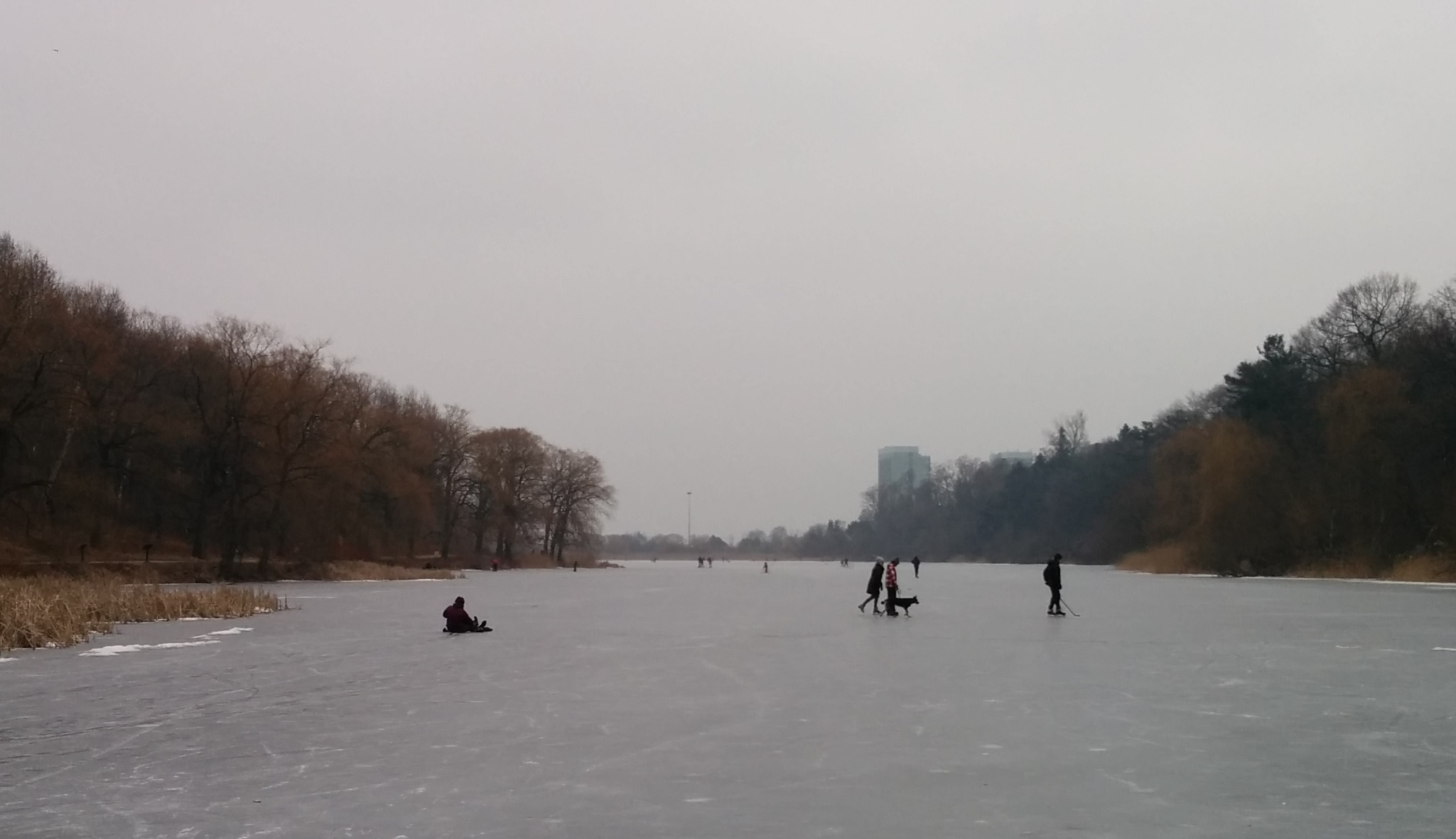
Skaters on Grenadier Pond in January 2015.

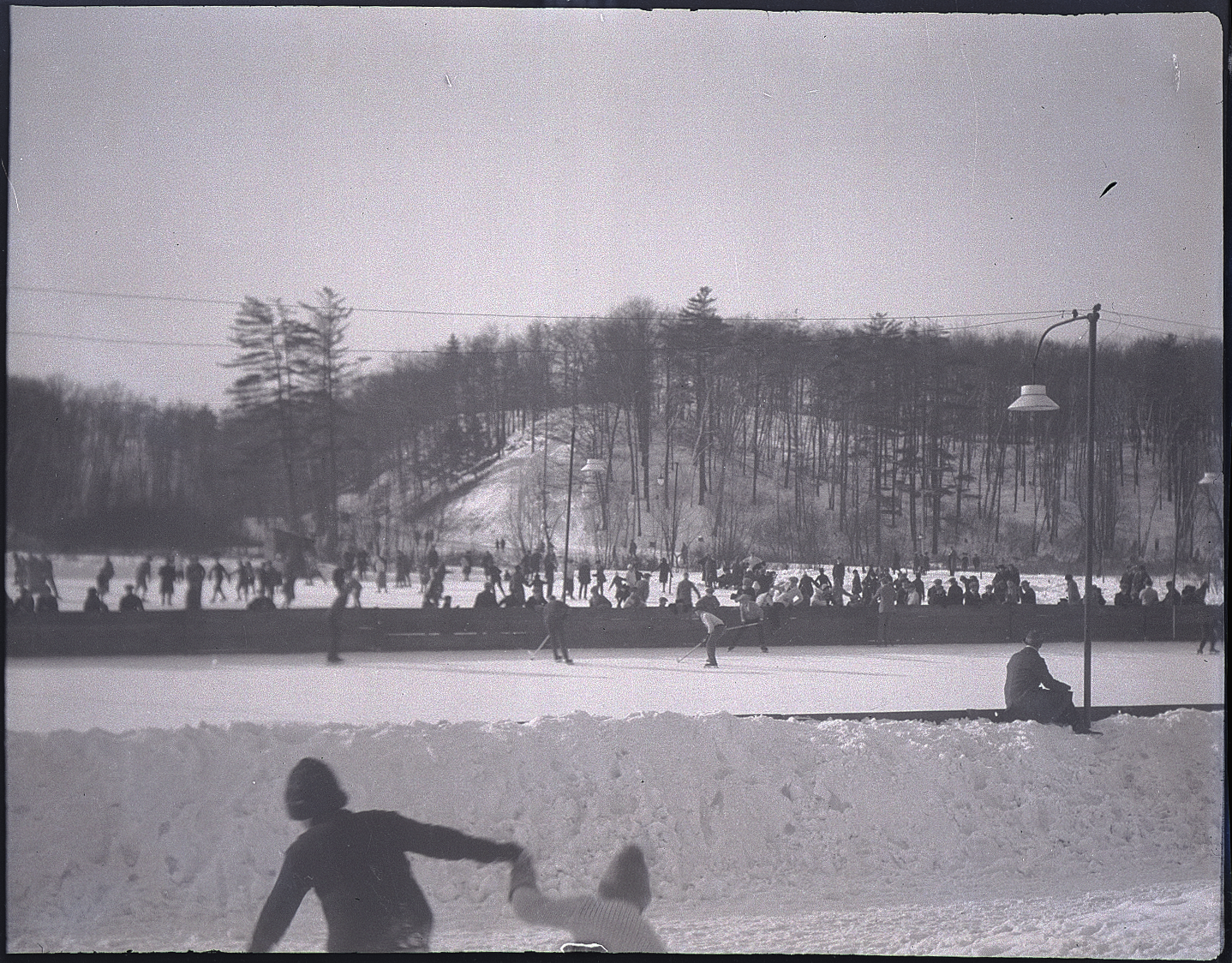
A hockey game in High Park, Toronto, taken in January 1925, from the M.O. Hammond fonds held at the Archives of Ontario.

A municipal swimming complex is open during the summertime, with a water slide, a splash pad and a shallow wading area. As of 2008, there is no admittance fee for its use. The pool is supervised by lifeguards.

Skating on Grenadier Pond was banned by the Toronto Parks Department starting in 2001, but it remained a favourite skating location for Torontonians in the west end of the city for skating and shinny. In the past, the "old" City of Toronto flooded the surface from holes drilled in the ice and cleared areas for rinks. In 2015, Toronto City Council voted to fund a $25,000 ice monitoring program and legalize skating again. A record cold winter in 2015 had seen many people skating on the ice despite bylaw officers attempting to write $125 tickets. Ice conditions are now monitored annually by the City of Toronto Parks and Recreation staff and the ice condition posted on the City of Toronto's website. Grenadier Pond is the only open body of water on which skating is permitted by the City of Toronto.

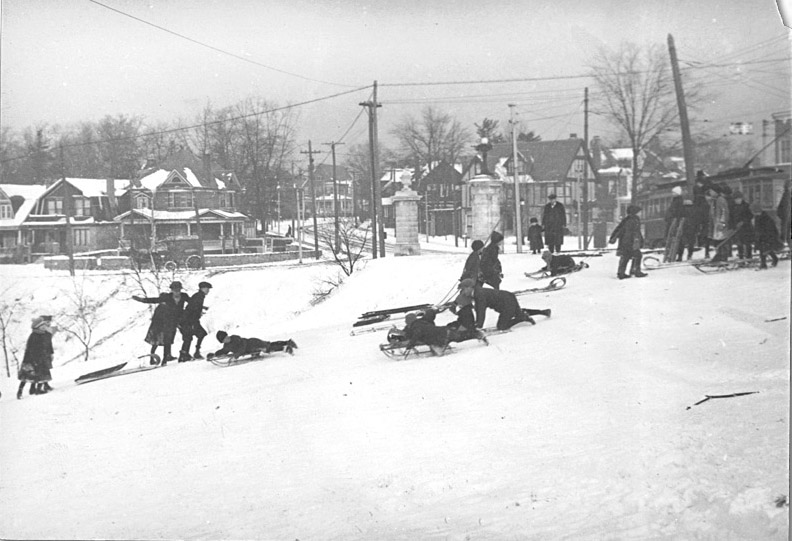
Tobogganing at High Park, 1918. The activity remains a popular activity in certain areas of High Park.

Tobogganing used to be a popular pastime in the park. It is only done now at the hill at Howard Park Avenue and Parkside Drive. Several toboggan runs existed in the past in the hillside gardens area, and the "bowl" at the bottom of an old toboggan run still exists just east of Grenadier Pond, to the north-west of Grenadier Cafe, for a run that started at West Road and ended at the bowl next to the pond. The run is no longer used and trees block the run.

=== Sports facilities ===
In the central area of the park, there are two soccer fields and three baseball diamonds available for organized play. One of the baseball diamonds is home to the High Park baseball organization, providing "Little League" organized baseball programs for children. The smallest diamond is for T-Ball play and the larger field behind the little league diamond is for older players. Next to the little league diamond is the High Park swimming pool. In the winter, an ice hockey ice rink is operated to the north of High Park Pool. The rink was refurbished in 2009 after donations by the Toronto Maple Leafs and retailer The Home Depot.

There are several tennis courts in two separate locations. There are concrete courts along Colborne Lodge Road, to the north of the Pool, operated by the High Park Tennis Club. Along Parkside Drive, between Howard Park Avenue and Bloor Street, is a set of tennis courts and a club house, operated by the Howard Park Tennis Club.

High Park was used for cycling events for the 2017 Invictus Games, replacing Toronto Islands which was still recovering from flooding during the spring and summer.

== Friends of the Park ==
The Volunteer Stewardship Program (VSP) is a volunteer group working with City of Toronto Urban Forestry and Horticulture staff, to protect and restore the remaining natural areas of High Park including large areas of Savannah with Black Oak trees and related flora and fauna. Spring, summer and fall activities include planting, collecting seeds, and removing invasive species from restoration sites. There are educational presentations and some greenhouse work in winter. The High Park Natural Environment Committee volunteer committee advises the city on environmental issues in the park. The groups have developed a web site highparknature.org with extensive information about High Park.

== Surrounding neighbourhoods ==
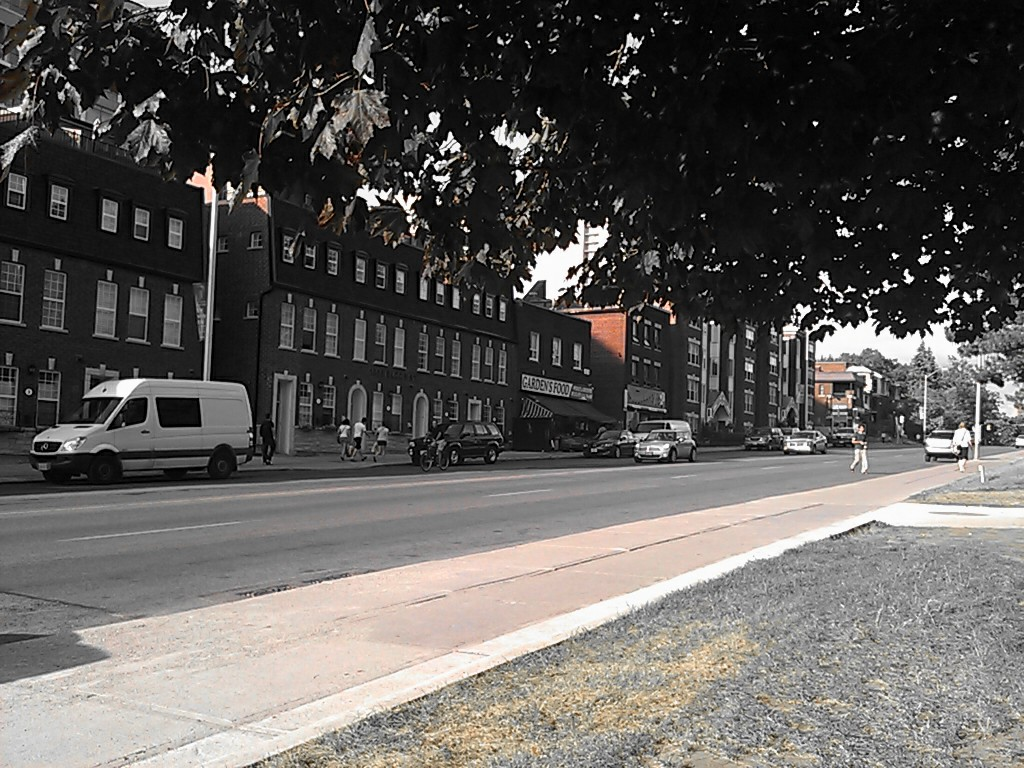
View of High Park North from Bloor Street, the northern boundary of High Park. High Park North is the neighbourhood adjacent to High Park.

High Park also lends its name to two neighbourhood names used by the City of Toronto, "High Park–Swansea" and "High Park North" adjoining the Park. High Park-Swansea encompasses the area west of Roncesvalles Avenue, to Bloor Street on the north, and the Humber River on the west, which includes High Park itself. High Park North encompasses the area to the east of Runnymede Road, north of Bloor Street, north to Annette Street and Humberside Avenue, and east to the CNR/CPR railway lines east of Dundas Street.

High Park North is within the boundaries of the former town of West Toronto Junction. These areas were developed in the decades following 1900 and are mainly detached or semi-detached homes. North of High Park, the area has seen extensive developer activity, including several large apartment towers. Residents to the north and east of the park normally call their neighbourhood High Park.

To the west is Swansea, which was once a village based around a metal works. To the south of High Park is the Sunnyside shoreline on Lake Ontario. Along the lake are beaches, several playgrounds, wading pools, Gus Ryder Pool and Sunnyside Bathing Pavilion. The area east of High Park, and south of Bloor Street, is also known as Roncesvalles.

== Monuments and sculptures ==
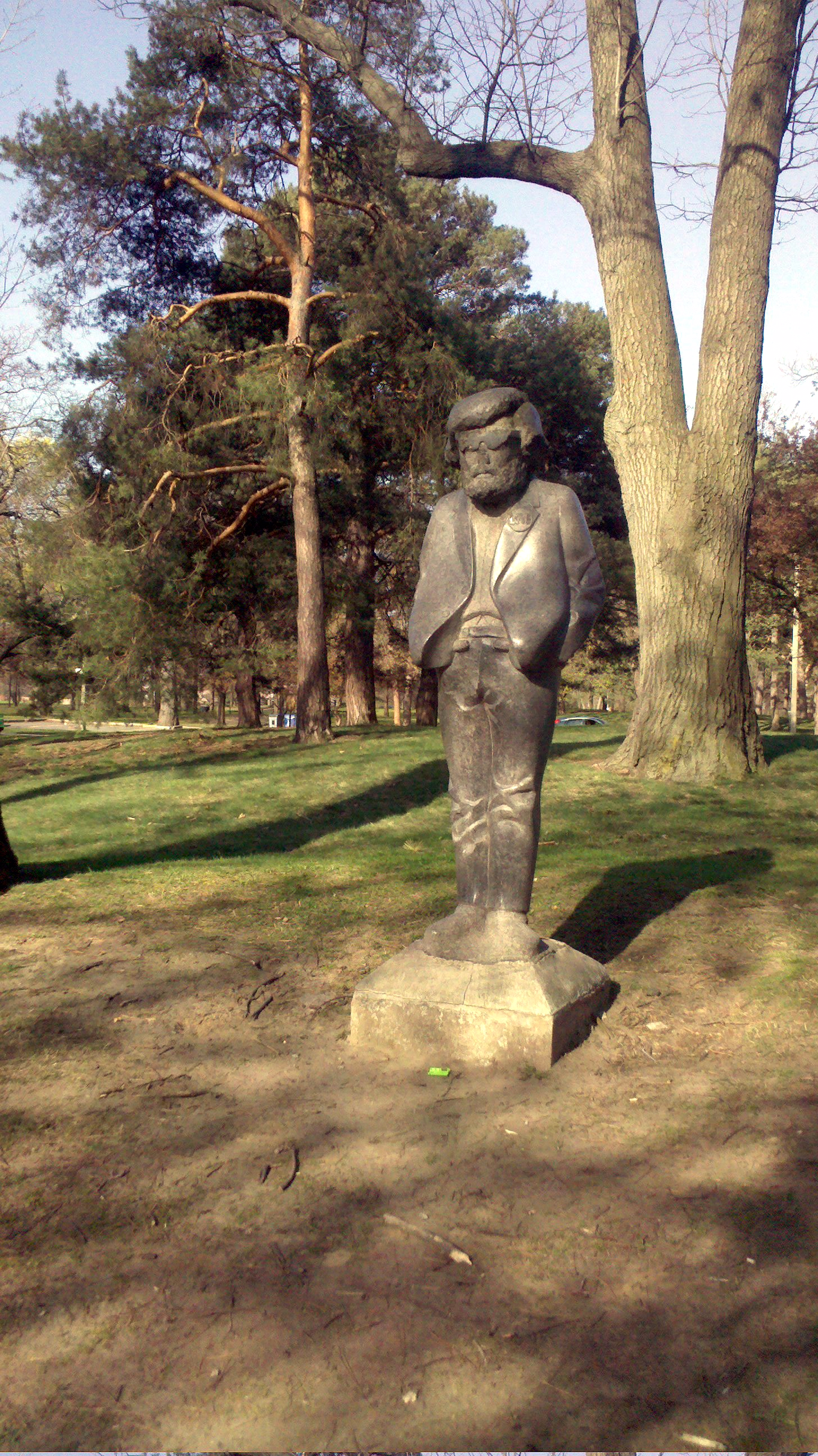
The Hippie by William Koochin, 1967, one of several sculptures in High Park.

- Monument to John G. and Jemima Howard, benefactors of the park
- Lesya Ukrainka monument, Mykhailo Chereshniovsky, 1975
- Portuguese stone cross (padrão), 25th Anniversary of the Portuguese Community in Canada 1953 to 1978, 1978

In 1967, an area east of Colborne Lodge Road, south of Bloor Street, was the site of the Toronto International Sculpture Symposium and had numerous sculptures installed. Five of the original ten permanent pieces remain in High Park:

- The Hippie, William Koochin, 1967
- Midsummer Night's Dream, Wessel Couzijn, 1967
- November Pyramid, Bernard Schottlander, 1967
- The Temple, Hubert Dalwood, 1967
- Three Discs, Menashe Kadishman, 1967

== In popular media ==
High Park is one of the central settings in the 2015 prize-winning novel Fifteen Dogs by Canadian novelist, André Alexis.

== Access ==
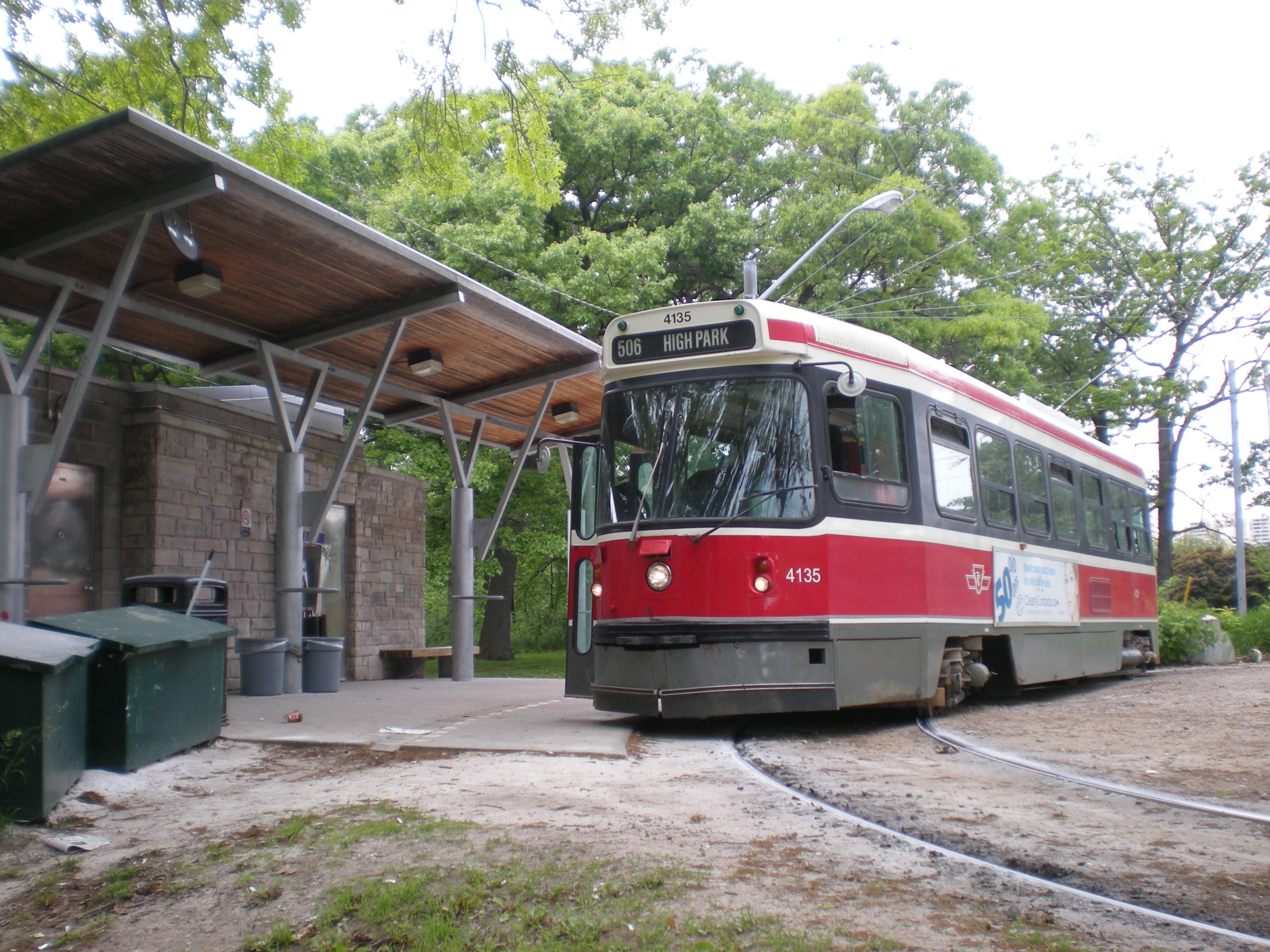
Toronto Transit Commission streetcar at High Park Loop.

High Park is accessible by TTC:

- The High Park and Keele subway stations on the Bloor–Danforth subway line
- The 501 streetcar, 506 streetcar and 80 Queensway bus routes
- The 203 High Park bus loops inside the park from Victoria Day to Labour Day

Automobile access is allowed to most of the park, although several roads are closed to vehicular traffic. Parking lots exist at the Bell playground and zoo, at Colborne Lodge, at Grenadier Cafe, High Park pool and the north-western children's playground, as well as along some roads. On weekends, the roads are closed to traffic. Colborne Lodge Road does not allow through traffic from The Queensway beyond the parking lot for the lodge.

People can walk or bicycle to the park along roads and streets and enter from the neighbourhood. They can take the Martin Goodman Trail along Lake Ontario to points south of the park.

== See also ==
- List of Toronto parks
- Riverdale Farm
- Toronto Zoo
