= John George Howard =

Canadian engineer

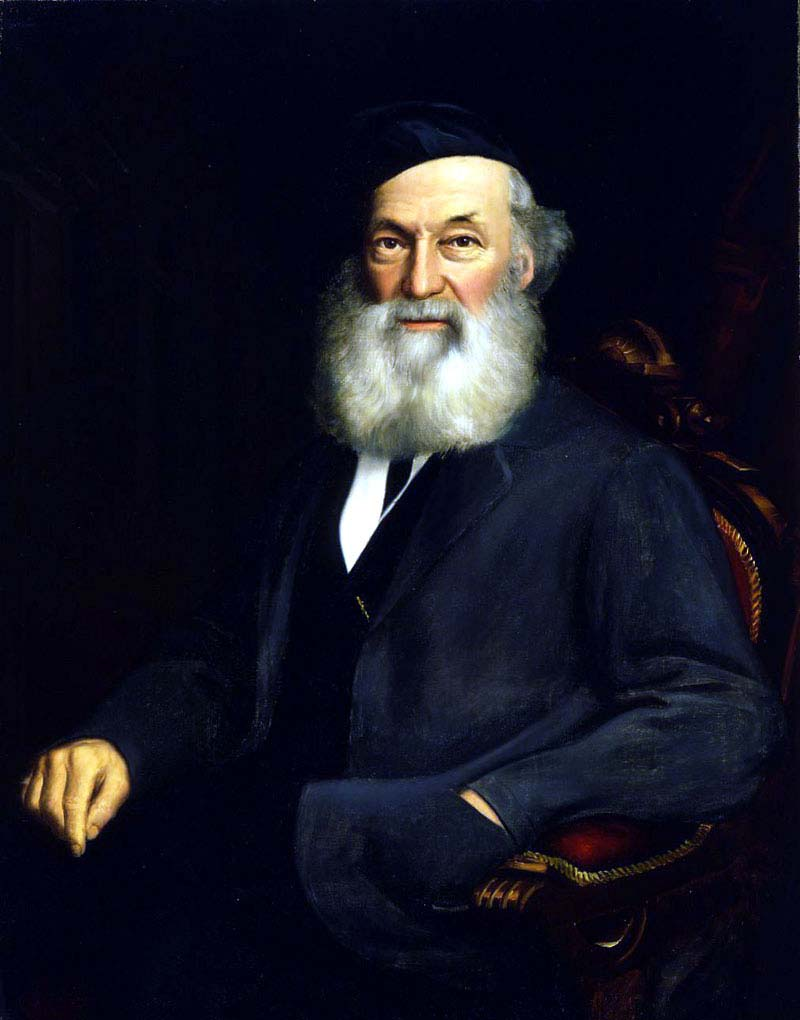
- Portrait of Howard in 1875
- Born: John Corby; July 27, 1803; Bengeo, Hertfordshire, England
- Died: February 3, 1890 (aged 86); Colborne Lodge, Toronto, Ontario
- Occupation: Architect
- Practice: William Ford (1824–1832)
- Buildings: Colborne Lodge

John George Howard (born John Corby; July 27, 1803 – February 3, 1890) was the official surveyor and civil engineer for the government of Toronto in Upper Canada and later Canada. He was also the first professional architect in Toronto. He designed numerous public, commercial and residential buildings during the 19th century. In addition, he was the principal donor of High Park to the people of Toronto.

== Personal life ==
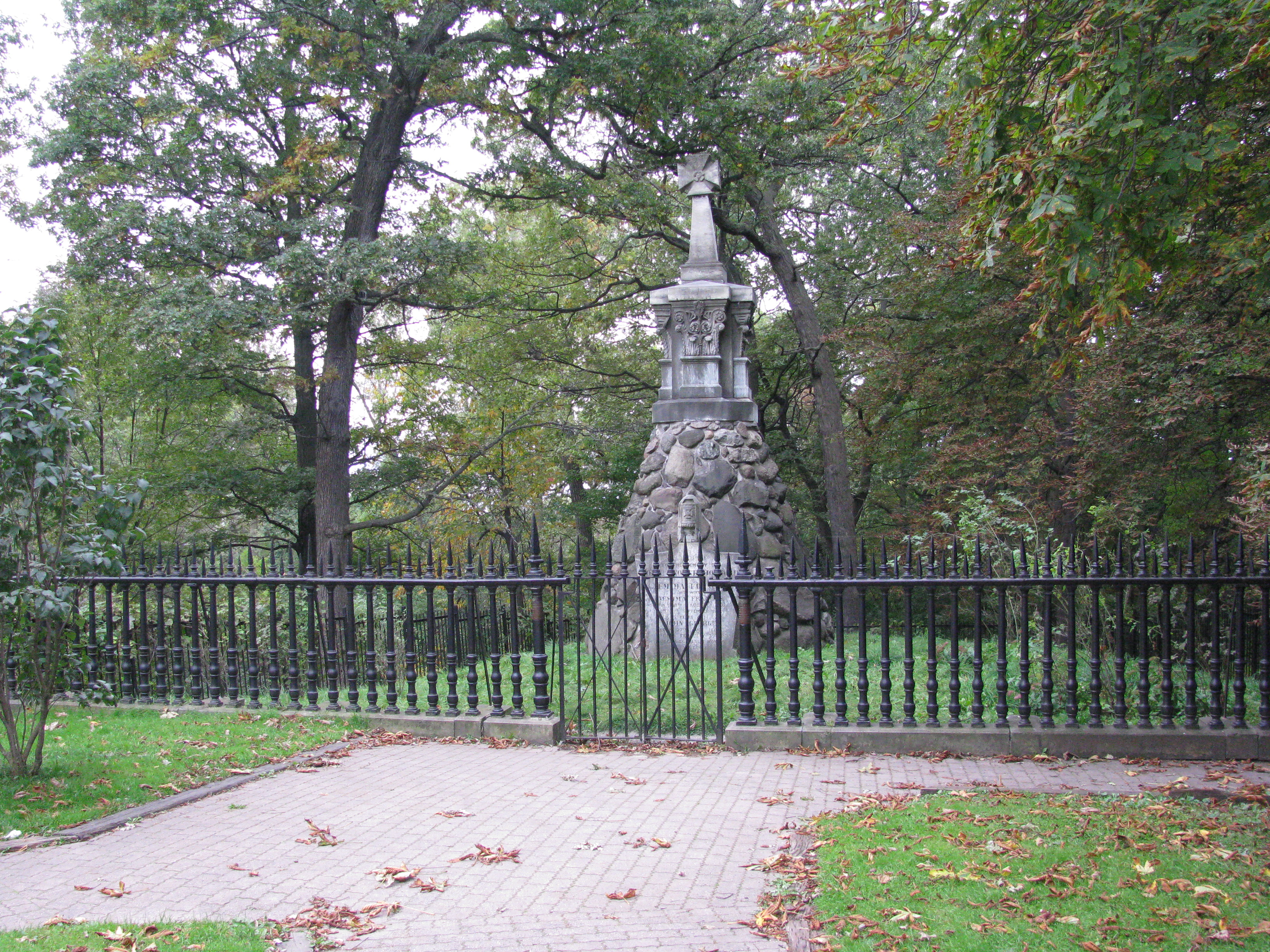
The tomb of John and Jemima Howard near their home, Colborne Lodge

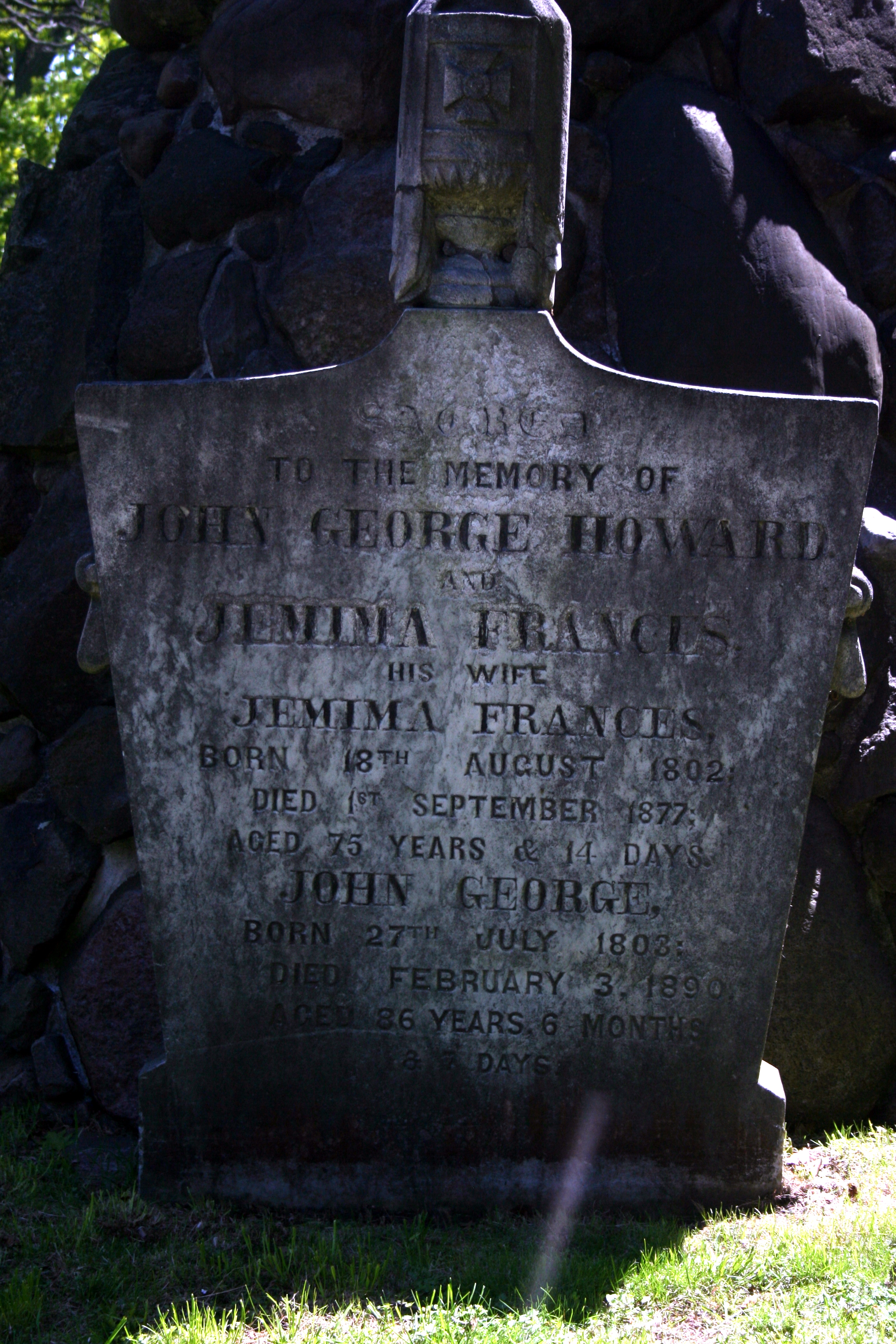
Gravestone of John and Jemima Howard

Born as John Corby in Bengeo, Hertfordshire, England, he was the fourth of seven children of John and Sarah Corby. He attended a boarding school in Hertford and spent two years at sea as a sailor before returning to England to become a carpenter and joiner. In 1824, he entered the architecture profession, articling for three years with a London architect, William Ford, who became his brother-in-law by marrying his older sister in 1825. He remained with Ford until his departure for Upper Canada. In London, he married the 24-year-old Jemima Frances Meikle on May 7, 1827.

In 1832, he met Mr. Cattermole of the Canada Land Company, leading to him immigrating to Upper Canada with his wife in 1832. It was at this time that he adopted the Howard surname. He himself gave two explanations. On February 11, 1834, when his change of name was revealed in a court case, he wrote to Lieutenant Governor Sir John Colborne's secretary, explaining that he was illegitimate, that when he was about 18 he had adopted the name Corby after the man his mother had subsequently married, and that he had assumed his 'proper name' when he left England. Later in life, he claimed direct descent from Thomas Howard, 4th Duke of Norfolk, through a 17th-century Howard who had adopted the name Corby from the ancestral estate Corby Castle, because of a family quarrel.

Howard and his wife remained married until her death, although he also maintained a lifelong relationship with Mary Williams, with whom he had three children. Howard and his wife had no children together. In 1877, Jemima Howard died of cancer. Howard lived until 1890, dying at his home, Colborne Lodge, in High Park.

The Howards are buried in High Park, and their cairn monument is near to Colborne Lodge. The monument was designed by Howard. The fence was brought from London, England. It dates to the 1700s and was formerly part of the fence around St Paul's Cathedral in London, which was designed by Christopher Wren. During its transport from England, the ship carrying the fence sank in the St. Lawrence River, and Howard arranged for the fence to be salvaged from the wreck.

== Professional career ==
Howard was an associate of William Ford from 1824 to 1832, with one notable engineering project working on the Cromford Canal in Derbyshire, England. He is also known to have worked for Mr. Grayson of St. Luke's, London, superintending work on Leeds Castle.

When Howard arrived in Toronto (at that time still the town of York) in 1833, he was the first professional architect in the town. His first public appointment was as a teaching master at Upper Canada College (UCC), while developing an architectural practice. He remained affiliated with UCC until 1856. His practice thrived, with commissions ranging from cottages to banks to public projects, including Queen's College at Kingston, Ontario, and the Provincial Lunatic Asylum in Toronto (modeled on the National Gallery in London).

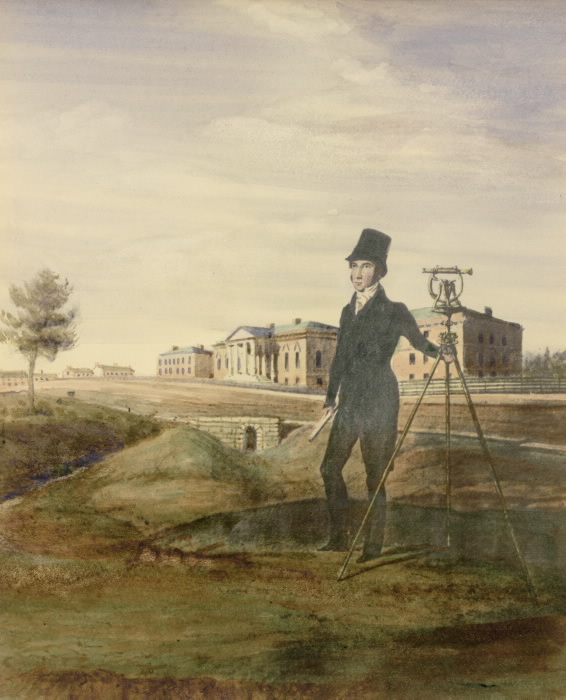
John George Howard in front of the Toronto Court and Gaol (1835)

Howard started surveying work in 1836, and he became Toronto's official surveyor in 1843, a position he held until 1855. He surveyed Toronto Harbour, laid out the 'Esplanade' on the waterfront, and subdivided the harbour's peninsula (now known as Toronto Island). He also did surveying work for cemeteries and private land sub-divisions. In 1883, the Governor-General of Canada conferred upon him the dignity of "Royal Canadian Academician."

In other endeavours, Howard was involved with the militia which put down William Lyon Mackenzie's 1837 rebellion. Howard is recorded as leading the scouting party which found the rebels' location on December 7, 1837. He would become a lieutenant the following year. In 1841, Howard received a license to practice as a public notary. In 1847, Howard was named president of a copper mine on Lake Huron. In 1848, Howard served as president and treasurer of the Toronto Society of Arts. In 1853, Howard was appointed a Justice of the Peace for a term of four years.

Howard bought some land of his own, including the property now known as High Park, which he intended as a sheep farm. To the east of High Park, Howard owned Sunnyside Farm, on which he built Sunnyside Villa. It is now the site of St. Joseph's Health Centre. The area retains the nickname of 'Sunnyside'. In 1873, in return for a yearly pension of CA$1,200, Howard deeded 120 acres (49 ha) of his High Park property to the city as a public park. The remaining 45 acres (18 ha) and Colborne Lodge became city property at his death. Howard was appointed as forest ranger by the city in 1878, with responsibility for improving the park.

== Notable projects ==
Building	Year Completed	Style	Location	Image
Thomas Mercer Jones Villa by Howard	1833	Regency	Toronto, Ontario	
William Henry Draper Villa by Howard	1834	Regency	Toronto, Ontario	
Canada Company Office built by Howard	1834	Regency	Frederick Street between King and Front, Toronto, Ontario	John George Howard's Canada Company Office
Colborne Lodge by Howard	1837	Regency	Colborne Lodge Drive, just north of the Queensway - High Park, Toronto, Ontario	
Home District Gaol; Howard, architect.	1837–1841 demolished 1887	Regency	Southeast corner of Front and Berkeley Streets, Toronto, Ontario	
James McDonell Store built by Howard	1839	Regency	Church Street, Toronto, Ontario	
Chewett's Block built by Howard	1833 (demolished 1946 and now Standard Life Centre)	Regency	southeast corner of York Street and King Street, Toronto, Ontario	Chewett Building, designed by John George Howard
William Hume Blake House "Woodlawn" by Howard	1840–41	Regency	35 Woodlawn Avenue West, Toronto, Ontario	
Victoria Row (later the Albany Club) by Howard	1840–1842; altered 1860s	Regency	91 King Street East at Church Street, Toronto, Ontario	
St. John's Church, York Mills by Howard	1842–1843	Gothic	19 Don Ridge Road, North York, Ontario	
William Augustus Baldwin House "Mashquoteh" by Howard	1850	Regency	Avenue Road near Heath Street, Toronto, Ontario	
Bank of British North America built by Howard	1856	Regency	Yonge and Wellington Streets, Toronto, Ontario	
Union Mills, Weston built by Howard	1860s	Regency	Lawrence Avenue West and Weston Road (Side Line and High Street), Toronto, Ontario	
Provincial Lunatic Asylum built by Howard	1860 (demolished 1970s)	Regency	999 Queen St, Toronto, Ontario	Ontario Asylum

== Paintings by John George Howard ==
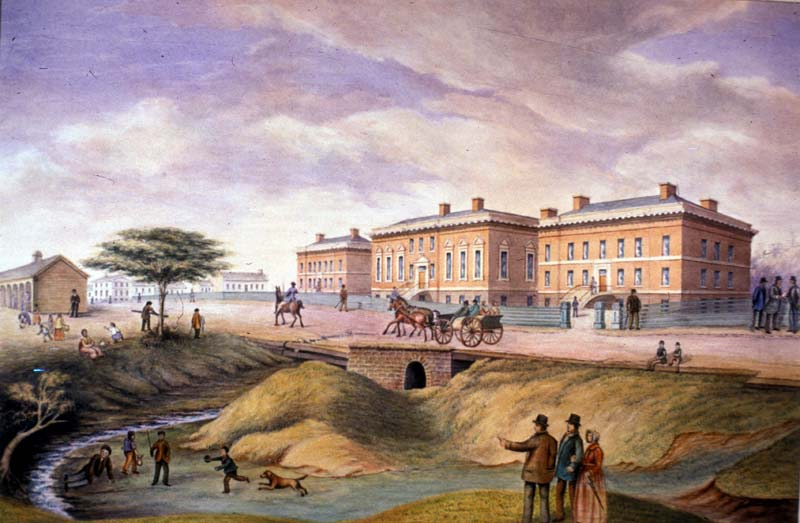
Third Parliament Buildings 1834

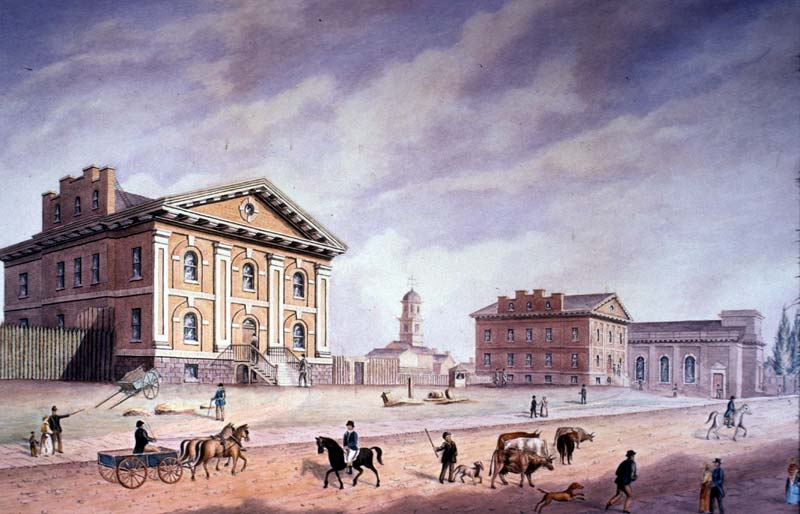
North side of King Street from Toronto to Church Streets 1835

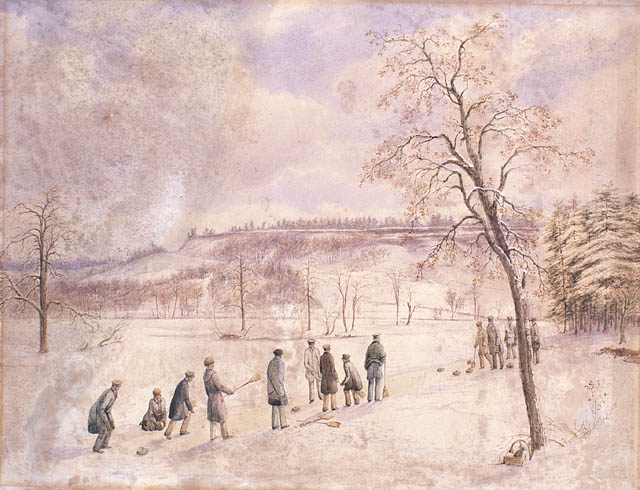
Curling in High Park 1836

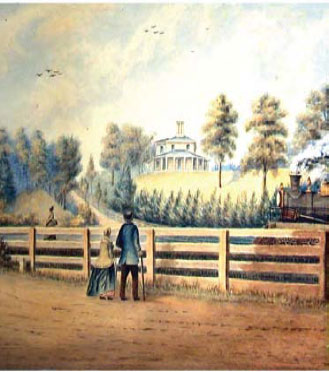
Colborne Lodge 1865

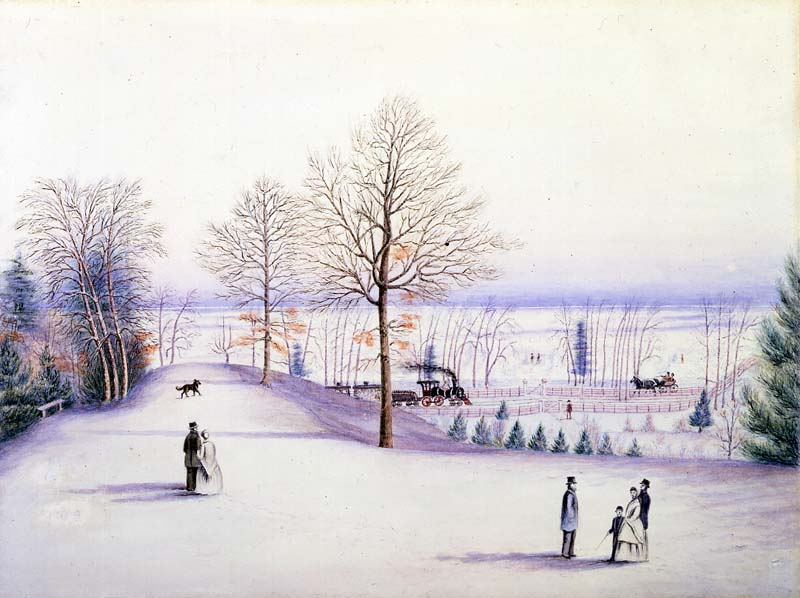
Looking south from Colborne Lodge 1870

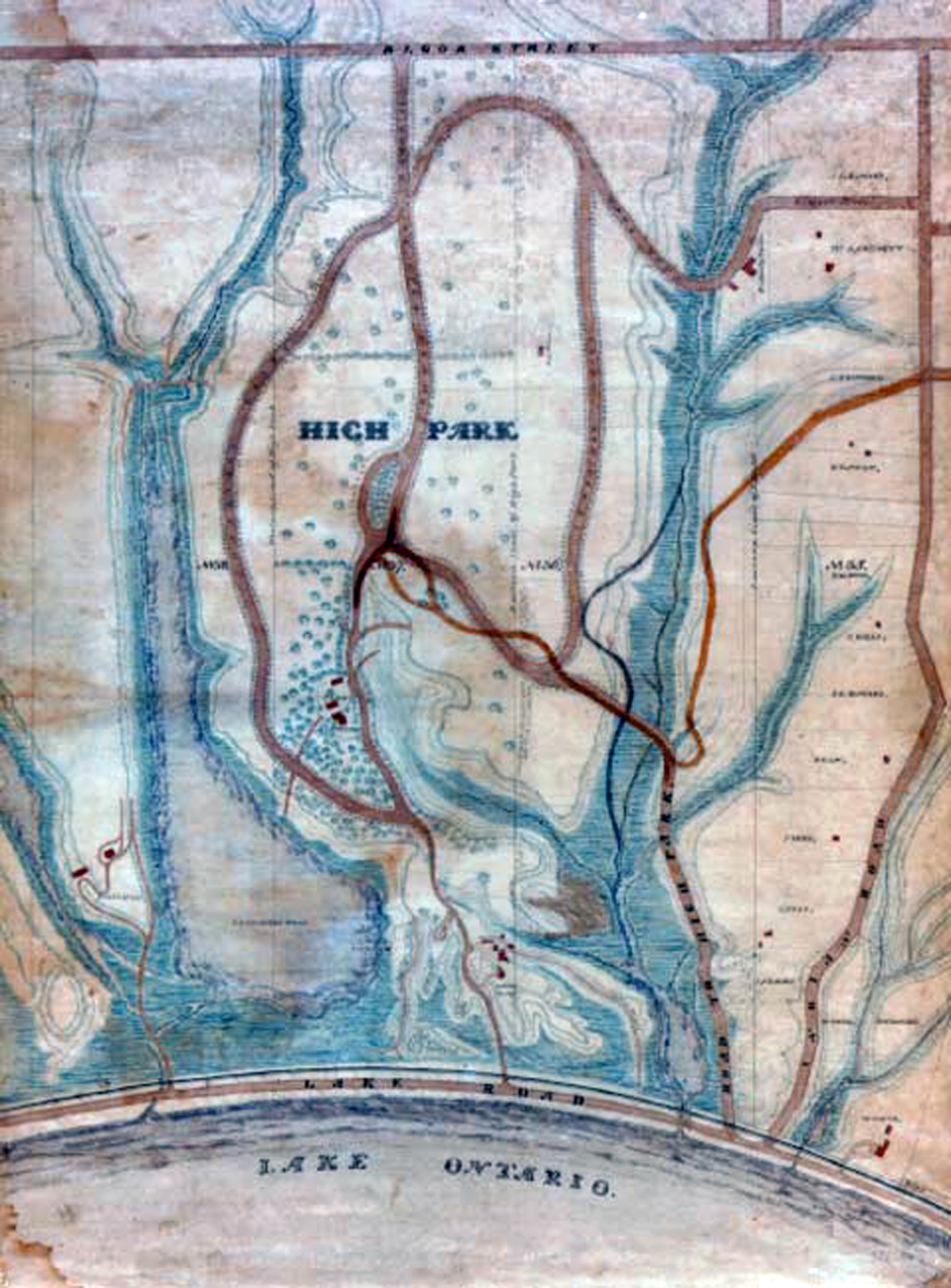
High Park 1870s map
