= Albany Club =

Social club in Toronto, Ontario, Canada

Coordinates: 43.649673°N 79.374859°W

- Founded: 27 October 1882; 143 years ago
- Type: Private members' club
- Location(s): 91 King Street East Toronto, Ontario, Canada
- Website: albanyclub.ca

The Albany Club in Toronto, Ontario, was founded in 1882 and is one of Canada's oldest private social clubs. Named after Queen Victoria's youngest son, the Duke of Albany, the club has been situated at its present location of 91 King Street East since 1898.

== Overview ==
According to the club's prospectus, it views itself as: "The exclusive social and business club for those who influence, celebrate, debate, and promote Canada's conservative and political history, ideals, values and leadership."

The club is traditionally seen as a home for Conservative supporters. Its members have included every Conservative prime minister from Sir John A. Macdonald to Stephen Harper. Members have also included Ontario Conservative premiers Sir James Whitney, Sir William Hearst, Howard Ferguson, George Henry, Thomas Kennedy, George A. Drew, Leslie Frost, John Robarts, Bill Davis, Frank Miller and Mike Harris.

== Clubhouse ==
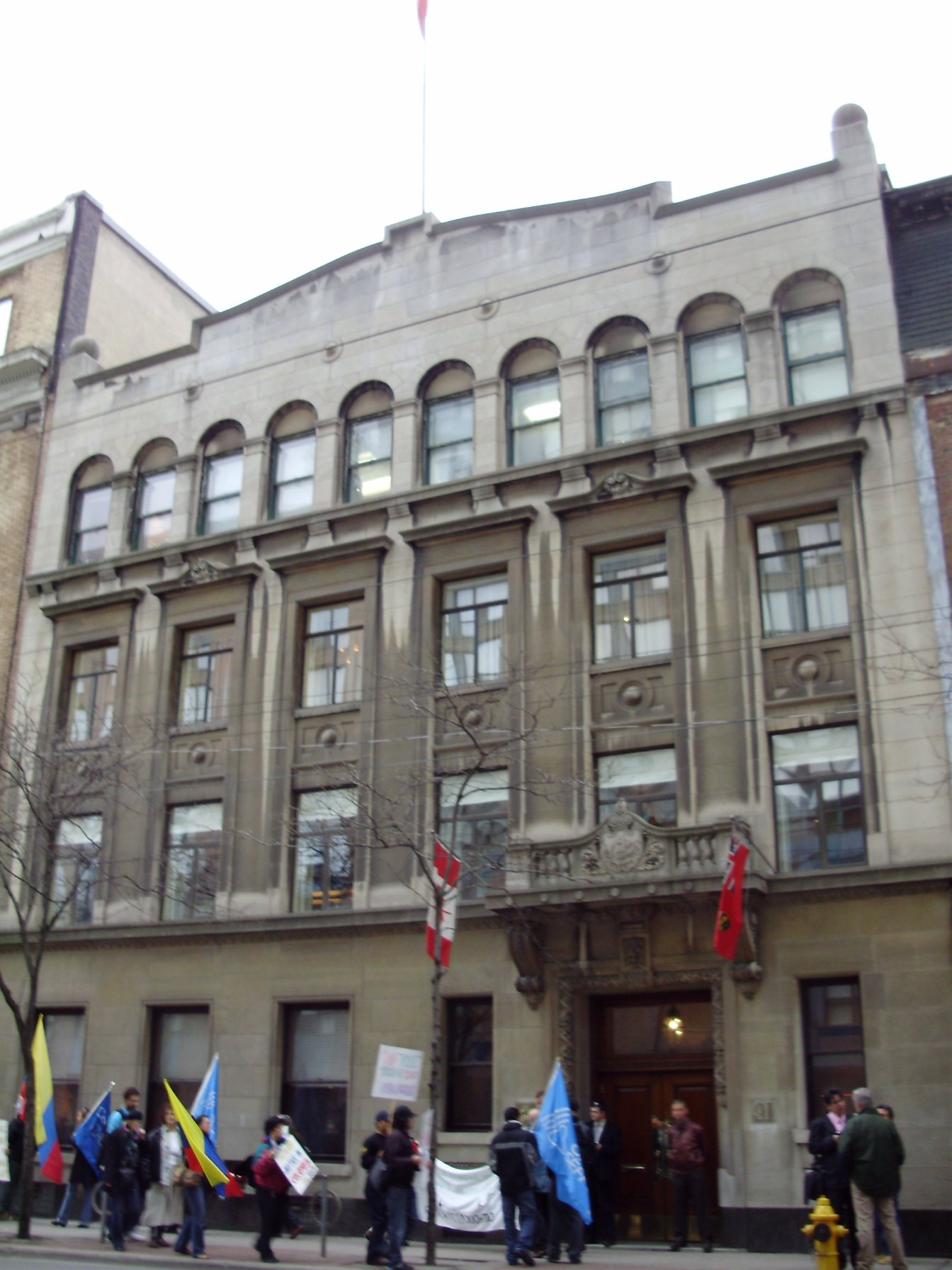
The front facade of the clubhouse, located at 91 King Street East

The current clubhouse at 91 King Street East was designed by Charles J. Gibson (1862–1935) and completed in the early 1930s. Its west side is directly adjacent to the last remaining portion of "Victoria Row", which was originally constructed by John George Howard from 1840 to 1842 as a commercial building. The remainder of that site has been redeveloped as part of the 65 King Street East office tower, which preserved the historic facades along King Street.

The club was closed to members for much of the 2020 coronavirus pandemic.

== See also ==
- List of gentlemen's clubs in Canada
- Royal eponyms in Canada
