= College station (Toronto) =

Toronto subway station

College
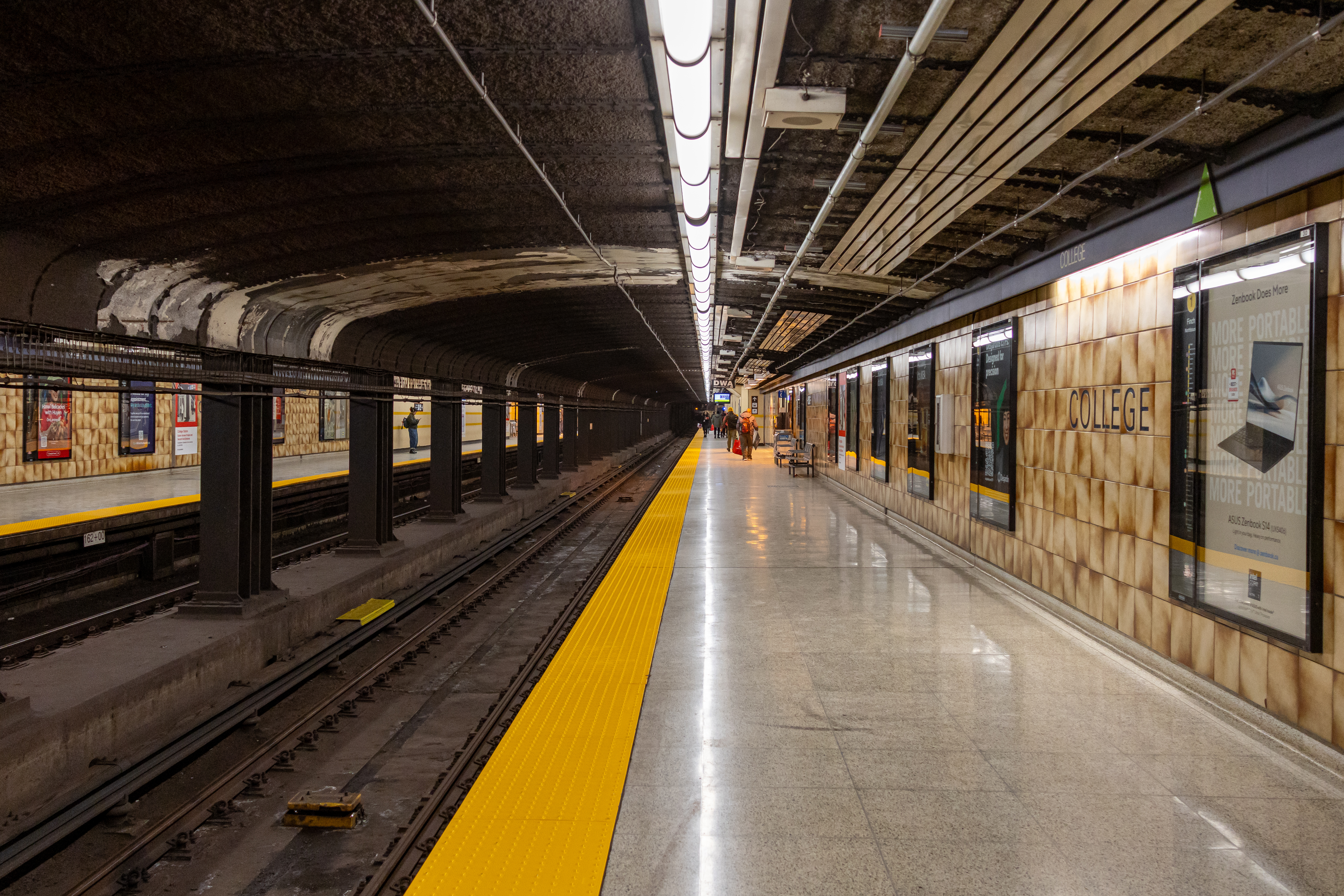

General information
- Location: 3 Carlton Street; Toronto, Ontario; Canada
- Coordinates: 43°39′38″N 79°22′58″W
- Platforms: Side platforms
- Tracks: 2
- Connections: TTC buses and Streetcars: 97 Yonge; 306 Carlton; 320 Yonge; 506 Carlton

Construction
- Structure type: Underground
- Accessible: Yes

Other information
- Website: Official station page

History
- Opened: March 30, 1954; 72 years ago

Passengers
- 2023–2024: 39,137
- Rank: 10 of 70

Services
Preceding station	Toronto Transit Commission	Following station
TMU towards Vaughan	Line 1 Yonge–University	Wellesley towards Finch
Location

College is a subway station on Line 1 Yonge–University in Toronto, Ontario, Canada. It is located at Yonge Street and College Street/Carlton Street.

== History ==
College station opened in 1954 as part of the original stretch of the Yonge line from Union to Eglinton stations. The address originally given to the station was 448 Yonge Street, which is still used on Toronto Transit Commission (TTC) system maps, but the TTC official website uses 3 Carlton Street.

== Station description ==
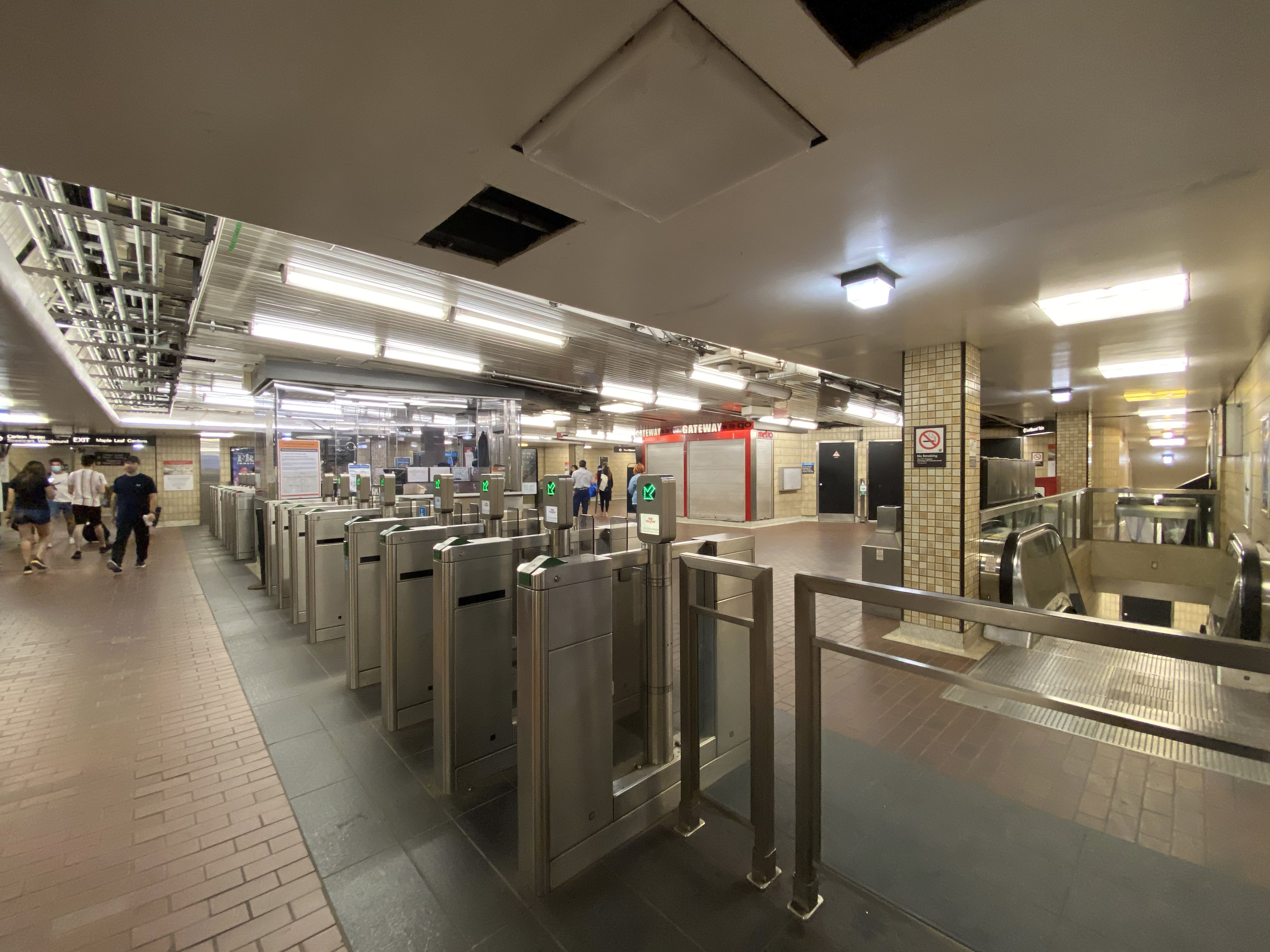
College station concourse

The station lies under Yonge Street south from College and Carlton streets. The entrances on the northeast and southeast corners of the intersection are stairwells directly from the sidewalk. At the southwest corner the entrance is through the former Eaton's store at College Park, with escalators connecting from the street and additional stairs to the station. These three entrances join to the concourse, below the street at the north end of the station, where the collector's booth, turnstiles and a Gateway Newstands are located. Below this, on the lowest level, are the two side platforms which can be reached by escalators and stairs. Further south of the existing stairs and escalators, there are newer stairs and elevators that go up to the new concourse leading into College Park, which opened to the public on November 5, 2026, making this station fully accessible.

== Station access upgrades ==
Second station concourse with elevators

In 2022, work began on a second entrance at College station. The second entrance is located south of the main entrance, and riders can access it from the basement level of the College Park building. The second entrance has a concourse level under Yonge Street with Presto fare gates and an elevator and a staircase to each of the north- and southbound platforms. These elevators connect to the street-level concourse. Riders are able to use the College Park elevators from street level and a passage to reach the new concourse where riders can use either a short staircase or a ramp to enter the concourse. Construction was completed in the second quarter of 2026, but the station did not become fully accessible until November 5, 2026.

== Architecture and art ==
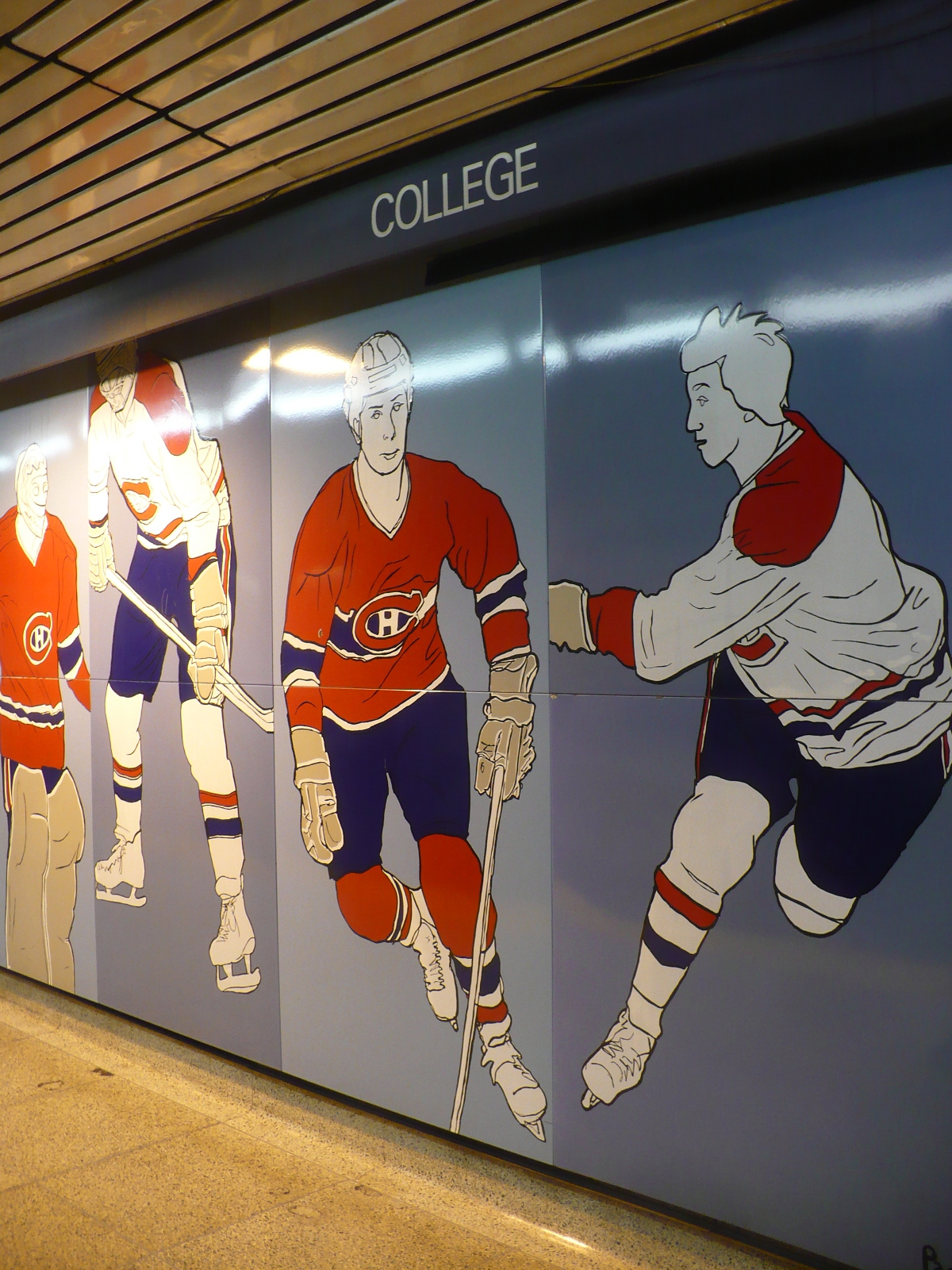
Hockey Nights in Canada by Charles Pachter

The station features Hockey Knights in Canada, a pair of murals that are named after Hockey Night in Canada; one depicting the Toronto Maple Leafs on the southbound side and facing the Montreal Canadiens on the northbound side, depicting the decades-old rivalry between the two clubs. They were created by Charles Pachter in 1984, when the Toronto Maple Leafs still played at nearby Maple Leaf Gardens.

Before proceeding with the design, the TTC sought to obtain permission from both clubs. The Canadiens agreed as did Maple Leaf general manager Gerry McNamara. However, when Maple Leafs owner Harold Ballard learned of the plan to feature both teams, he refused permission to use the Leafs insignia unless plans for the Canadiens mural were scrapped. The TTC thus moved to remove the logos from the murals, until chairman Julian Porter, himself a lawyer knowledgeable on copyright issues, intervened and decided to take Ballard to court, believing that the artistic works could make free use of the logo even without Ballard's permission. TTC commissioner June Rowlands also intervened insisting that all the players wear helmets, to set an example of safety for the city's youth.

== Subway infrastructure in the vicinity ==
North of the station, the tunnel turns off-street, paralleling Yonge Street to the east. South of the station, the subway continues under Yonge Street to TMU station.

In early 2011, the TTC began work to re-install a double crossover south of the station. The crossover will allow trains to turn back at the station, allowing for more flexibility during emergencies. The crossover had existed from the day the subway opened until the mid-1980s when it was removed due to financial, maintenance and safety concerns and because it was not regularly used. The original crossover was not powered or signaled, meaning that supervisory personnel had to be on scene to manually operate the switches, and ensure safe train passage. On November 21, 2020, automatic train control was activated at College station, allowing the crossover to be remotely operated for train turnbacks.

== Nearby landmarks ==
Nearby landmarks include the College Park mall, the College Park courts, the Residences of College Park, the Toronto Police Headquarters, and Maple Leaf Gardens.

== Surface connections ==
A transfer is required to connect between the subway system and these surface routes:

TTC routes serving the station include:

Route	Name	Additional information
97C	Yonge	Northbound to Eglinton station and southbound to Union station (Rush hour service)
306	Carlton	Blue Night Streetcar service; eastbound to Main Street station and westbound to High Park Loop
320	Yonge	Blue Night service; northbound to Steeles Avenue and southbound to Queens Quay
506	Carlton	Streetcar; eastbound to Main Street station and westbound to High Park Loop
