= Toronto streetcar system loops =

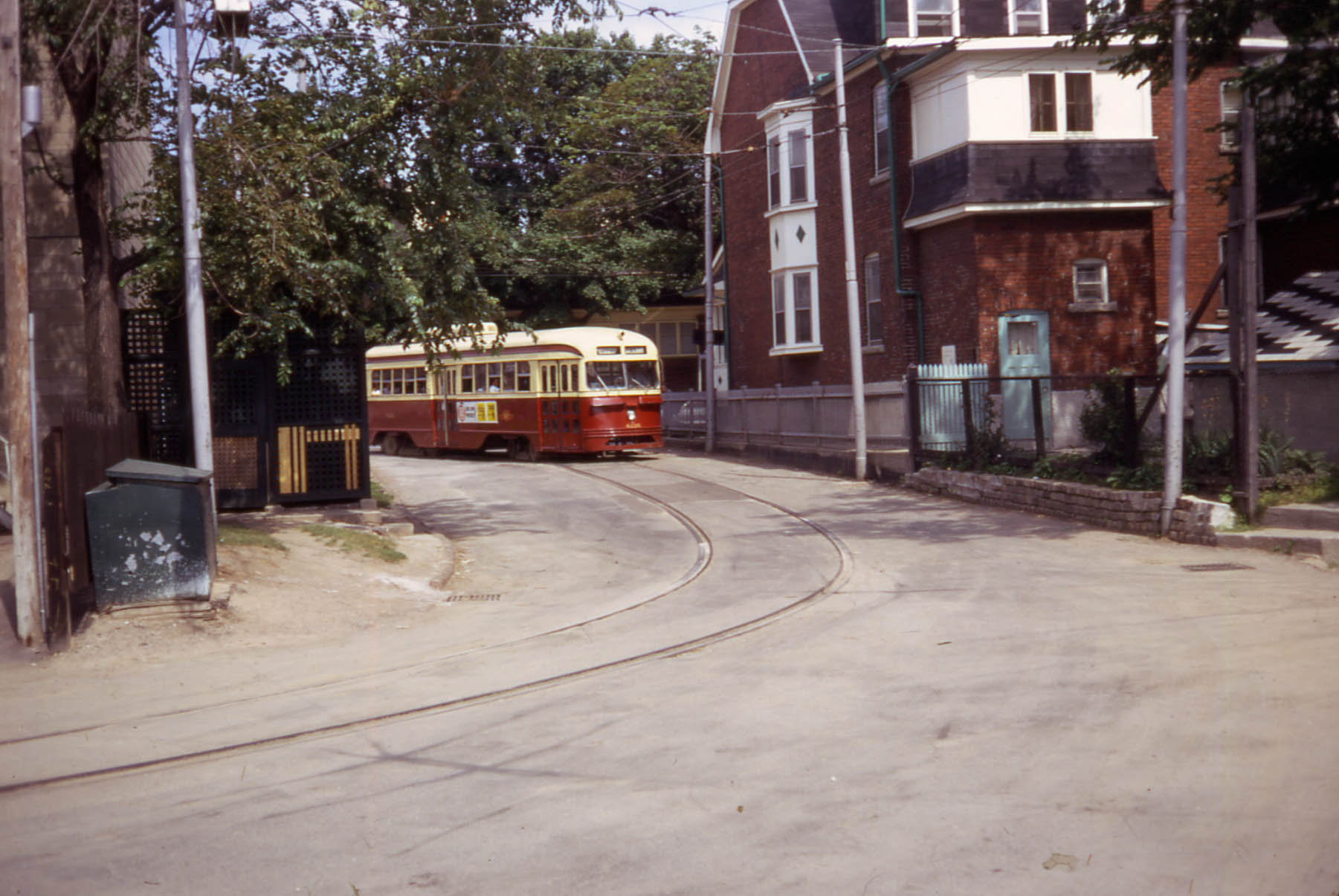
Air-electric PCC 4226 at Earlscourt Loop in 1968

Turning loops of the Toronto streetcar system serve as termini and turnback points for streetcar routes in Toronto, Ontario, Canada. The single-ended streetcars require track loops in order to reverse direction. Besides short off-street track loops these can also be larger interchange points, having shelters and driver facilities, or be part of a subway station structure for convenient passenger interchange.

Some loops include separate unloading and loading stops, some have a single stop, and some off-street loops have no stops and passengers are not allowed to ride around the loop. If streetcars loop clockwise, the track entering the loop must cross over the track exiting, and any loading or unloading platforms must be inside the loop; if anticlockwise, any platforms must be on the outside.

Almost all loops on the system have a minimum radius of curvature of less than 15 metres (49.2 ft). The tightest curves are of 11.3 metres (37.1 ft) at Roncesvalles Carhouse and Russell Carhouse. The streetcars themselves are designed for a minimum radius of 10.973 metres (36 ft).

== Loops as of 2025 ==
Loops have various shapes according to the space available. For example, the "loop" track may actually be mostly straight, using on-street trackage to complete the looping motion (as at Bingham Loop, Dufferin Gate Loop, or Oakwood Loop), or there may be a single sharp curve through almost three-quarters of a circle (as at Union Station Loop or Wolseley Loop).

Some loops consist only of a single track and are blocked when occupied by a stopped streetcar. Others have a side track or dead-end "tail track" where a streetcar can wait, or a track that allows a streetcar on the loop to make a complete circle (or equivalent) and reenter the loop.

=== Loops at subway stations ===
==== Bathurst station loop ====
Bathurst station features an anticlockwise loop, which is the northern terminus of the 511 Bathurst route, on the east side of Bathurst Street north of Bloor Street. The tracks continue north of the station to connect to the Hillcrest Complex and St. Clair Avenue. Streetcars can enter or leave the station from/onto Bathurst either northbound or southbound. The minimum radius of curvature for this loop is 12.8 m (42 ft).

==== Broadview station loop ====
Broadview station features an anticlockwise loop, which is the eastern terminus of the 504B King, 505 Dundas, and 508 Lake Shore routes, on the east side of Broadview Avenue north of Danforth Avenue. The loop track splits into two, one for each route. All streetcars enter the station from Broadview northbound and exit onto Erindale Avenue westbound, leading to Broadview southbound.

==== Dundas West station loop ====
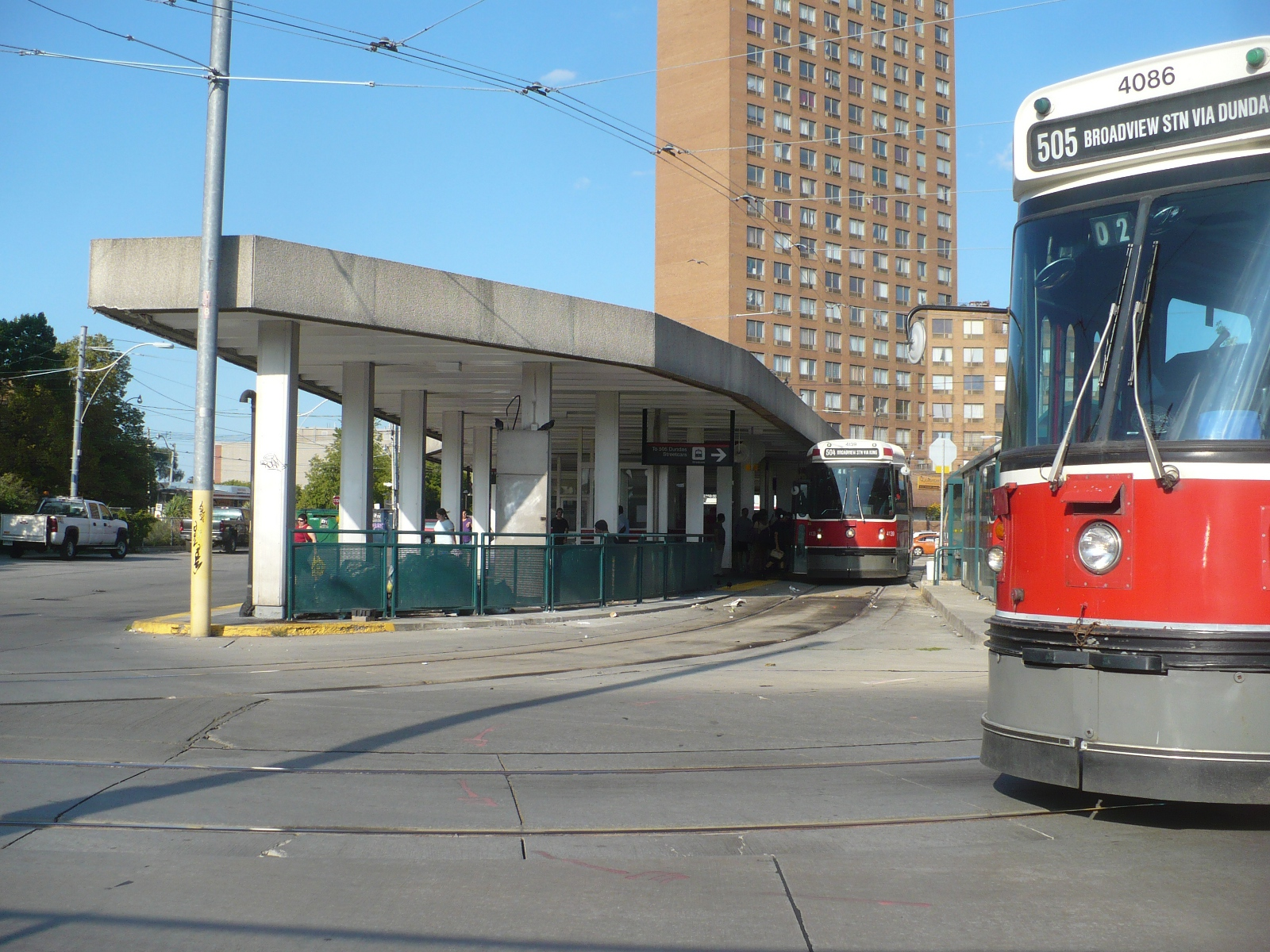
CLRV streetcars seen in the separate branches of the Dundas West loop in 2012

Dundas West station features a clockwise loop, which is the western terminus of the 504A King and 505 Dundas routes, on the west (nominally south) side of Dundas Street north of Bloor Street. The loop track splits into two, one for each route. All streetcars enter the station from Dundas northbound (nominally westbound), and exit onto Edna Avenue eastbound, leading to Dundas southbound. The minimum radius of curvature for this loop is 12.2 m (40 ft). The loop was formerly used by trolley buses on route 40 from 1968 to 1991.

==== Main Street station loop ====
Main Street station features a clockwise loop, which is the eastern terminus of the 506 Carlton route, on the east side of Main Street north of Danforth Avenue. All streetcars enter the station from Main northbound, and exit onto Main southbound.

==== Spadina station loop ====
Spadina station features an anticlockwise underground loop, which is the northern terminus of the 510 Spadina route, on the east side of Spadina Road north of Bloor Street A tunnel runs from Spadina Avenue and Washington Avenue to the station. All streetcars enter the tunnel northbound on Spadina, turn eastbound under Bloor, northbound under Madison Avenue, and westbound into the station; they exit southbound under Spadina Road and Avenue.

==== St. Clair station loop ====
St. Clair station features an anticlockwise loop, which is the eastern terminus of the 512 St. Clair route, on the south side of St. Clair Avenue east of Yonge Street. All streetcars enter the station from St. Clair eastbound, and exit onto St. Clair westbound. The loop was formerly used by trolley buses on route 74 from 1977 to 1991.

==== St. Clair West station loop ====
St. Clair West station features a clockwise underground loop, an intermediate stop and possible turnback point on the 512 St. Clair route, on the north side of St. Clair Avenue two blocks east of Bathurst Street. Before the introduction of the longer Flexity cars, there were separate unloading, eastbound loading, and westbound loading stops on the same track; now there are only two stops, eastbound and westbound. A side track enables eastbound cars to bypass the westbound stop. A tunnel runs under St. Clair from Wells Hill Avenue halfway to Tweedsmuir Avenue. Streetcars can enter or leave the station from/into this tunnel either eastbound or westbound. The minimum radius of curvature for this loop is 12.8 m (42 ft).

==== Union station loop ====
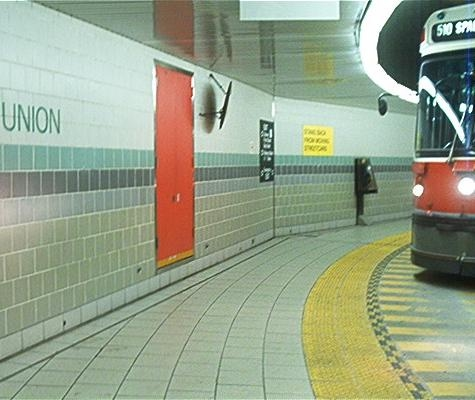
Streetcar underground on the Union Station Loop

Union station features an anticlockwise underground loop. It is the eastern terminus of the 509 Harbourfront and southern terminus of the 510 Spadina route. A tunnel runs under Bay Street from Queens Quay station. All streetcars enter the station from the tunnel northbound and exit into the tunnel southbound. The minimum radius of curvature for this loop is 14.5 m (48 ft).

=== Loops at carhouses ===
==== Roncesvalles Carhouse loop ====
Roncesvalles Carhouse has a clockwise loop through the Roncesvalles Carhouse trackage, at Roncesvalles Avenue and the Queensway, located at 43°38′21.5″N 79°26′48.0″W. It is a possible turnback point for westbound 501 Queen and for 504 King in either direction. Streetcars on King or Queen westbound or Roncesvalles southbound can run onto the Queensway westbound, then turn northbound to enter the loop. They can exit the loop onto Roncesvalles Avenue northbound or southbound, with the latter leading onto the Queensway westbound or King or Queen eastbound. The minimum radius of curvature for carhouse trackwork is 11.3 m (37 ft).

No passenger access.

==== Russell Carhouse loop ====
There is an anticlockwise loop around the traffic office at the corner of Connaught Avenue and Queen Street East that can turn streetcars approaching from the west along Queen Street. There is clockwise looping for streetcars approaching from either east or west along Queen Street via Connaught Avenue, Eastern Avenue, north through the yard tracks returning either to Connaught Avenue or directly onto Queen Street. The minimum radius of curvature for the carhouse trackwork is 11.3 m (37 ft).

No passenger access, no use by buses.

=== Other off-street loops ===
==== Bingham Loop ====
Bingham is an anticlockwise loop northwest of Kingston Road and Victoria Park Avenue. It is the eastern terminus for 503 Kingston Road streetcars. Prior to mid-2013, it was possible for operators using the loop to loop-the-loop. Westbound 12 Kingston Road buses enter the loop as an intermediate stop, and when the streetcars are not running, 22A Coxwell or 322 Coxwell Blue Night buses use it as a terminus. The minimum radius of curvature for this loop is 11.9 m (39 ft).

==== Distillery Loop ====
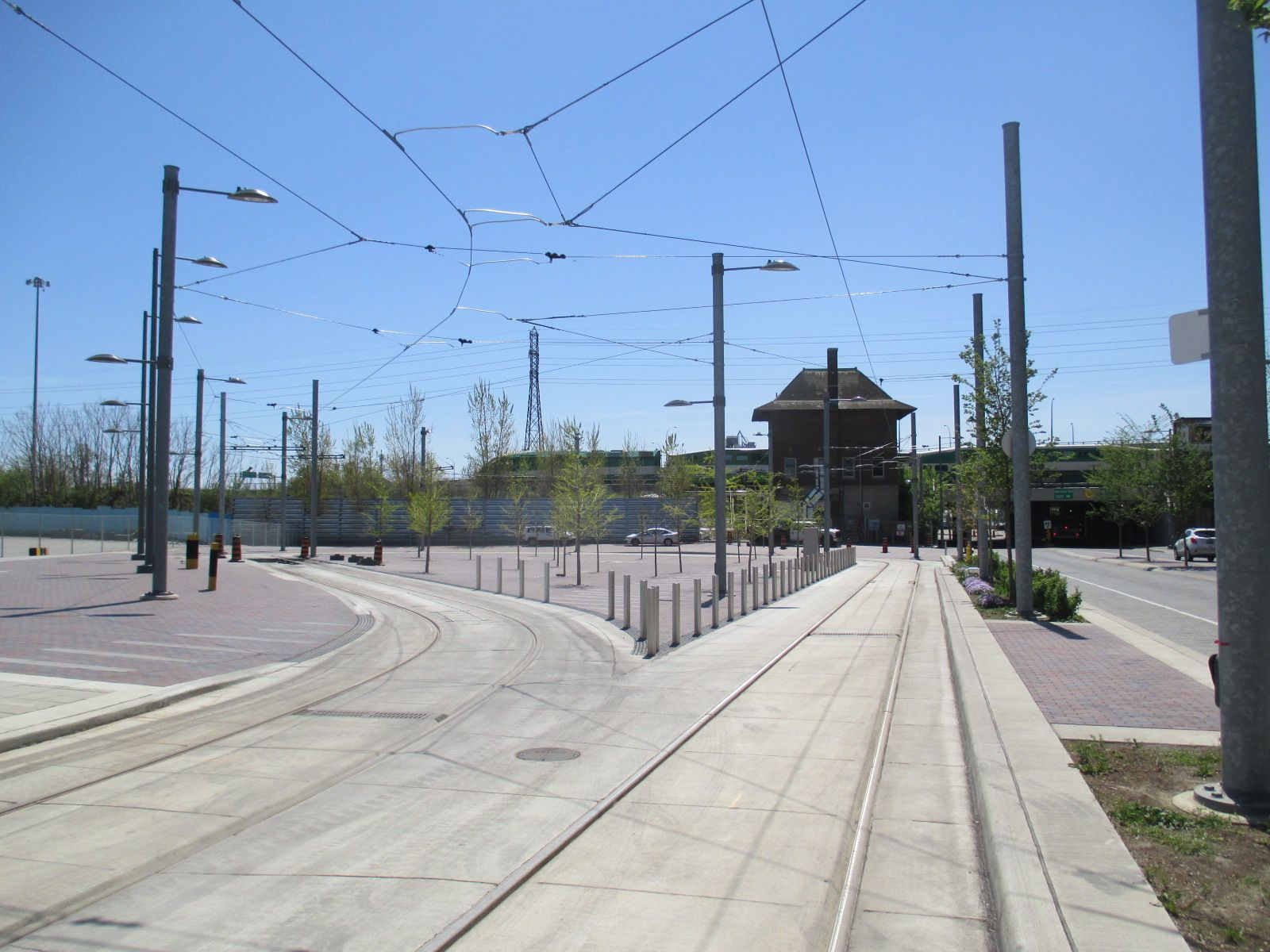
Distillery Loop prior to opening

Distillery is an anticlockwise loop. It is the eastern terminus of the 504A King route, on the east side of Cherry Street opposite Distillery Lane in the Distillery District. The Distillery Loop is at the southern end of the Cherry Street branch, which has a junction with the King Street line at its northern end. With the junction, the Distillery Loop can turn cars coming from either direction along King Street. The loop opened on June 19, 2016.

==== Dufferin Gate Loop ====
Dufferin Gate is an anticlockwise loop northwest of Dufferin Street and the Gardiner Expressway, and is the terminus of the 504B King streetcars. A loop-the-loop manoeuvre is possible. The loop is adjacent to the Dufferin Gates entrance of Exhibition Place.

==== Earlscourt Loop ====
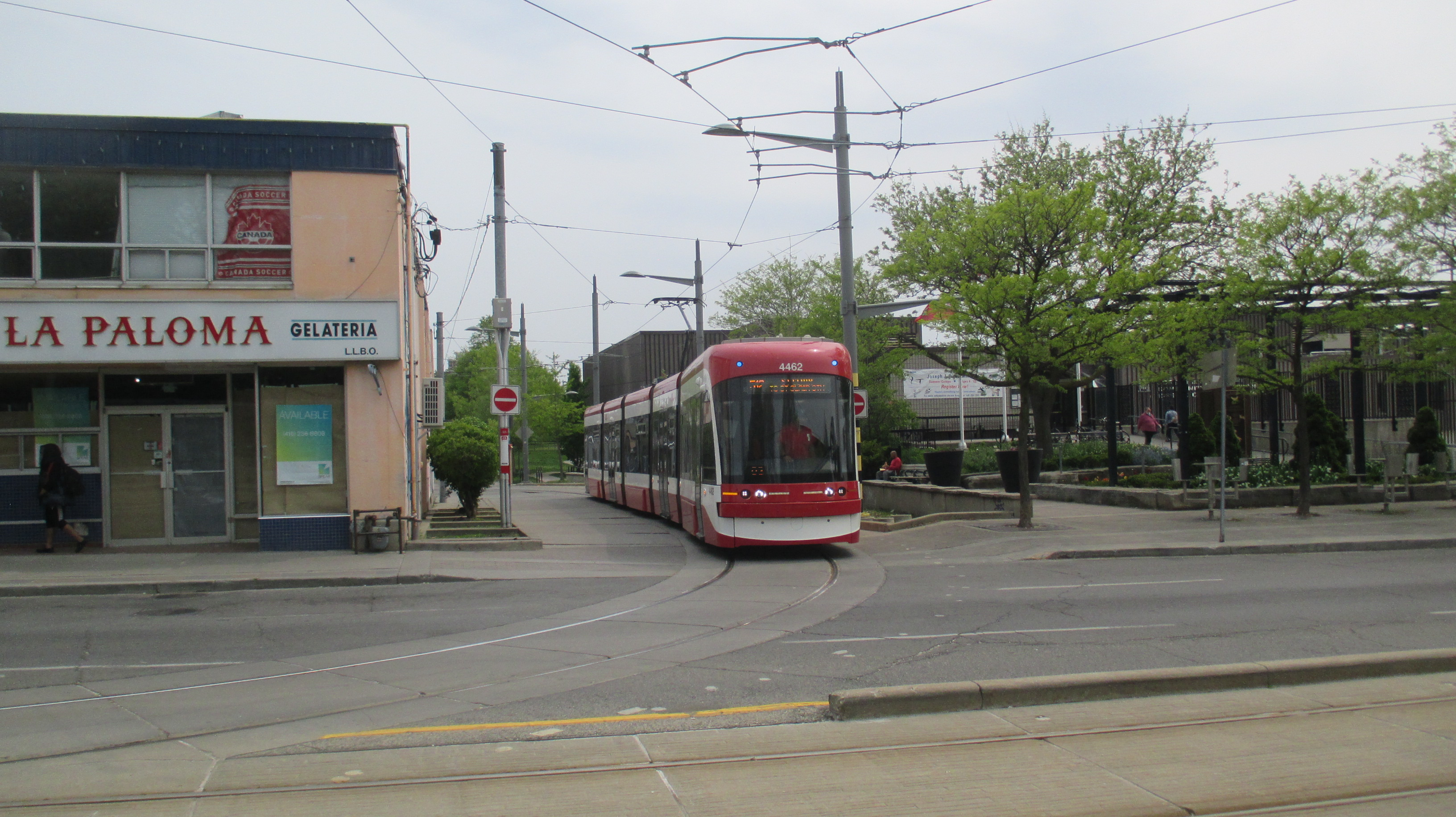
Earlscourt Loop in 2023

Earlscourt is a clockwise loop southwest of St. Clair Avenue and Lansdowne Avenue, located at 43°40′32.5″N 79°27′03.4″W. It is a possible turnback point for westbound 512 St. Clair streetcars and former terminus for 512L St. Clair streetcars. Streetcars from St. Clair in either direction can turn southbound on Lansdowne to enter the loop, and exit onto St. Clair eastbound. The loop was also formerly the terminus of trolley buses serving route 47 from 1947 to 1992.

A cabin is provided for drivers. Northbound 47 Lansdowne buses use the loop to short turn, as regular service terminates further north at Caledonia station.

==== Exhibition Loop ====
Exhibition is an anticlockwise loop northeast of Manitoba Drive and Nova Scotia Avenue. It is the western terminus of the 509 Harbourfront and the southern terminus of the 511 Bathurst route. There is a private right-of-way that runs along the north side of Manitoba from Fleet Street at Strachan Avenue to the loop. From Fleet westbound, all streetcars continue west along the private right-of-way to the loop, where they cross north under the elevated Gardiner Expressway, run west, and cross back south under the expressway before returning eastbound to Fleet.

During the Exhibition, this loop allows access to Exhibition Place and is operated as a fare-paid area with ticket booths and turnstiles. At other times these are closed and it is operated as an ordinary stop. Storage tracks are provided so that extra streetcars can be rapidly dispatched for peak traffic, as well as a passing track allowing the two routes to have separate stopping points without conflict.

Exhibition GO Station is adjacent to the loop. Overnight the 307 Bathurst Blue Night and 363 Ossington Blue Night buses use the loop as their southern terminus.

The loop opened in 1996, replacing a previous Exhibition Loop that could not be used by buses and was on land about to be redeveloped.

==== Fleet Loop ====
Fleet is anticlockwise loop on the south side of Fleet Street west of Bathurst Street, in the angle with Lake Shore Boulevard, and surrounding the Queen's Wharf Lighthouse. There is no passenger access and no bus access.

==== Gunns Loop ====
Gunns is an anticlockwise loop northwest of St. Clair Avenue and at Gunns Road and the western terminus for the 512 St. Clair route. All streetcars westbound on St. Clair turn northbound on Gunns, enter the loop westbound, and exit onto St. Clair eastbound. The minimum radius of curvature for this loop is 13.7 m (45 ft).

==== High Park Loop ====
High Park is an anticlockwise loop west of Parkside Drive, opposite Howard Park Avenue, on the east edge of High Park. It is the western terminus for the 506 Carlton route. All streetcars enter the loop from Howard Park westbound and exit onto Howard Park eastbound.

==== Humber Loop ====
Humber Loop is located just west of the Humber River at the western end of the Queensway private right-of-way. Humber consists of two separate anticlockwise loops: one loop turns cars coming from the east via the Queensway; the other turns cars coming from the west via Lake Shore Boulevard. There is also a double-track through-route that connects the Queensway to Lake Shore Boulevard, bypassing the two loops. Humber Loop is the western terminal for route 501 Queen and the eastern terminal for route 507 Long Branch. It is also a through stop for 501 Queen streetcars operating in late evening to Long Branch Loop and peak-period 508 Lake Shore streetcars operating between Long Branch Loop and Broadview Station.

==== Kipling Loop ====
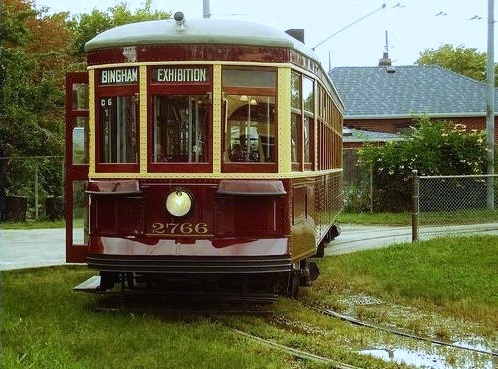
Peter Witt car at Kipling

Kipling is an anticlockwise loop on the west side of Kipling Avenue, north of Lake Shore Boulevard, located at 43°35′55.8″N 79°31′03.3″W. It is a possible turnback point for westbound 501 Queen (during late evenings), 507 Long Branch (during daytime and early evenings), and 508 Lake Shore (during peak periods) streetcars. Streetcars can turn from Lake Shore either eastbound or westbound onto Kipling northbound to enter the loop, and exit onto Kipling southbound, leading to Lake Shore eastbound. The loop was once known as New Toronto Loop.

There is no bus access in this loop, although the 44 Kipling South previously looped here until it was extended to the former Lakeshore Asylum, as well as the 145A Downtown / Humber Bay Express before it was suspended. As of 2025, the loop is used by the 110C Islington South as its southern terminus.

==== Long Branch Loop ====
Long Branch is an anticlockwise loop northwest of Lake Shore Boulevard West and Brown's Line. It is the western terminus for 501 Queen, 507 Long Branch, and 508 Lake Shore routes.

==== McCaul Loop ====
McCaul is an anticlockwise loop northeast of McCaul Street and Stephanie Street. It is the western terminus of the 502 Downtowner and a turnback point for the 501 Queen in either direction. Streetcars travelling both ways on Queen can turn north onto McCaul and then can turn into the loop, exiting onto McCaul southbound to return to Queen either eastbound or westbound. The loop was originally in the open air, but was covered when the Village by the Grange mixed-use development was built over it in 1976. The minimum radius of curvature for this loop is 13.7 m (45 ft).

==== Neville Park Loop ====
Neville Park is an anticlockwise loop southwest of Queen Street east and Nursewood Road; eastern terminus of the 501 Queen route. All streetcars enter the loop from Queen eastbound and exit onto Nursewood northbound to return to Queen westbound. It has no passenger access. It was the eastern terminus of 143 Downtown/Beach Express buses. The minimum radius of curvature for this loop is 13.7 m (45 ft).

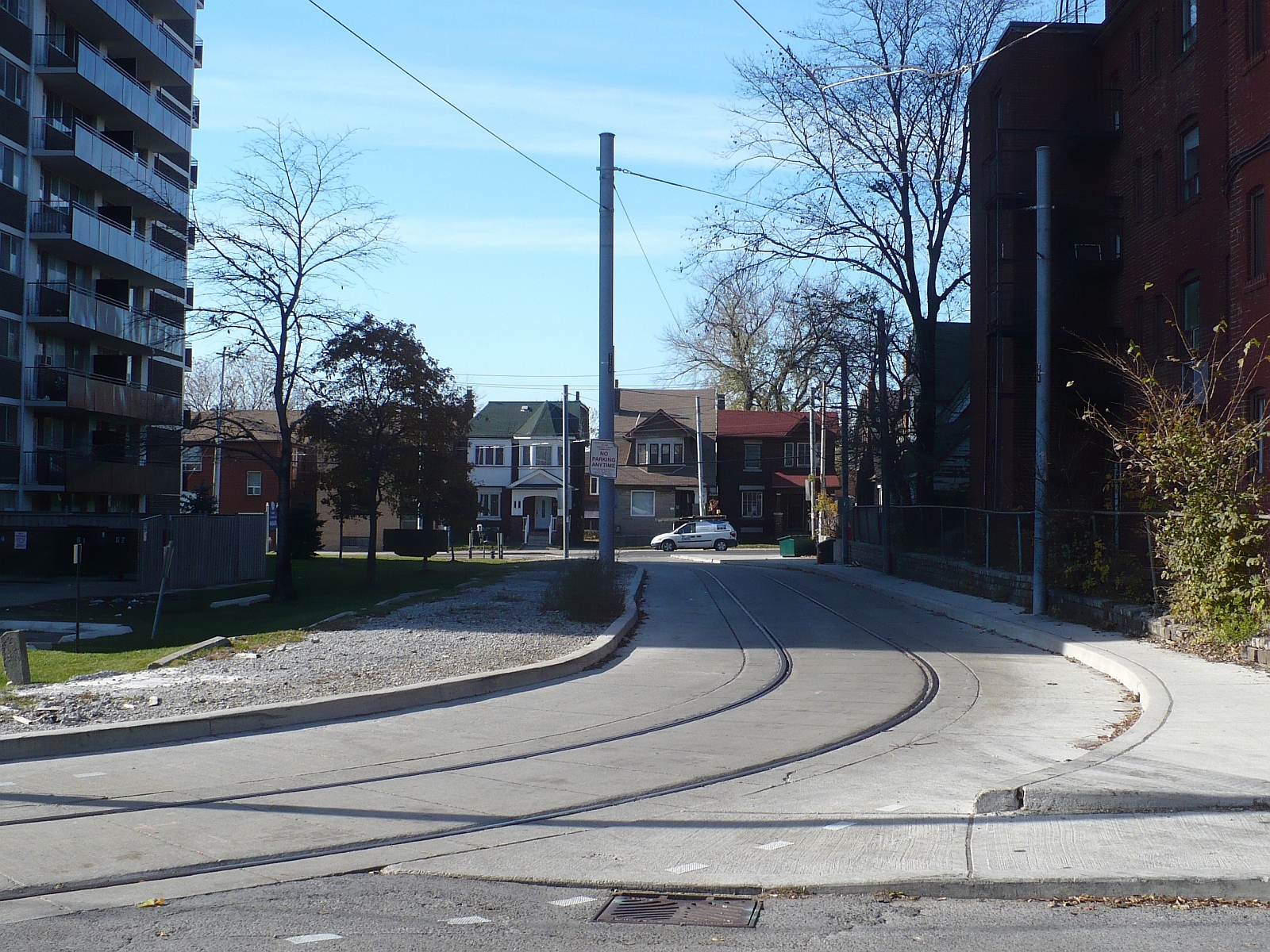
Oakwood Loop

==== Oakwood Loop ====
Oakwood is an anticlockwise loop northeast of St. Clair Avenue and Oakwood Avenue, located at 43°40′50.2″N 79°26′07.8″W. It is a possible turnback point for route 512 St. Clair in either direction. Streetcars either eastbound or westbound on St. Clair can turn northbound onto Robina Avenue, then westbound to enter the loop, exiting onto Oakwood Avenue southbound to return to St. Clair either eastbound or westbound. The loop was formerly used by 63A short turns of trolley buses on route 63 from 1974 to 1992.

No passenger access. Northern terminus of 63B Ossington buses.

==== Queen–Coxwell Loop ====
Queen–Coxwell is a clockwise loop northeast of Queen Street and Coxwell Avenue, located at 43°40′00.4″N 79°18′59.1″W. It is a possible turnback point for route 506 Carlton in either direction. Streetcars either eastbound or westbound on Gerrard Street can turn southbound on Coxwell to reach the loop, then eastbound to enter the loop, exiting onto Queen westbound to return to Coxwell northbound and turn eastbound or westbound onto Gerrard. The loop exit track briefly overlaps the westbound track on Queen but does not connect with it, leading only onto Coxwell northbound.

No passenger access. As of 2025, this loop is not used by buses, although up to the mid-1980s, it was the southern terminus of the Coxwell 22 bus line.

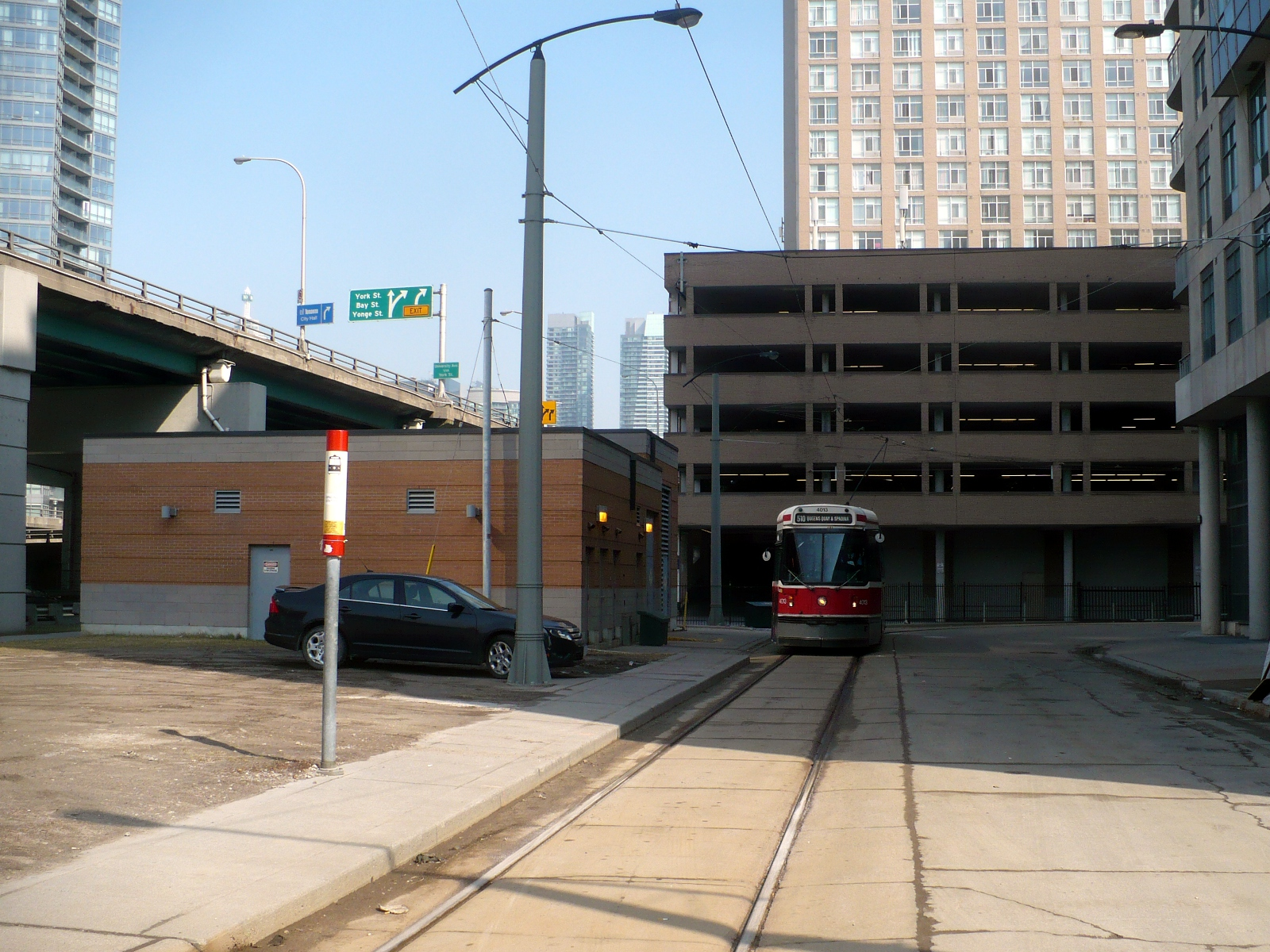
Queens Quay and Spadina

==== Queens Quay and Spadina Loop ====
Queens Quay and Spadina is an anticlockwise loop northeast of Queens Quay and Spadina Ave (entering from the east side of 410 Queens Quay) located at 43°38′18.5″N 79°23′28.5″W. It is a possible turnback point for 509 Harbourfront or 510 Spadina streetcars in either direction. Streetcars southbound on Spadina can turn eastbound on Queens Quay to reach the loop; streetcars eastbound or westbound on Queens Quay can turn northbound into the loop. Streetcars exiting the loop can turn northbound on Spadina, or southbound on Spadina to reach Queens Quay eastbound or westbound.

Although not used by buses as of 2025, this loop was the terminus for the former route 77 Spadina bus until 1997. The loop was demolished in 2013 and finished rebuilt in 2015 as part of the Queens Quay Revitalization Project.

==== Sunnyside Loop ====
Sunnyside is an anticlockwise loop northeast of the Queensway and Sunnyside Avenue, near the southwest corner of Roncesvalles Carhouse. It is located at 43°38′20.0″N 79°26′53.5″W. Streetcars enter westbound on the Queensway and exit southbound on Sunnyside Avenue, returning to the Queensway eastbound. Possible turn back point for the 501 Queen westbound.

==== Wolseley Loop ====
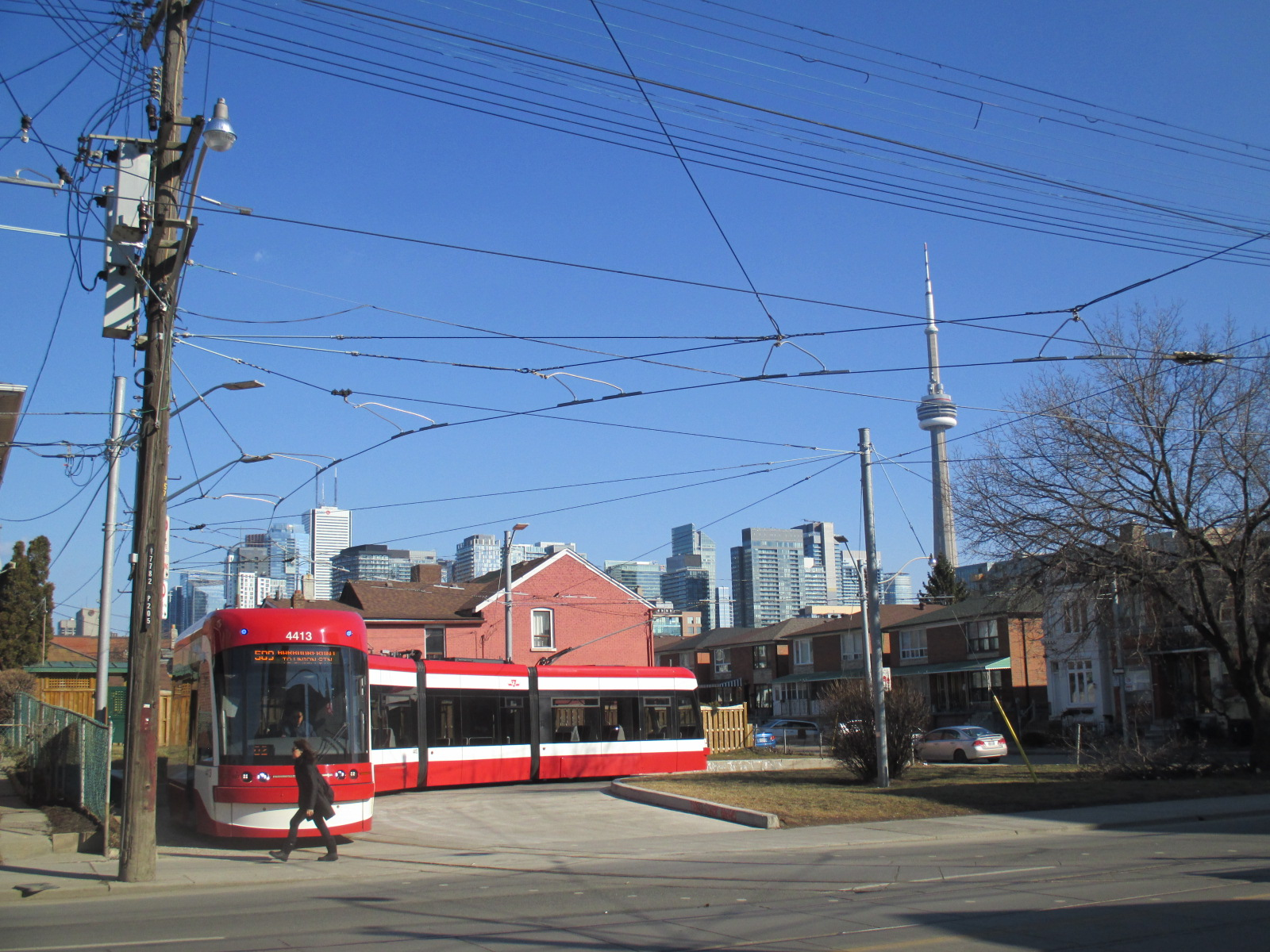
Wolseley Loop

Wolseley is an anticlockwise loop northeast of Bathurst Street and Wolseley Street, located at 43°38′53.8″N 79°24′14.6″W. It is a possible turnback point for westbound route 501 Queen streetcars, route 504 King in either direction, northbound 511 Bathurst streetcars. Streetcars eastbound or westbound on King Street or westbound on Queen Street can turn northbound on Bathurst, then can turn eastbound on Wolseley to enter the loop northbound, exiting onto Bathurst southbound to return to Queen Street eastbound or King Street eastbound or westbound. The loop is paved to handle buses; however, it has no passenger access. A cabin for drivers is provided.

==== Woodbine Loop ====
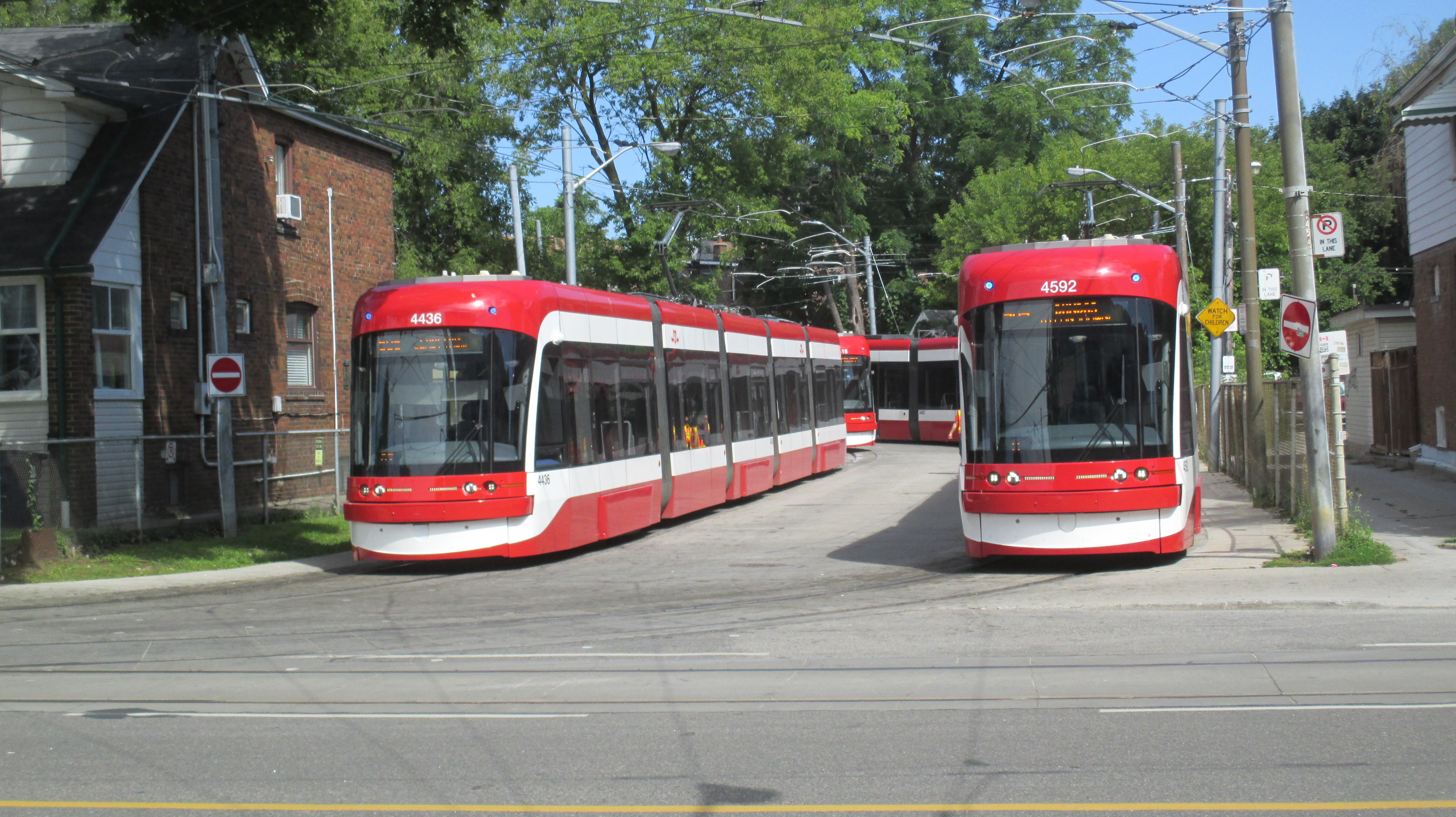
Woodbine Loop can hold up to four streetcars on its two tracks.

Woodbine is located northeast of the streetcar junction at Queen Street and Kingston Road, at 43°40′04.8″N 79°18′41.5″W. The loop is a possible turnback point for eastbound route 501 Queen and for 503 Kingston Road in either direction just north of Queen street. Streetcars enter the clockwise loop from Kingston Road East in either direction and exit eastbound only onto Queen Street. Within the loop there are two parallel tracks. The streetcar junction has an east-to-north curve that allow streetcars to turn back onto Kingston Road, or to do a loop-the-loop movement. There is no passenger access. The minimum radius of curvature for this loop is 11.2 m (37 ft).

The name Woodbine refers not to Woodbine Avenue, almost 500 metres to the east, but to the former Woodbine Race Course, which was once directly opposite the loop on the south side of Queen. The racetrack was renamed Greenwood Raceway after the New Woodbine Racetrack opened in another part of the city in 1957; Greenwood Raceway was demolished in 1994. Despite this, the "Woodbine Loop" name persists.

=== On-street loops ===
There are on-street loops where a streetcar runs entirely in the street around one or two city blocks to reverse.

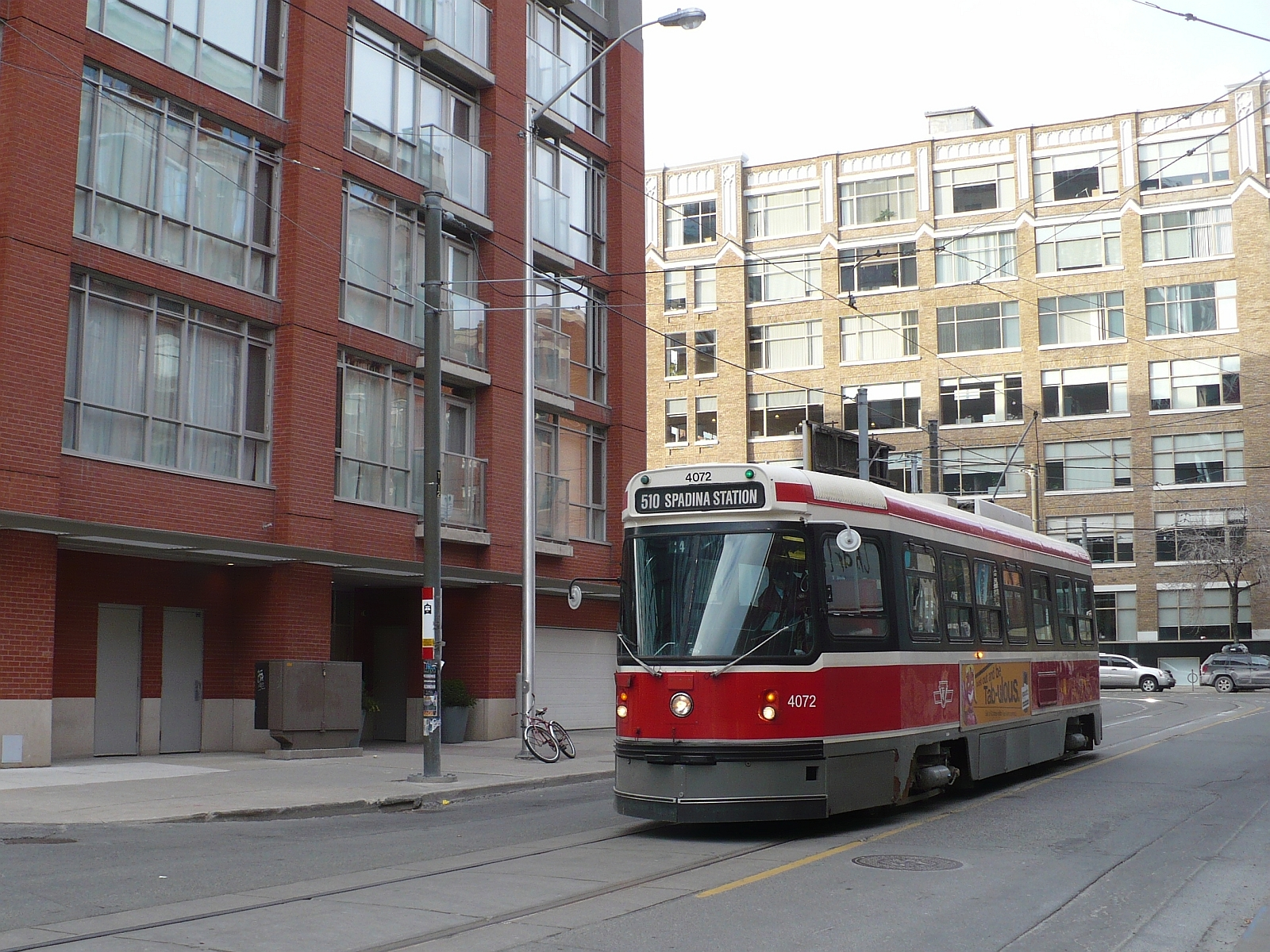
Waiting on Charlotte Street

==== Charlotte Loop ====
Charlotte is a clockwise on-street loop bounded by King Street, Spadina Avenue, Adelaide Street (eastbound), and Charlotte Street (southbound), located at 43°38′47″N 79°23′38″W. It is adjacent to the grand union at King Street and Spadina Avenue that complements Charlotte Loop in that one curve of the grand union is needed to reverse direction at the loop. Any streetcar on King Street or Spadina Avenue approaching the grand union can reverse direction via the loop. The loop was opened in 1999 to short-turn southbound 510 Spadina streetcars. Between 2017 and 2024, Charlotte Loop was used as the temporary western terminal for 503 Kingston Rd streetcars.

==== Church, Wellington and York Streets ====
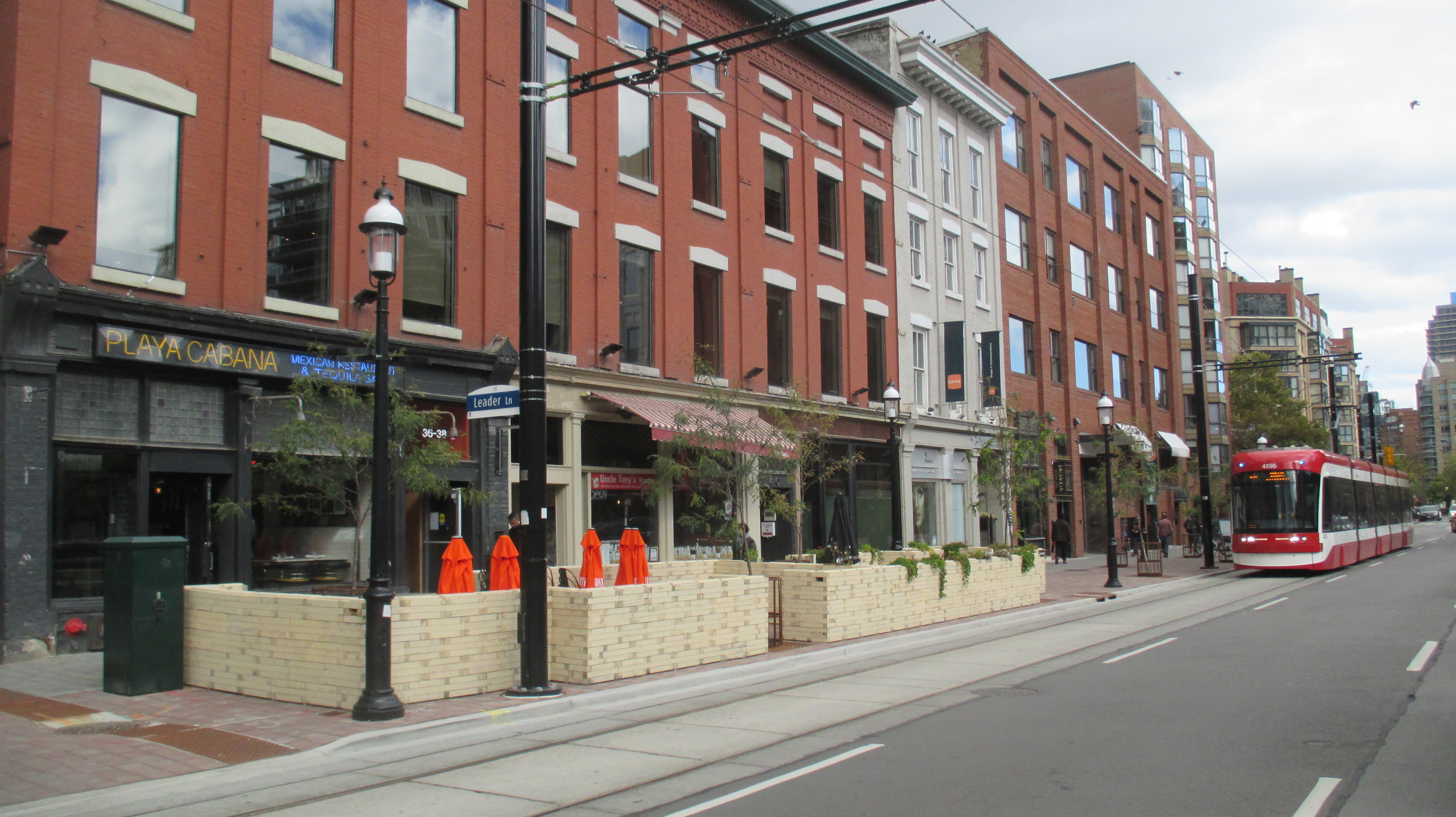
On Wellington Street, streetcars run westbound in the curb lane between Church and Yonge Streets.

A single streetcar track runs along Church, Wellington and York Streets south of King Street forming a turning loop. The loop has no name. Westbound streetcars on King Street and southbound streetcars from farther north on Church Street can enter the loop at the intersection of King and Church Streets. The exit from the loop is at the intersection of York and King Streets where streetcars can turn east or west on King Street or continue farther north on York Street. Streetcars need to turn east from York to Church Street to complete the loop. The loop has 5 streetcar stops: Church and Wellington Streets, Wellington and Yonge Streets, Wellington and Bay Streets, Wellington and York Streets and York and King Streets. These are in addition to the stops on King Street between York and Church Streets.

The loop was temporarily closed to streetcar service between early 2017 and late 2023 in order to accommodate utility work, track replacement and streetscape improvements. As part of the street modifications, the north-side sidewalk along Wellington Street between Church and Yonge Streets was widened with the result that the streetcar track now lies in the curb lane.

Until it was closed for construction along Wellington Street in 2017, the loop was used by the 503 Kingston Rd streetcar. When the loop reopened on October 8, 2023, a one-year diversion of the eastern segment of the 501 Queen streetcar used the loop as its western terminal. On October 6, 2024, the 503 Kingston Rd streetcar returned to the loop.

==== College Loop ====
College is an anticlockwise on-street loop via Lansdowne Avenue northbound, College Street going southwest (nominally westbound), and Dundas Street going southeast (nominally eastbound), located at 43°39′02″N 79°26′23.4″W. It is a possible turnback point for routes 505 Dundas and 506 Carlton in either direction. Streetcars can enter and exit the loop from or onto either Dundas or College in either direction.

==== Other on-street loops ====
In addition to the above on-street loops, there are other places in the system where a longer loop around city streets is possible because of the grid of streetcar lines in downtown Toronto supplemented by short sections of non-revenue trackage. Switches at junctions allow streetcars to go around multiple blocks in order to reverse direction.

An example of this is the eastern terminal of the 508 Lake Shore route which runs eastbound from King Street via Parliament Street northbound, Dundas Street Street eastbound, Broadview Avenue southbound, and Queen Street then King Street westbound.

=== Future loops ===
Four new streetcar loops have been proposed. As of 2023, none have been approved for construction.

==== Park Lawn Loop ====
In 2015, the TTC proposed the construction of Park Lawn Loop near Park Lawn Road and Lake Shore Boulevard. A 2017 TTC report said that Park Lawn Loop would allow more frequent service west to Park Lawn to serve existing and future developments in the area between Humber Loop and Park Lawn Road.

In 2019, the TTC was considering modifying 504B King to run from Broadview station to the new Park Lawn Loop instead of Dufferin Gate Loop. Route 503 Kingston Rd would then be extended west to serve Dufferin Gate Loop.

==== Polson Loop ====
In 2021, the City of Toronto was planning the Waterfront East LRT, a new streetcar line to run on its own right-of-way from Union Station to Toronto's Port Lands. At that time, city planners considered three alternative locations for a terminus loop: at Parliament Street and Queens Quay East (a temporary loop), at Distillery Loop or at Polson Street. The Polson Loop would be on Ookwemin Minising (formerly Villiers Island) along the east side of Cherry Street south of Polson Street. In 2021, a new bridge was installed on a relocated Cherry Street to cross the Keating Channel onto Ookwemin Minising; it would be capable of carrying streetcars to a future Polson Loop.

However, in 2023, city planners decided to build Villiers Loop and defer Polson Loop to a later project, as a Villiers Loop would better serve planned new development on Ookwemin Minising.

==== Riverside Loop ====
In 2019, the TTC proposed the construction of Riverside Loop on the east side of Broadview Avenue just north of Queen Street East, on lands owned by the TTC but used as a municipal Green-P parking lot. At that time, the TTC was considering splitting 501 Queen into two overlapping routes, with 501A operating between Neville Loop and Sunnyside Loop, and 501B operating between Sunnyside Loop and the new Riverside Loop.

==== Villiers Loop ====
In 2023, as part of the Waterfront East LRT project, city planners decided to construct a loop on Ookwemin Minising that would run east from Cherry Street along Commissioners Street, then north on New Munitions Street, east on Centre Street, south on Villiers Street (the latter three streets as yet unbuilt as of 2024), returning westbound via Commissioners Street. The loop would be in a dedicated right-of-way. An off-street loop was rejected as that would reduce the amount of land available for new residential development. The minimum track radius would be 15 metres (49 ft). Planners prioritized Villiers Loop over Polson Loop, with Polson being deferred to a future project as Villiers Loop would better serve planned new development and new parks on Ookwemin Minising.

== Former loops ==
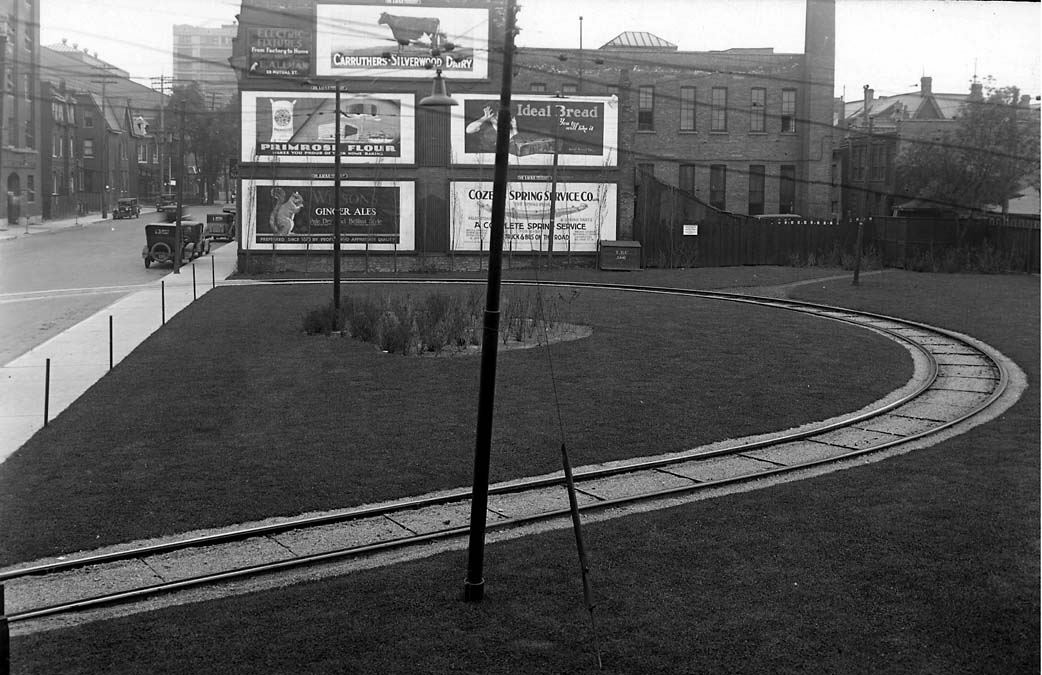
Mutual Loop in 1929

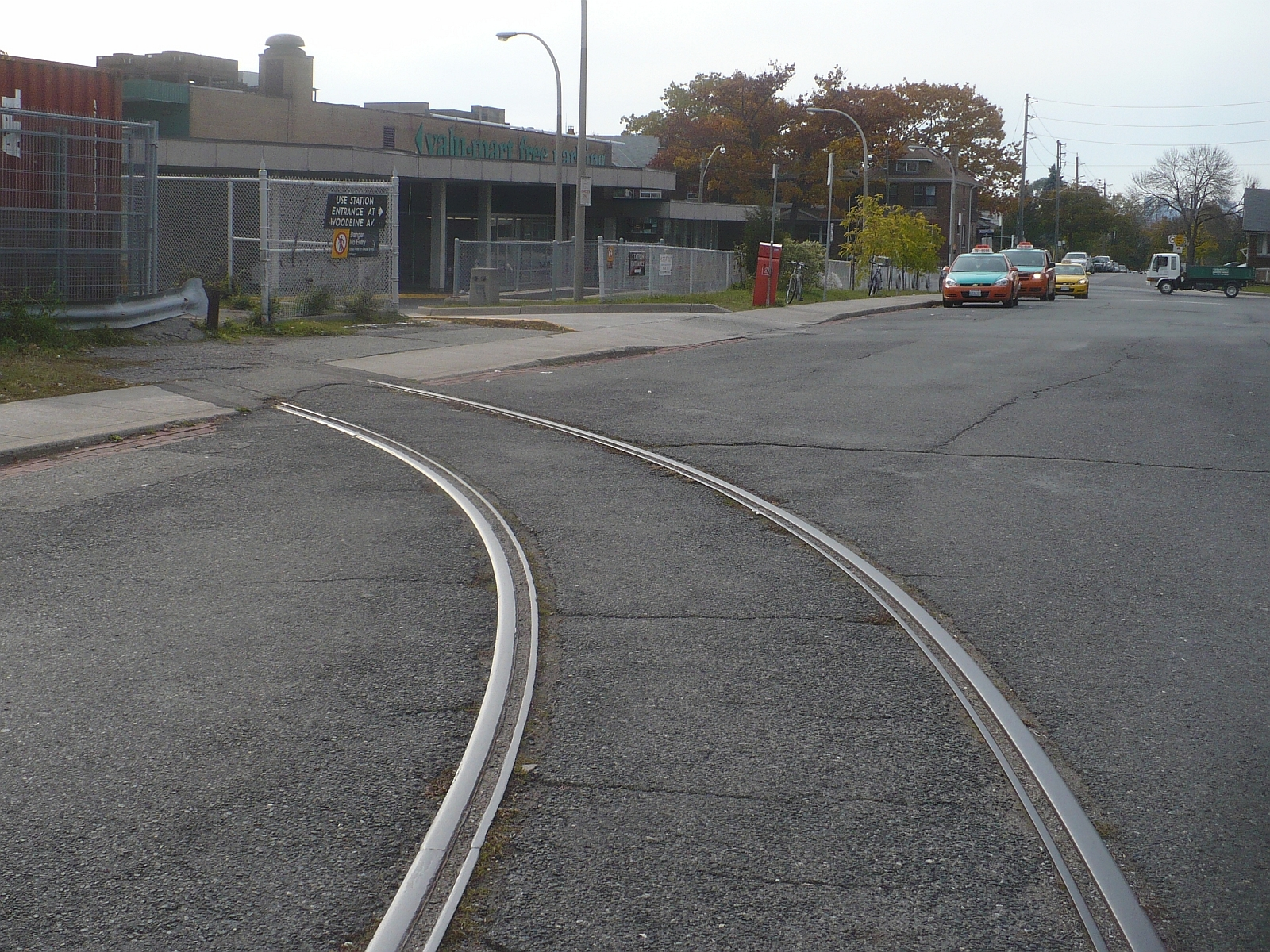
Disused streetcar track on Strathmore Boulevard

Name	Location	Streetcar route last using loop	Status and notes
Asquith Loop	Church Street north of Bloor Street East	Church	Later bus loop, now redeveloped as office complex
Avon Loop	Weston Road & Rogers Road	Weston Road	Later trolley bus loop, then buses. Was under renewal as a new streetcar/bus loop in 2014.
Bedford Loop	Bloor Street West & Bedford Road	Bloor	Partially redeveloped, partially parking lot
Bicknell Loop	Rogers Road & Bicknell Avenue	Rogers Road	Redeveloped
Birchmount Loop	Birchmount Road & Kingston Road	Kingston Rd.	Sold, redeveloped into condominiums
Caledonia Loop	St. Clair Avenue West & Station Street	St. Clair	Commercial development
Christie Loop	Dupont Street & Christie Street	Dupont	Redeveloped
City Hall Loop	on-street: Louisa, James, Albert & Bay Streets	Dundas	Louisa Street closed and redeveloped; tracks removed from other streets
Danforth (or Danforth–Coxwell) Loop	Danforth Avenue & Coxwell Avenue	Coxwell	Was part of Danforth Carhouse property; later redeveloped
Erindale Loop	Broadview Avenue & Erindale Avenue north side of street, opposite parkette	King	Redeveloped
Exhibition Loop (old)	North of Princes Boulevard, 400 metres (1,300 ft) west of Strachan	Bathurst	Redeveloped into National Trade Centre (now Enercare Centre)
Ferry (or Ferry Docks) Loop	Queens Quay West west of Bay Street	Dupont	Parking lot
Gilbert Loop	Eglinton Avenue West & Gilbert Street	Oakwood	Parkette. Was the terminus for trolley buses on route 63 from 1947 to 1978, when route 63 was extended east to Eglinton West station.
Glen Echo Loop	Yonge Street & Glen Echo Avenue	Yonge	Terminal shed and loop removed and now parking lot for Loblaws store. Car barn (storage for about 12 single truck (small) streetcars) was converted into a car dealership from 1950s to 1980s then demolished for a Loblaws store. Roadway to loop now part of Doncliffe Drive. Was used by trolley buses on route 61 from 1954 to 1991.
Hillingdon Loop	Danforth Avenue & Hillingdon Avenue	Bloor	Was part of Danforth Carhouse property
Jane Loop	Bloor Street West & Jane Street	Bloor	Now redeveloped as a medical office building
Keele Loop	Keele Street north of St. Clair Avenue West	512 St. Clair	Redeveloped
Keele station loop	Indian Grove & Bloor Street West	Bloor	Temporary loop 1966–68; redeveloped
Lawton Loop	north of Yonge Street and Lawton Boulevard intersection	Yonge	Lawton Parkette
Lipton Loop	Lipton Avenue & Pape Avenue	Harbord	Now the site of Pape station and bus loop
Luttrell Loop	Danforth Avenue, between Luttrell & Kelvin Avenues (west of Victoria Park Avenue)	Bloor	Sold, redeveloped into housing
Main Loop	Main Street north of Danforth Avenue	Carlton	Rebuilt into Main Street station loop
Mt. Pleasant Loop	Eglinton Avenue East & Mount Pleasant Road	Mt. Pleasant	Also known as Eglinton Loop. Later trolley bus loop, then buses. Originally open-air, now under an apartment building.
Mutual Loop	Mutual Street & Queen Street East	Lakeshore	Redeveloped, now a parking lot
Moore Park Loop	Mount Pleasant Road & St. Clair Avenue East	St. Clair	Loring-Wyle Parkette
Northlands Loop	Weston Road & Northlands (or Northland) Avenue	Weston Road	Redeveloped as commercial plaza
Park Loop	Bloor Street West & High Park Avenue	Bloor	Part of High Park
Parliament Loop	King Street East	Parliament	Later bus loop only; now under part of a car dealership.
Pine Loop/Wye	Lakeshore Road West and Pine Avenue South, Mississauga	Port Credit	Now Peel dealership lot.
Prescott Loop	Prescott Avenue and St. Clair Avenue West	Dovercourt	Now St. Clair Garden Parkette
Royce Loop	Lansdowne Avenue & Dupont Street	Harbord	Redeveloped
Runnymede Loop	Dundas Street West & Runnymede Road	Dundas	Later trolley bus loop, then buses
St. Clair (or Wychwood) Carhouse Loop	Wychwood Avenue & Benson Avenue	St. Clair	Reduced to wye after carhouse closed, then closed
St. Clarens Loop	St. Clarens Avenue & Davenport Road	Harbord	Primrose Avenue Parkette
Simcoe Loop	Front Street West & Simcoe Street	Yonge	Redeveloped
Small Arms Loop	Long Branch Small Arms factory, on Lakeshore Road almost 0.5 mile west of Long Branch Loop	Long Branch	For temporary 1942–1945 extension of route into Toronto Township (today's Mississauga) Shelter removed after 1958 and now loop area is Lakeshore Park east of Deta Road and Lakeshore Road.
Terauley	on-street: Bay, Richmond, Victoria, Queen	Bay	Bus loop
Townsley	north of St. Clair Avenue West & Old Weston Road	512 St. Clair	Bus loop
Vaughan Loop	north of Bathurst Street/Vaughan Road intersection	Bathurst	Redeveloped
Viaduct Loop	Bloor Street East & Parliament Street	Parliament	Parkette
Vincent Loop	Across from Dundas West station	King	Redeveloped as Crossways Mall and condos
Woodbine station loop	Cedarvale Avenue & Strathmore Boulevard	Danforth	Temporary loop 1966–1968; later part of parking lot. Some loop track still visible on Strathmore Boulevard

== Former wyes ==
As an alternative to a loop, a streetcar can also be turned using a manoeuvre similar to a three-point turn, involving at least two switches and a suitable layout of connecting tracks. This can be done if necessary at any intersection or other track junction where suitable tracks exist, but the TTC also had a few wye tracks with no other purpose. No wyes remain in the system; the table shows some of the last ones to be removed.

Former Toronto streetcar wyes
Name	Location	Date closed	Notes
Adelaide wye	Bathurst Street & Adelaide Street West	1973	Remnant of through tracks on Adelaide Street
Glencairn wye	Yonge Street & Glencairn Avenue	1954	Closed with the opening of Yonge subway and the closure of Yonge streetcar
Hillside wye	Lake Shore Boulevard West and Hillside Avenue	2002	Track removed
Junction wye	Keele Street & Junction Road	1963	Removed as part of closure of Bloor streetcar route
Pine wye	Pine Avenue South and Lakeshore Road West	1950	Converted as loop
St. Clair Carhouse wye	Wychwood Avenue & Benson Avenue	1998	Access tracks for former carhouse retained when it closed in 1978

== See also ==
- Balloon loop
- Wye (rail)
