= 506 Carlton =

Streetcar route in Toronto, Canada

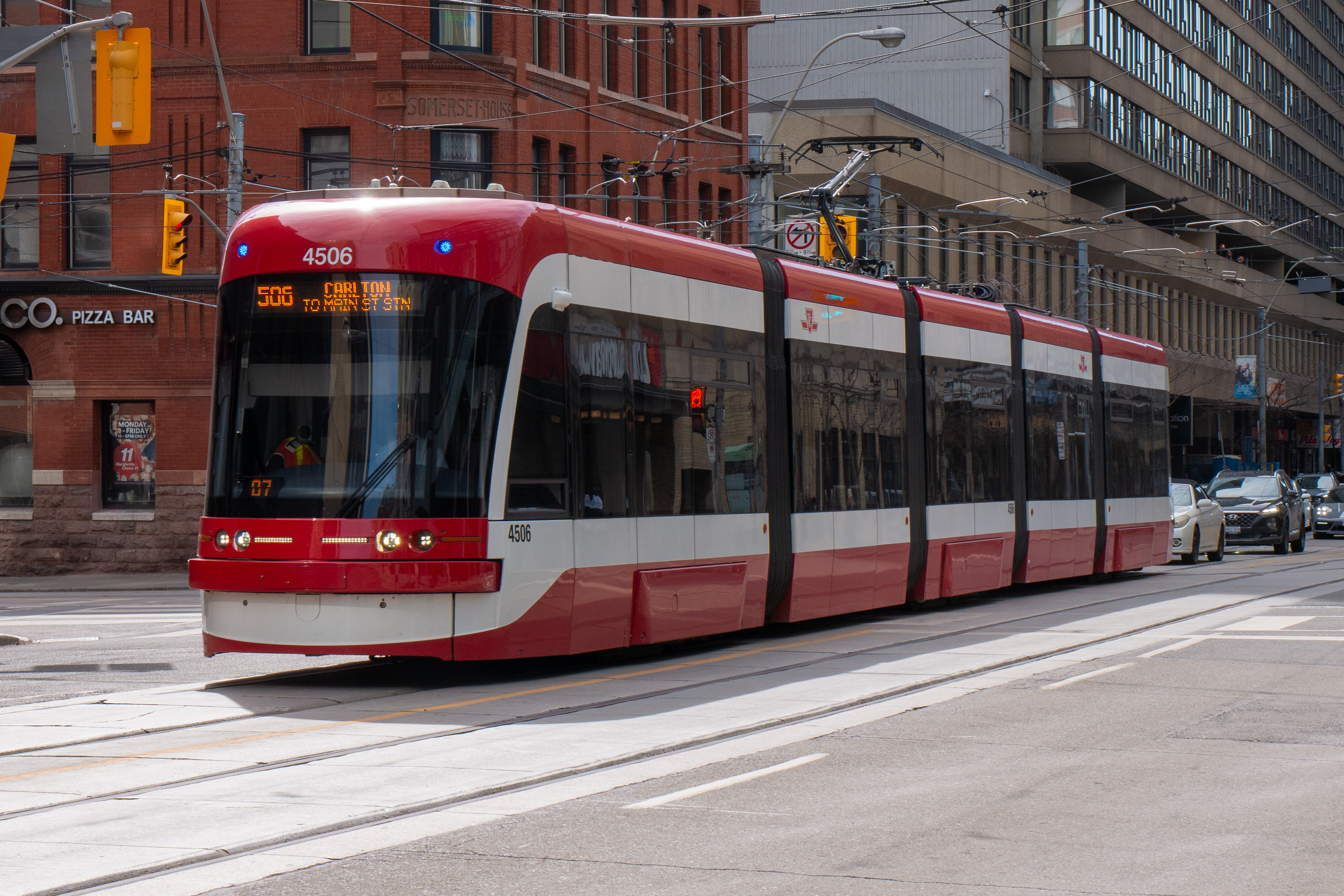
- A Flexity Outlook on route 506 Carlton

Overview
- Locale: Toronto, Ontario, Canada
- Termini: High Park Loop (west); Main Street (east)
- Stations: Queen's Park; College; Main Street
- Website: Official route page

Service
- Type: Streetcar route
- System: Toronto streetcar system
- Route number: 506 (306 overnight)
- Operator: Toronto Transit Commission
- Depot: Roncesvalles
- Rolling stock: Flexity Outlook
- Daily ridership: 23,700 (2025, weekdays)

History
- Opened: 1886; 140 years ago

Technical
- Line length: 15.1 km (9.38 mi)
- Track gauge: 4 ft 10 7/8 in (1,495 mm)
- Electrification: 600 V DC overhead

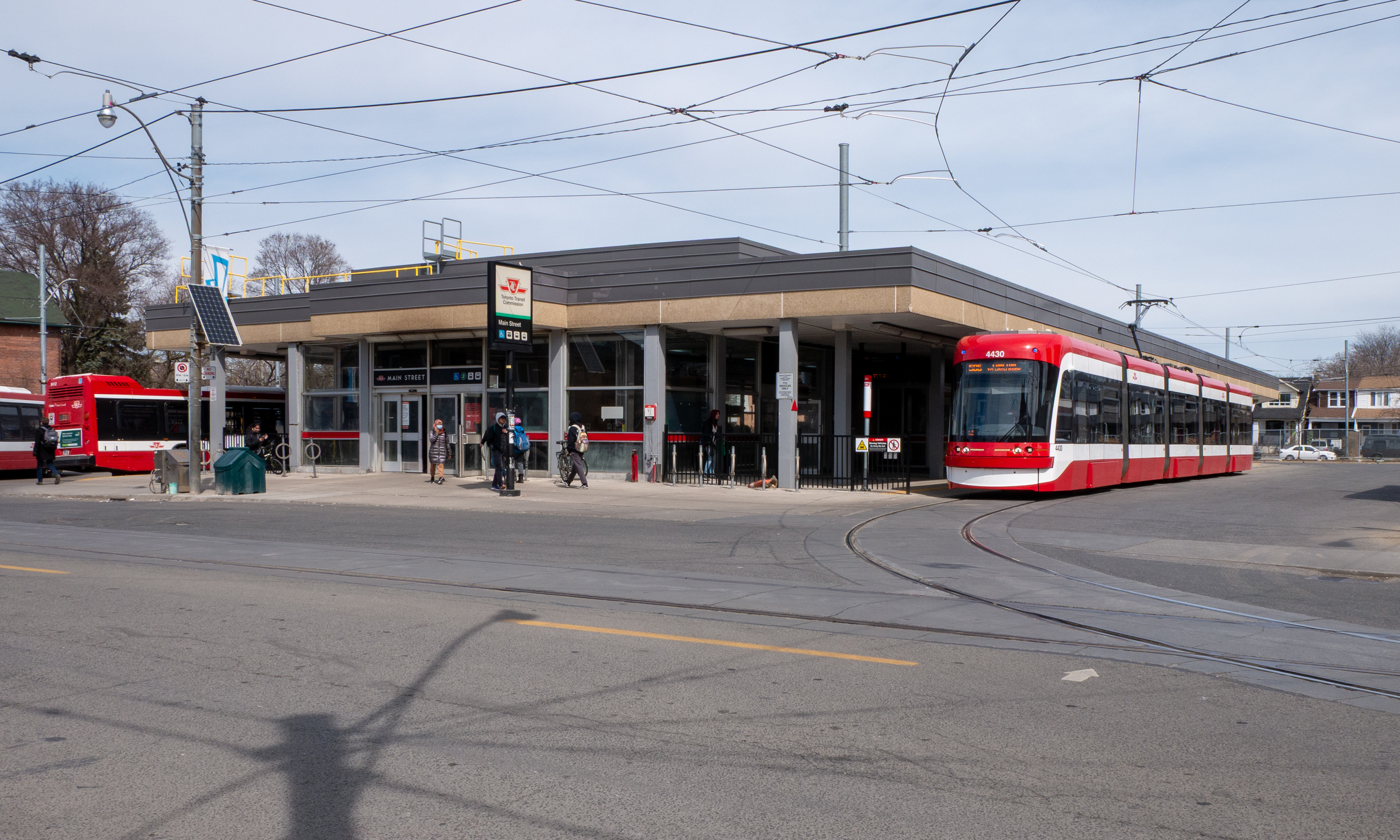
Main Street subway station is the eastern terminus of the route.

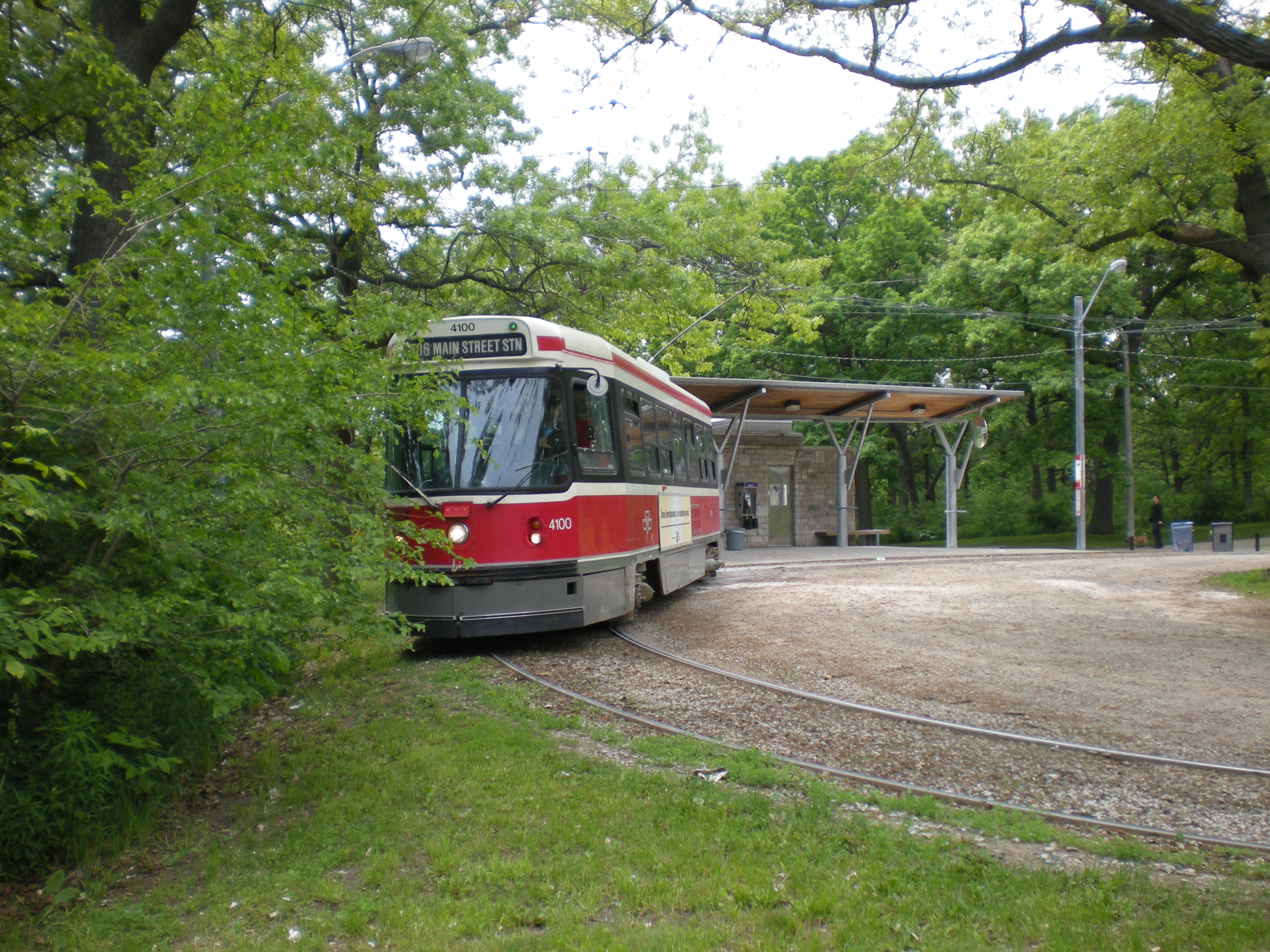
CLRV departing High Park Loop

506 Carlton (306 Carlton during overnight periods) is a Toronto streetcar route run by the Toronto Transit Commission in Ontario, Canada. It runs from Main Street station on subway Line 2 Bloor–Danforth along Gerrard, Carlton and College Streets to High Park. Despite the route's name, less than 10 percent of its length actually uses Carlton Street.

== Route ==
The Carlton line runs from the eastern terminus of Main Street station (on Line 2 Bloor–Danforth), initially heading south on Main Street to Gerrard Street East. It then turns west onto the upper portion of Gerrard Street East to Coxwell Avenue, where it turns south to the lower portion Gerrard Street. (Coxwell Avenue is part of a jog that separates the upper and lower portions of Gerrard Street.) The line continues west on Gerrard Street East to Parliament Street, where it turns north to Carlton Street. The streetcar goes west on Carlton Street, which at Yonge Street continues onto College Street. There, it passes College station on subway Line 1 Yonge–University. Continuing west, it passes Queen's Park station again on Line 1 Yonge–University. The route continues to the end of College Street at Dundas Street West. It then runs west on Dundas Street West to Howard Park Avenue, which it follows into its western terminus at High Park Loop within High Park.

Some eastbound Carlton streetcars may short turn at Coxwell Avenue and head southbound to Coxwell Loop near the intersection of Queen Street East and Coxwell Avenue.

Streetcar service is provided 24 hours per day on most portions of the route. The late night trips operate as the 306 Carlton, which runs along the same route as 506 Carlton.

== History ==
There were several versions of the Carlton route starting from August 1886 when the Toronto Street Railway created a horsecar line of that name. All versions traveled along Carlton Street but had a variety of terminals, and none of the earlier versions of the route had the east–west breadth of today's route.

By July 1, 1923, the Carlton route had evolved to resemble today's 506 Carlton route. There were three differences between the 1923 route and today's route. In 1923, College Street terminated at Lansdowne Avenue; thus, the tracks for the Carlton route needed to turn south for one short block on Lansdowne Avenue to join the tracks on Dundas Street West. At Yonge Street, Carlton and College streets were not continuous as they are today; thus, Carlton streetcars had to do a right/left jog for one block using Yonge Street. At the east end of the line, there was no loop at Main Street north of Danforth Avenue in 1923; thus, Carlton streetcars had to turn east on Danforth Avenue to terminate at the Luttrell Loop at the corner of Luttrell Avenue and Danforth Avenue.

On June 3, 1931, the jog at Yonge Street was eliminated by realigning Carlton Street to flow into College Street. On May 9, 1940, the jog at Lansdowne Avenue was eliminated by extending College Street to directly join Dundas Street West. On May 15, 1955, a loop was constructed at the site of today's Main station, thus providing relief from streetcar congestion at the Luttrell Loop, also used by the now-defunct Bloor streetcar line. Thus, by the third change, the Carlton route matched today's 506 Carlton route.

On January 8, 1939, PCC streetcars were introduced on the Carlton route on Sundays, displacing Peter Witt streetcars.

Between April 25 and June 13, 1966, the loop at Main Station was constructed on the site of the 1955 loop. Carlton streetcars started using the new loop before the subway platforms were open to the public on May 10, 1968. During construction, Carlton streetcars had to be diverted to the Luttrell Loop.

Around early 1978, the TTC announced plans to number all of its streetcar routes (which had been known only by names), and the Carlton route was to be number 506. The route number 506 began being displayed on the streetcars' destination signs on February 4, 1980, when the Carlton route was still operated entirely by PCC streetcars.

From February 18 to September 2, 2018, streetcars along the 506 Carlton route were replaced by buses due to a streetcar shortage and to accommodate several construction projects.

By November 24, 2019, CLRVs were no longer being scheduled for 506 Carlton, having been replaced by Flexity Outlook streetcars, thus making the route fully accessible.

From late June 2020 until the end of 2020, regular streetcar service along the entire 506 Carlton line was temporarily replaced by buses to accommodate several construction projects, including the modification of the streetcar overhead between Bay Street and High Park for pantograph use.

Prior to July 27, 2024, the 306 Carlton night route terminated at Dundas West station, while 506 Carlton terminated at High Park. On that date, the 306 route was modified to terminate at High Park; thus, both 506 and 306 covered the same route. This change coincided with the introduction of the 305 Dundas night route that, like 505 Dundas, terminates at Dundas West station.

== Sites along the line (from east to west) ==
- Main Square (at intersection of Main and Danforth)
- Ted Reeve Arena (at intersection of Main and Gerrard streets)
- Little India (between Greenwood and Coxwell avenues)
- East Chinatown (between Carlaw and Broadview avenues)
- Cabbagetown (between Don River and Parliament Street)
- Regent Park (between River and Shuter streets)
- Allan Gardens (between Sherbourne and Jarvis streets)
- Maple Leaf Gardens (at Church Street)
- College Park (at Yonge Street)
- Toronto Police headquarters (at Bay Street)
- Queen's Park (at University Avenue)
- Toronto General Hospital (at University Avenue)
- University of Toronto St. George (between University and Spadina avenues)
- Kensington Market (at Spadina Avenue)
- Little Italy (between Bathurst Street and Ossington Avenue)
- Roncesvalles (at Roncesvalles Avenue)
- High Park
