= Talisker (disambiguation) =

Talisker is a settlement in Skye, Scotland

Talisker may also refer to:

- Talisker (band), by the Scottish percussionist Ken Hyder
- Talisker, Western Australia, in the Shire of Shark Bay#Towns and localities, Australia
- Talisker distillery, a whisky distillery near Talisker, in Carbost, Skye, Scotland
- Talisker Conservation Park, Australia
- Talisker Corporation, the owner of Main Square in Toronto

== See also ==
- Talisker Masters, the Australian Masters annual golf tournament
