= Main Square (Toronto) =

Coordinates: 43.687682°N 79.300459°W

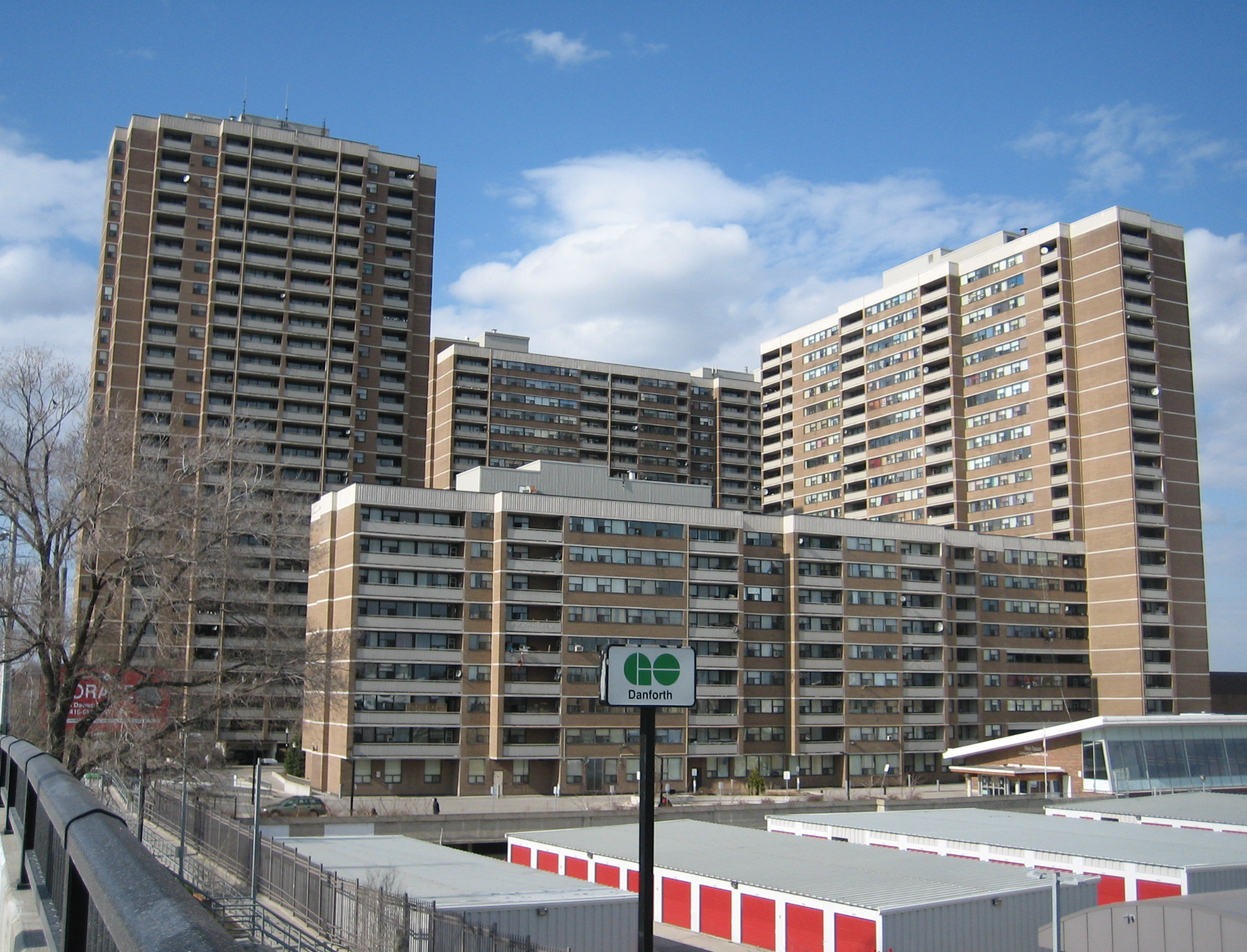
The Main Square complex

Main Square is a complex of four apartment buildings in Toronto, Canada. The three-hectare site houses about 2000 people. It is located in the eastern part of the city at the intersection of Main Street and Danforth Avenue.

The complex is located just north of the railway lines and the Danforth GO Station and just south of the Main Street subway station. It consists of four towers, the tallest being 29 stories. At ground level, there is also a shopping plaza along Danforth and a city-run community centre.

== History ==
The complex was built in 1972 in a joint venture with the Canada Mortgage and Housing Corporation (CMHC), a government entity, and a private developer. It was built on land by the railroad that had previously belonged to the Canadian National Railway.

By the mid-1980s, like many buildings built in that style and period, the complex already had a down and out appearance, with an empty concrete frontage and public space. All the shops in the plaza did not have doors opening directly on to Danforth, but were only accessible through doors leading into the complex.

CMHC sold its share of the building in 1998, and it is now a fully private enterprise. Since 1998, there has been significant investment in improvements to the existing buildings. These improvements have occurred in stages and have included updates to the building facades, lobbies, halls and infrastructure (boilers, windows, elevators and roofs); improvements to the centre court and garage (reconstruction of the eastern section of the garage, repainting and additional landscaping).

By the latter part of the 2000s, there was revitalization of the shops and services along Danforth Avenue, and conversion of vacant office and locker space into units providing better supervision of the open space around the building.

In 2006, the city of Toronto rezoned the area, permitting the owner, Talisker Corporation, to build two more towers in the complex, thus adding 500 new rental housing units to the existing Main Square development, which will provide for appropriate residential intensification that is transit-accessible. As part of the proposal, both the existing and new rental buildings were to be secured as rental housing, along with the improvements to the existing buildings, the provision of new and refurbished amenity spaces and improved landscaped areas. The proposed development would also secure significant community benefits through a negotiated agreement under Section 37 of the Planning Act of the City of Toronto.
