= Main Street station (Toronto) =

Toronto subway station

Main Street
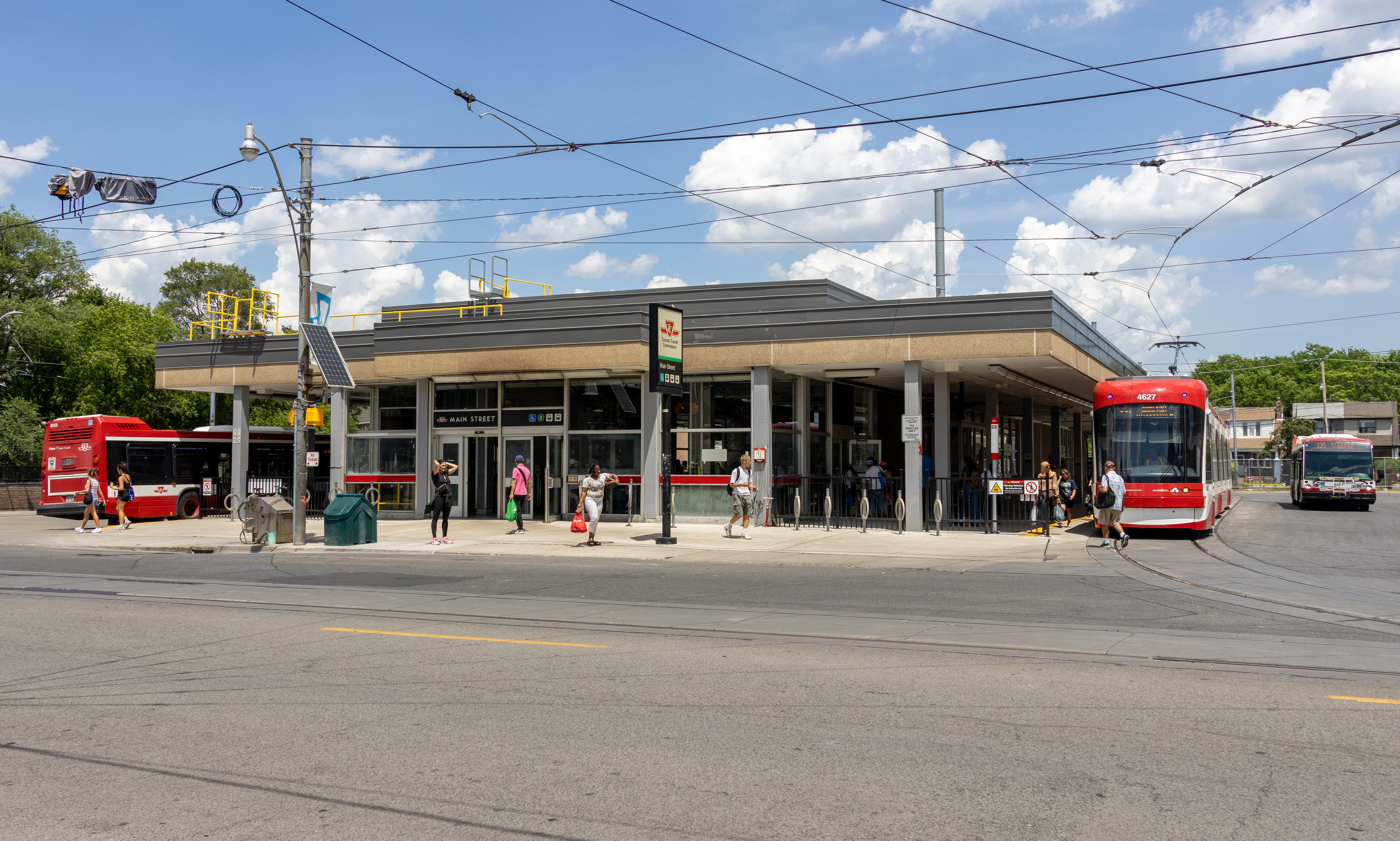
- Station exterior

General information
- Location: 315 Main Street; Toronto, Ontario; Canada
- Coordinates: 43°41′21″N 79°18′06″W
- Platforms: Side platforms
- Tracks: 2
- Connections: TTC buses: 20 Cliffside; 23 Dawes; 62 Mortimer; 64 Main; 87 Cosburn; 113 Danforth; 135 Gerrard; 300 Bloor–Danforth; 506 306 Carlton at Danforth GO

Construction
- Structure type: Underground
- Accessible: Yes

Other information
- Website: Official station page

History
- Opened: May 10, 1968; 58 years ago

Passengers
- 2023–2024: 18,682
- Rank: 39 of 70

Services
Preceding station	Toronto Transit Commission	Following station
Woodbine towards Kipling	Line 2 Bloor–Danforth	Victoria Park towards Kennedy
Danforth Avenue towards High Park Loop	506 Carlton	Terminus
Location

Main Street is a station on Line 2 Bloor–Danforth in Toronto, Ontario, Canada and is located on the east side of Main Street a short distance north of Danforth Avenue. Connections to GO Transit's commuter train service on the Lakeshore East line can be made at Danforth GO Station, approximately 300 metres to the south on the east side of Main Street.

== Description ==
Platform

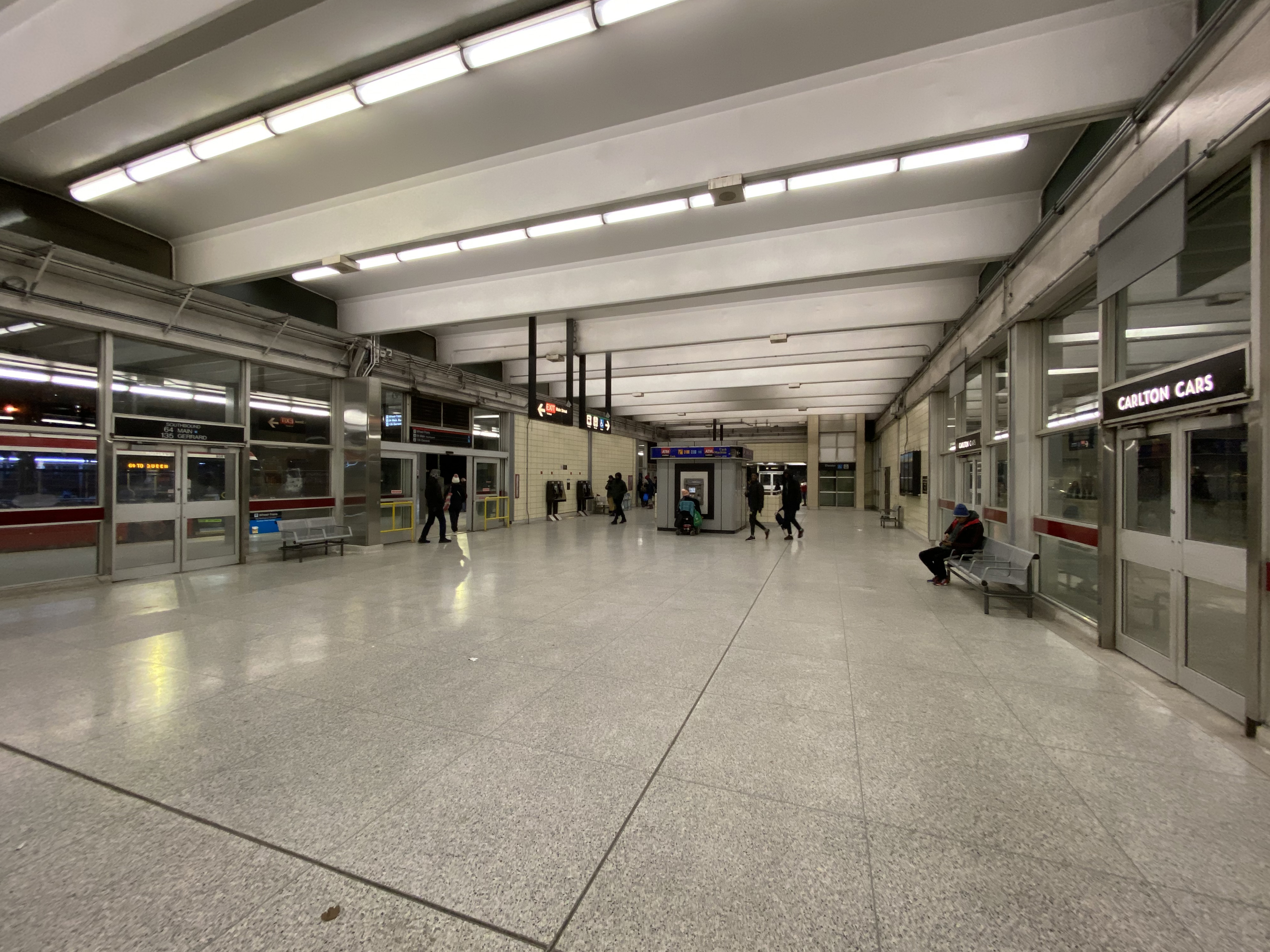
Street level

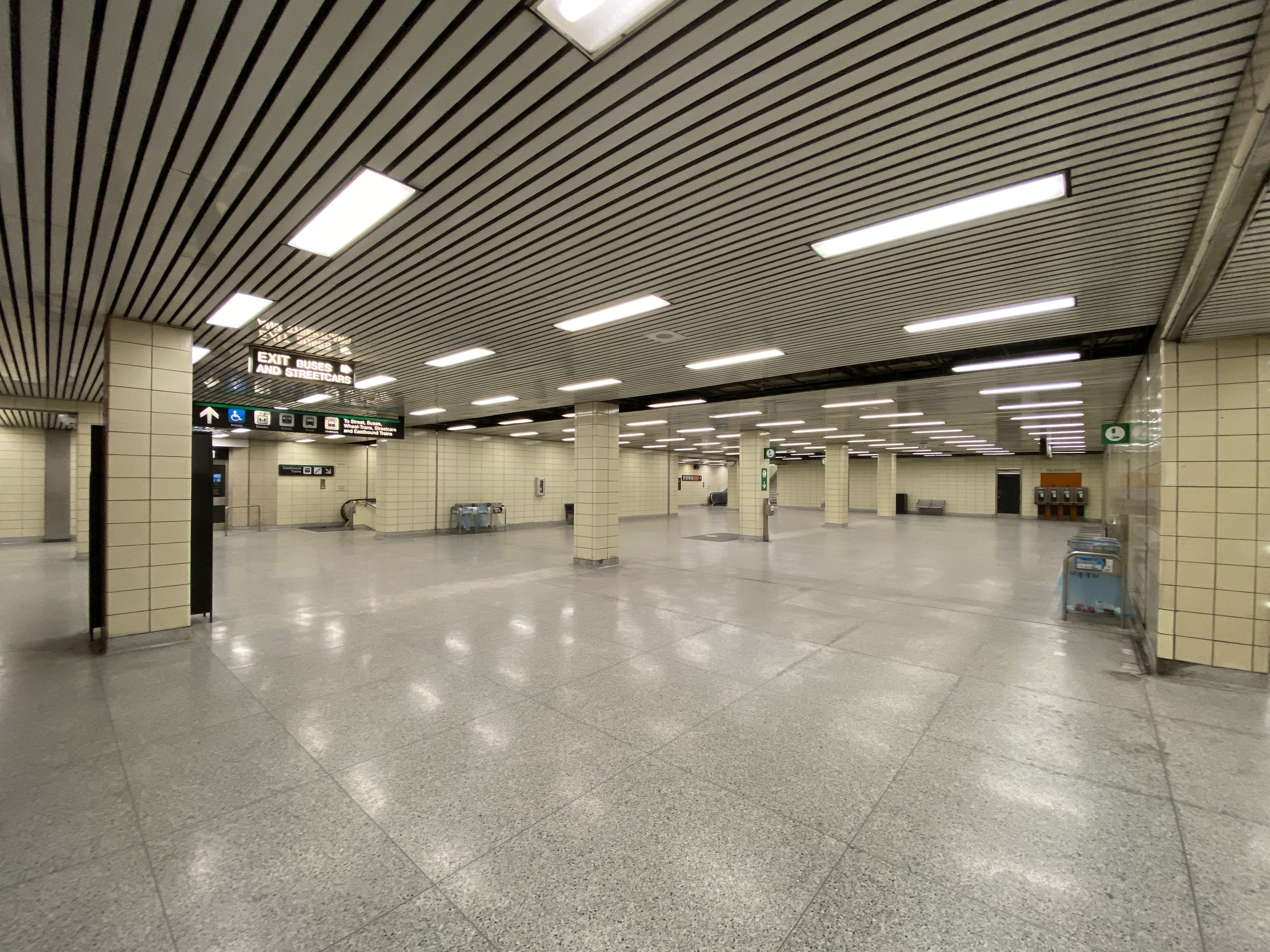
Concourse level

The TTC station is roughly rectangular in shape and has three levels: street level, concourse level and platform level. The bus bays, streetcar platform and fare gates are located at street level. There are five bus bays on the north and east sides of the station building. The south side of the building is occupied by a single, long streetcar platform on the inside of a clockwise streetcar loop encircling the building that serves as the eastern terminus of the 506 Carlton streetcar (306 Carlton at night).The bus bays and streetcar platform are behind the fare gates inside the fare-paid area. A set of two opposing stairwells lead down to the concourse level, where a single up-only escalator leads back to street level. The concourse level is home to a Gateway Newsstand. From the concourse, two more sets of opposing stairwells on the north and south sides of the concourse level lead down to the platforms, with up-only escalators connecting both platforms to the concourse.

This station became wheelchair accessible in 2004. One elevator near the southeast corner of the station building provides access from street level to the concourse level of the eastbound subway platform; a second elevator in the northwest corner provides a connection between the concourse level and the westbound subway platform. To facilitate accessibility, automatic sliding doors were added at the street entrance and on the north side of the station building to access the bus bays, along with an accessible fare gate and improved signage. A space is reserved for Wheel-Trans vehicles.

== History ==
Main Street station opened on May 10, 1968, as part of the first round of extensions to Line 2, which had opened two years earlier between Keele and Woodbine. Line 2 opened between Warden and Islington in 1968, with one-stop extensions to Kennedy and Kipling opening in 1980. Main Street station was built on the site of the former Main streetcar loop that opened on May 15, 1955, as the eastern terminus of the Carlton streetcar line (today route 506 Carlton). Main Loop was built to relieve congestion at Luttrell Loop, which had been the previous terminus of the Carlton streetcar since 1923. Between April 25 and June 13, 1966, the 1955 loop was closed to build a new streetcar loop for Main Street subway station. During construction, Carlton streetcars temporarily returned to Luttrell Loop. Carlton streetcars started using the new station loop in 1966, before the subway platforms at the station were open to the public in 1968.

Unlike most TTC stations, its name includes the word "Street" in order to avoid the possible misreading that it is the subway's "main" station. It is named after Main Street, which was the main street of the suburban town of East Toronto, which was amalgamated into Toronto in 1908.

The station was initially built with its turnstiles and collector booths on the concourse level between the bus and streetcar terminal and the subway platforms, because until 1973, some of the buses serving the station crossed the fare zone boundary between Toronto and the then-city of Scarborough. When the fare zone system was abolished in 1973, the fare gates were moved upstairs to street level, to bring the bus bays and streetcar platform into the fare-paid area. Because of this, Main Street station has a larger concourse compared to many other subway stations on Line 2, particularly those directly to the east which were built as part of the original section of Line 2 opened in 1966.

Main–Danforth has been identified by Metrolinx as a transportation mobility hub as it is located at the interchange of two or more current or planned regional rapid transit lines. As a result, Main Street was the first subway station to be outfitted with new accessible paddle-style Presto fare gates, which replaced the existing tripod turnstiles system-wide and are used with Presto cards across the subway system.

Danforth GO Station is a station on the Lakeshore East Line, located approximately 300 metres (980 ft) south of the station along Main Street. The station has also sporadically served trains on the Stouffville Line. The two stations are within walking distance of each other and an accessible ramp exists at Danforth GO, but the path follows Main Street on the sidewalk for most of its distance and is exposed to the elements.

The TTC closed the bus and streetcar loop at Main Street station between May 7, 2023, and September 2023 for infrastructure upgrades. The work included concrete and asphalt pavement rehabilitation within the bus loop, concrete bus platform rehabilitation including the installation of tactile walking surface indicator, and fencing replacement throughout the loop. Construction activities were set to continue until the end of November 2023.

== Subway infrastructure in the vicinity ==
East of the station the tracks angle north away from Danforth Avenue and emerge to run on the surface at the Tyra Portal in Dentonia Park, just west of Victoria Park station. To the west the subway tunnel was mostly constructed by cut-and-cover along Harris Avenue from Woodbine station.

== Surface connections ==
TTC routes serving the station include:

Bay Number	Route	Name	Additional information
1	23	Dawes	Northbound to St. Clair Avenue East
2	20	Cliffside	Westbound to Kennedy station
2	113	Danforth	Westbound to Kennedy station
3	87A	Cosburn	Westbound to Broadview station via East York Acres
3	87C	Cosburn	Westbound to Broadview station
4	62	Mortimer	Westbound to Hennick Bridgepoint Hospital via Broadview station
4	135	Gerrard	Eastbound to Warden station
5	64	Main	Southbound to Queen Street East; Northound to Cosburn Avenue
6	Streetcar unloading Only		
7	306	Carlton	Blue Night Streetcar service to High Park Loop
7	506	Carlton	Streetcar; westbound to High Park Loop
