= High Park Loop =

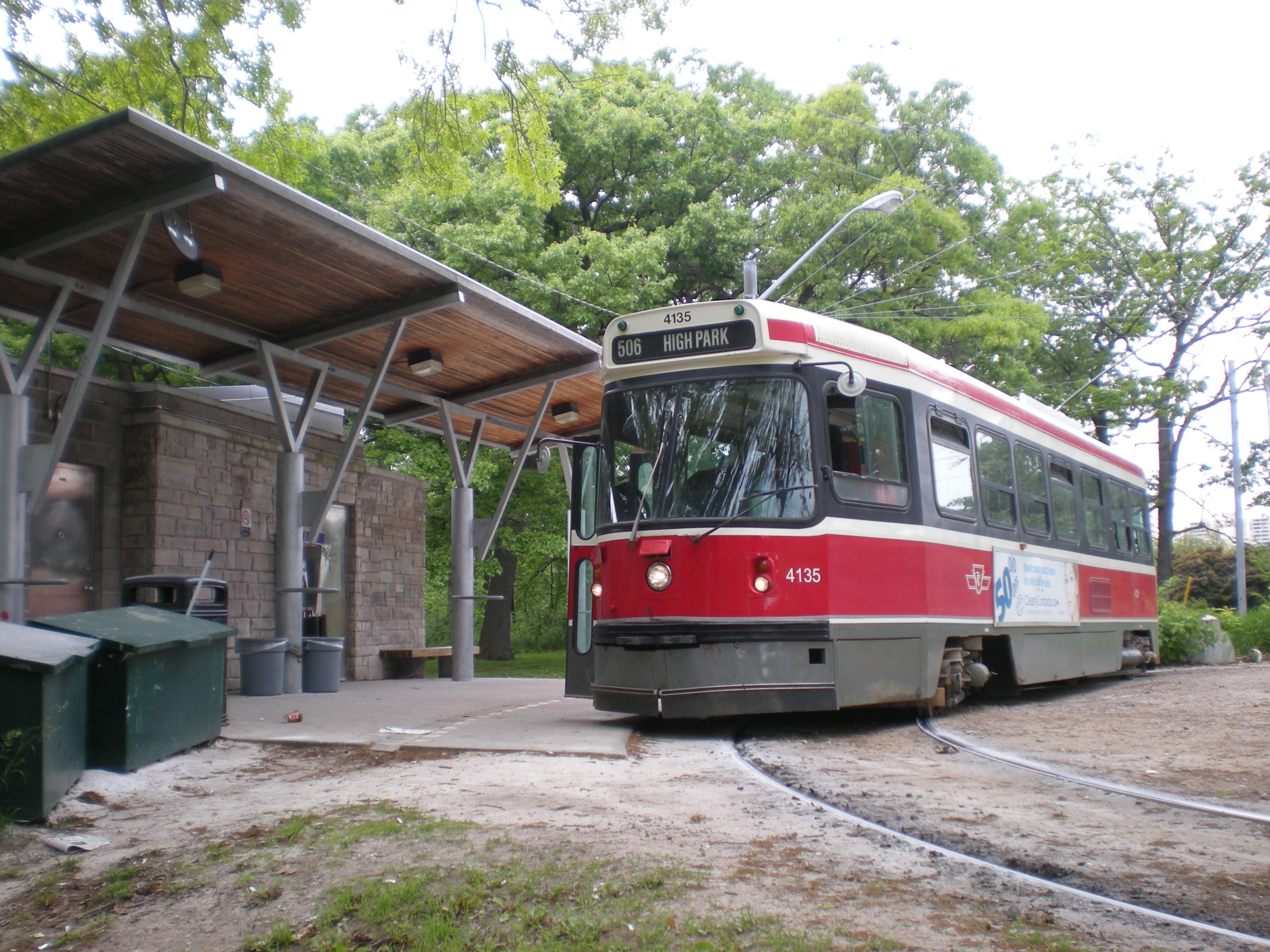

General information
- Location: Toronto, Ontario; Canada
- Coordinates: 43°38′52″N 79°27′29″W
- Owner: Toronto Transit Commission

Other information
- Website: High Park Loop schedule

History
- Opened: 1893
Location

High Park Loop is a turning loop and the western terminus of the 506 Carlton streetcar line of the Toronto Transit Commission (TTC) in Toronto. Streetcars enter westbound straight from Howard Park Avenue across to the west side of Parkside Drive and into the loop at the east entrance to High Park, turn anticlockwise through the loop, and return eastbound through the intersection.

The building at the loop has facilities that include washrooms for operators and the public, and a sheltering canopy over the platform in front.

== History ==
High Park Loop opened in 1893 and was rebuilt in 1922 by the newly created Toronto Transportation Commission, which had taken over and amalgamated existing ageing streetcar systems within the city limits. More recently, in 2000, the shelter and track were modernized and rebuilt.

Sometimes called Howard Park Loop, this is one of two TTC loops to have used High Park as the name of the destination, the other being the Bloor streetcar line's Park Loop, on the south side of Bloor Street at High Park Avenue.
