= Signalling of the Toronto subway =

The Toronto subway uses a variety of signalling systems on its lines, consisting of a combination of fixed block signalling and moving block signalling technologies.

The oldest signalling system is known as automatic block signalling and was designed for the system's heavy rail lines: Line 1 Yonge–University, Line 2 Bloor–Danforth and Line 4 Sheppard. Since 2022, Line 1 had been fully converted to automatic train control (ATC). Both of Toronto's newer lines, Line 5 Eglinton and Line 6 Finch West, use a modern form of ATC called Communications-based train control (CBTC).

== Transmission-based train control (Line 3) ==
Line 3 Scarborough, in operation from 1985 to 2023, used SelTrac IS, a transmission-based train control system originally developed by Alcatel-Lucent (now part of Thales Group) as part of the Intermediate Capacity Transit System (ICTS) technology employed by Line 3, which is identical to that of Vancouver's SkyTrain and the Detroit People Mover. The system was designed to allow Line 3 trains to be driverless; however, due to safety concerns, an operator was stationed at the front of each train in a cab equipped with a display of signal indications; there were no track-side signals. To control train operation, each two-car married-pair had multiple on-board computers communicating with a central computer at Kennedy station. Transit Control at the Hillcrest Complex had a terminal connected to the Kennedy station computer.

== Communications-based train control (Lines 1 and 5) ==
The TTC used "Urbalis 400", a communications-based train control system made by Alstom, on Line 1 Yonge–University. It is engaged in a phased implementation of CBTC to replace the fixed-block signal system on the entire line. CBTC first went live on Line 1 in December 2017 on the newly inaugurated extension between Vaughan Metropolitan Centre station and Sheppard West station. Since then, CBTC has been extended as far as Eglinton station. Effective September 24, 2022, Line 1 had been fully converted to automatic train control (ATC).

CBTC requires a set of equipment on trains and at trackside to gather and transmit data to central computers, and to receive instructions back for train operation. ATC beacons and axle counters sit at track level to detect the passage of a train with the axle counters backing up the beacons. The track-level beacons transmit signals to onboard controllers installed on each train. Onboard roof antennas (Data Communications System antennas) transmit information such as speed and location from the controllers to Trackside Radio Equipment which relays the data to central computers and to the TTC's Transit Control Centre. The central computers send speed and braking instructions back to the train, whereby the central computers are effectively directing each train. With computers operating the train, trains can operate safely on closer headways than with the fixed block system. CBTC allows more frequent service and increased line capacity.

With the old fixed block signal system, the TTC can schedule 25.5 trains per hour on Line 1, occasionally operating up to 29 per hour. With CBTC, the TTC can operate 30 to 32 trains per hour with a more consistent frequency. However, this goal depends on how well the TTC can manage dwell time in stations, crew changeovers and turnaround at terminals.

The grade-separated section of Line 5 Eglinton, between Mount Dennis station and Don Valley station, will also use CBTC. Unlike on Line 1, the system on Line 5 will be supplied by Bombardier Transportation using its Cityflo 650 technology.

=== CBTC territory signal aspects ===
The following signal aspects are used with the introduction of CBTC on Line 1:

Flashing green light: proceed in a CBTC mode (ATO or CABS mode), train is communicating with zone controller (Note: ATO mode enables automatic train operation to the next station in CBTC-enabled territory simply by pressing the yellow "Start" button, and is indicated by a white "A" in a green square on the operation screen. CABS mode enables manual driving while connected to the CBTC system using the master controller handle (also usable in areas where ATO is available and often used when ATO is disallowed in an area due to a work zone), with the maximum permitted speed displayed on screen. This mode is indicated by a white "circle on a stick" icon on a green square on the screen.)

Solid yellow light: proceed on main route in MAN (Note: Manual mode with degraded signalling) mode, route is clear

Flashing yellow light: proceed on diverging route in MAN mode, route is clear

Solid red light: stop

== Fixed block signalling (Lines 2 and 4) ==
As of September 2022, fixed block signalling is used on Line 2 Bloor–Danforth and Line 4 Sheppard, and was used on Line 1 Yonge–University until September 24, 2022. It uses wayside signals to give instructions to train operators, which may be automatic block signals or interlocking signals. This system, also called the NX/UR system of signalling, is also used on the New York City Subway, the Chicago "L", and the MBTA subway in Boston.

=== Overview ===
With fixed block signalling, the line is subdivided into blocks – a section of track that can be occupied by a train. Each block is protected by a signal at the start of the block that train operators must obey, with the signal aspects indicating whether it is safe for a train to proceed into the next block. These signals are connected to a trip arm that has the ability to stop a train if it violates a signal (runs a red light), by triggering an emergency brake application. This safety method is identical to that of the New York City Subway system.

If a train is occupying a block, the two or more signals behind the train will be red, with the trip arms in the danger position so that another train cannot proceed into the area. The distance between signals (and number of signals that are red when a particular block is occupied) is set in accordance with the stopping distance required by the trains. If a train violates a signal, the trip arm would trigger an emergency brake application to stop it before it reaches the train ahead. In other words, for a particular signal to clear, the system requires two or more full blocks ahead of that signal must be unoccupied. This requirement reduces the number of trains that can operate on the line compared to using automatic train control.

Grade timing, a method of speed control, is integrated with the signalling system. Station timing signals, which allows trains to safely run closer together at slower speeds (such as near station stops), are also present.

Headway control, a method of evening out the spacing between trains, is active at certain stations with interlocking (or home) signals. Such a signal turns red as a train passes it, and will remain red for a variable amount of time. This time depends on the distance between the last train that passed the signal, and the train that comes after the next train. This system is computerized, and can accurately calculate the relative distances between trains. If the next train is closer to the train before than the train after, then the signal will hold the train at the station. If the next train is closer to the train after it than the train before it, then the signal will clear.

There are several limitations to this signalling system that can result in "signal problems" and "signal delays". One of the most common problems is track down. A track down occurs when a block gets a false reading and places signals into the danger position even when there is no train occupying the block. This can occur if debris interrupts the block by grounding out the track circuit mimicking the electric circuit caused by an actual train in the area.

When a signal fails to clear, depending on the area, there are three different ways to rectify the situation. At some signals, transit control can perform a "call-on" where an orange aspect blinks and the trip arm is released even when the aspect displayed is red. The second option is a "key-by". Some signals have a plunger that the operator can stop, reach out the window, operate the plunger dropping the trip arm and then operate the train to a less restrictive signal. Where neither of these options exist, the only way to get past a defective signal is to "trip through". The operator at slow speed must trip the signal (which in turn trips the train and places it into emergency). The crew must then reset the emergency valve before proceeding.

=== Block signals ===
Block signals are the most commonly used signals on the Toronto subway. They are used to keep trains properly spaced, and are controlled automatically by the trains themselves based on their distance relative to other trains, as determined by signal block occupancy. The following block signals are used by the TTC.

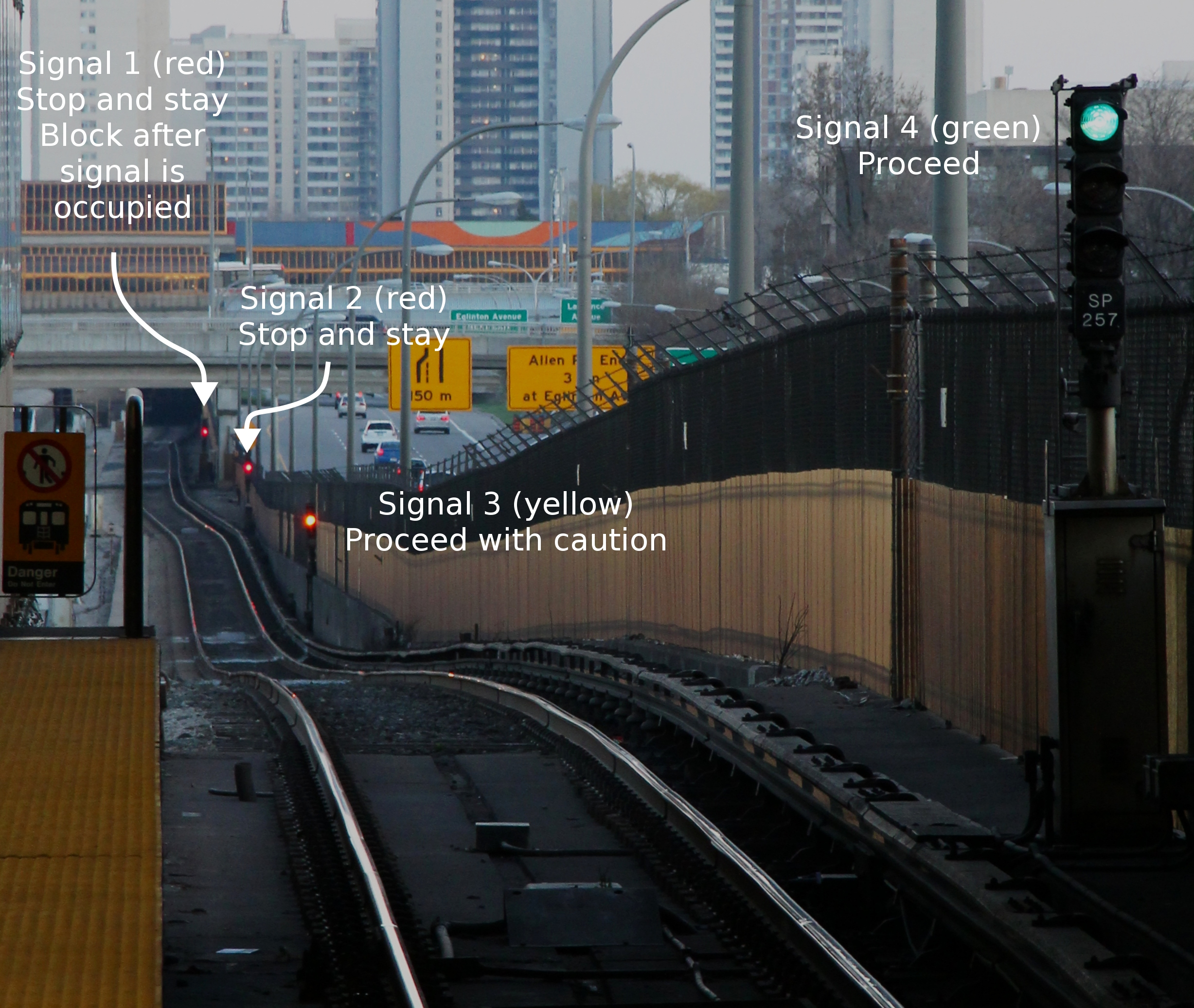
A series of block signals south of Yorkdale station. The pictured signals have since been disused after the implementation of CBTC.

Proceed

Proceed with caution, the next signal is currently red

Stop. Passing this signal trips the train stop.

Entering timed block, the next signal is red only due to grade timing

Timed block, timer has not yet run out (red light flashes when timer is about to run out); next block is timed as well as lunar aspect is indicated (in this example this signal would only clear to yellow)

==== Grade timing (GT) ====
Grade timing (GT) is used to protect sections where a sharp turn requires a speed limit or where a downhill section would cause a train to accelerate to an unsafe speed if the driver were unwary. When entering a signal block which is subject to GT, one of two things controls the signal: the distance to the train ahead, or grade timing. If the current state of the signal is due to proximity of the train ahead, it behaves as a standard block signal. However, once the train ahead has travelled far enough for this signal to clear, the aspect does not immediately change but remains at red. When a train enters the block before the GT signal, a timer is started and the red aspect at the GT signal starts flashing. Once this timer reaches a predetermined time, the signal then clears as normal and the trip arm is lowered. If the train is travelling too fast, it will reach the GT signal before the timer expires and the trip arm will force the train to stop.

The signal at the start of block before a GT signal has an additional white light (termed "lunar aspect" by the TTC) below the other aspects, which illuminates when the following GT signal is at red only due to grade timing. Where there are several consecutive GT signals, a lunar aspect will be present on the signal at the start of each timing block. A flashing red without the lunar aspect (not included in the images above) would be used for the signal at the end of the last block of a GT section.

In addition to lunar white signals, grade timed sections are sometimes indicated by a sign with the letters "GT", or simply "T", in white.

==== Station timing (ST) ====
Station timing is used to reduce the separation distance between trains that are operating at slower speeds. It is typically used in and around station platforms, allowing a second train to safely move closer to an already-occupied platform than would otherwise be possible. As with GT signals, a timer is started when a train enters the block preceding the ST signal. If the timer expires before the train reaches the ST signal (i.e. the train is travelling slower than a defined speed), the number of blocks ahead of the ST signal that need to be unoccupied for the signal to clear is reduced. This reflects the shorter braking distance of a train travelling slower than the maximum permitted speed.

=== Interlocking signals ===
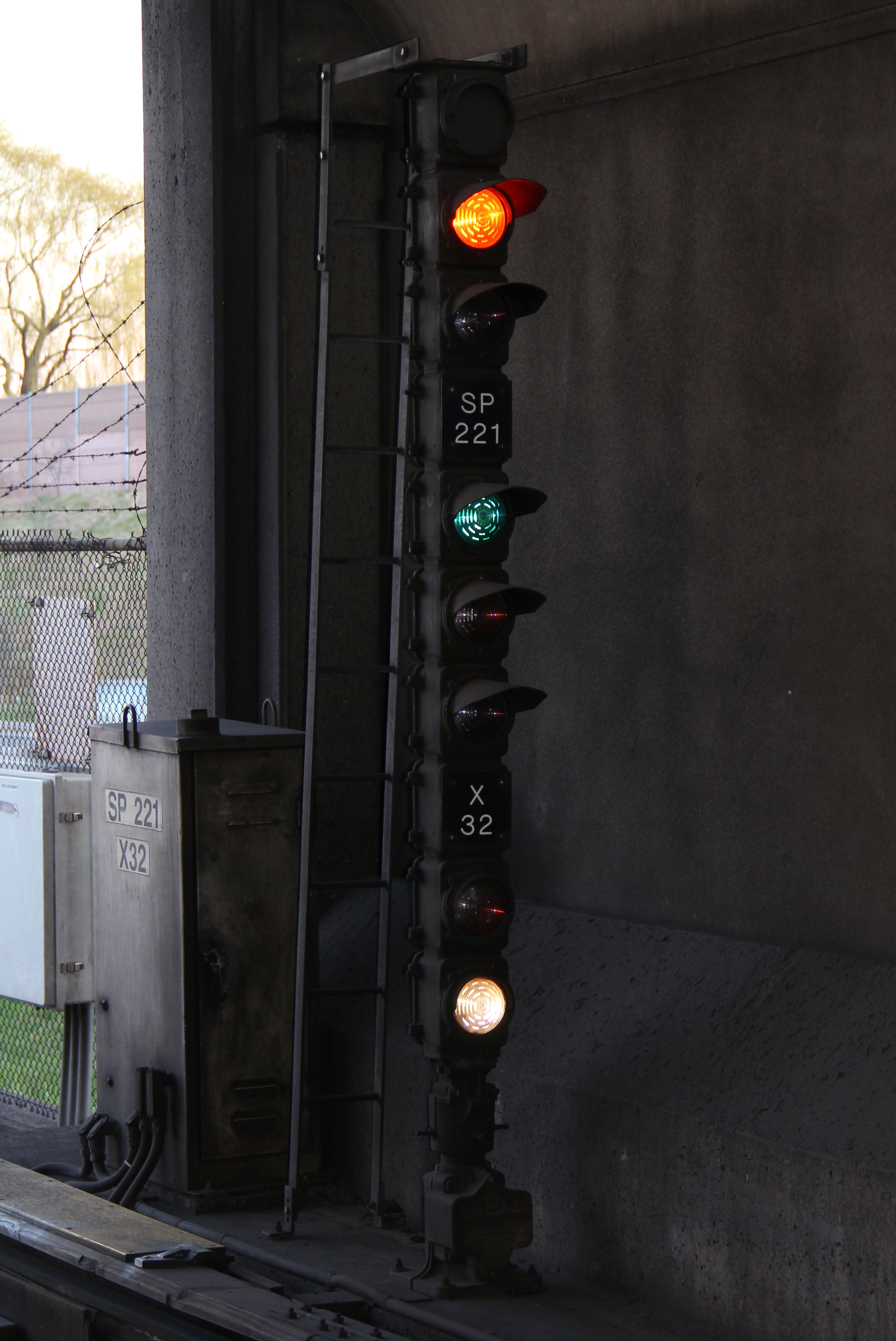
A TTC interlocking signal on Line 1 Yonge–University. The pictured signal is no longer in use since the implementation of CBTC.

Interlocking signals are typically used in interlockings, which are any areas where train movements may conflict with each other. They are controlled by either human operators or a computer, not automatically by the movement of trains. Interlocking signals also tell train operators which way points are set. The following interlocking signals are used on the TTC.

Proceed, points set to straight

Proceed with caution, points set to straight, next signal is currently red

Proceed with caution, points set to diverge.

Stop and stay

Call on (train has been given permission to pass red signal)

Entering timed block, points set to straight, next signal is red only due to grade timing

Entering timed block, points set to diverge

Timed block, timer has not yet run out (top red light flashes when timer is about to run out); next block is timed as well as lunar aspect is indicated (in this example this signal would only clear to yellow over green)

Interlocking signals can also include grade timing and station timing, which functions in the same way as for block signals. For GT interlocking signals, only the top red aspect will flash while the timer is running, the bottom red aspect remains constantly lit.

=== Signal numbers ===
All signals have an alpha-numeric number that relates to their location within the subway system. The number is assigned using the Chain system of measurement, whereby a signal's number is assigned based on the nearest chain measure.

Each line or portion of a line has an assigned letter, and that precedes the number ascertained by the Chain measure. Signals that are on a northbound portion of track use the nearest even valued chain measure, where signals on a southbound portion of track use the nearest odd valued chain measure.

Line	Signal prefix	Even	Odd	Chain 0 mark
Yonge (no longer uses block signalling)	N (northbound only, former); S (southbound only, former)	Northbound	Southbound	Did not exist (continued from the University numbers)
University (no longer uses block signalling)	U (former)	Northbound	Southbound	South of St. George station (counted up towards Museum)
Spadina (no longer uses block signalling)	SP (former)	Northbound	Southbound	North of St. George station (counted up towards Spadina station)
Bloor-Danforth	B	Westbound	Eastbound	West of Kipling station (counts up towards Islington)
Sheppard	SH	Westbound	Eastbound	West of Sheppard–Yonge station (counts up towards Bayview)

== Temporary signals ==
In work zones, staff place yellow beacons on the track bed between the rails to inform train operators that a "slow order" or "reduced speed zone" is in effect; the first beacon is usually accompanied with a speed restriction sign indicating the speed limit for the affected area. A green beacon indicates the end of a work zone and allows operators to resume normal operation. In outdoor sections, yellow and green flags are also used for the same purpose. A flashing blue light at track level indicates workers may be present, subway operators are required to sound their horn, and follow the signals of track workers when approaching and passing them.

== See also ==
- 1995 Russell Hill subway accident
- New York City Subway signaling
- Railway signalling
