= Toronto Rocket =

Rolling stock of the Toronto subway system

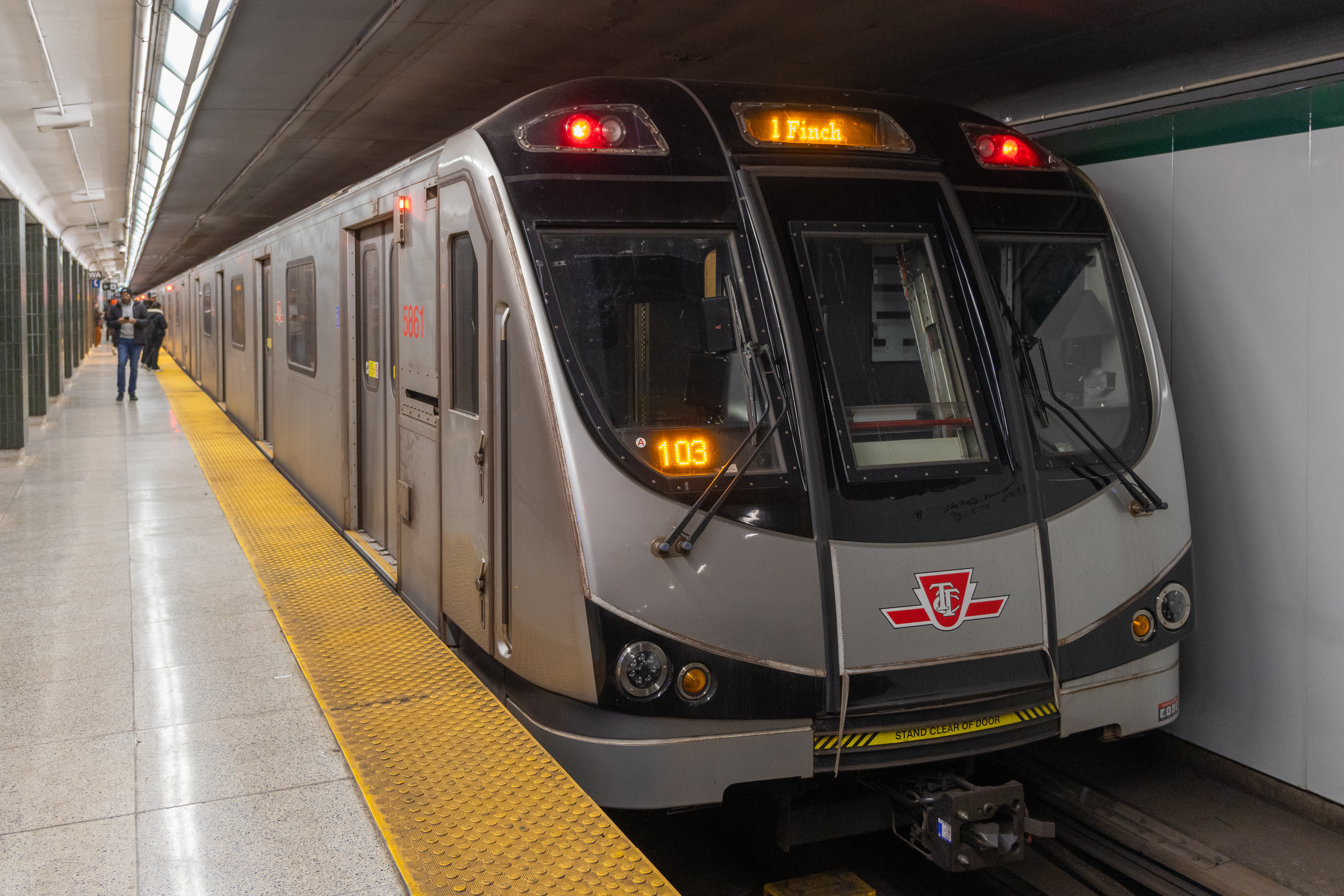
- Toronto Rocket subway train at St. Andrew station

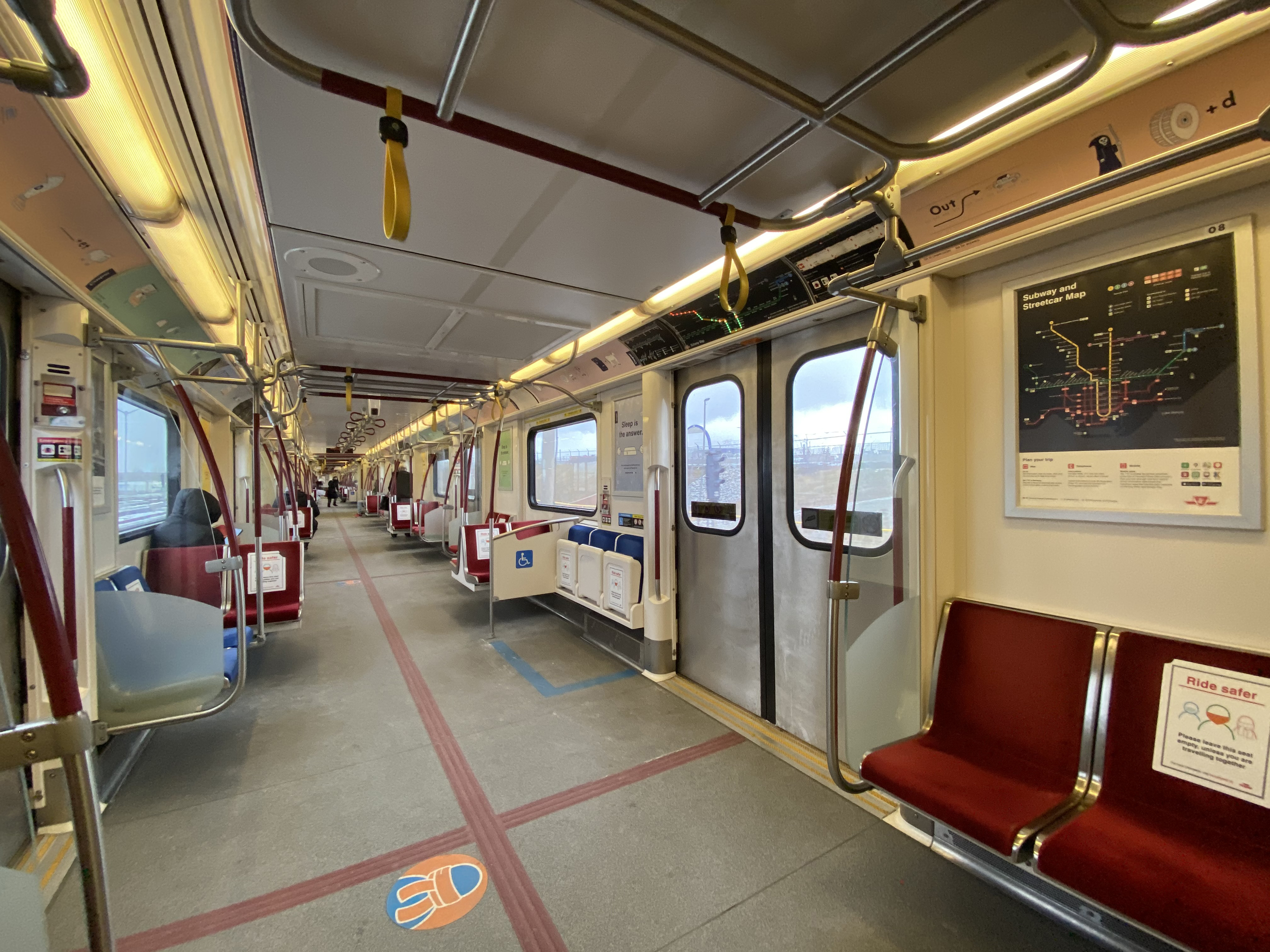
- View along full length of train
- In service: 2011–present
- Manufacturer: Bombardier Transportation
- Built at: Thunder Bay, Ontario
- Family name: Movia
- Replaced: H4, H5, H6
- Constructed: 2009–2015
- Number built: 480 (82 trainsets)
- Formation: 6-car set (Line 1); 4-car set (Line 4)
- Fleet numbers: 5381–6196
- Capacity: Seated; 400 (6-car set); 264 (4-car set); Crush load; 1,458 (6-car set); 948 (4-car set)
- Operator: Toronto Transit Commission
- Depots: Wilson Yard; Davisville Yard
- Lines served: Yonge–University; Sheppard

Specifications
- Car body construction: Stainless steel
- Train length: 137.82 m (452 ft 2 in) (6-car set); 92.1 m (302 ft 2 in) (4-car set)
- Car length: 23,190 mm (76 ft 1 in) (end cars); 22,860 mm (75 ft 0 in) (intermediate cars)
- Width: 3,137 mm (10 ft 3 1/2 in)
- Height: 3,645 mm (11 ft 11 1/2 in)
- Floor height: 1,105 mm (3 ft 7 1/2 in)
- Doors: 8 sets (4 sets per side) per car
- Wheel diameter: 711 mm (28 in)
- Wheelbase: 2,083 mm (6 ft 10 in)
- Maximum speed: 88 km/h (55 mph) train max; 75 km/h (47 mph) service revenue max
- Weight: 205,500 kg (202.3 long tons; 226.5 short tons) (per trainset); 34,250 kg (33.71 long tons; 37.75 short tons) per car
- Traction system: Bombardier MITRAC TC1420 IGBT–VVVF
- Traction motors: 155 kW (207.9 hp) 3-phase AC induction motor
- Power output: 3.1 MW (4,157.2 hp) (6-car set); 1.86 MW (2,494.3 hp) (4-car set)
- Acceleration: 0.9 m/s^{2} (3.0 ft/s^{2}) (limited)
- Deceleration: 1.35 m/s^{2} (4.4 ft/s^{2}) (service); 1.5 m/s^{2} (4.9 ft/s^{2}) (emergency)
- Auxiliaries: 120/208 V AC battery auxiliary
- Electric systems: Third rail, 600 V DC
- Current collection: Contact shoe
- UIC classification: 2′Bo′+Bo′Bo′+Bo′Bo′+Bo′Bo′+Bo′Bo′+Bo′2′ (6-car set); 2′Bo′+Bo′Bo′+Bo′Bo′+Bo′2′ (4-car set)
- Minimum turning radius: 75 m (246 ft) (horizontal); 610 m (2,000 ft) (vertical)
- Braking systems: Regenerative and pneumatic
- Safety system: Emergency evacuation ramps at each end of trainset
- Track gauge: 1,495 mm (4 ft 10 7/8 in) Toronto gauge

The Toronto Rocket (TR) is the fifth and latest series of rolling stock used in the Toronto subway system in Toronto, Ontario, Canada. Owned and operated by the Toronto Transit Commission (TTC), the trains were built by Bombardier Transportation in Thunder Bay, Ontario, to replace the last remaining H-series trains, as well as increase capacity for the Spadina subway extension to Vaughan that opened in 2017. They operate in a six-car configuration on Line 1 Yonge–University and a four-car configuration on Line 4 Sheppard. The sets are stored and maintained at the Wilson and Davisville Yards. The first six-car TR train entered passenger service on Line 1 in July 2011, and four-car TR trainsets entered service on Line 4 in May 2016.

The TR series is the newer of the two currently active series of rolling stock on the heavy-rail lines in the Toronto subway network, featuring a completely new design based on the Bombardier Movia family of trains. They are the first subway trains in North America equipped with full-open gangways, which allows passengers to see and walk through the entire length of the train. They are currently the only ones in Toronto compatible with the communications-based train control (CBTC) system, which replaced the legacy fixed-block signalling system in several phases on Line 1 between 2017 and 2022 (starting with the Line 1 extension to Vaughan Metropolitan Centre station, which opened on December 17, 2017) and has used only one operator since November 2022, who plays the dual role of driving the train and of opening and closing the doors.

The trains were designated under the production name as T35A08 before the name "Toronto Rocket" was chosen through a contest open to the public. They are jointly funded by the City of Toronto (Toronto Transportation Services), the Government of Ontario (Ministry of Transportation), and the Government of Canada (Transport Canada).

== History ==
The initial order was signed in 2006 for the delivery of 234 cars, making 39 six-car fixed trains, which allowed for the retirement of the H4 and H5 subway cars (the H6 cars, though primarily serving Line 2, were also later retired). Manufacturing of the TRs began in 2008. Delivery was expected to begin in late 2009, and they were scheduled to enter passenger service in early 2010. However, delivery was delayed by the bankruptcy of a key part manufacturer, Curtis Doors, which was to install door components for the TTC's TR subway trains.

On May 6, 2010, the TTC voted to exercise a contract option with Bombardier for an additional 186 cars, making 31 six-car fixed train sets. This allowed for the retirement of the older H6 series trains, and to have enough TR trains to meet future ridership demands for the opening of the Spadina Subway extension to Vaughan Metropolitan Centre station (signed as "1 Vaughan" on the train's front and rear exterior signs and "Line 1 towards Vaughan" on exterior side signs for brevity), which was originally scheduled for opening in mid-2015 (in time for the opening of that summer's Pan American Games). However, the opening of the extension was delayed until December 17, 2017.

On October 1, 2010, the first train set (5391–5396) was delivered to Wilson Yard. It was unveiled to the public and media at Downsview station (later renamed Sheppard West in mid-2017 in preparation for the opening of the extension to Vaughan) on October 14, 2010.

Between October 2010 and July 2011, the TR trains underwent a series of testing and training runs on Line 1. The first TR trainset (5411–5416) entered passenger service on Line 1 with two-crew members on July 21, 2011. The purchase of ten additional train sets (60 cars) was authorized in March 2014, bringing the total number of TR stock to 80 six-car train sets and 480 cars. In March 2015, the TTC reported that the T1 trains running on Line 4 would have to be replaced with TR trains before conversion of Line 1 to automatic train control (ATC) (which was initially to be fully rolled out by 2020, but was delayed until 2022) and that the TTC would report soon on the option of converting an existing six-car train to a four-car train to test one-person train operation (OPTO) (which had been in place on the S-series trains on Line 3 Scarborough from its inception in 1985 until its decommissioning in 2023). They entered service on Line 4 on May 30, 2016, with two crew members, before switching over to OPTO on October 9, 2016. OPTO was later rolled out on Line 1 in phases between 2021 and 2022.

In mid-2016, some TR trains were used on Line 2 to address the shortage of T1s caused by faulty air-conditioning units after Toronto mayor John Tory accepted a challenge posted on Twitter to ride an overheated T1 train on Line 2 during a hot summer day.

Seat restricted sign used in TTC vehicles during the COVID-19 pandemic

During the COVID-19 pandemic, certain seats on the Toronto Rocket were prohibited from use to encourage social distancing; these seats were marked with large laminated signs stuck with adhesive to the upper velour-covered part of the fixed seats (including the half-seats) and either to the top or the bottom of the automatic folding seats, depending on the individual train.

== Design ==
The TR series trains have a similar interior design to that of the T-series cars, also built by Bombardier in the same facility, but have several new features that make them more accessible and user-friendly for passengers. They include:

- A four- or six-car fixed configuration with full open interior gangways, departing from the married pair of previous models, allowing riders to move freely from one end to the other. This led to an increase in capacity by ten percent on the lines in which they were used.
- Double the number of accessible seats for passengers using mobility aids per car compared with the T-series cars, with automatic folding seats to accommodate devices such as walkers, wheelchairs, bicycles and strollers. These are marked with exterior blue lights on each car adjacent to the doorway nearest to the accessible seating area. These designated priority seats are covered in blue velour; general seating is covered in red velour.
- A colour scheme consisting of white cream walls, unpainted stainless steel doorways, and grey floors with red, high-visibility floor markings and stanchions wrapped in red vinyl to assist visually impaired passengers. Antimicrobial properties are present on these and on various other surfaces.
- Enhanced passenger information systems in all cars, consisting of:
  - Digital multi-coloured LED signs that indicate the name of the next station. These signs also indicate if the station offers connections to other Toronto subway lines and other public transit service providers – such as GO Transit, Ontario Northland or York Regional Transit – or the final station of the line along with visual arrows and audible messages that indicate which side the train doors will open on at the next stop (except for the final stations of the line).
  - Electronic LED route maps that indicate which stations have been served and which stations are next
  - Warning messages when the doors are closing alongside the three-tone chime "Please stand clear of the doors"
  - Video screens are also present, displaying safety messages and TTC-related advertising and the name of the next station at the bottom.
- Improved safety systems for use in the event of an emergency, such as two-way passenger assistance intercoms for passengers to communicate with the train crew and built-in evacuation ramps located at the ends of the train to allow for faster and easier evacuation. Each car also has four ceiling-mounted CCTV cameras for passenger safety and security. Footage is recorded and can be reviewed in the event of an incident.
- Full-width operator cabs located at the ends of the train for the enhanced safety and security of operating personnel. They are equipped with doorways to allow operators to access the cab unit directly from the subway platform and prevent exposure to the public while performing operating duties. The railfan window (which allows passengers to see from the front or rear of the train), present on T-series trains in the emergency doorway, is replaced with a one-way mirror in the cab access door from the interior, though it is still possible to see through the window. The cab also has a slanted end design for better aerodynamics with bright orange digital LED exterior destination and three-digit run number signs at the ends of each trainset in place of the rollsigns used on previous models.
- Half-seats are located near the cab doors for commuters to lean on during peak periods.

=== Retrofits ===
Additional yellow plastic straps (placed underneath the HVAC units) along with audible door opening side announcements (based on direction of train travel), (except for terminal stations) to better assist visually impaired passengers, were installed in all TR trains as of January 2016. Additionally, all TR trains were retrofitted with external speakers, along with exterior side destination signs, that audibly announce the route and destination of the train.

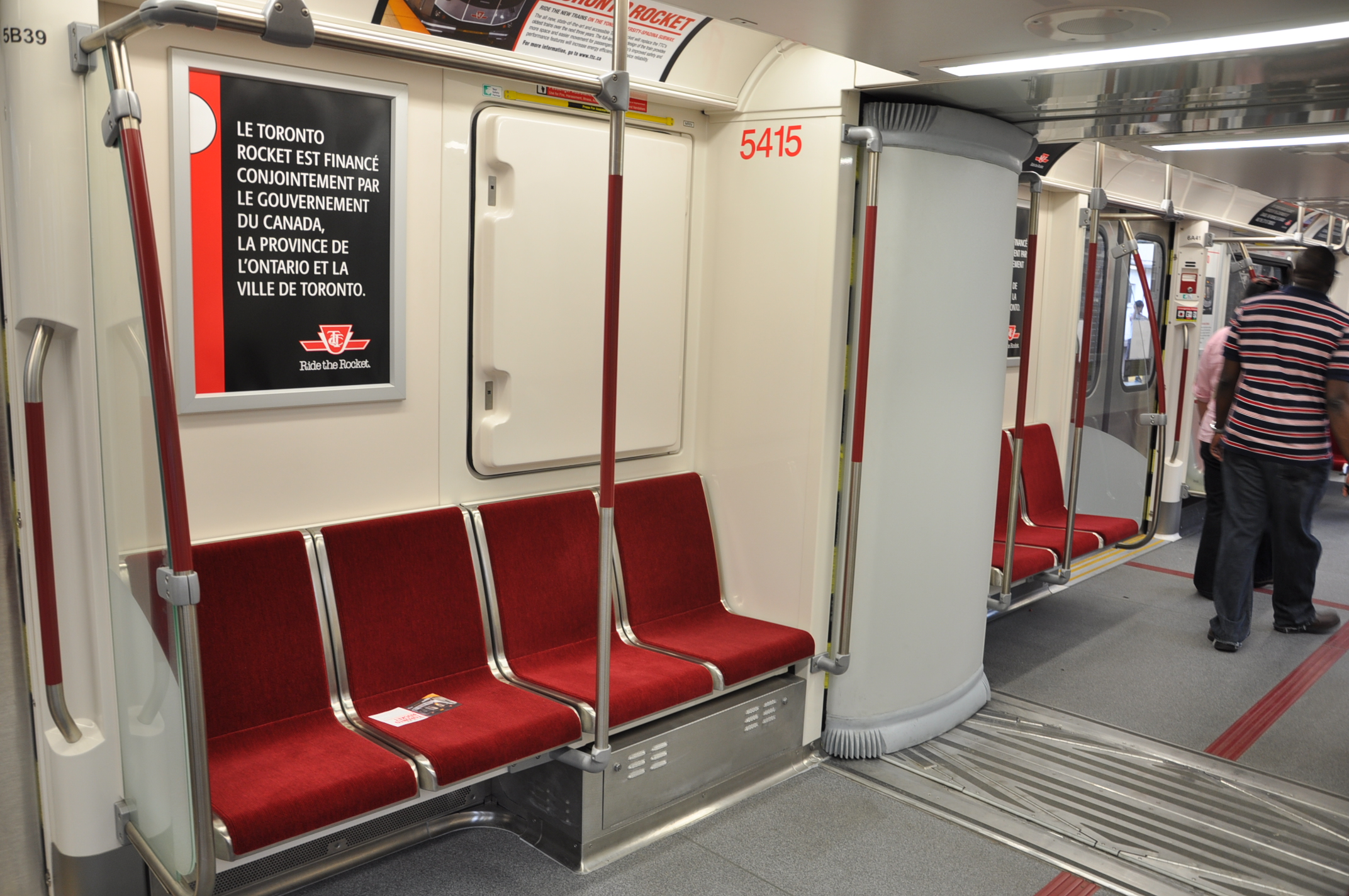
Gangway between cars. The poster, in French, when translated into English, reads "The Toronto Rocket is jointly financed by the Government of Canada, the Province of Ontario, and the City of Toronto."

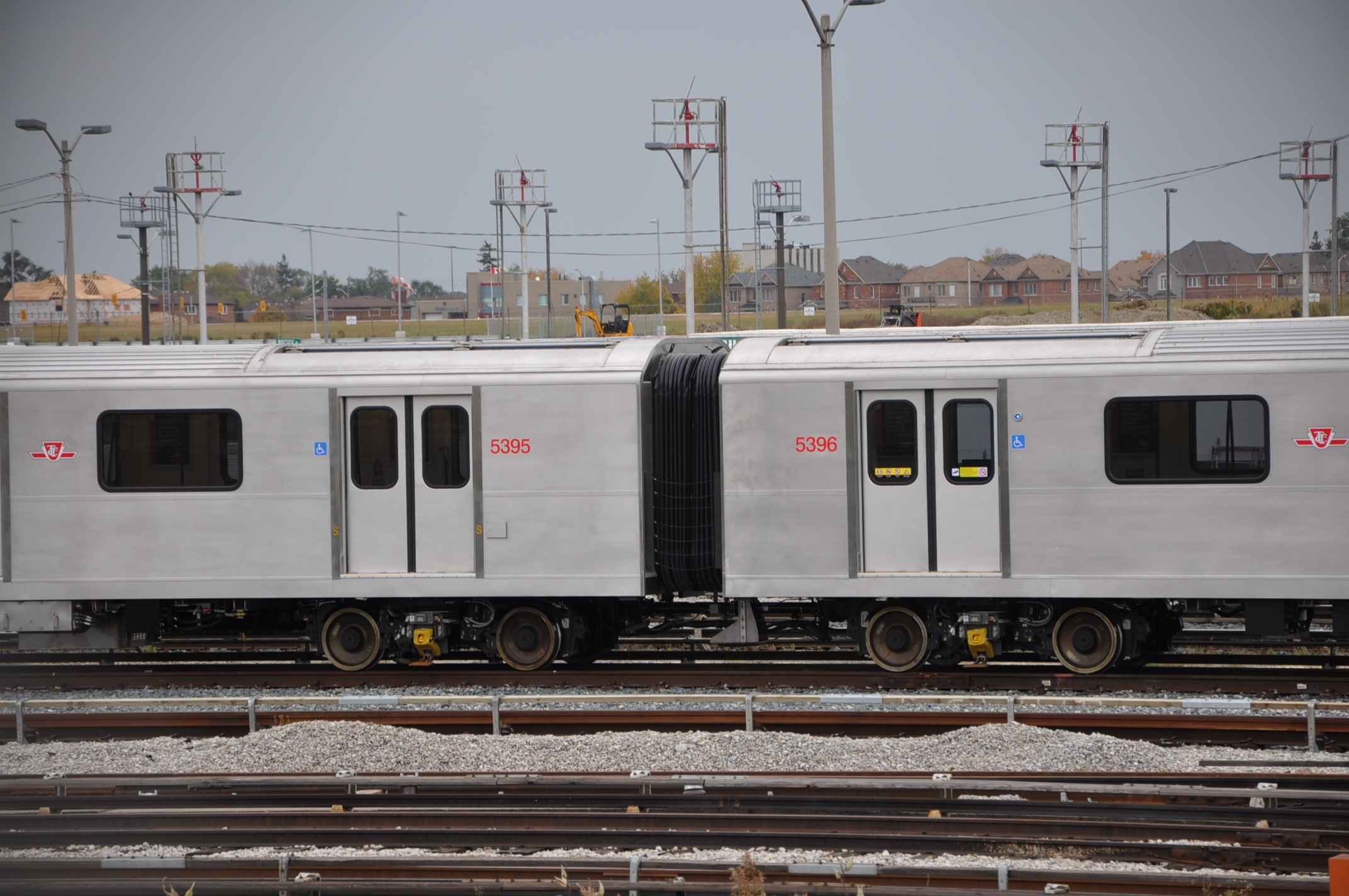
Exterior view of the gangway, seen at Wilson Yard

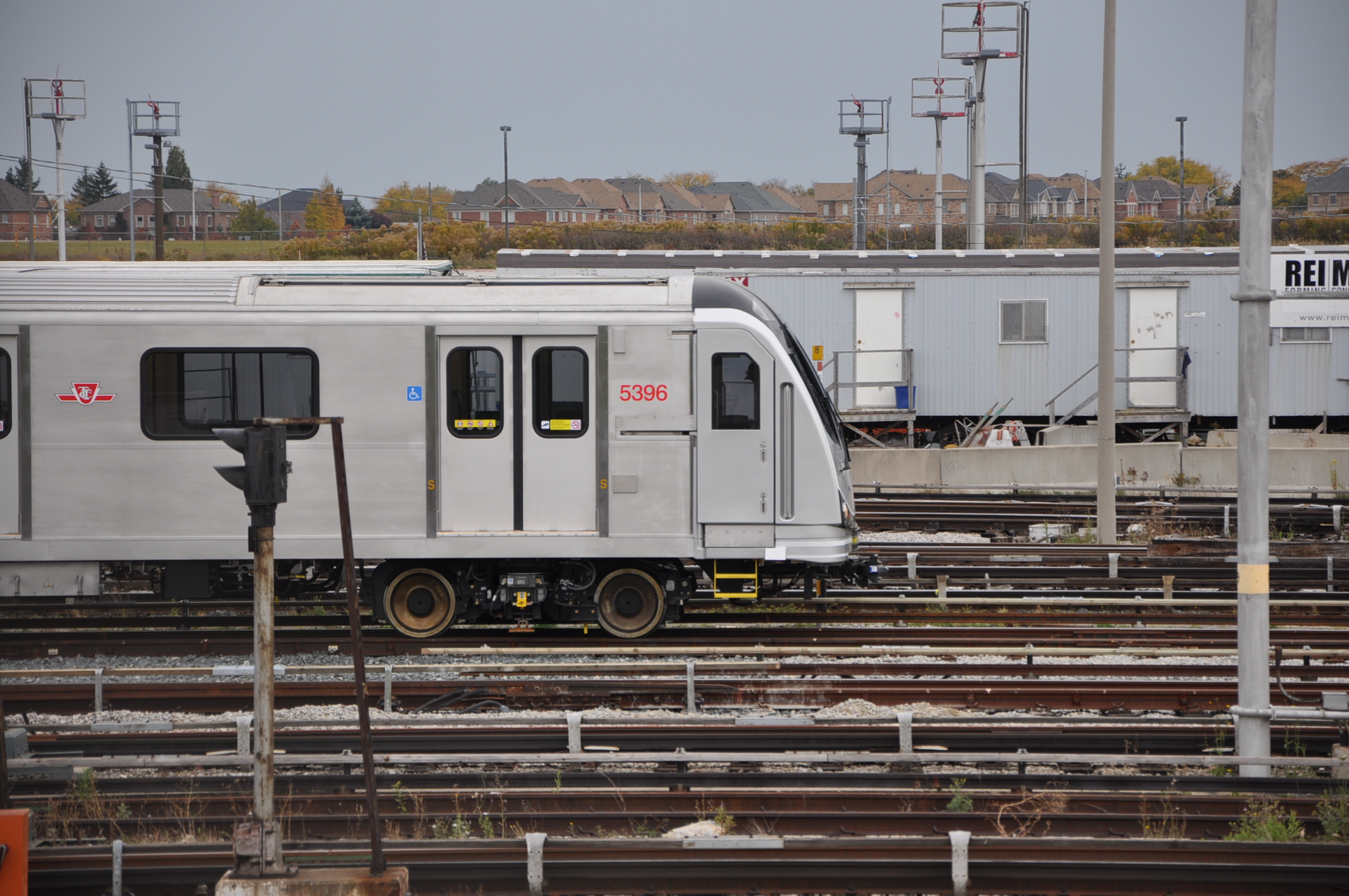
Side view of end car, seen at Wilson Yard

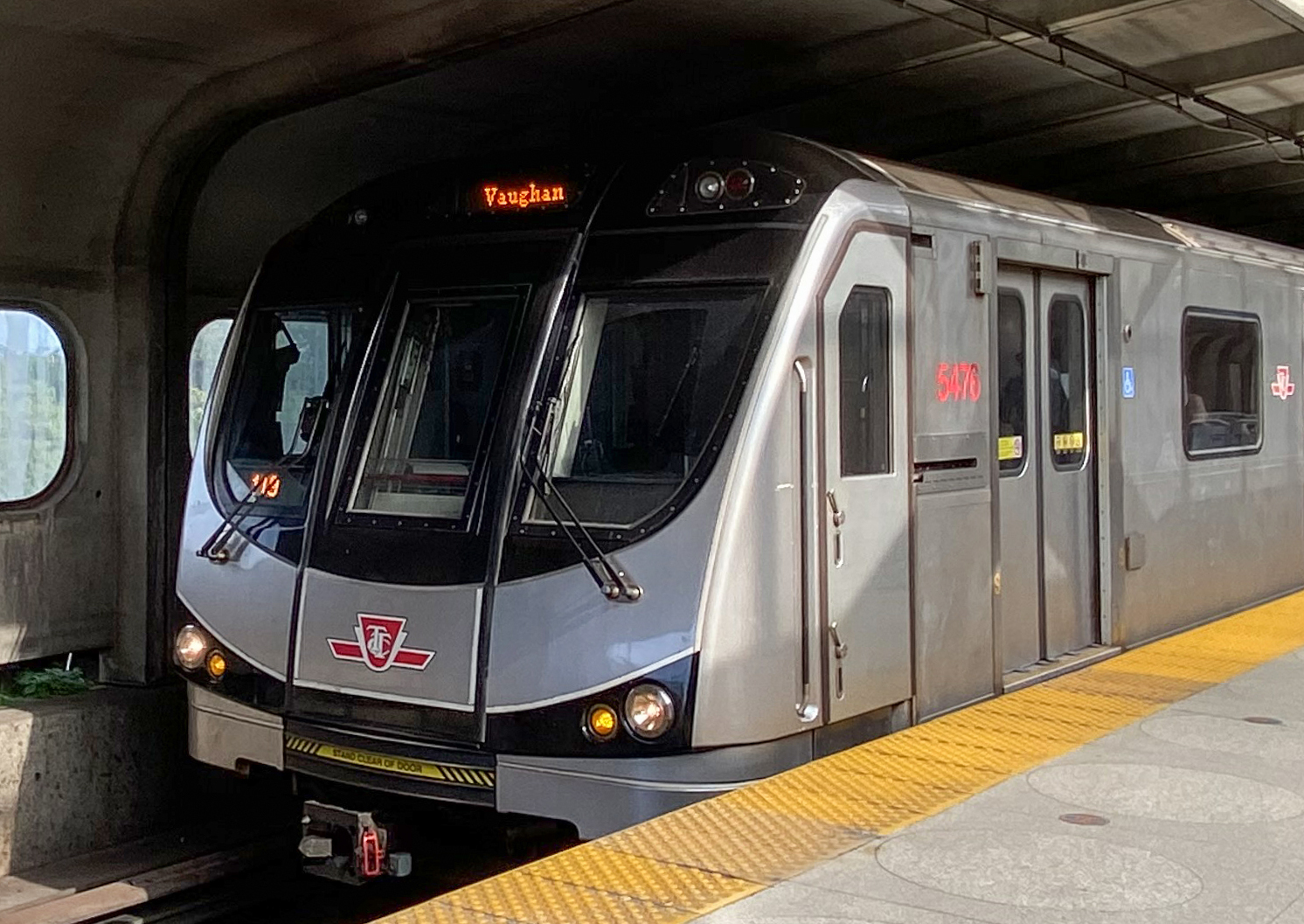
Front view of end car at Yorkdale station

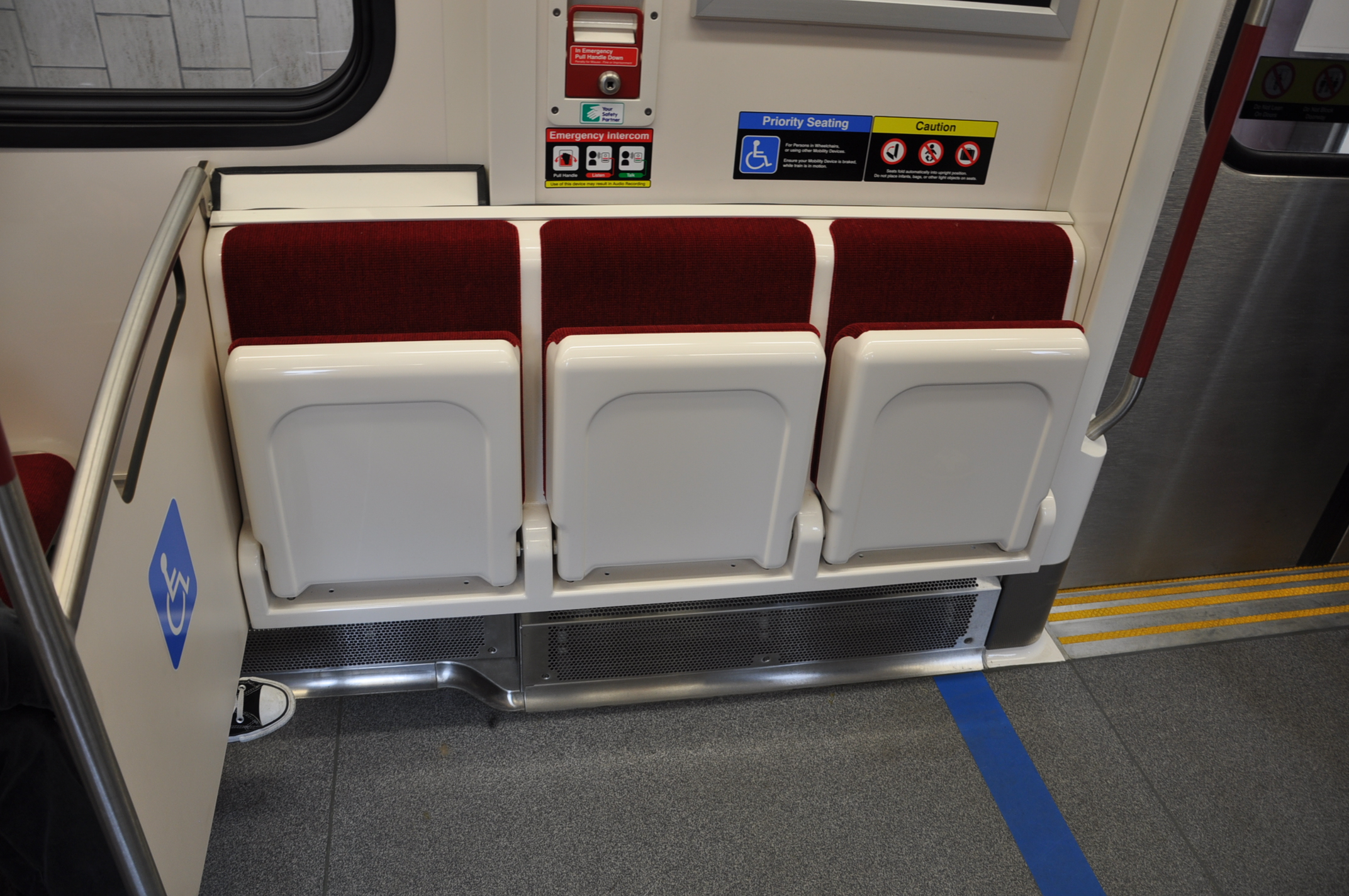
Automatic folding seats in wheelchair accessible position; depending on the individual train, some of these seats use blue velour instead to mark accessibility.

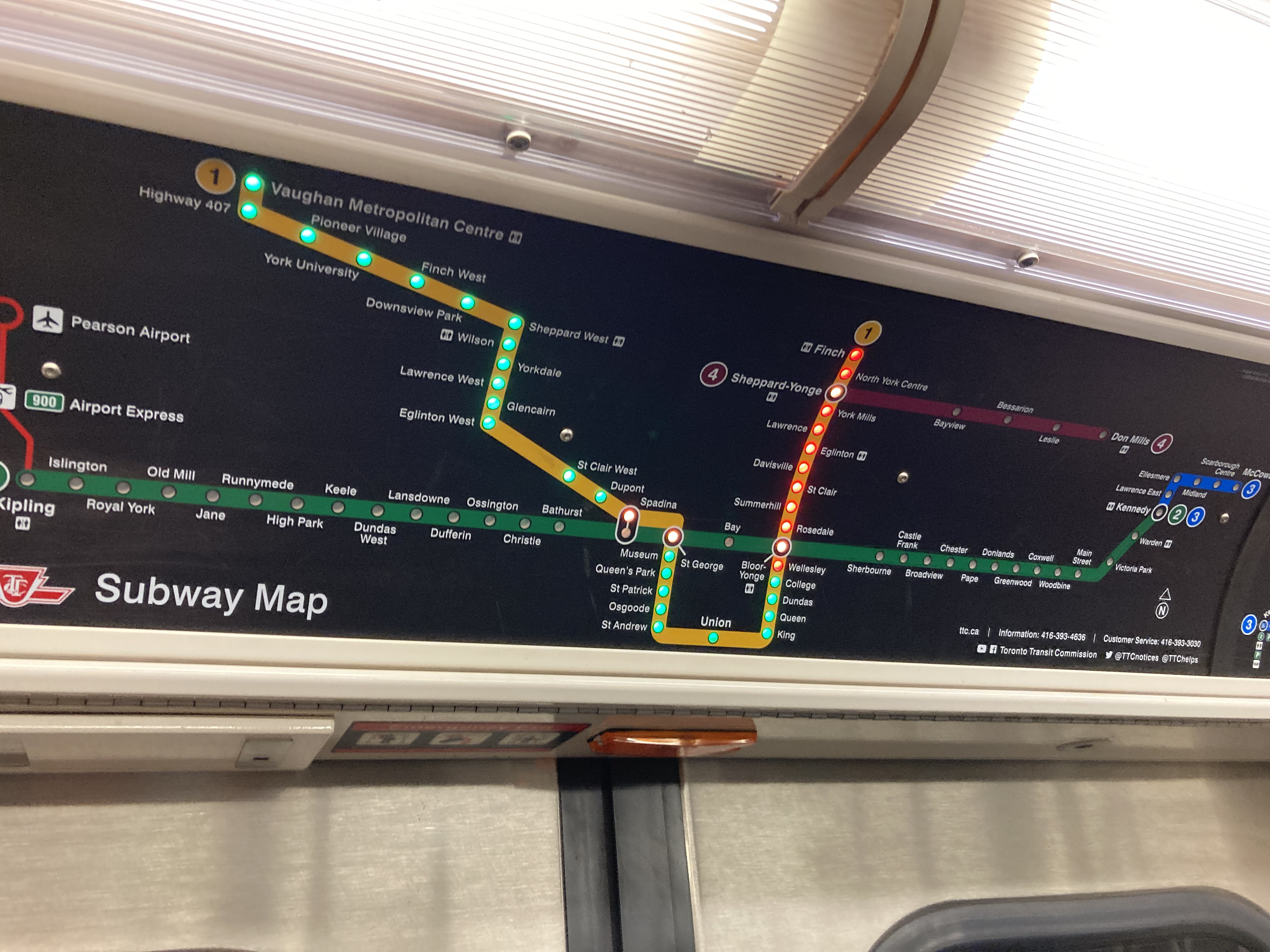
LED-lit map of the system

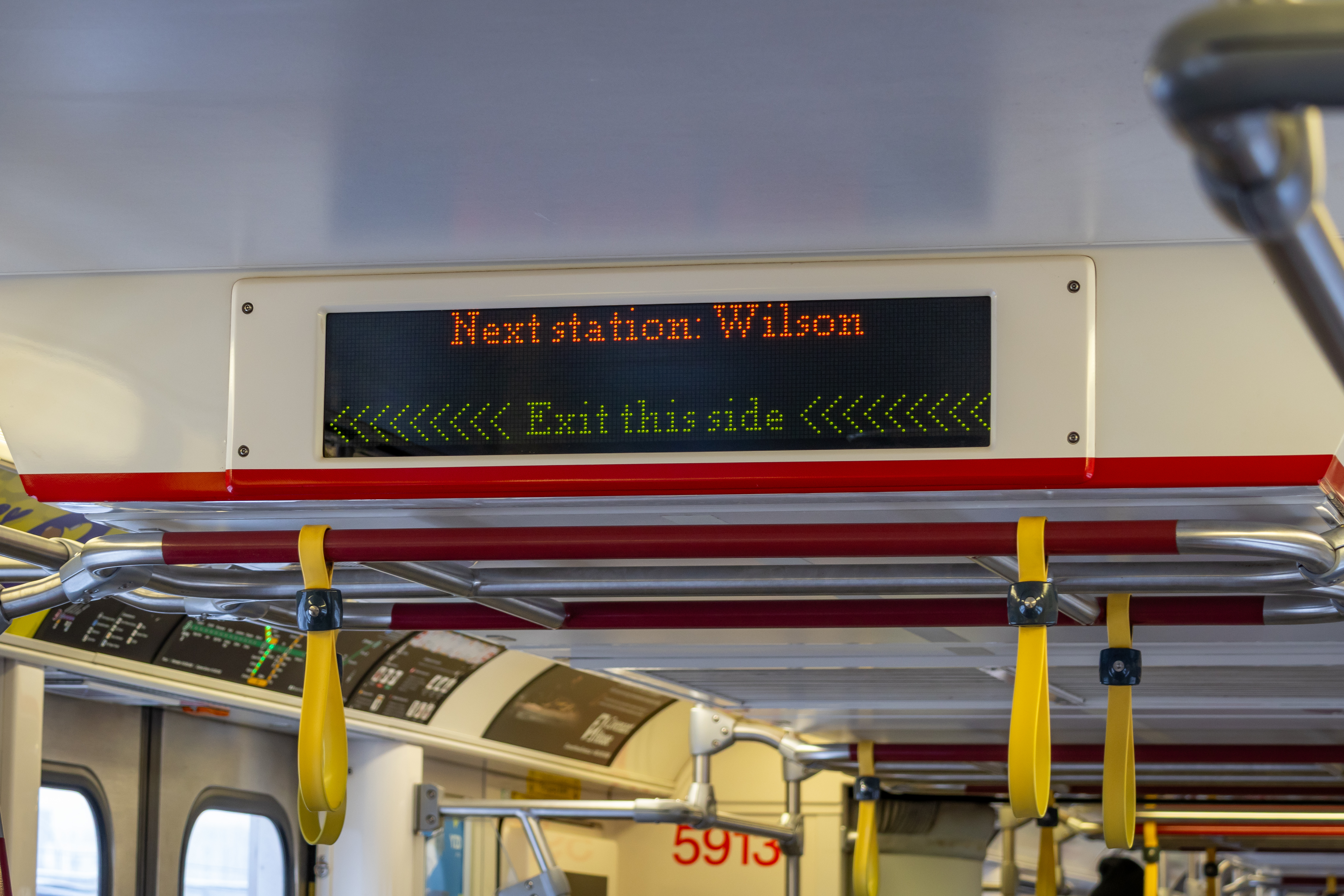
Digital multi-coloured LED signs showing the next station, these signs also show if the station offers connections to other TTC subway, light rail lines and other public transit service providers or the final station of the line along with visual arrows showing which side the doors will open on at the next stop (except final stations of the line).

== Lines serviced ==
- Yonge–University line (July 21, 2011 – present)
- Sheppard line (May 30, 2016 – present)

== Criticism ==
=== Tendering process ===
During the tendering process, Oakville-based Siemens Canada (see Siemens Modular Metro) was seen as a possible competitor to the Bombardier bid. Councillors Karen Stintz (who later also served as TTC chair), Denzil Minnan-Wong, and Rob Ford (who became mayor in late 2010) were opposed to sole-sourcing the contract to Bombardier. They alleged that many sole-source advocates had union ties and were thus not interested in getting the best financial deal available to the city.

=== Mobility issues ===
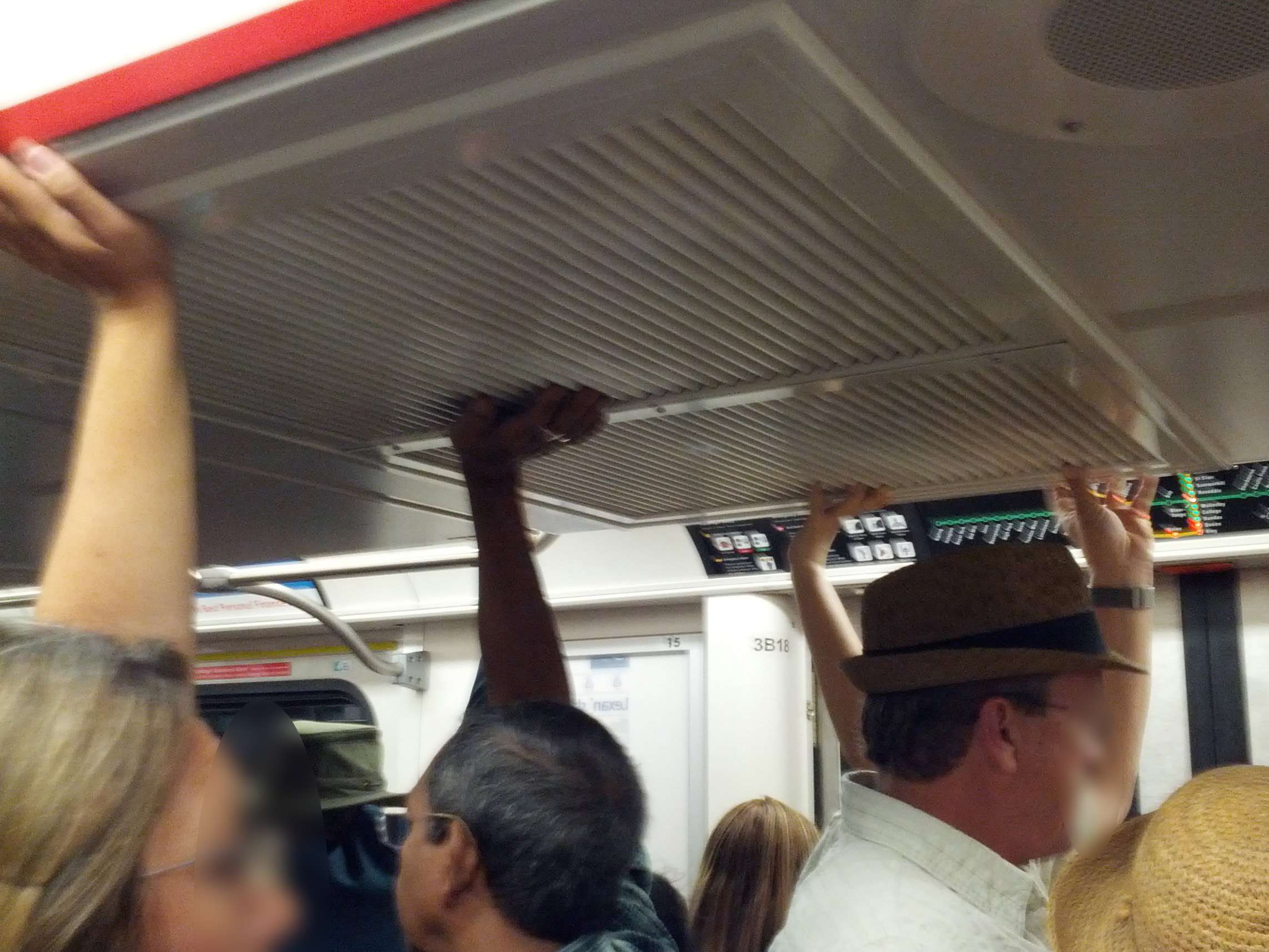
Toronto subway riders holding on to an overhead ventilation unit at each end of the train car for stability

In late September 2011, it was reported that some passengers with mobility devices were experiencing difficulties while boarding or alighting the then-new TR trains. TTC officials noted that this could either be because the train was sitting too high in relation to the level of the platform or be the result of the train's door threshold, which is not parallel with the platform and/or the number of passengers riding on the train. They were actively looking for ways to solve the problem.

To increase mobility, the train does not have centre poles, leaving standing riders with fewer places to hold. There are swinging handles hanging from a lateral pole along the length of each car near the ceiling, except near car ends, where an overhead ventilation unit is located.

=== "Teething issues" ===
In March 2012, TTC officials admitted that the door threshold incidents were the result of "teething issues". Another issue that was acknowledged involves a short delay in opening of the doors when the train pulls into a station. On the older train models, the door release interlock could be triggered just before or immediately after the vehicle comes to a complete stop. The TR trains must come to a complete stop with confirmation from the onboard computer before the door interlock can be released and the guard can open the doors. This causes a one- or two-second delay from the time the train appears stopped and the time the doors open.

In December 2012, the TTC announced that it had demanded a high-level meeting with Bombardier regarding ongoing performance problems related to "teething issues" with the doors. TTC officials admitted at the time that the new TR trains cannot move until all doors are fully closed (as with the older trains) and if the doors fail to close thrice consecutively fully, the TR train would require a system reboot, meaning that the train would have to be pulled out of service until it was resolved. This has led to several delays on Line 1.

== Gallery ==
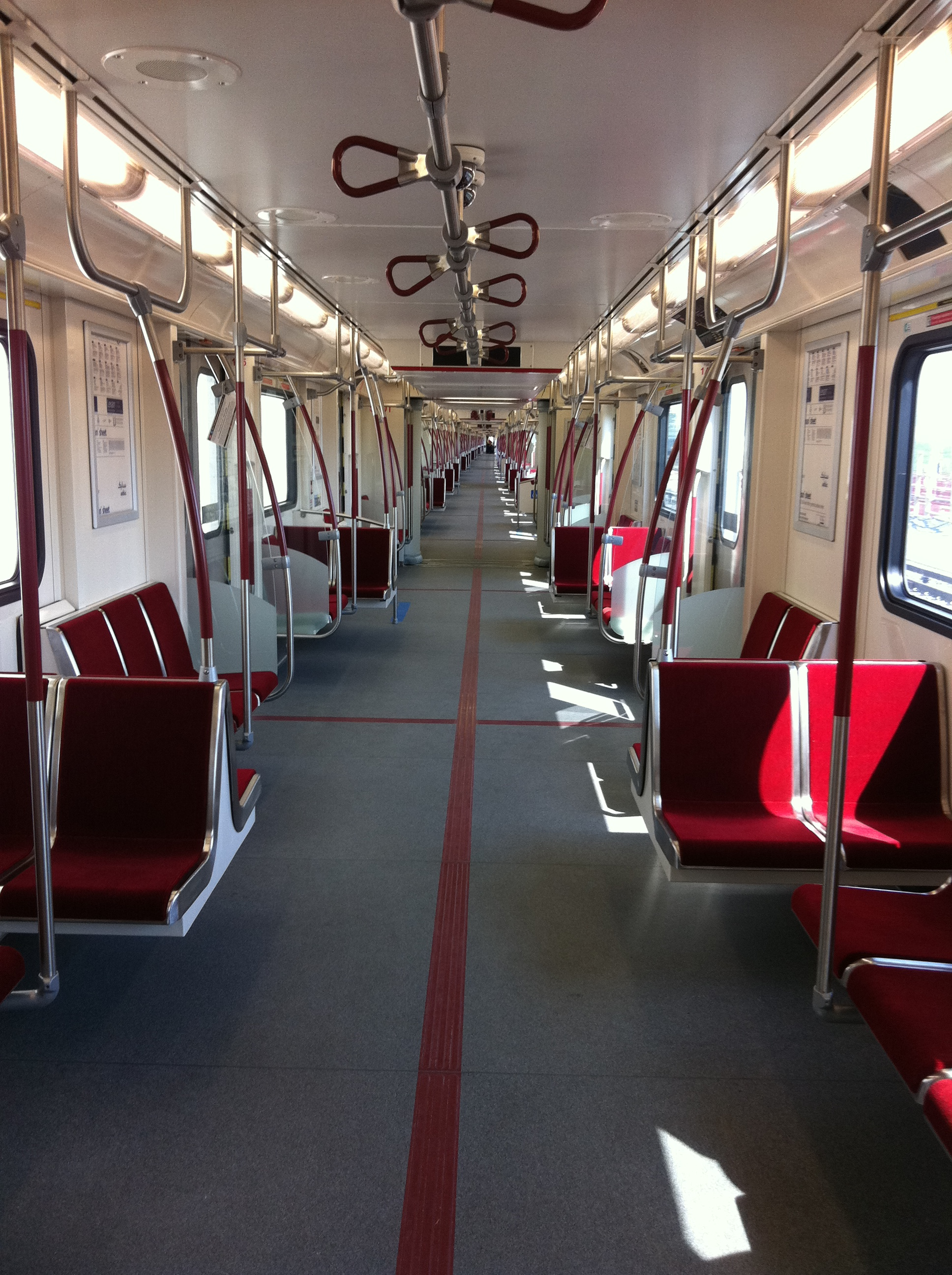
Toronto Rocket corridor gangway

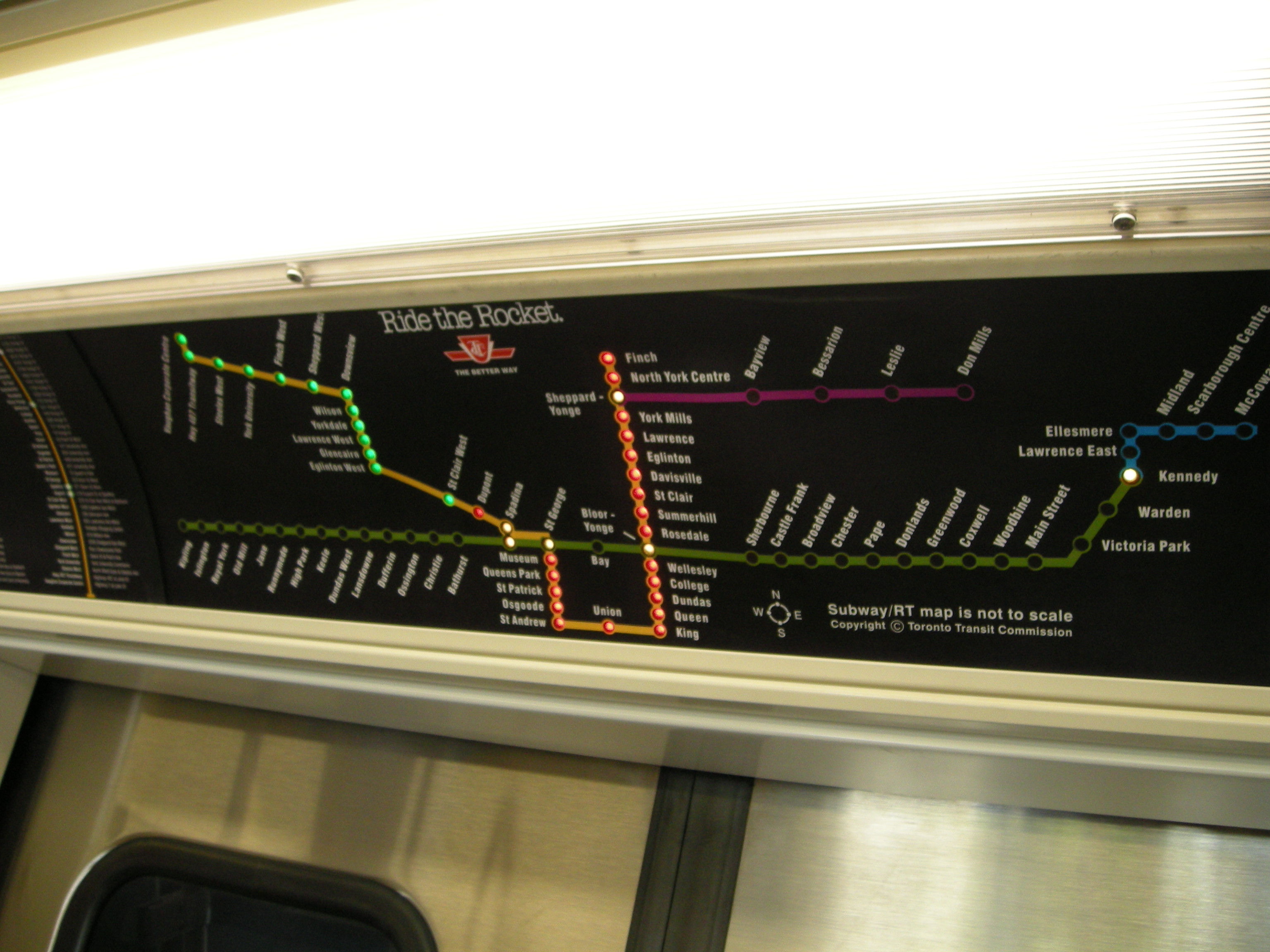
Sample active route map on display in the interior mockup of the Toronto Rocket car

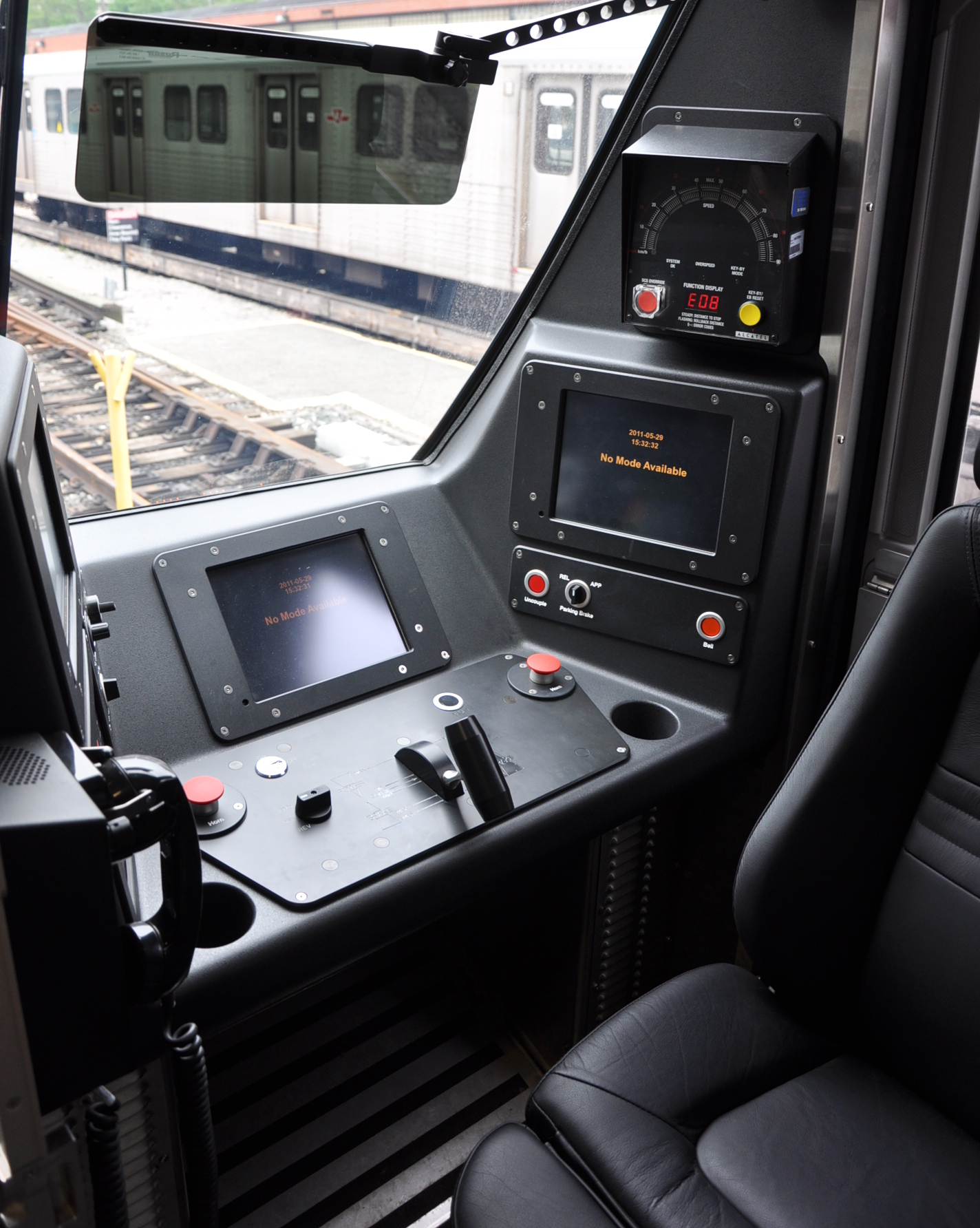
Toronto Rocket cab

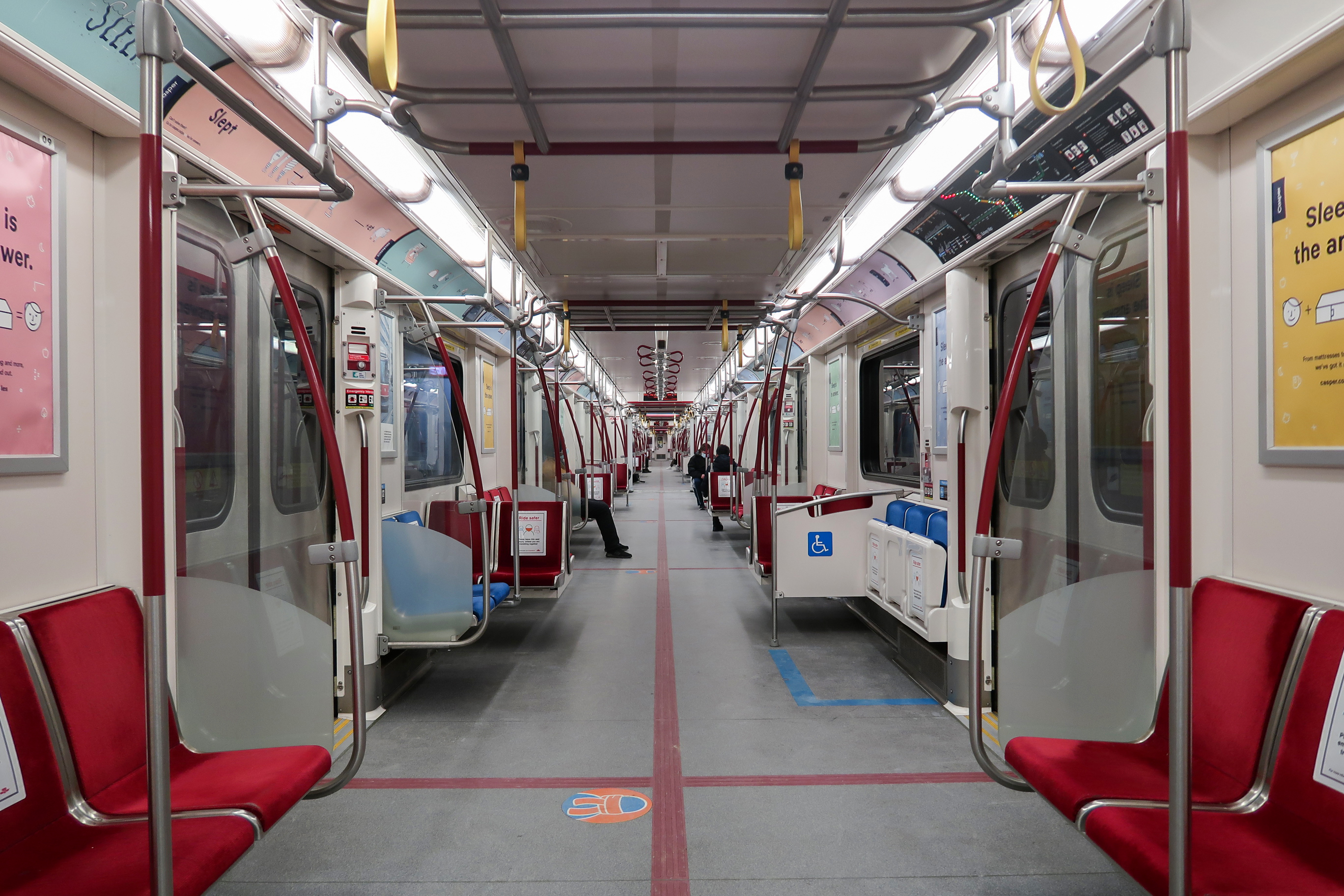
Toronto Rocket interior

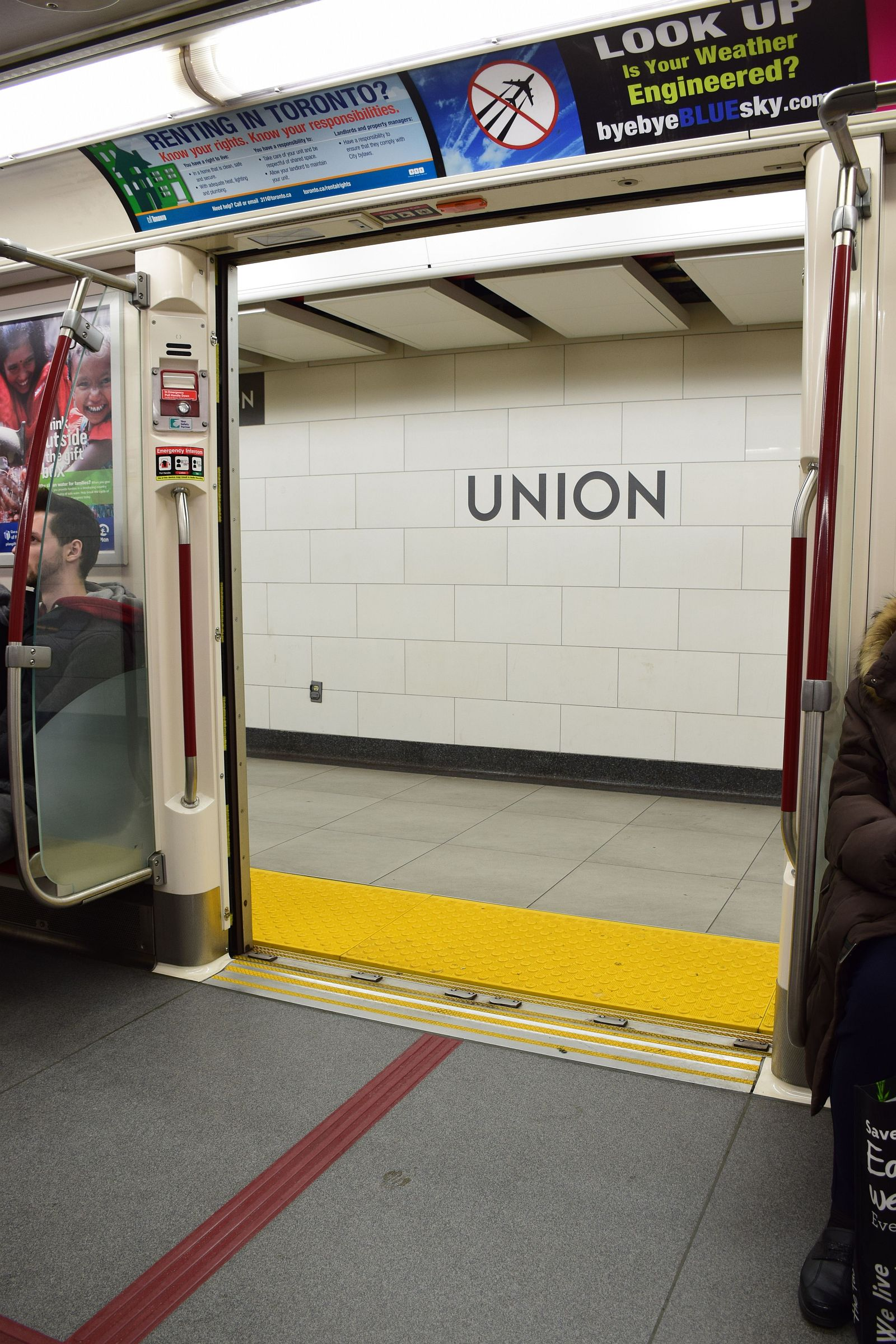
Toronto Rocket train at Union station

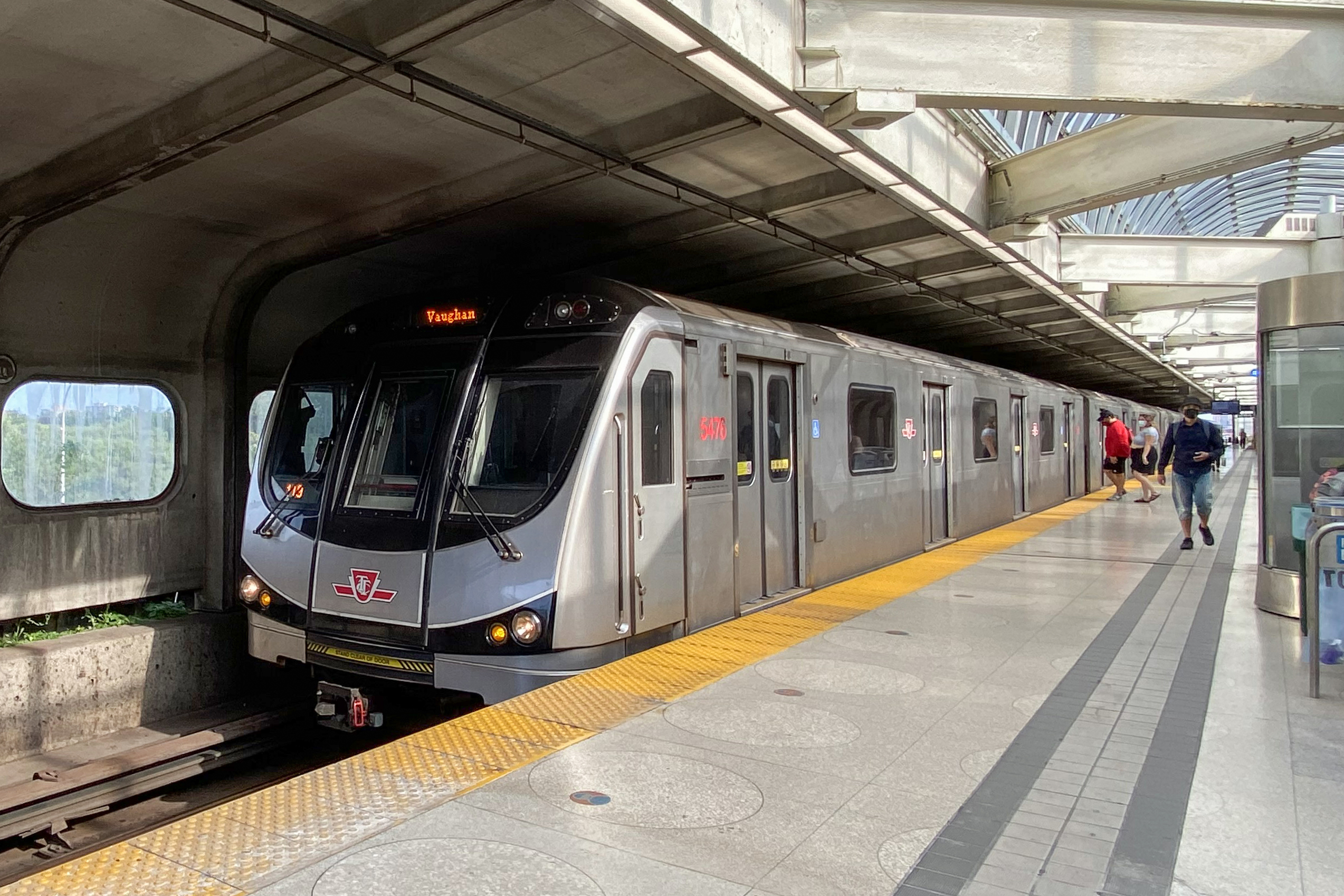
Toronto Rocket train at Yorkdale station

== See also ==
- Bombardier Movia
- Toronto subway rolling stock
