= Moving block =

Type of railway signalling system

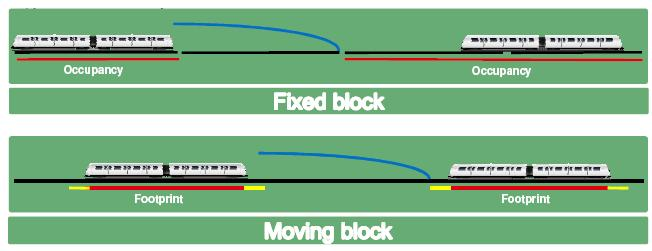
The safety distance (safe-braking distance) between trains in fixed block and moving block signalling systems

In railway signalling, a moving block is a signalling block system under which the "blocks", or safe zones around trains, are defined in real time by computers. That requires both the knowledge of the exact location and the speed of all trains at any given time, as well as continual communication between the central signalling system and the signalling system in the train cab.

Moving block allows trains to run closer together (reduced headway) while maintaining the required safety margins, thereby increasing the line's overall capacity. It can be contrasted with fixed block signalling systems.

Communications Based Train Control (CBTC) and Transmission Based Signalling (TBS) are two signalling standards that can detect the exact location of trains and transmit back the permitted operating speed to enable the required flexibility. The European Train Control System (ETCS) also has the technical specifications to allow moving block operations, though no system uses it currently, apart from test tracks. Information about train location can be gathered through active and passive markers along the tracks, as well as train-borne tachometers and speedometers. Satellite-based systems are not used because they cannot work in tunnels.

Traditionally, moving block works by having a series of transponders in the rail corridor that have a known location. When a train travels over a transponder, it will receive the identification information allowing the train to know precisely where on the network it is. Because trains also have the ability to determine their own speed, that information can be combined and transmitted to the external signalling computer at a rail operations centre.

Using a combination of time and speed, the computer can add the time since the train passed the transponder, and the speeds it has travelled at during that time, to calculate exactly where the train is, even if it is between transponders. That allows the signalling system to give a movement authority to a following train, right up to the rear end of the preceding train. As more information comes in, that movement authority can be continuously updated, thereby achieving the "moving block" concept. Each time a train passes a transponder, it re-calibrates the location allowing the system to retain accuracy.

Technologically, the three most difficult parts to achieve a moving block railway system are:

1. Continuous communication between a signalling system and all trains.
2. Proving the train is intact
3. Reliability

Moving block signalling could not effectively be implemented until the invention of reliable systems to communicate both ways between a train and a signalling system. While such technology has existed for decades, the impracticality of early systems made it unviable for many years. Pulse codes were used on the first version of the London Underground Victoria line's signalling system. However, a pulse code two-way communication system, using the computational technology at the time, would have been complicated, so a fixed block system was used instead.

Train integrity (proving the train remains intact), while not a complicated problem on short suburban and metro lines, becomes a much more difficult problem when dealing with a variety of different train types, train lengths, and locomotive-hauled trains (as opposed to Multiple Units). The only way a moving block system knows where a train is, is from the train's own identification of where it is. Traditionally, signalling systems use external means, such as axle counters and track circuits, to determine the location of a train. What that means is that most trains have no way of positively confirming that the entire train is still connected. Such systems can easily be added to multiple-unit passenger trains, especially if their cars are very rarely separated, but the implementation of technology to do the same with locomotive-hauled trains is significantly more involved. Every effective solution requires expensive technology, the cost of which may outweigh the benefits of the moving block system.

Another version of the moving block system would be to locate computers solely on the trains themselves. Each train would determine its location in relation to all the other trains, and set its safe speeds using that data. Less wayside equipment is required compared to the off-train system but the number of transmissions is much greater.

== Standards and Brands ==
"Moving block" is not technically a standard. It is a concept that can be implemented using various standards.

=== CBTC ===
CBTC is the most common associated standard. However, CBTC, as it is described in IEEE 1474 (1999), makes no mention of a requirement for moving block operation. That said, the overwhelming majority of moving block systems use a signalling system consistent with the IEEE 1474 (1999) standard. Many different manufacturers create systems consistent with the IEEE 1474 standard, but very few of them (if any) are compatible with each other.

- Thales Seltrac
- Bombardier CITYFLO (various versions)
- Alstom Urbalis (various versions)
- Siemens Trainguard MT CBTC
- Nippon Signal SPARCS
- Invensys Sirius
- Argenia SafeNet CBTC
- CAF Optio CBTC Option Solution

=== TBTC ===
Transmission-based Train Control (TBTC) is an earlier form of CBTC that used induction loops on the track for communication with the signalling system, rather than radio signals or some other method. The words "transmission" and "communication" are synonyms in some circumstances, so neither one of those names accurately describes what each standard is. Systems considered to use TBTC are:

- London Underground Jubilee Line
- Docklands Light Railway
- Positive Train Control The US standard for a modern train protection system is considered by some to be an example of TBTC; however it potentially is better described as an Automatic Train Protection system, though "advanced" versions exist that allow for moving block signalling.

=== ETCS ===
ETCS is the signalling protocol for the European Rail Traffic Management System (ERTMS). That system is commonly known to have three levels: Level 1 (an ATP system only); Level 2 (a virtual block system that can also be provided with Automatic Train Operation (ATO)); and Level 3 (similar to Level 2 but uses moving block and can do away with a lot of the lineside equipment). In practice, level 3 is not yet used, and has become an extension of Level 2. Equipment is produced by various manufacturers, but that standard has protocols, so all ETCS equipment is compatible, unlike CBTC systems.

== Capacity advantages ==
Theoretically, moving block can provide capacity advantages compared to fixed block systems. In practice, however, such advantages are difficult to fully realise.

The main reason for that is a combination of the way railway networks actually operate, and tolerances within the moving block system.

While a moving block system can technically allow a train to get as close as it can to the train in front, while still retaining enough space for it to be able to stop (using regular service brakes) should a further update to the movement authority is not received, in practice if a train was to drive that close to the train ahead, the tiny inconsistency between the movement authority updates would require frequent braking applications and likely result in the train tending to travel further behind. Most moving block systems also operate with a buffer to account for that, so trains might be 10 to 30 metres off the ideal, or "perfect" positioning. That helps to account for the transmission delays, and the slight inconsistency in train positioning calculations. Additionally, transmission between the train and the signalling system isn't literally continuous. Instead, it is sent as packages of information, from several times per second to as infrequently as several seconds between transmissions. In practice, that means movement authority is given as several metre sections at a time, often with a buffer and a slight delay from the actual position of the train ahead. So a similar level of performance could be achieved using very small fixed blocks. That is how the Moscow Metro, and London Underground Victoria Line operate. They do not have moving blocks, but have a large number of closely spaced "virtual" blocks. Those networks are often considered to be two of the highest-capacity railway lines in the world.

The second reason why capacity is not necessarily improved, is because trains operating on a railway line with stations must make station stops. This time spent in a station ("dwell time") means that, on 95% of the railway, trains won't travel nearly as close to each other as they technically would be able to if there were no stations. Consider that a two-track railway with four parallel platforms at stations (two per direction) can have more or less double the frequency of the same line, but with only two platforms at stations (one per direction) even if both lines use equivalent signalling systems. That reality means that most of the benefits of a moving block signalling system can only be achieved in and around stations. However, almost all railways have an operational requirement that a following train cannot begin to enter the train platform, until the rear of the previous train has completely departed. That effectively acts as a "fixed" block, even on moving block systems, and will limit the train frequency on the line to only that which is possible using conventional signalling. Most of the benefit networks gain from using moving block actually comes from the increased consistency of train movement obtained from ATO. However, ATO is possible even without moving block.

Moving block can increase the capacity of a line if that limitation is removed from the system, which purportedly has been done on some railway networks, such as the Hong Kong MTR and, at some stations, under certain conditions, on the New York City Subway's BMT Canarsie Line (L train). However, there is no available verification of that. Additionally, if it was permissible to give the following train movement authority past the rear of the leading train (up to the point where the rear of the leading train would end up if its emergency brakes were applied) capacity could be further increased. However, that has never been done and is considered unsafe.

One advantage of moving block systems generally is that less lineside equipment is needed, which can save money compared with achieving the same headway capacity using the large amount of additional equipment required by fixed or virtual block systems.

== Implementation ==
=== Urban ===
Moving block is in use on several London Underground lines, including the Jubilee, and Northern lines, and parts of the sub-surface lines. In London it is also used on the Docklands Light Railway and the core section of the Elizabeth line. New York City Subway's BMT Canarsie Line (L train), Tren Urbano (Puerto Rico), Singapore's MRT, and Vancouver's SkyTrain, also employ moving block signalling. It is also used by the Hong Kong MTR, on the Tuen Ma line, Disneyland Resort line, South Island line and the East Rail line .

=== Inter-city ===
It was supposed to be the enabling technology on the modernisation of Britain's West Coast Main Line which would allow trains to run at a higher maximum speed (140 mph or 230 km/h), but the technology was deemed not mature enough, considering the large number of junctions on the line, and the plan was dropped. Current implementations of moving block have only been effectively proven on segregated networks with few junctions. The European Rail Traffic Management System's level-3 specification (the name of which has recently changed) for the European Train Control System, aims to provide a more robust version of moving block which can work with complex railways. However, the difficulty of achieving that means the system has not yet been implemented.
