= Communications-based train control =

Railway signaling system

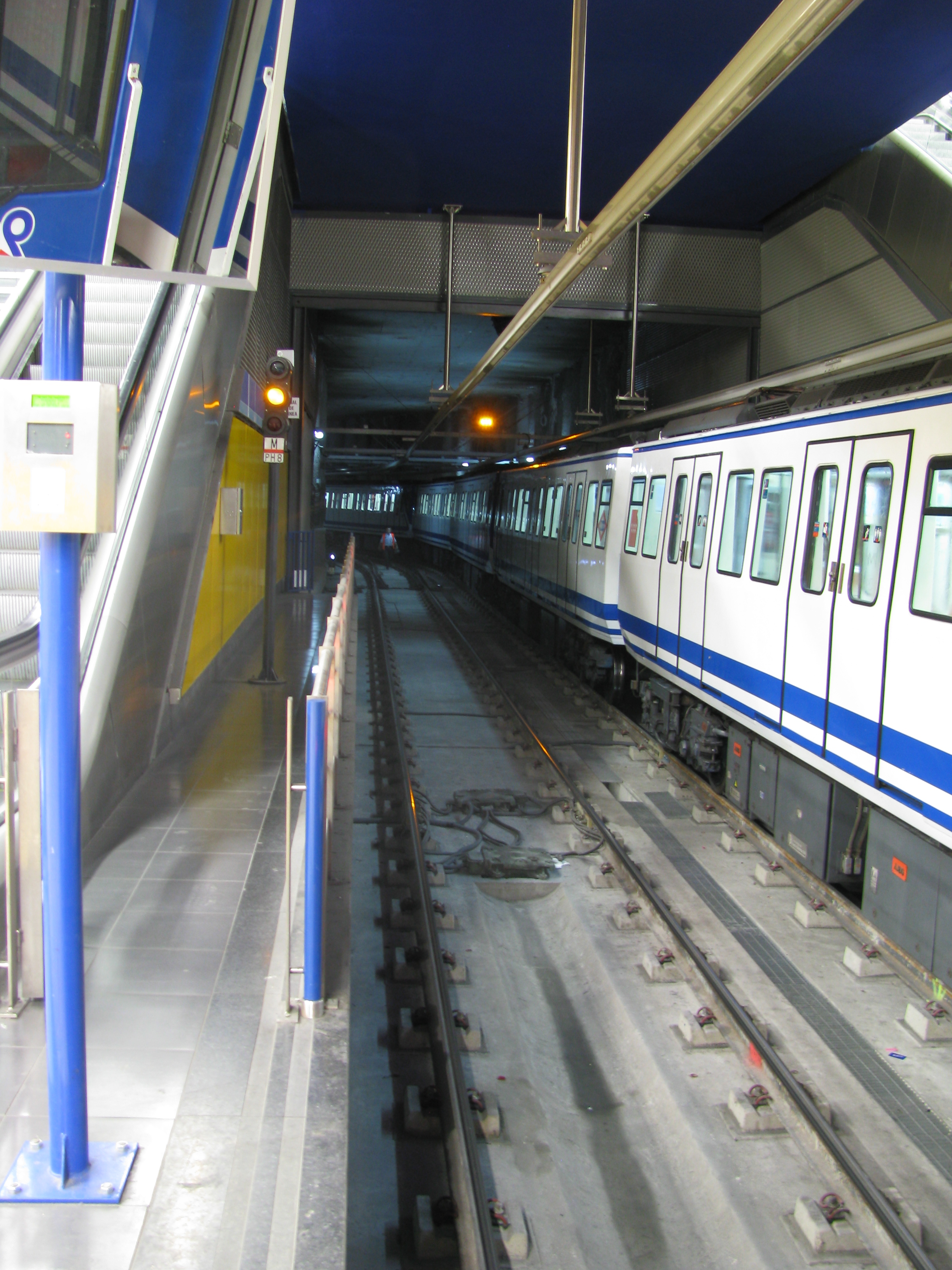
CBTC deployment in Madrid Metro, Spain

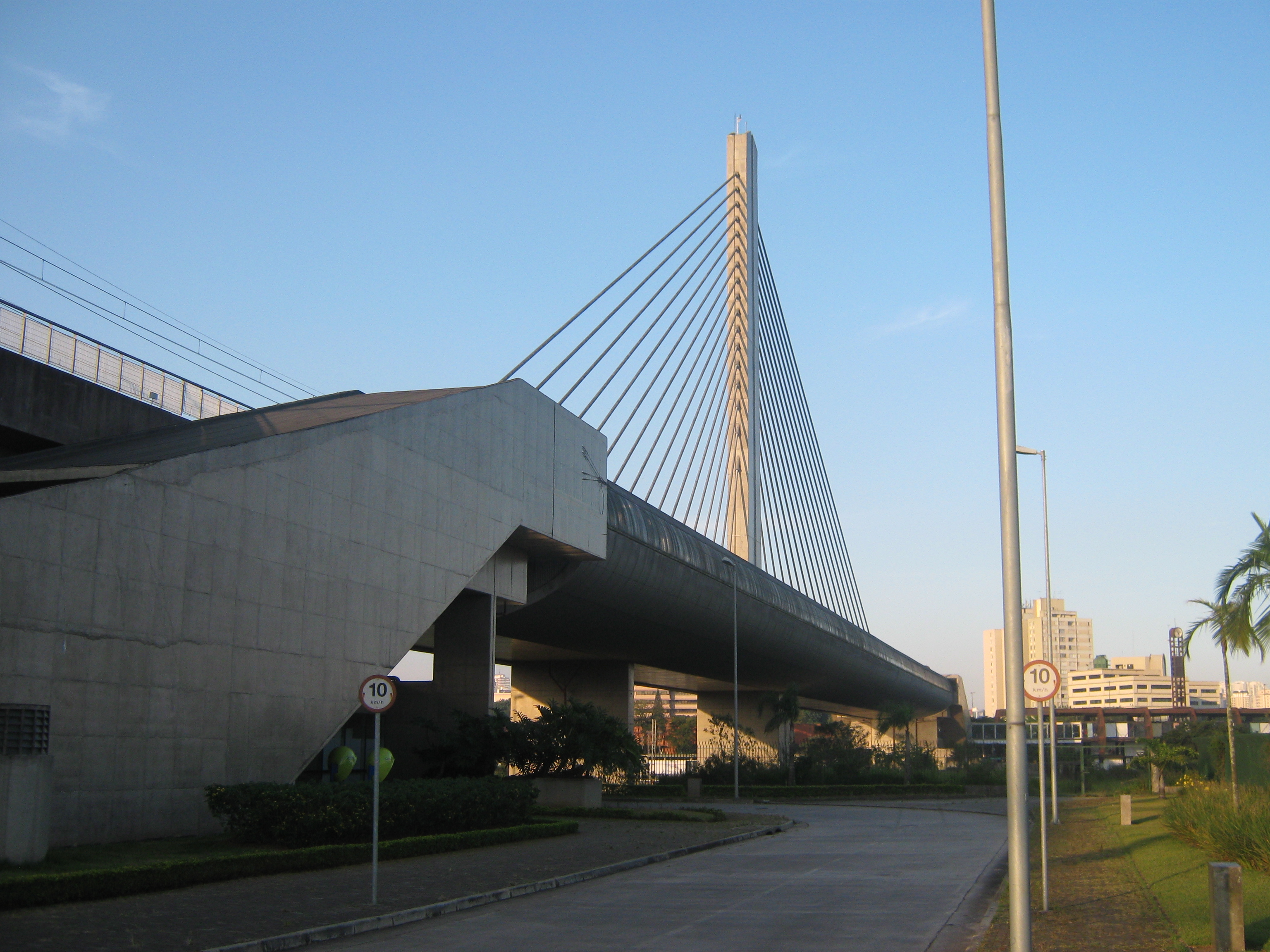
Santo Amaro station on Line 5 of the partially CBTC-enabled São Paulo Metro

Communications-based train control (CBTC) is a railway signaling system that uses telecommunications between the train and track equipment for traffic management and infrastructure control. CBTC allows a train's position to be known more accurately than with traditional signaling systems. This can make railway traffic management safer and more efficient. Rapid transit systems (and other railway systems) are able to reduce headways while maintaining or even improving safety.

A CBTC system is a "continuous, automatic train control system utilizing high-resolution train location determination, independent from track circuits; continuous, high-capacity, bidirectional train-to-wayside data communications; and trainborne and wayside processors capable of implementing automatic train protection (ATP) functions, as well as optional automatic train operation (ATO) and automatic train supervision (ATS) functions," as defined in the IEEE 1474 standard.

== Background and origin ==
CBTC is a signalling standard defined by the IEEE 1474 standard. The original version was introduced in 1999 and updated in 2004. The aim was to create consistency and standardisation between digital railway signalling systems that allow for an increase in train capacity through what the standard defines as high-resolution train location determination. The standard therefore does not require the use of moving block railway signalling, but in practice this is the most common arrangement.

=== Moving block ===
Traditional signalling systems detect trains in discrete sections of the track called "blocks", each protected by signals that prevent a train entering an occupied block. Since every block is a fixed section of track, these systems are referred to as fixed block systems.

In a moving block CBTC system the protected section for each train is a "block" that moves with and trails behind it, and provides continuous communication of the train's exact position via radio, inductive loop, etc.

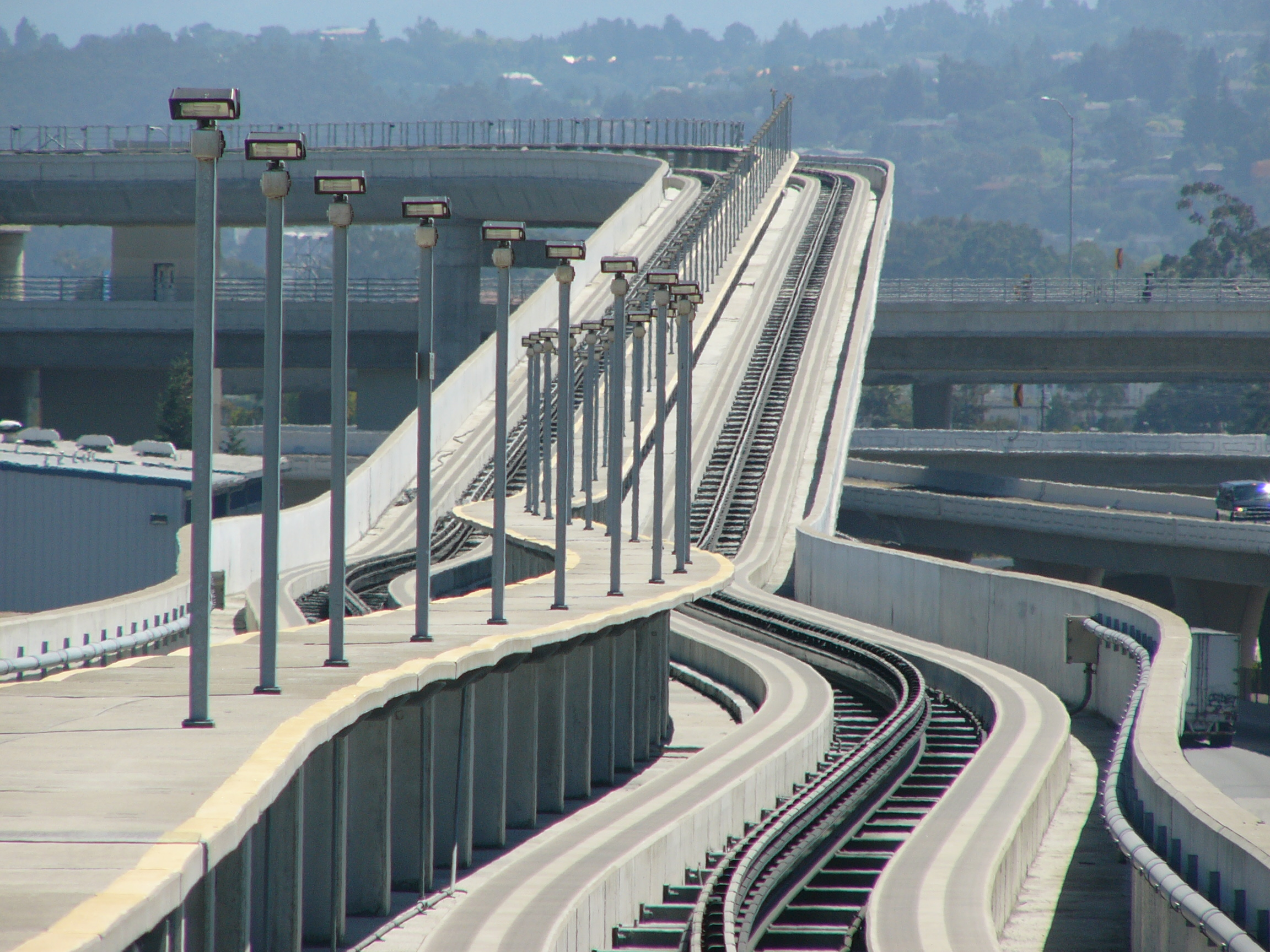
The SFO AirTrain in San Francisco Airport was the first radio-based CBTC system.

As a result, Bombardier opened the world's first radio-based CBTC system at San Francisco airport's automated people mover (APM) in February 2003. A few months later, in June 2003, Alstom introduced the railway application of its radio technology on the Singapore North East Line. CBTC has its origins in the loop-based systems developed by Alcatel SEL (later Thales, now Hitachi Rail) for the Bombardier Automated Rapid Transit (ART) systems in Canada during the mid-1980s.

These systems, which were also referred to as transmission-based train control (TBTC), made use of inductive loop transmission techniques for track to train communication, introducing an alternative to track circuit based communication. This technology, operating in the 30–60 kHz frequency range to communicate trains and wayside equipment, was widely adopted by the metro operators in spite of some electromagnetic compatibility (EMC) issues, as well as other installation and maintenance concerns (see SelTrac for further information regarding transmission-based train-control).

As with new application of any technology, some problems arose at the beginning, mainly due to compatibility and interoperability aspects. However, there have been relevant improvements since then, and currently the reliability of the radio-based communication systems has grown significantly.

Moreover, it is important to highlight that not all the systems using radio communication technology are considered to be CBTC systems. So, for clarity and to keep in line with the state-of-the-art solutions for operator's requirements, this article only covers the latest moving block principle based (either true moving block or virtual block, so not dependent on track-based detection of the trains) CBTC solutions that make use of the radio communications.

== Main features ==
=== CBTC and moving block ===
CBTC systems are modern railway signaling systems that can mainly be used in urban railway lines (either light or heavy) and APMs, although it could also be deployed on commuter lines. For main lines, a similar system might be the European Railway Traffic Management System ERTMS Level 3 (not yet fully defined). In the modern CBTC systems the trains continuously calculate and communicate their status via radio to the wayside equipment distributed along the line. This status includes, among other parameters, the exact position, speed, travel direction and braking distance.

This information allows calculation of the area potentially occupied by the train on the track. It also enables the wayside equipment to define the points on the line that must never be passed by the other trains on the same track. These points are communicated to make the trains automatically and continuously adjust their speed while maintaining the safety and comfort (jerk) requirements. So, the trains continuously receive information regarding the distance to the preceding train and are then able to adjust their safety distance accordingly.

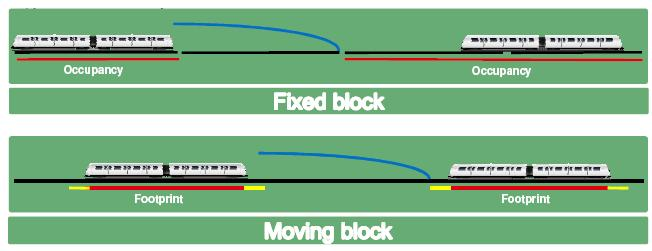
The safety distance (safe-braking distance) between trains in fixed block and moving block signalling systems

From the signalling system perspective, the first figure shows the total occupancy of the leading train by including the whole blocks which the train is located on. This is due to the fact that it is impossible for the system to know exactly where the train actually is within these blocks. Therefore, the fixed block system only allows the following train to move up to the last unoccupied block's border.

In a moving block system as shown in the second figure, the train position and its braking curve is continuously calculated by the trains, and then communicated via radio to the wayside equipment. Thus, the wayside equipment is able to establish protected areas, each one called limit of movement authority (LMA), up to the nearest obstacle (in the figure the tail of the train in front). Movement authority (MA) is the permission for a train to move to a specific location within the constraints of the infrastructure and with supervision of speed.

End of authority is the location to which the train is permitted to proceed and where target speed is equal to zero. End of movement is the location to which the train is permitted to proceed according to an MA. When transmitting an MA, it is the end of the last section given in the MA.

It is important to mention that the occupancy calculated in these systems must include a safety margin for location uncertainty (in yellow in the figure) added to the length of the train. Both of them form what is usually called footprint. This safety margin depends on the accuracy of the odometry system in the train.

CBTC systems based on moving block allows the reduction of the safety distance between two consecutive trains. This distance is varying according to the continuous updates of the train location and speed, maintaining the safety requirements. This results in a reduced headway between consecutive trains and an increased transport capacity.

=== Grades of automation ===
Modern CBTC systems allow different levels of automation or grades of automation (GoA), as defined and classified in the IEC 62290–1. In fact, CBTC is not a synonym for "driverless" or "automated trains" although it is considered as a basic enabler technology for this purpose.

There are four grades of automation available:

- GoA 0 – On-sight, with no automation
- GoA 1 – Manual, with a driver controlling all train operations.
- GoA 2 – Semi-automatic operation (STO), starting and stopping are automated, but a driver who sits in the cab operates the doors and drives in emergencies
- GoA 3 – Driverless train operation (DTO), starting and stopping are automated, but a crew member operates the doors from within the train
- GoA 4 – Unattended train operation (UTO), starting, stopping and doors are all automated, with no required crew member on board

=== Main applications ===
CBTC systems allow optimal use of the railway infrastructure as well as achieving maximum capacity and minimum headway between operating trains, while maintaining the safety requirements. These systems are suitable for the new highly demanding urban lines, but also to be overlaid on existing lines in order to improve their performance.

Of course, in the case of upgrading existing lines the design, installation, test and commissioning stages are much more critical. This is mainly due to the challenge of deploying the overlying system without disrupting the revenue service.

=== Main benefits ===
The evolution of the technology and the experience gained in operation over the last 30 years means that modern CBTC systems are more reliable and less prone to failure than older train control systems. CBTC systems normally have less wayside equipment and their diagnostic and monitoring tools have been improved, which makes them easier to implement and, more importantly, easier to maintain.

CBTC technology is evolving, making use of the latest techniques and components to offer more compact systems and simpler architectures. For instance, with the advent of modern electronics it has been possible to build in redundancy so that single failures do not adversely impact operational availability.

Moreover, these systems offer complete flexibility in terms of operational schedules or timetables, enabling urban rail operators to respond to the specific traffic demand more swiftly and efficiently and to solve traffic congestion problems. In fact, automatic operation systems have the potential to significantly reduce the headway and improve the traffic capacity compared to manual driving systems.

Finally, it is important to mention that the CBTC systems have proven to be more energy efficient than traditional manually driven systems. The use of new functionalities, such as automatic driving strategies or a better adaptation of the transport offer to the actual demand, allows significant energy savings reducing the power consumption.

=== Risks ===
The primary risk of an electronic train control system is that if the communications link between any of the trains is disrupted, all or part of the system might have to enter a failsafe state until the problem is remedied. Depending on the severity of the communication loss, this state can range from vehicles temporarily reducing speed, coming to a halt or operating in a degraded mode until communications are re-established. If communication outage is permanent, some sort of contingency operation must be implemented which may consist of manual operation using absolute block or, in the worst case, the substitution of an alternative form of transportation.

As a result, high availability of CBTC systems is crucial for proper operation, especially if such systems are used to increase transport capacity and reduce headway. System redundancy and recovery mechanisms must then be thoroughly checked to achieve a high robustness in operation. With the increased availability of the CBTC system, there is also a need for extensive training and periodical refresh of system operators on the recovery procedures. In fact, one of the major system hazards in CBTC systems is the probability of human error and improper application of recovery procedures if the system becomes unavailable.

Communications failures can result from equipment malfunction, electromagnetic interference, weak signal strength or saturation of the communications medium. In this case, an interruption can result in a service brake or emergency brake application as real time situational awareness is a critical safety requirement for CBTC and if these interruptions are frequent enough it could seriously impact service. This is the reason why, historically, CBTC systems first implemented radio communication systems in 2003, when the required technology was mature enough for critical applications.

In systems with poor line of sight or spectrum/bandwidth limitations a larger than anticipated number of transponders may be required to enhance the service. This is usually more of an issue with applying CBTC to existing transit systems in tunnels that were not designed from the outset to support it. An alternate method to improve system availability in tunnels is the use of leaky feeder cable that, while having higher initial costs (material + installation) achieves a more reliable radio link.

With the emerging services over open ISM radio bands (i.e. 2.4 GHz and 5.8 GHz) and the potential disruption over critical CBTC services, there is an increasing pressure in the international community (ref. report 676 of UITP organization, Reservation of a Frequency Spectrum for Critical Safety Applications dedicated to Urban Rail Systems) to reserve a frequency band specifically for radio-based urban rail systems. Such decision would help standardize CBTC systems across the market (a growing demand from most operators) and ensure availability for those critical systems.

As a CBTC system is required to have high availability and particularly, allow for a graceful degradation, a secondary method of signaling might be provided to ensure some level of non-degraded service upon partial or complete CBTC unavailability. This is particularly relevant for brownfield implementations (lines with an already existing signalling system) where the infrastructure design cannot be controlled and coexistence with legacy systems is required, at least, temporarily.

For example, the BMT Canarsie Line in New York City was outfitted with a backup automatic block signaling system capable of supporting 12 trains per hour (tph), compared with the 26 tph of the CBTC system. Although this is a rather common architecture for resignalling projects, it can negate some of the cost savings of CBTC if applied to new lines. This is still a key point in the CBTC development (and is still being discussed), since some providers and operators argue that a fully redundant architecture of the CBTC system may however achieve high availability values by itself.

In principle, CBTC systems may be designed with centralized supervision systems in order to improve maintainability and reduce installation costs. If so, there is an increased risk of a single point of failure that could disrupt service over an entire system or line. Fixed block systems usually work with distributed logic that are normally more resistant to such outages. Therefore, a careful analysis of the benefits and risks of a given CBTC architecture (centralized vs. distributed) must be done during system design.

When CBTC is applied to systems that previously ran under complete human control with operators working on sight it may actually result in a reduction in capacity (albeit with an increase in safety). This is because CBTC operates with less positional certainty than human sight and also with greater margins for error as worst-case train parameters are applied for the design (e.g. guaranteed emergency brake rate vs. nominal brake rate). For instance, CBTC introduction in Philly's Center City trolley tunnel resulted initially in a marked increase in travel time and corresponding decrease in capacity when compared with the unprotected manual driving. This was the offset to finally eradicate vehicle collisions which on-sight driving cannot avoid and showcases the usual conflicts between operation and safety.

== Architecture ==
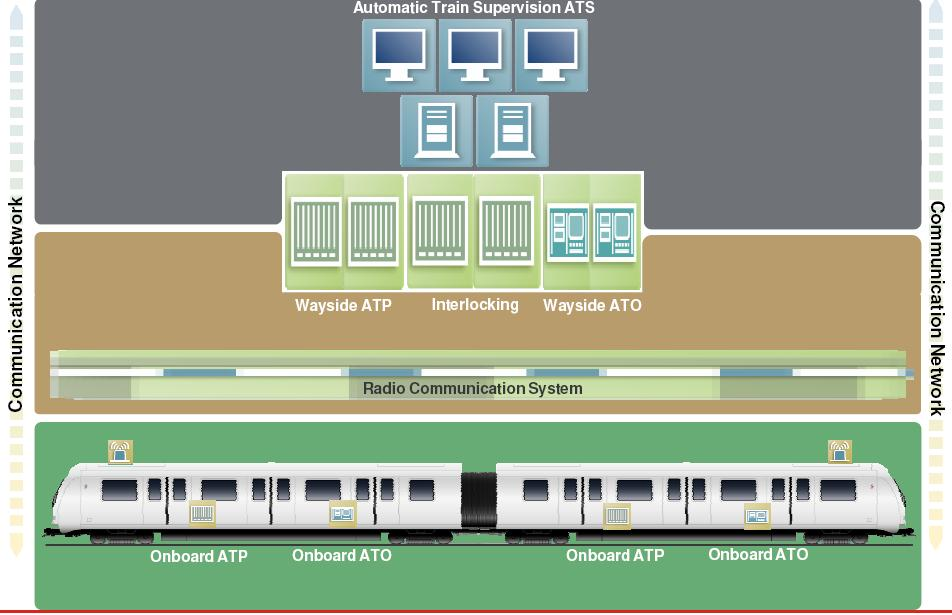
The architecture of a CBTC system

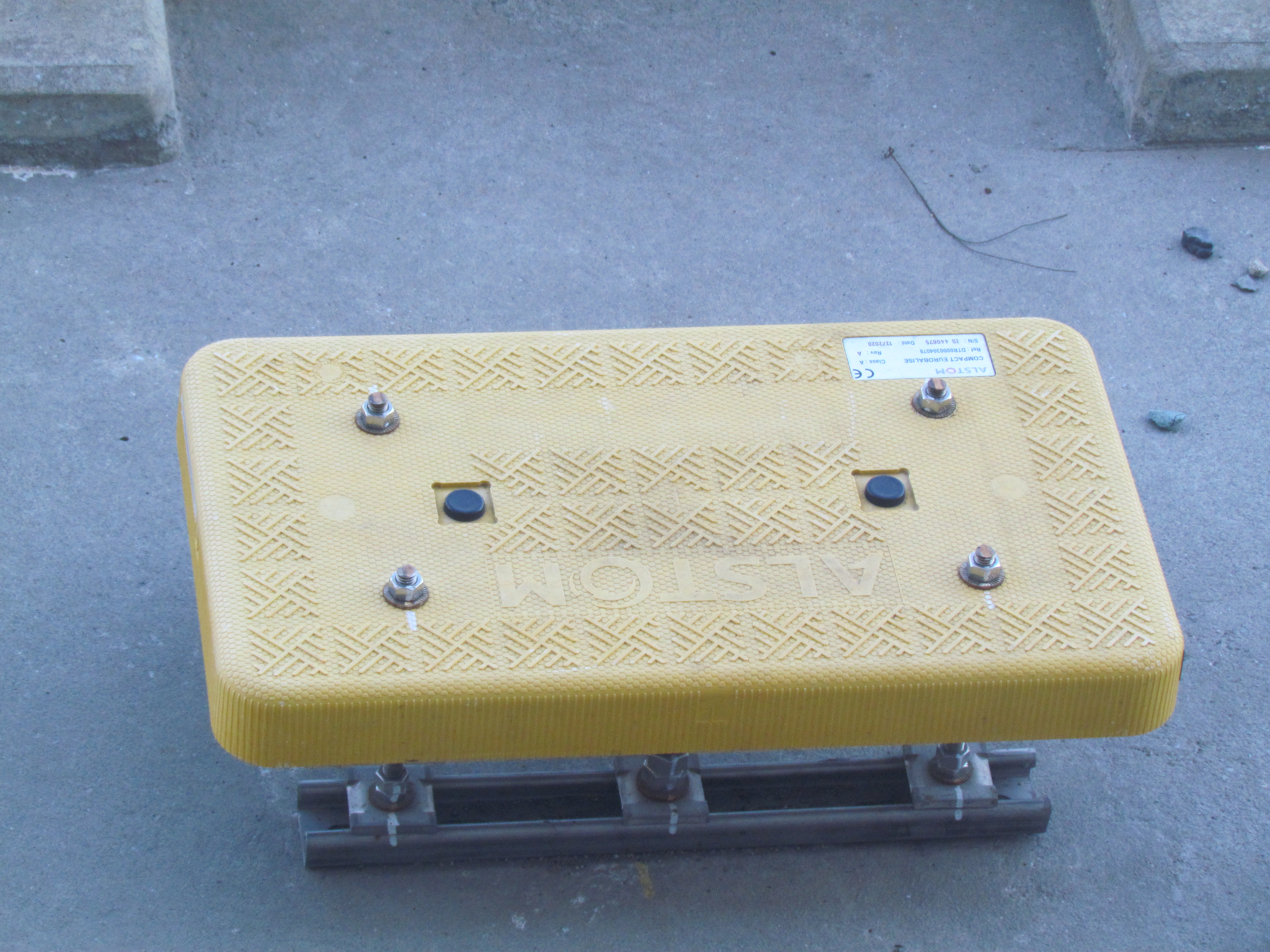
An Alstom Eurobalise on Montreal's Réseau express métropolitain

The typical architecture of a modern CBTC system comprises the following main subsystems:

1. Wayside equipment, which includes balises, interlockings and the subsystems controlling every zone in the line or network (typically containing the wayside ATP and ATO functionalities). Depending on the suppliers, the architectures may be centralized or distributed. The control of the system is performed from a central command automatic train supervision (ATS) system, though local control subsystems may be also included as a fallback.
2. CBTC onboard equipment, including ATP and ATO subsystems in the vehicles.
3. Train to wayside communication subsystem, currently based on radio links.

Thus, although a CBTC architecture is always depending on the supplier and its technical approach, the following logical components may be found generally in a typical CBTC architecture:

- Onboard ATP system. This subsystem is in charge of the continuous control of the train speed according to the safety profile, and applying the brake if it is necessary. It is also in charge of the communication with the wayside ATP subsystem in order to exchange the information needed for a safe operation (sending speed and braking distance, and receiving the limit of movement authority for a safe operation).
- Onboard ATO system. It is responsible for the automatic control of the traction and braking effort in order to keep the train under the threshold established by the ATP subsystem. Its main task is either to facilitate the driver or attendant functions, or even to operate the train in a fully automatic mode while maintaining the traffic regulation targets and passenger comfort. It also allows the selection of different automatic driving strategies to adapt the runtime or even reduce the power consumption.
- Wayside ATP system. This subsystem undertakes the management of all the communications with the trains in its area. Additionally, it calculates the limits of movement authority that every train must respect while operating in the mentioned area. This task is therefore critical for the operation safety.
- Wayside ATO system. It is in charge of controlling the destination and regulation targets of every train. The wayside ATO functionality provides all the trains in the system with their destination as well as with other data such as the dwell time in the stations. Additionally, it may also perform auxiliary and non-safety related tasks, for instance alarm/event communication and management, or handling skip/hold station commands.
- Communication system. The CBTC systems integrate a digital networked radio system by means of antennas or leaky feeder cable for the bi-directional communication between the track equipment and the trains. The 2,4GHz band is commonly used in these systems (same as WiFi), though other alternative frequencies such as 900 MHz (US), 5.8 GHz or other licensed bands may be used as well.
- ATS system. The ATS system is commonly integrated within most of the CBTC solutions. Its main task is to act as the interface between the operator and the system, managing the traffic according to the specific regulation criteria. Other tasks may include the event and alarm management as well as acting as the interface with external systems.
- Interlocking system. When needed as an independent subsystem (for instance as a fallback system), it will be in charge of the vital control of the trackside objects such as switches or signals, as well as other related functionality. In the case of simpler networks or lines, the functionality of the interlocking may be integrated into the wayside ATP system.

== Projects ==
CBTC technology has been (and is being) successfully implemented for a variety of applications as shown in the figure below (mid 2011). They range from some implementations with short track, limited numbers of vehicles and few operating modes (such as the airport APMs in Heathrow or Gatwick), to complex overlays on existing railway networks carrying more than a million passengers each day and with more than 100 trains (such as London Underground Jubilee Line and Northern Line, MTR Tuen Ma Line, Klang Valley Mass Rapid Transit, Kajang Line, and Putrajaya Line).

Despite the difficulty, the table below tries to summarize and reference the main radio-based CBTC systems deployed around the world as well as those ongoing projects being developed. Besides, the table distinguishes between the implementations performed over existing and operative systems (brownfield) and those undertaken on completely new lines (greenfield).

=== List ===
Location/system	Lines	Supplier	Solution	Commissioning	km	No. of trains	Type of field	Grade of automation	Notes
Toronto Subway	Line 3 (SRT)	Thales	SelTrac	1985	6.4	7	Greenfield	UTO	With train attendants who monitor door status, and drive trains in the event of a disruption.
Réseau express métropolitain (Montréal)	A1-4	Alstom	Urbalis 400	2023-2027	67	212	Greenfield	UTO	Initially opened in 2023, The full 67 km is projected to be opened in 2027
SkyTrain (Vancouver)	Expo Line, Millennium Line, Canada Line	Thales	SelTrac	1985	85.4	176	Greenfield	UTO	
Detroit	Detroit People Mover	Thales	SelTrac	1987	4.7	12	Greenfield	UTO	
London	Docklands Light Railway	Thales	SelTrac	1987	38	149	Greenfield	DTO	With train attendants (T\train captains) who drive trains in the event of a disruption.
San Francisco Airport	AirTrain	Bombardier	CITYFLO 650	2003	5	38	Greenfield	UTO	
Seattle-Tacoma Airport	Satellite Transit System	Bombardier	CITYFLO 650	2003	3	22	Brownfield	UTO	
Singapore MRT	North East Line	Alstom	Urbalis 300	2003	20	43	Greenfield	UTO	With train attendants (train captains) who drive trains in the event of a disruption.
Hong Kong MTR	Tuen Ma line	Thales	SelTrac	2020 (Tuen Ma Line Phase 1) 2021 (Tuen Ma Line and former West Rail Line)	57	65	Greenfield (Tai Wai to Hung Hom section only) Brownfield (other sections)	STO	Existing sections were upgraded from SelTrac IS
Hong Kong MTR	Disneyland Resort line	Thales	SelTrac	2005	3	3	Greenfield	UTO	
Las Vegas	Monorail	Thales	SelTrac	2004	6	36	Greenfield	UTO	
Dallas–Fort Worth Airport	Skylink	Bombardier	CITYFLO 650	2005	10	64	Greenfield	UTO	
Lausanne Metro	Line M2	Alstom	Urbalis 300	2008	6	18	Greenfield	UTO	
London Heathrow Airport	Heathrow APM	Bombardier	CITYFLO 650	2008	1	9	Greenfield	UTO	
Madrid Metro	,	Bombardier	CITYFLO 650	2008	48	143	Brownfield	STO	
McCarran Airport	McCarran Airport APM	Bombardier	CITYFLO 650	2008	2	10	Brownfield	UTO	
Bangkok BTS Skytrain	Silom Line, Sukhumvit Line	Bombardier	CITYFLO 450	2009 (Mo Chit - On Nut & National Stadium - Wongwian Yai sections) 2011 (On Nut extension) 2015 (Samrong extension) 2018 (Kheha extension) 2019 (Khu Khot extension)	64.26	98	Brownfield (Mo Chit to On Nut and National Stadium to Saphan Taksin sections) Greenfield (other sections)	STO	Upgraded from Siemens Trainguard LZB700M CTC in 2009.
Bangkok BTS Skytrain	Gold Line	Bombardier	CITYFLO 650	2020	1.7	3	Greenfield	UTO	
Bangkok MRT	Purple Line	Bombardier	CITYFLO 650	2015	23	21	Greenfield	STO	With train attendants who drive trains in the event of a disruption. These train attendants are on standby in the train.
Bangkok MRT	Pink, Yellow	Bombardier	CITYFLO 650	2021	62.52	58	Greenfield	UTO	
Barcelona Metro	,,	Siemens	Trainguard MT CBTC	2009 (Line 9, Line 11) 2010 (Line 10)	46	50	Greenfield	UTO	
New York City Subway	BMT Canarsie Line, IRT Flushing Line	Siemens	Trainguard MT CBTC	2009	17	69 (Note: This is the number of four-car train sets available. The BMT Canarsie Line runs trains with eight cars.)	Brownfield	STO	
Singapore MRT	Circle Line	Alstom	Urbalis 300	2009	35	64	Greenfield	UTO	With train attendants (Rovers) who drive trains in the event of a disruption. These train attendants are also on standby between Botanic Gardens and Caldecott stations.
Taipei Metro	Neihu-Mucha	Bombardier	CITYFLO 650	2009	26	76	Greenfield and Brownfield	UTO	
Washington-Dulles Airport	Dulles APM	Thales	SelTrac	2009	8	29	Greenfield	UTO	
São Paulo Metro	1, 2, 3	Alstom	Urbalis	2010	62	142	Greenfield and Brownfield	UTO	CBTC operates in Lines 1 and 2 and it is being installed in Line 3
São Paulo Metro	4	Siemens	Trainguard MT CBTC	2010	13	29	Greenfield	UTO	First UTO line in Latin America
London Underground	Jubilee line	Thales	SelTrac	2010	37	63	Brownfield	STO	
London Gatwick Airport	Shuttle Transit APM	Bombardier	CITYFLO 650	2010	1	6	Brownfield	UTO	
Milan Metro	1	Alstom	Urbalis	2010	27	68	Brownfield	STO	
Philadelphia SEPTA	SEPTA subway–surface trolley lines	Bombardier	CITYFLO 650	2010	8	115		STO	
B&G Metro	Busan-Gimhae Light Rail Transit	Thales	SelTrac	2011	23.5	25	Greenfield	UTO	
Dubai Metro	Red, Green	Thales	SelTrac	2011	70	85	Greenfield	UTO	
Madrid Metro	Extension MetroEste	Invensys	Sirius	2011	9	?	Brownfield	STO	
Paris Métro	1	Siemens	Trainguard MT CBTC	2011	16	53	Brownfield	DTO	
Sacramento International Airport	Sacramento APM	Bombardier	CITYFLO 650	2011	1	2	Greenfield	UTO	
Yongin	EverLine	Bombardier	CITYFLO 650	2011	19	30		UTO	
Algiers Metro	1	Siemens	Trainguard MT CBTC	2012	9	14	Greenfield	STO	
Istanbul Metro	M4	Thales	SelTrac	2012	21.7		Greenfield		
Istanbul Metro	M5	Bombardier	CityFLO 650	2017-2018	16.9	21	Greenfield	UTO	Opened in 2 phases the first in 2017 and the second in 2018
Ankara Metro	M1	Ansaldo STS	CBTC	2018	14.6		Brownfield	STO	
Ankara Metro	M2	Ansaldo STS	CBTC	2014	16.5		Greenfield	STO	
Ankara Metro	M3	Ansaldo STS	CBTC	2014	15.5		Greenfield	STO	
Ankara Metro	M4	Ansaldo STS	CBTC	2017	9.2		Greenfield	STO	
Mexico City Metro	Mexico City Metro Line 12	Alstom	Urbalis	2012	25	30	Greenfield	STO	
Mexico City Metro	Mexico City Metro Line 1	Siemens	Trainguard MT CBTC	2022-2024	18	39	Brownfield	DTO	
New York City Subway	IND Culver Line	Thales & Siemens	Various	2012			Greenfield		A test track was retrofitted in 2012; the line's other tracks will be retrofitted by the early 2020s.
Phoenix Sky Harbor Airport	PHX Sky Train	Bombardier	CITYFLO 650	2012	3	18	Greenfield	UTO	
Riyadh	KAFD Monorail	Bombardier	CITYFLO 650	2012	4	12	Greenfield	UTO	
São Paulo Commuter Lines	8, 10, 11	Invensys	Sirius	2012	107	136	Brownfield	UTO	
Caracas Metro	1	Invensys	Sirius	2013	21	48	Brownfield		
Málaga Metro	,	Alstom	Urbalis	2013	17	15	Greenfield	ATO	
Paris Métro	3, 5	Ansaldo STS / Siemens	Inside RATP's; Ouragan project	2010, 2013	26	40	Brownfield	STO	
Paris Métro	13	Thales	SelTrac	2010, 2013	23	66	Brownfield	STO	
Toronto subway	1	Alstom	Urbalis 400	2017 to 2022	76.78	65	Brownfield (Finch to Sheppard West); Greenfield (Sheppard West to Vaughan)	STO	CBTC active between Vaughan Metropolitan Centre and Eglinton stations as of October 2021. The entire line is scheduled to be fully upgraded by 2022.
Singapore MRT	Downtown Line	Invensys	Sirius	2013	42	92	Greenfield	UTO	With train attendants who drive trains in the event of a disruption.
Budapest Metro	M2, M4	Siemens	Trainguard MT CBTC	2013 (M2); 2014 (M4)	17	41		Line M2: STO Line M4: UTO	
Dubai Metro	Al Sufouh LRT	Alstom	Urbalis	2014	10	11	Greenfield	STO	
Edmonton LRT	Capital Line, Metro Line	Thales	SelTrac	2014	24 double track	94	Brownfield	DTO	
Helsinki Metro	1	Siemens	Trainguard MT CBTC	2014	35	45.5	Greenfield and Brownfield	STO	
Hong Kong International Airport	Hong Kong International Airport Automated People Mover	Thales	SelTrac	2014	4	14	Brownfield	UTO	
Incheon Subway	2	Thales	SelTrac	2014	29	37	Greenfield	UTO	
Jeddah Airport	King Abdulaziz APM	Bombardier	CITYFLO 650	2014	2	6	Greenfield	UTO	
London Underground	Northern line	Thales	SelTrac	2014	58	106	Brownfield	STO	
Salvador Metro	4	Thales	SelTrac	2014	33	29	Greenfield	DTO	
Massachusetts Bay Transportation Authority	Mattapan Line	Argenia	SafeNet CBTC	2014	6	12	Greenfield	STO	
Munich Airport	Munich Airport T2 APM	Bombardier	CITYFLO 650	2014	1	12	Greenfield	UTO	
Shinbundang Line	Dx Line	Thales	SelTrac	2014	30.5	12	Greenfield	UTO	
Panama Metro	1	Alstom	Urbalis	2014	13.7	17	Greenfield	ATO	
São Paulo Metro	15	Bombardier	CITYFLO 650	2014	14	27	Greenfield	UTO	
Amsterdam Metro	50, 51, 52, 53, 54	Alstom	Urbalis	2015	62	85	Greenfield and Brownfield	STO	
Delhi Metro	Line 7, Line 9	Bombardier	CITYFLO 650	2018 (Temp. Driver on Board) 2021 (Full ATO Operations) 2024 (transitioning to UTO)	55				
São Paulo Metro	5	Bombardier	CITYFLO 650	2015	20	34	Brownfield & Greenfield	UTO	
Buenos Aires Underground	Line H (Buenos Aires Underground)	Siemens	Trainguard MT CBTC	2016	8	20	?	?	
Buenos Aires Underground	Line C (Buenos Aires Underground)	Siemens	Trainguard MT CBTC	2016	4.5	18	?	?	
Hong Kong MTR	South Island line	Alstom	Urbalis 400	2016	7	10	Greenfield	UTO	
Hyderabad Metro	L1, L2, L3	Thales	SelTrac	2016	72	57	Greenfield	STO	
Kochi Metro	L1	Alstom	Urbalis 400	2016	26	25	Greenfield	ATO	
New York City Subway	IRT Flushing Line	Thales	SelTrac	2016	17	46 (Note: This is the number of eleven-car train sets available. The IRT Flushing Line runs trains with eleven cars, though they are not all linked together; they are arranged in five- and six-car sets.)	Brownfield and Greenfield	STO	
New York City Subway	IND Queens Boulevard Line	Siemens/Thales	Trainguard MT CBTC	2017–2022 (Note: Work being done in phases; the main phase between 50th Street and Kew Gardens–Union Turnpike stations was completed in 2022)	21.9 (Note: Includes a 1.48 km "express bypass" where non-stopping express trains take a different route than stopping local trains.)	309 (Note: This is the number of four- and five- car sets to be equipped with CBTC; they will be linked up in sets of 8 or 10 cars each. The routes that use the Queens Boulevard and Crosstown lines are serviced by trains from Jamaica Yard and East New York Yard.)	Brownfield	ATO	Train conductors will be located aboard the train because other parts of the routes using the Queens Boulevard Line will not be equipped with CBTC.
Kuala Lumpur Metro (LRT)	Line 5, Kelana Jaya Line	Thales	SelTrac	2016	91.5	126	Brownfield	UTO	
Metro Santiago	Santiago Metro Line 1	Alstom	Urbalis	2016	20	42	Greenfield and Brownfield	DTO	
Walt Disney World	Walt Disney World Monorail System	Thales	SelTrac	2016	22	15	Brownfield	UTO	
Delhi Metro	Line-8	Nippon Signal	SPARCS	2017 (Temp. Driver on Board) 2021 (Full ATO Operations)			Greenfield	UTO	
Lille Metro	1	Alstom	Urbalis	2017	15	27	Brownfield	UTO	
Lucknow Metro	L1	Alstom	Urbalis	2017	23	20	Greenfield	ATO	
Metro Santiago	Santiago Metro Line 6	Thales	SelTrac	2017	15.4	15	Greenfield	UTO	
Stockholm Metro	Red line	Ansaldo STS	CBTC	2017	41	30	Brownfield	STO->UTO	
Singapore MRT	North–South Line	Thales	SelTrac	2017	45.3	198	Brownfield	UTO	With train attendants (train captains) who drive trains in the event of a disruption. These train attendants are on standby in the train.
Singapore MRT	East–West Line	Thales	SelTrac	2018	57.2	198	Brownfield (original line); Greenfield (Tuas West Extension only)	UTO	With train attendants who drive trains in the event of a disruption. These train attendants are on standby in the train.
Copenhagen S-Train	All lines	Siemens	Trainguard MT CBTC	2021	170	136	Brownfield	STO	
Doha Metro	L1	Thales	SelTrac	2018	33	35	Greenfield	ATO	
New York City Subway	IND Eighth Avenue Line	Siemens/Thales	Trainguard MT CBTC	2018–2024 (Note: Work being done in phases; the first phase is between 59th and High Street stations.)	9.3		Brownfield	ATO	Train conductors will be located aboard the train because other parts of the routes using the Eighth Avenue Line will not be equipped with CBTC.
O-Train	Line 1 (O-Train)	Thales	SelTrac	2018	12.5	34	Greenfield	STO	
Port Authority Trans-Hudson (PATH)	All lines	Siemens	Trainguard MT CBTC	2018	22.2	50	Brownfield	ATO	
Rennes ART	B	Siemens	Trainguard MT CBTC	2018	12	19	Greenfield	UTO	
Riyadh Metro	L4, L5 and L6	Alstom	Urbalis	2018	64	69	Greenfield	ATO	
Sosawonsi Co. (Gyeonggi-do)	Seohae Line	Siemens	Trainguard MT CBTC	2018	23.3	7	Greenfield	ATO	
Buenos Aires Underground	Line D (Buenos Aires Underground)	TBD	TBD	2019	11	26	TBD	TBD	
Gimpo	Gimpo Goldline	Nippon Signal	SPARCS	2019	23.63	23	Greenfield	UTO	
Jakarta MRT	North–south line	Nippon Signal	SPARCS	2019	20.1	16	Greenfield	STO	
Panama Metro	2	Alstom	Urbalis	2019	21	21	Greenfield	ATO	
Metro Santiago	Santiago Metro Line 3	Thales	SelTrac	2019	21.7	22	Greenfield	UTO	
Sydney Metro	Metro North West & Bankstown Line	Alstom	Urbalis 400	2019	37	22	Brownfield	UTO	
Singapore MRT	Thomson–East Coast Line	Alstom	Urbalis 400	2020	43	91	Greenfield	UTO	
Suvarnabhumi Airport APM	MNTB to SAT-1	Siemens	Trainguard MT CBTC	2020	1	6	Greenfield	UTO	
Bucharest Metro	Line M5	Alstom	Urbalis 400	2020	6.9	13		STO	To be fully operational after the delivery of the 13 Alstom Metropolis BM4 trains.
Bay Area Rapid Transit	Red Line, Orange Line, Yellow Line, Green Line, Blue Line	Hitachi Rail STS	CBTC	2030		211.5	Brownfield	STO	
Lahore	Orange Line	Alstom-Casco	Urabliss888	2020	27	27 (CRRC)	Greenfield	ATO	
Hong Kong MTR	East Rail line	Siemens	Trainguard MT CBTC	2021	41.5	37	Brownfield	STO	
Lisbon Metro	Blue Line, Yellow Line, Green Line	Siemens	Trainguard MT CBTC	2021-2027	33.7	84	Brownfield	STO	
Baselland Transport (BLT)	Line 19 Waldenburgerbahn	Stadler	NOVA Pro CBTC	2022	13.2	10	Greenfield	STO	
São Paulo Metro	17	Thales	SelTrac	2022	17.7	24	Greenfield	UTO	Under construction
Melbourne	Cranbourne line, Pakenham line, Sunbury line, Metro Tunnel	Bombardier	CITYFLO 650	2023	115.8	70	Brownfield	STO	CBTC only available between West Footscray and Clayton stations
São Paulo Metro	Line 6	Nippon Signal	SPARCS	2023	15	24	Greenfield	UTO	Under construction
Tokyo	Tokyo Metro Marunouchi Line	Mitsubishi	?	2023	27.4	53	Brownfield	?	
Tokyo	Tokyo Metro Hibiya Line	?	?	2023	20.3	42	Brownfield	?	
Seoul	Sillim Line	LS ELECTRIC	LTran-CX	2023	7.8	?	?	?	
JR West	Wakayama Line	?	?	2023	42.5	?	Brownfield	?	
Kuala Lumpur Metro (LRT)	Line 11, Shah Alam Line	Thales	SelTrac	2024	36	25	Brownfield	UTO	
Marmaray Lines	Commuter Lines	Invensys	Sirius	?	77	?	Greenfield	STO	
Hong Kong MTR	Kwun Tong line, Tsuen Wan line, Island line, Tseung Kwan O line	Alstom-Hitachi Rail (formerly Thales)	Advanced SelTrac	2026-2029	58.1	128	Brownfield	STO & DTO	
New York City Subway	IND Crosstown Line	Hitachi Rail (formerly Thales)	SelTrac	2029	16	309	Brownfield	STO	
Porto Metro	Porto Metro	Alstom	Cityflo 250	2024	3.0	18	Greenfield	STO	
Ahmedabad	MEGA	Nippon Signal	SPARCS	?	39.259	96 coaches (rolling stock)	?	?	
Baltimore	Baltimore Metro SubwayLink	Hitachi Rail STS	CBTC	2025	24.8	78 (Note: Total number of railcars ordered, service is typically operated using four-car trains.)	Brownfield	STO	New railcars and signalling system undergoing testing, expected to enter service in mid-2025
Transport for London	Elizabeth line	Siemens	Trainguard MT CBTC	2022	42	70	Brownfield	STO	Paddington to Abbey Wood / Stratford
Jabodebek LRT	Bekasi Line, Cibubur Line	Siemens	Trainguard MT CBTC	2023	44.4	31	Greenfield	DTO	
Oslo Metro	All lines	Siemens	Trainguard MT CBTC	2025-2030	85	115	Greenfield (Fornebu Line); Brownfield (other lines)	STO	Being gradually rolled out throughout the system, first commissioned between Brattlikollen and Lambertseter on Lambertseter Line.
Atlanta MARTA	All lines	Stadler	NOVA Pro CBTC	2024	77	354	Brownfield	STO	
Hartsfield–Jackson Atlanta International Airport	The Plane Train	Alstom	?	2024	4.5	63	Brownfield	UTO	

== Notes and references ==
=== Further reading ===
- Wang, Chunjun (2026). Communications-Based Train Control, Volume 1: Foundations & Technical Architecture. Princeton, NJ: Independent. ISBN 979-8-258-54295-3.
- Wang, Chunjun (2026). Communications-Based Train Control, Volume 2: Operations, Deployment & Economics. Princeton, NJ: Independent. ISBN 979-8-258-54528-2.
- Argenia Railway Technologies SafeNet CBTC
- Thales SelTrac(R) CBTC
