= Recovery procedure =

Process that attempts to bring a system back to a normal operating state

In telecommunications, a recovery procedure is a process that attempts to bring a system back to a normal operating state. Examples:

1. The actions necessary to restore an automated information system's data files and computational capability after a system failure.
2. In data communications, a process whereby a data station attempts to resolve conflicting or erroneous conditions arising during the data transfer.

== See also ==
- Error detection and correction
- Fault-tolerant design
- Fault-tolerant system
