= Transmission-based train control =

Railway signaling technology

Transmission-based train control (TBTC) is a communication technology protocol used in railway signaling. It encapsulates all railway signaling methodologies or frameworks that rely on the communication between the control room, trackside systems and onboard systems to ensure safe train movements.

== Background ==
Transmission-based train control (TBTC) uses induction loop technology to facilitate communication between onboard systems and trackside systems.

== Types of transmission-based train control ==
=== Positive train control ===
Positive Train control is a type of automatic train protection system that prevents train-to-train collision, over speeding and unauthorized train movements. It used GPS technology and wireless radio to calculate safe distances between trains to transmit movement authority from the onboard controllers on the following train, to the wayside controllers to prevent collision with the leading train. Positive Train Control calculates train stopping distances and prompts locomotive engineers to slow down based on each train’s weight, length, speed and track terrain. The sophisticated safety system automatically stops trains if engineers do not respond in a timely manner, preventing certain accidents caused by human error including train-to-train collisions.

=== Communication-based train control ===
According to the IEEE 1474 (1999), communications-based train control (CBTC) is a continuous, automatic train control system utilizing high-resolution train location determination, independent of track circuits and continuous communication between train onboard systems and wayside systems. They rely on Wi-Fi or LTE radio technology to establish this bi-directional communication between the train and wayside controllers.
