= Relief Line (Toronto) =

Former proposed rapid transit line in Toronto, Ontario

Overview
- Status: Cancelled
- Locale: Toronto, Ontario
- Termini: Pape, Osgoode
- Stations: 8
- Website: reliefline.ca

Service
- Type: Rapid transit
- System: Toronto subway
- Operator: Toronto Transit Commission

The Relief Line (formerly the Downtown Relief Line or DRL) was a proposed rapid transit line for the Toronto subway system, intended to provide capacity relief to the Yonge segment of Line 1 and Bloor–Yonge station and extend subway service coverage in the city's east end. Several plans for an east–west downtown subway line date back to the early 20th century, most of which ran along Queen Street.

Since the early 21st century, studies proposed a line that would run south from Line 2 Bloor–Danforth at a point east of the Don River, before bending westward along Queen Street into Downtown Toronto. The Relief Line was included in the regional transportation plan The Big Move and is one of Metrolinx's top 15 transit priorities. In August 2018, an alignment was approved by the Ontario Ministry of Environment, Conservation, and Parks.

In April 2019, the Government of Ontario announced that the Ontario Line, a provincially funded, automated rapid transit line running from Exhibition Place to Science Centre station, would be built instead of the Relief Line. Thus, in June 2019, TTC and City staff suspended further planning work on the Relief Line. In October 2019, Toronto City Council voted 22 to 3 to support the Ontario Line plan in place of the Relief Line, effectively cancelling it.

== Purpose ==
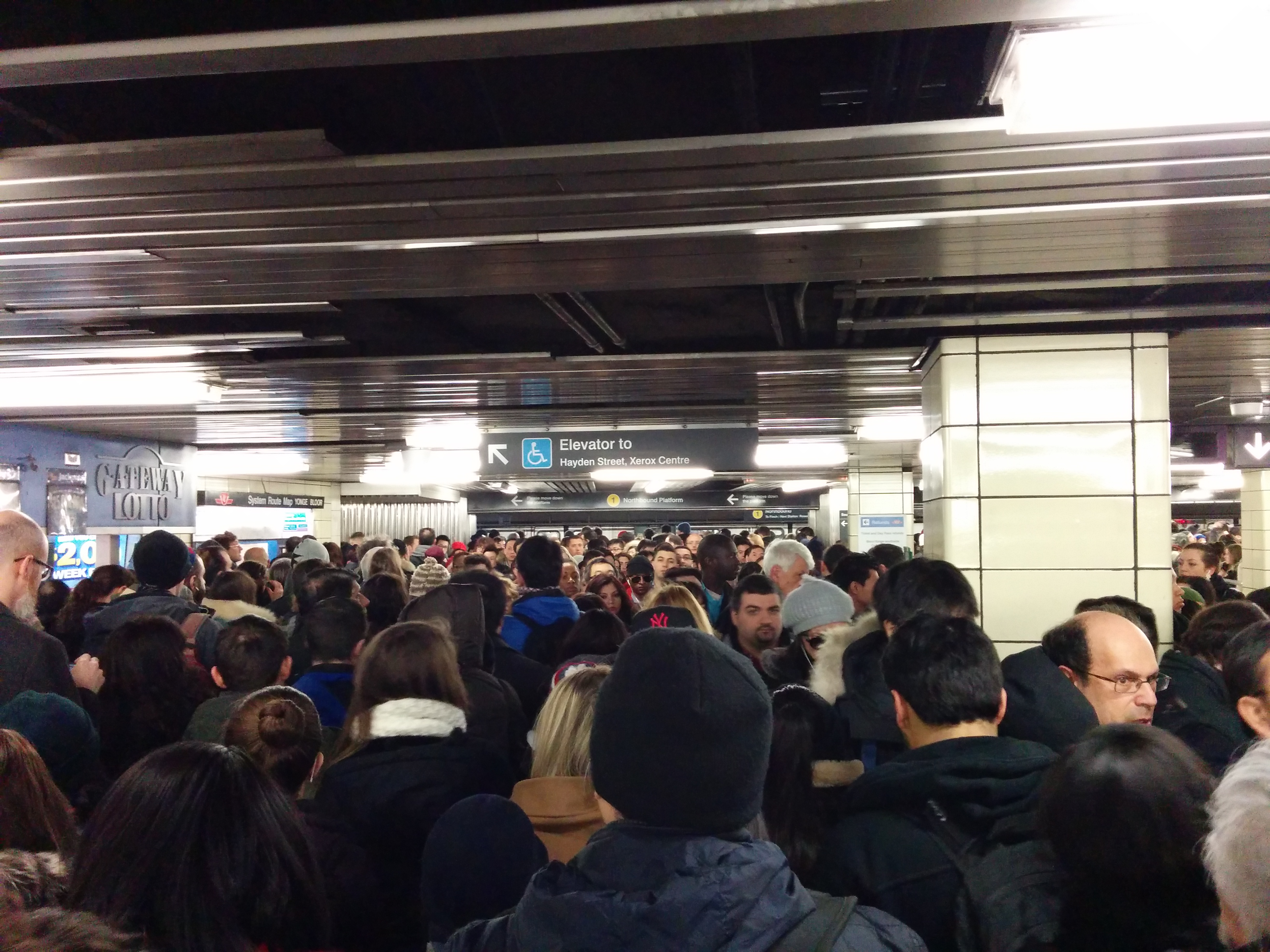
Bloor–Yonge station during a service disruption on Line 1 Yonge–University in 2015

The purpose of the Relief Line is to help reduce current and projected congestion in downtown Toronto. In 2012, it was becoming apparent to the Toronto Transit Commission (TTC) and Metrolinx that even with proposed improvements, Line 1 Yonge–University – and particularly Bloor–Yonge station, the main interchange with Line 2 Bloor–Danforth – were facing significant capacity constraints. In 2011, Line 1 was officially over capacity between St. Clair and College stations. After fully converting the line's fleet to higher-capacity Toronto Rocket trains, the section between St. Clair and Bloor–Yonge stations was no longer officially over capacity. However, by 2015, Line 1 still operated 11 percent over its capacity south of Line 2 during the morning rush hour. The future implementation of automatic train control will help further increase the capacity of Line 1 to 33,000 people per hour per direction. Other factors are expected to reduce demand such as the extension of the University portion of Line 1 into Vaughan and other local transit improvements. However, after factoring in population and employment growth and the proposed extension of Line 1 north into Richmond Hill, Metrolinx projects it will be at 96 percent of its capacity by 2031 even with committed improvements. The Relief Line will provide an alternate route for commuters heading downtown by allowing them to bypass the most congested segment of Line 1 and avoid transferring at Bloor–Yonge station.

Significant growth is also planned adjacent to the downtown core and throughout the Greater Toronto Area. Population and employment in Toronto's downtown core are projected to increase by 83 percent and 28 percent, respectively, by 2031. This is expected to increase future transit demand into the downtown core by 55 percent. On top of the projected congestion on Line 1 and at Bloor–Yonge station, the increase in the downtown population will put pressure on the congested 504 King and 501 Queen streetcars (two of the TTC's busiest surface transit routes). Metrolinx in a separate report projects that with the implementation of GO Transit's GO Expansion (formerly known as Regional Express Rail service), passenger traffic at Union Station will double or triple 2005 volumes by 2031. This could lead to a significant capacity shortfall for Union Station beyond 2031, potentially requiring a modified Relief Line with connections to auxiliary GO Transit stations to "offload" demand at Union Station.

== Route ==
The proposed route as of April 2017 was to have the line begin at Pape station on Line 2 Bloor–Danforth, heading south under Pape Avenue, then veering west between Riverdale Avenue and Gerrard Street. It would continue south under Carlaw Avenue to south of Queen Street East. The line would then curve westward, running approximately along Eastern Avenue to Sumach Street and King Street East, where the line would veer northwest until about Parliament Street and Queen Street. The line would then have continued westward under Queen Street to terminate at University Avenue.

== Stations ==
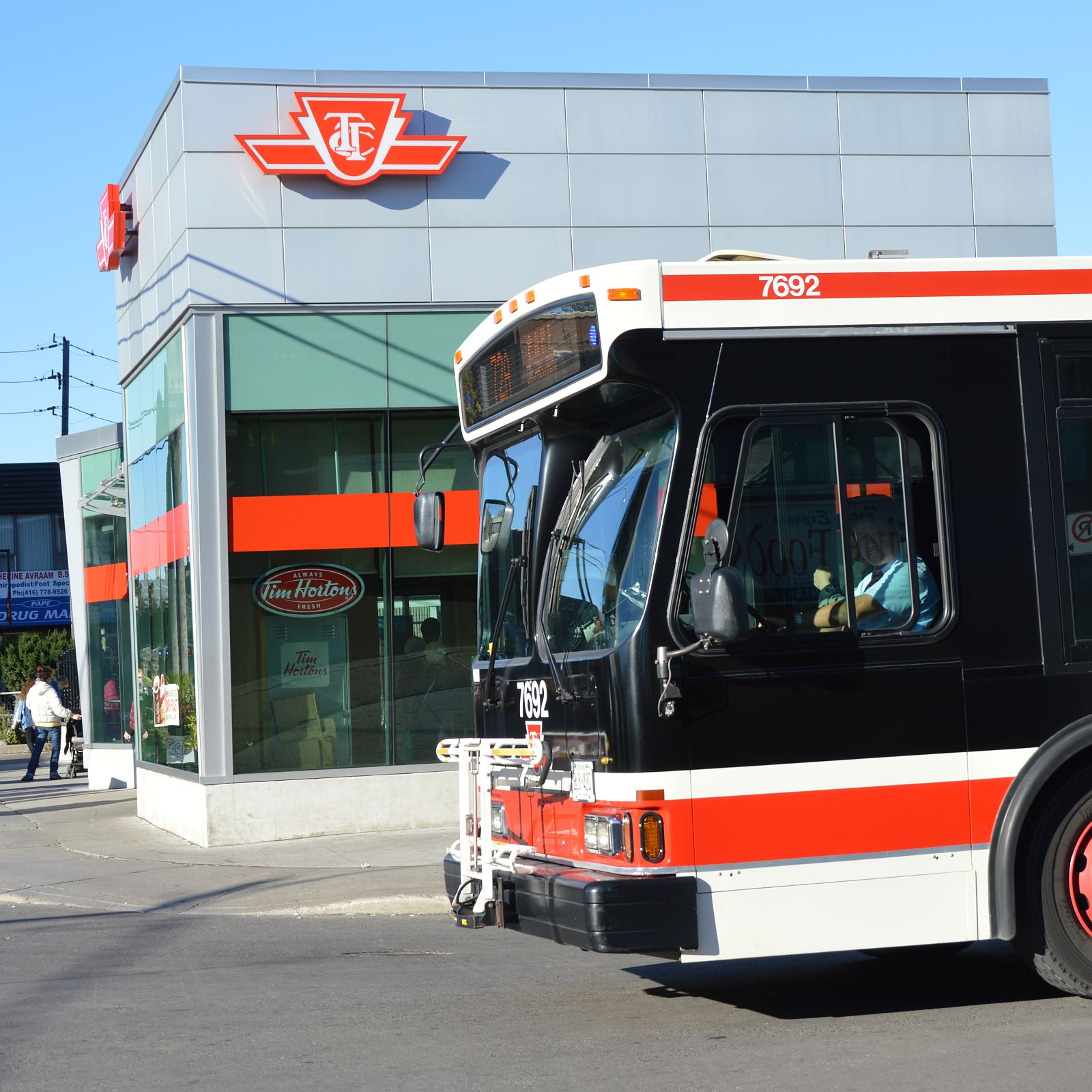
Pape station would have been the northern terminus of the Relief Line.

Stations along the first phase (Relief Line South), from the existing Osgoode station to the existing Pape station, would be:

- Osgoode station at Queen Street and University Avenue with connection to the University segment of Line 1 Yonge–University, serving Queen West.
- Queen station, an existing station at Queen Street and Yonge Street with connection to the Yonge segment of Line 1 Yonge–University and Toronto Eaton Centre.
- Sherbourne station (not to be confused with the station of the same name on Line 2 Bloor–Danforth) at Sherbourne Street and Queen Street East, serving the Regent Park and Moss Park neighbourhoods.
- Sumach station, at Sumach Street and King Street East, with connections to the 504 King streetcar, serving the Corktown neighbourhood.
- Broadview station (not to be confused with the station of the same name on Line 2 Bloor–Danforth), at Broadview Avenue and Eastern Avenue, connecting to a proposed East Harbour GO station along the Lakeshore East and Stouffville GO rail corridors.
- Carlaw station, north side of Queen Street East at Carlaw Avenue, with connection to the 501 Queen streetcar.
- Gerrard station, north side of Gerrard Street between Pape Avenue and Carlaw Avenue, with connections to the 506 Carlton streetcar and possibly the 505 Dundas streetcar and also to a proposed GO station along the Lakeshore East and Stouffville GO rail corridors.
- Pape station one block north of Danforth Avenue with connection to Line 2 Bloor–Danforth.

== History ==
=== 1910–1944: The underground streetcar ===
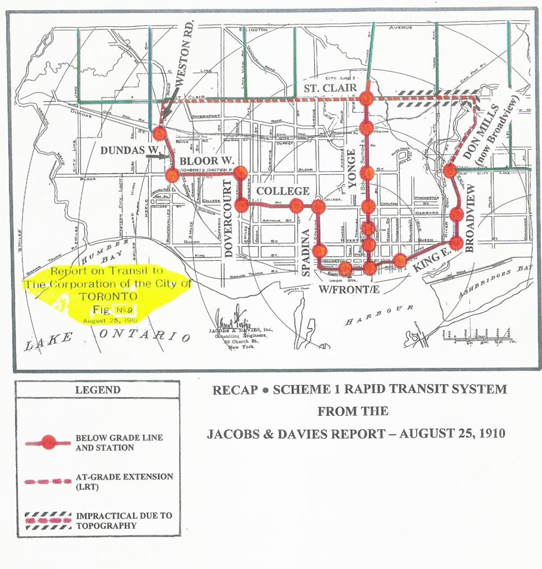
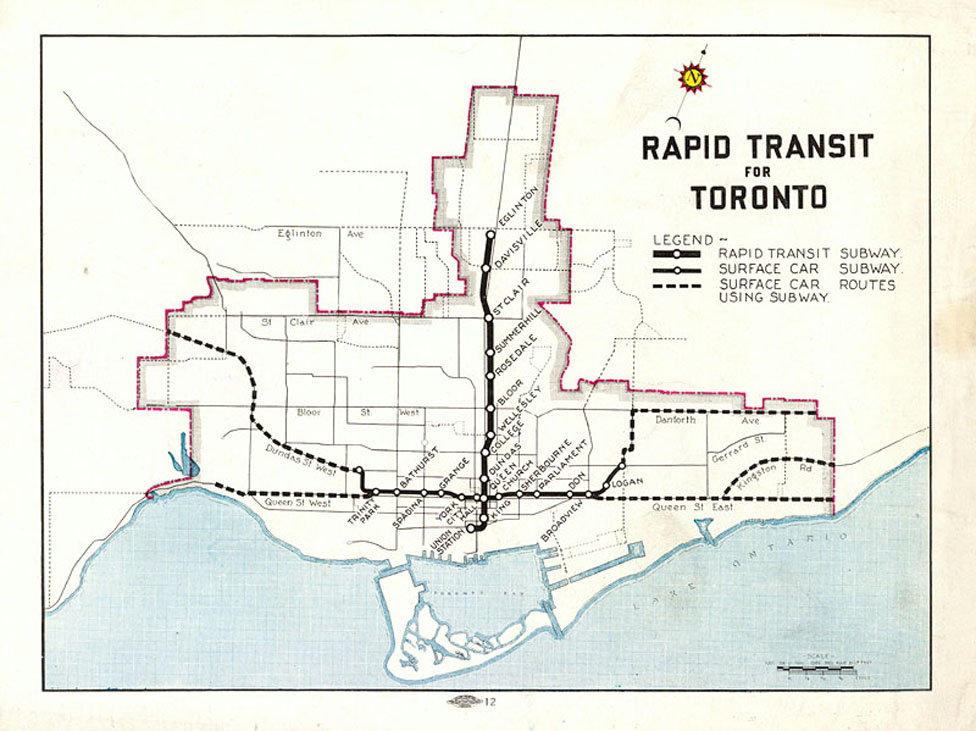
Early precursors to the Relief Line in 1910 and 1944

As opposed to underground trains used in many modern subway systems, early 20th-century rapid transit proposals such as the Relief Line were for underground streetcars as premetros.

On 25 August 1910, the first serious proposal for the Relief Line was made by Jacobs & Davies, a New York City‐based firm of consulting engineers, with The Report on Transit to the Mayor and Council of the City of Toronto. An underground streetcar formed a rough U-shape from today's Broadview station, along the waterfront to Spadina Avenue, and then following Spadina Avenue, College Street, Dovercourt Road, Bloor Street and Dundas Street to the West Toronto Diamond.

Plans from 1911 and 1944 also called for the Queen streetcar to be underground. When the original Yonge line was built in 1954, Queen station was built with roughed-in infrastructure for the proposed underground streetcar platform. Most of this unfinished portion of the station is inaccessible to the public; it is sometimes referred to as Lower Queen.

In June 1968, one month after Bloor–Danforth line extensions to Warden and Islington stations opened and a few months before construction of the Eglinton to Finch portion of the system was started, the TTC made clear that a Queen subway line from Roncesvalles Avenue to Donlands station should be the next priority. The Toronto Star reported on 12 June 1968 that the 17-station, 12.5-kilometre (7.8 mi) line would cost between $150 million and $200 million. The TTC acquired land for the corridor on the west side of Greenwood Yard and still holds the Oakvale Greenspace. By mid-1969, the line was considered to be ready for construction but was soon considered a lower priority than the Spadina line at the suburban-dominated Metro Council.

=== 1980s: A new subway line ===
In the 1980s, the TTC, Metropolitan Toronto and the Government of Ontario did several analyses of forecasted urban growth and alternative transportation scenarios for the downtown to Bloor area. In 1982, the Accelerated Rapid Transit Study considered multiple options for a "radial line", connecting Dundas West and Donlands stations with a U-shape through downtown. This planning continued into 1985, with downtown alignments following King Street, Queen Street, Front Street and the railways to and from Union Station.

The TTC released the Network 2011 plan in 1985, and a Relief Line was one of the three routes proposed. As part of the 2011 Network plan, the Relief Line was proposed to run between Pape station on the Bloor–Danforth line, south to Eastern Avenue, and then west to Union Station], the Rogers Centre (then known as the SkyDome) and Spadina Avenue.

Three possible alignments were considered for the westward extension. The least expensive would follow the railway right-of-way past the Exhibition GO Station and up to the Galt-Weston railway corridor, taking it to Dundas West station. Another alternative would go west of Strachan Avenue along the Oakville Subdivision rail lines to Roncesvalles Avenue, where it would turn north to connect to the Bloor–Danforth line at Dundas West station. The third alignment considered ran along an elevated guideway on Parkside Drive at the eastern edge of High Park to Keele station.

The Relief Line disappeared from transit plans soon after the province delayed approving Metropolitan Toronto's Network 2011 plan. The provincial government was alarmed over the construction cost and withdrew political support for the new line. There were no serious plans for the Relief Line for the next two decades.

=== 2008–2019: Planning revival ===
In 2008, Metrolinx published The Big Move, the regional transportation plan for the Greater Toronto and Hamilton Area. The plan called for a Relief Line extending in a U-shape from Pape station, through Queen and Osgoode stations to Dundas West within 25 years. Metrolinx Chair Rob MacIsaac stated in 2008 that the line is unlikely to be brought forward from its projected 2020 start date but deemed it of "regional significance". In 2009, Toronto City Council expressed support for this plan. By late 2011, there was renewed interest in the proposal among mainstream media and the general populace.

In March 2012, TTC chief executive officer (CEO) Andy Byford stated there is great need for additional subway capacity with the increasing population of Toronto, and capacity issues along Line 1 Yonge–University: "The downtown relief line has got to be looked at and has got to be talked about right now." Metrolinx officials stated that capacity issues may allow the Relief Line to be given higher priority in the regional transportation plan, The Big Move. Metrolinx CEO Bruce McCuaig stressed that the Downtown Relief Line should be prioritized and completed in 15 years, as part of Metrolinx's "next wave" of projects in The Big Move transit expansion plan. In February 2013, the Metrolinx Board approved changes to The Big Move that re-prioritized the eastern segment of the Relief Line to the 15-year plan, and made it one of the 15 top priority projects in the Greater Toronto and Hamilton Area.

The Downtown Rapid Transit Expansion Study (DRTES) was completed by the TTC in 2012, which examined four alternative Relief Line configurations between Pape and St. Andrew, with varying extensions north to Science Centre station (at Don Mills and Eglinton) and west to Dundas West station. The TTC's 2015 DRL study identified four potential corridors, which involved combinations beginning at Line 2 at Broadview or Pape, and going through downtown via King or Queen Streets. On 31 March 2016, Toronto City Council approved a Relief Line corridor between Pape station and Toronto City Hall, via Pape Avenue and Queen Street. The study was ongoing and examining potential alignments.

On 1 June 2016, the provincial government announced $150 million funding for Metrolinx to plan and design the Relief Line. Metrolinx would collaborate with the TTC and the City in the design. Mayor John Tory estimated the line could be operational within 12 to 15 years (2028–2031). In late June of the same year, a Toronto Star article reported the estimated cost of Phase 1 with eight stops to be $6.8 billion; the project was unfunded.

On 16 April 2018, it was announced that the 120-day Transit Project Assessment Process (TPAP) under the Ontario Environmental Assessment Act had begun for the 7.5-kilometre (4.7 mi) Relief Line South from Osgoode to Pape stations. This study was completed on 24 October 2018. In January 2019, it was announced that the project could open by 2029.

In April 2019, Ontario premier Doug Ford announced that a new Ontario Line would be built instead of the Relief Line. Thus, in June 2019, TTC and City staff suspended further planning work on the Relief Line. At the time of project suspension, design work on the Relief Line was 15 percent complete, and construction was expected to start in 2020 with completion in 2029.

=== Successor: Ontario Line ===
First proposed in April 2019, the Ontario Line will replace the Relief Line project. The Ontario Line will run from Don Valley station in the north to Exhibition Place in the south roughly following the Relief Line route between Pape and Osgoode stations with some differences in routing. While the Relief Line would have been completely tunneled, the Ontario Line would use a mix of elevated and tunneled right-of-way, would take advantage of a railway right-of-way south of Pape station (particularly GO Transit's Lakeshore East and Stouffville lines).

After negotiations, the governments of Toronto and Ontario reached a tentative agreement in October 2019 to build the Ontario Line, with the Ontario government agreeing to pay for the city's share of the costs. Toronto City Council ratified the deal the following week.

Comparison of Relief Line and Ontario Line features in July 2019
	Relief Line	Ontario Line
Route length	7.4 km (4.6 mi)	15.5 km (9.6 mi)
Number of stations	8	15
Estimated cost	$8–$9.2 billion	$10.4–$12 billion
Expected completion	2029	2031
Train type	Heavy rail	Automated rapid transit
Train length	138 m (453 ft)	100 m (330 ft)
Passenger capacity per train	1,458 (designed); 1,100 (observed)	730–850 (assumed)
Train frequency	140 seconds	90 seconds
Daily boardings	206,000	389,000
Percentage reduction of Line 2 crowding	12%	17%
Number of low-income residents served	19,000	34,000

Comparison of Relief Line and Ontario Line station sites in July 2019
Relief Line station (Note: All Relief Line stations were planned to be built underground.)	Ontario Line station	Ontario Line station type (Note: For the Ontario Line, the station type "above ground" means the station could be either at-grade or elevated.)	Notes
Science Centre	Don Valley	Above ground	Stations for a "Relief Line North" were proposed as part of phase 2, but are all included in the Ontario Line proposal.
Flemingdon Park	Flemingdon Park	Above ground	Stations for a "Relief Line North" were proposed as part of phase 2, but are all included in the Ontario Line proposal.
Thorncliffe Park	Thorncliffe Park	Above ground	Stations for a "Relief Line North" were proposed as part of phase 2, but are all included in the Ontario Line proposal.
Cosburn	Cosburn	Underground	Stations for a "Relief Line North" were proposed as part of phase 2, but are all included in the Ontario Line proposal.
Pape	Pape	Underground	Terminus for Relief Line South (phase 1); through-station for the Ontario Line.
Gerrard	Gerrard	Above ground	The Ontario Line station will be along GO Transit's Lakeshore East / Stouffville rail corridor, while the Relief Line station would have been underground.
Carlaw	Leslieville	Above ground	Located along GO Transit's Lakeshore East / Stouffville rail corridor, Leslieville station's site is west of the Relief Line's Carlaw station site.
Broadview (Note: Not to be confused with Broadview station on Line 2)	East Harbour	Above ground	Located along GO Transit's Lakeshore East / Stouffville rail corridor, the East Harbour station site is south of the Relief Line's Broadview station site.
Sumach	Corktown	Underground	The Corktown station site is west of the Relief Line's Sumach station site.
Sherbourne/Queen	Moss Park	Underground	Moss Park and Sherbourne/Queen stations are at the same location.
Queen	Queen	Underground	
Osgoode	Osgoode	Underground	Terminus for Relief Line South (phase 1); through-station for the Ontario Line.
Spadina/Queen	Queen/Spadina	Underground	Relief Line West (phase 3) also had a station proposed for the Queen & Spadina intersection.
N/A	King/Bathurst	Underground	These stations were never part of any official Relief Line proposal.
N/A	Exhibition / Ontario Place	Above ground	These stations were never part of any official Relief Line proposal.

== Potential extensions ==
Potential extensions could have been made northward from the Relief Line's Line 2 connection in the east, as well as westward and northward from downtown to form a wide U-shape.

While Metrolinx, the TTC and the City historically considered the Relief Line as a project south of Bloor Street and Danforth Avenue, Metrolinx, the City of Toronto, York Region and the TTC also partnered on the Yonge Relief Network Study (YRNS) in 2015. This was a more detailed benefits case analysis that examined three different options for providing relief on Line 1:

- Option 1: RER Plus Network, providing enhanced service on GO Transit's Richmond Hill and Stouffville lines.
- Option 2: Relief Line, a fully grade-separated subway line
  - Option 2A: Relief Line Short, between Danforth Avenue and Downtown
  - Option 2B: Relief Line Long, between Sheppard Avenue and Downtown
  - Option 2C: Relief Line U, between Danforth Avenue and Bloor Street, via Downtown
- Option 3: Surface LRT, between Sheppard Avenue and Downtown

The YRNS found that Option 2B (Relief Line Long) would provide the most effective relief on Line 1.

=== North extension ===
Originally, The Big Move had called for the Relief Line to terminate at Danforth Avenue, and for the Don Mills LRT to continue north to Sheppard Avenue and Highway 7. However, planning studies examined the potential extension of the Relief Line northward, serving the former borough of East York, and an eastern portion of North York. From Danforth Avenue, the extension would have proceeded north on Pape Avenue through Pape Village, across the Don Valley, east on Overlea Boulevard through Thorncliffe Park; and north again on Don Mills Road to Sheppard Avenue and Don Mills station. As of January 2019, an environmental assessment of this possible extension was performed. Part of this extension was later incorporated into the Ontario Line proposal.

=== West extension ===
The Big Move called for the Relief Line to continue west of Osgoode station and connect with Line 2 in the west. From downtown, this extension would have proceeded west on Queen Street West and north on Roncesvalles Avenue and Dundas Street to Dundas West station. This was in contrast to the Ontario Line, which is planned to run to Exhibition Place.

== Name ==
Although the name Downtown Relief Line was used in planning discussions since at least 1985, there was debate about the use of the name. While it will be geographically located to serve downtown, local transit observers have pointed out the line will have benefits for transit riders located in the outer suburbs of Toronto. Given political sensitivity over transit planning in Scarborough during the tenure of former mayor Rob Ford, who was the brother of Doug Ford, using the word "downtown" in a future subway line's name was perceived to be negative from the perspective of Rob Ford's primarily suburban base. In early 2013, TTC chair Karen Stintz said, "There is a general view that that line needs to get renamed."

Planning undertaken by the City of Toronto referred to the proposed line simply as the "Relief Line". According to the 2018–2022 TTC Corporate Plan, the Relief Line was being tentatively designated as Line 3 and coloured blue, matching the existing line number and colouring of Line 3 Scarborough, as that existing rapid transit line was intended to be replaced by an extension of Line 2 by the time the Relief Line was projected to be complete.

== See also ==
- Eglinton West line
- Line 5 Eglinton, the successor of the Eglinton West line
- Scarborough subway extension of Line 2 Bloor–Danforth
- SmartTrack, a proposed regional express rail line serving a similar corridor to the Relief Line
