= Graffiti Alley, Toronto =

Alleyway with street art in Toronto, Ontario, Canada

Coordinates: 43°38′52″N 79°23′56″W

- Rush Lane
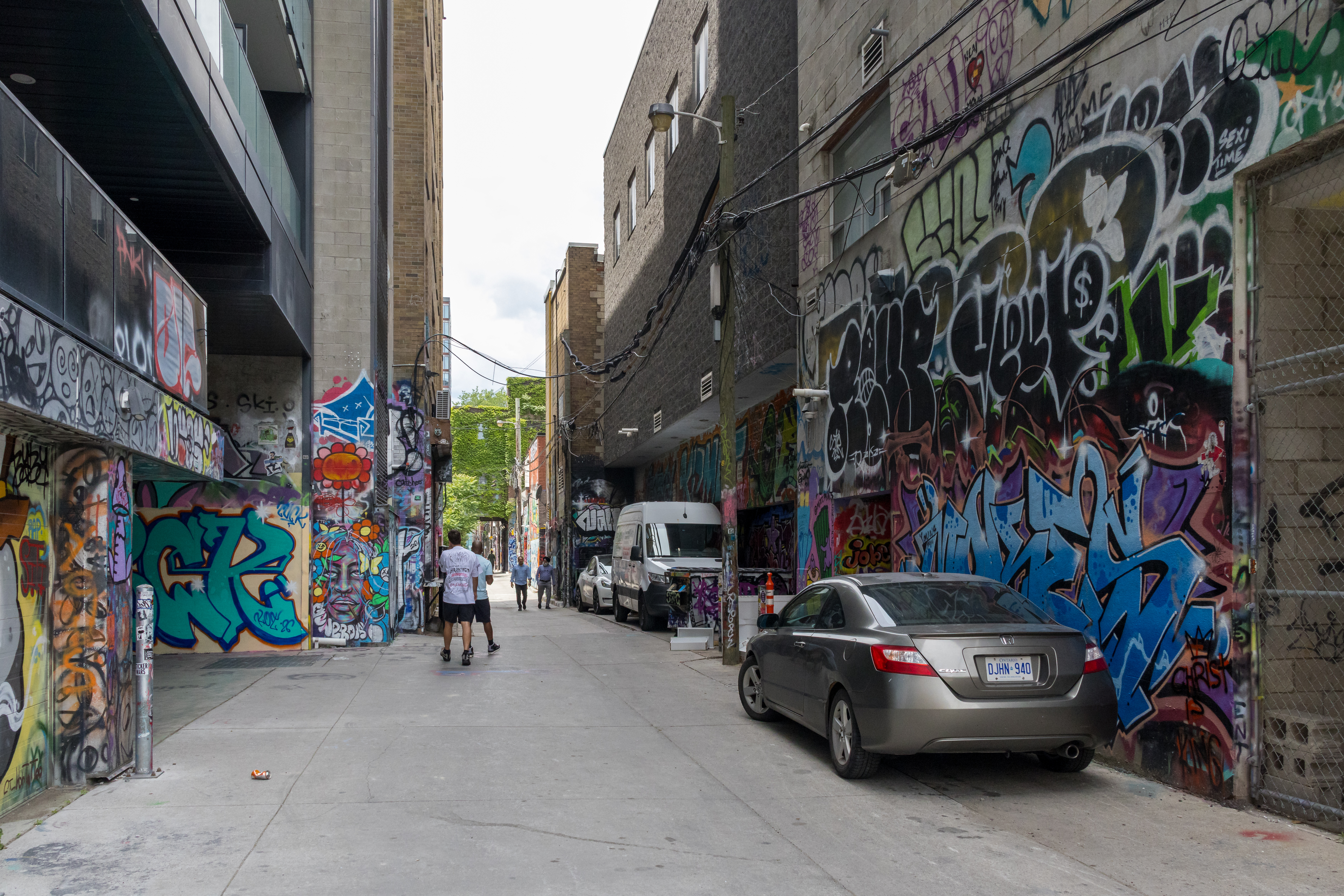
- Part of the alleyway in 2026
- Interactive map of Graffiti Alley, Toronto
- Length: 1 km (0.62 mi)
- Width: 4 metres (13 ft)
- Location: Toronto, Ontario, Canada
- Nearest metro station: Osgoode Station
- West end: Portland Street
- East end: Spadina Avenue

Other
- Known for: Graffiti
Nearby arterial roads in Toronto
← Queen Street	Bloor Street →

Graffiti Alley, officially Rush Lane, is a three-block, 1-km alleyway in Toronto's Fashion District, known for hosting street art. Lonely Planet has called the site "possibly the most popular place to check out street art in Toronto". The alleyway was used prominently as the backdrop in Rick Mercer Report's "Rant" segment. Despite its popularity with tourists and leniency by law enforcement, it is not a legal wall.

== See also ==
- Graffiti in Toronto
