= Graffiti in Austin, Texas =

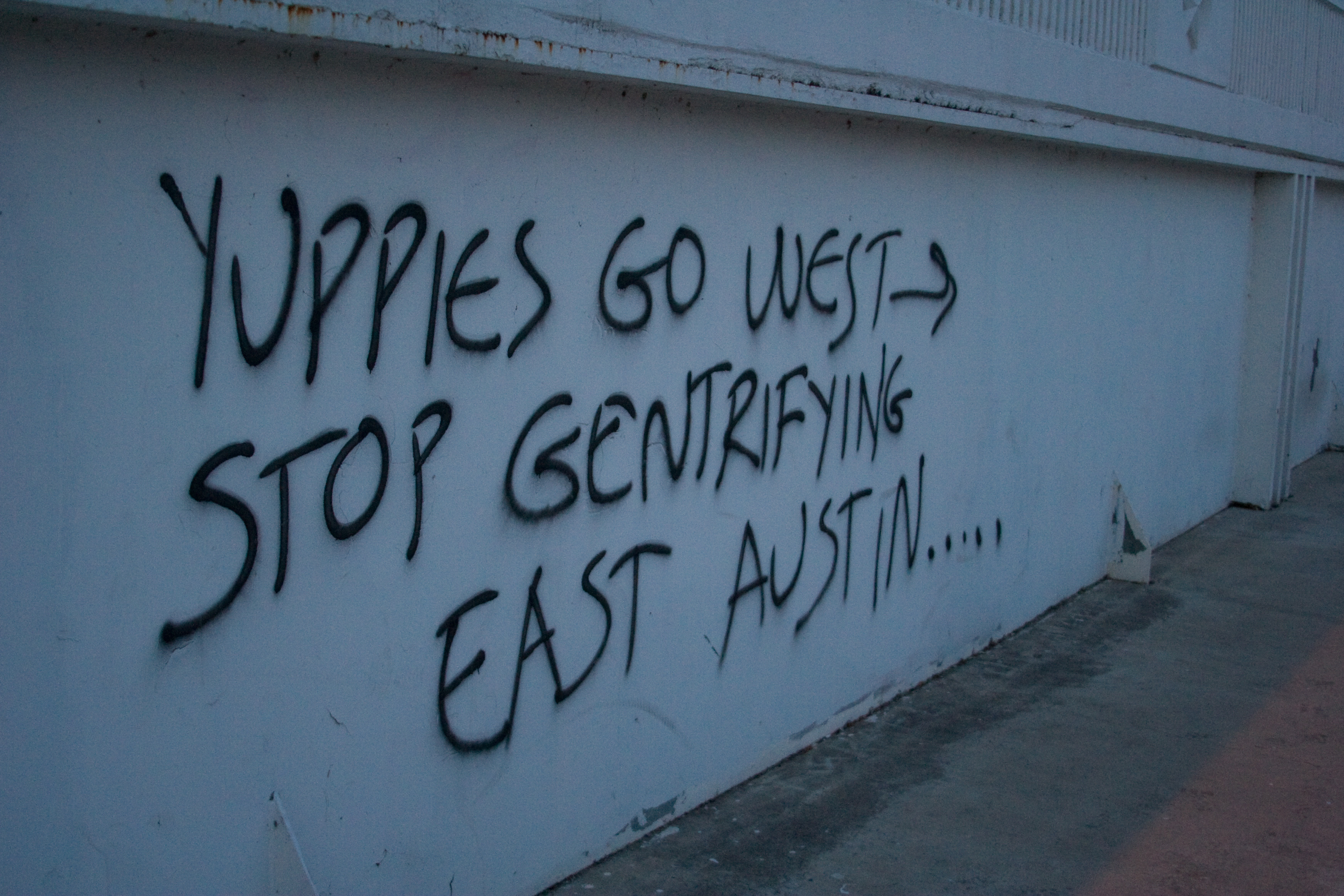
Graffiti in Austin, Texas

Graffiti is a cause of disagreement among residents of Austin, Texas.

== Notable Graffiti ==
Crossing Lady Bird Lake is a Union Pacific railroad bridge whose west side (the side that's visible from the James D. Pfluger Pedestrian and Bicycle Bridge) is frequently covered in graffiti. Unlike traditional graffiti, however, the graffiti on this bridge is often inspirational (eg. "Never Give Up") or whimsical (eg. "I've Got Ninja Style And A Kung Fu Grip") in nature.

In August 2022, The Austin Chronicle published an interview with TVHeadATX, whose graffiti around town features "a business-suited citizen with a big old-fashioned cathode-ray-tube of a television in place of where his head should be". In December 2022, KXAN-TV ran an article talking about the then rampant "Buscar" graffiti that was appearing around town. In March 2023, KXAN-TV reported on the appearance of "I was raped, I am OK" graffiti appearing throughout the city.

== Notable Street Art ==
In 1993, local record store Sound Exchange commissioned musician Daniel Johnston to paint "Hi, How Are You" on the side of their building, located on The Drag. In 2018, American Campus Communities bought the building on which the mural had been painted and, in 2023, demolished it, leaving only the mural and the wall on which it was painted still standing.. A November 2012 article in The Daily Texan described the "Hi, How Are You" frog as "one of Austin's most iconic pieces of street art".

In 2010, musician Amy Cook spray painted "i love you so much" on the side of Jo's Coffee on South Congress. Amy Cook was dating Jo's Coffee owner Liz Lambert at that time. By 2013 the Austin American-Statesman was describing the mural as "an iconic Austin spot".

== HOPE Outdoor Gallery ==
HOPE Outdoor Gallery is a graffiti park that, as of November 2025, is located close to Austin–Bergstrom International Airport. HOPE Outdoor Gallery was originally located in the north east corner of the Castle Hill Local Historic District in downtown Austin from 2011 to 2019.

== Clean Up Efforts ==
In 2021 and 2022 the City of Austin spent $500,000 / year cleaning up graffiti. In 2022 that amounted to 33,000 sqft of graffiti, mostly in skate parks. At that time graffiti on city property was cleaned up by the city and graffiti on private property was to be cleaned up by the property owner within 30 days.

In September 2025 the City of Austin passed an ordinance wherein the city would clean up graffiti on private property free of charge.
