= Legal wall =

Type of graffiti wall

Legal walls or open walls, are public spaces where graffiti is allowed by any member of the public.

Legal walls started in Scandinavia, and the first legal wall was likely the klotterplanket ("scribble board") in Stockholm which opened in 1968. The wall was repainted white every morning by a civil servant. They are still most common in Scandinavia, as well as Australia where there are over thirty legal walls in Canberra alone. However, legal walls exist around the world.

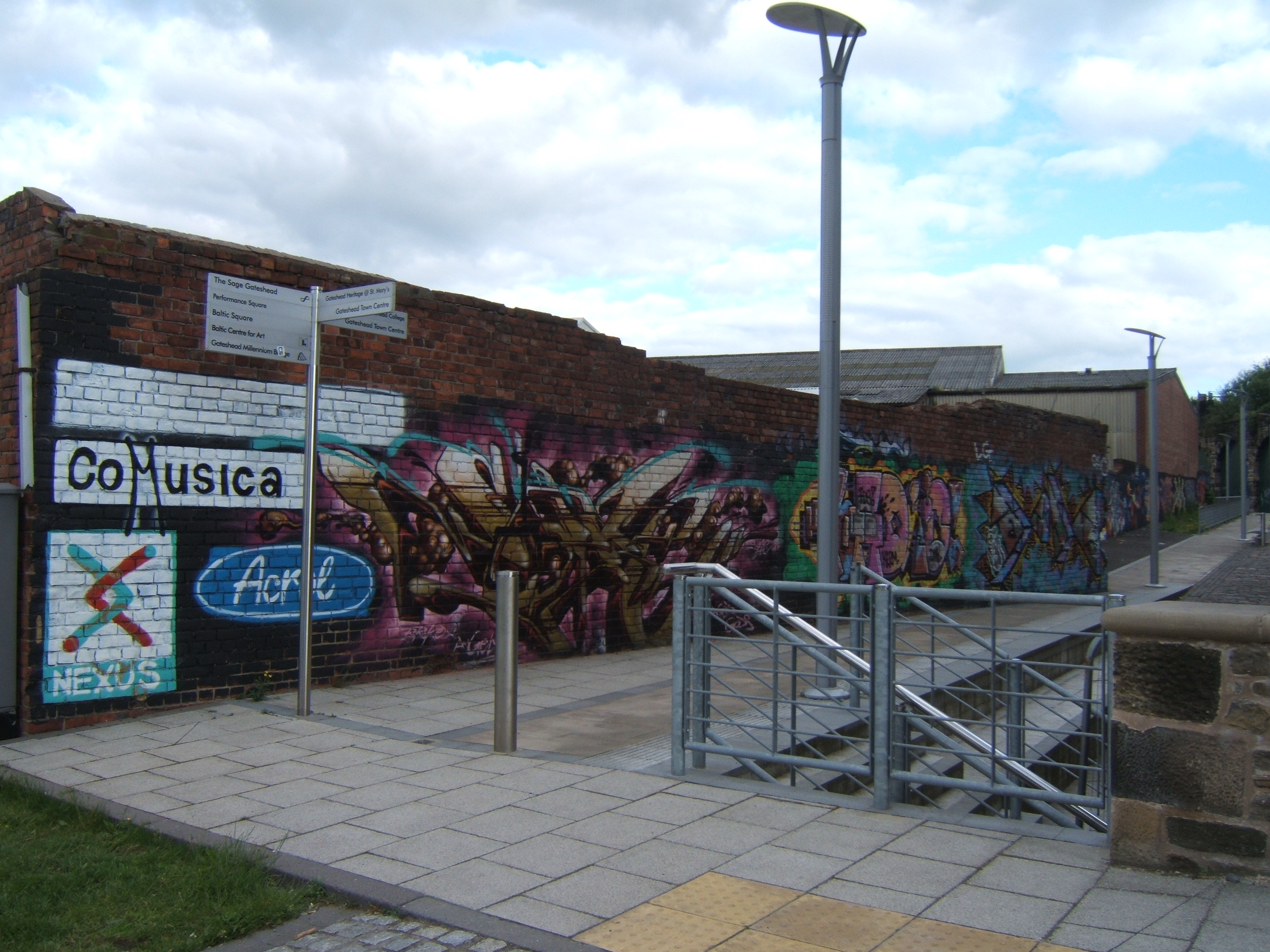
A legal wall in the UK with sponsors logos at the start

Legal walls are different from commissioned murals or commercial graffiti as writers and artists are given relative freedom in what they create, although hateful messages are often disallowed. They may be state-designated spaces or privately owned. Privately owned walls may need council permission to exist in some jurisdictions, where graffiti-style art is illegal in public even if done on personal property.

== Culture ==
In typical graffiti spaces, going over someone elses writing (or "capping") is an insult, but legal walls are often repainted multiple times a day with no disrespect taken by artists.

Some writers dismiss legal graffiti as "not real" and avoid legal walls. These people may consider a writer who uses legal walls to be a toy (inexperienced or uncultured writer). Some writers believe that legal walls defeats the purpose of graffiti, as a rebellious act to reclaim public space. Writers interested in acquiring graffiti "fame" are often uninterested in legal walls. Despite this, legal walls are used equally by both inexperienced and experienced writers. They can attract "retired" writers who are at a higher risk from doing illegal graffiti.

Cameron McAuliffe says legal walls can help legitimise graffiti as an art form. This was seen on a legal wall in Malmö, where after a group of young people were attacked by neo-nazis, large scale protests were held and a local legal wall was painted with a piece using the words "Kämpa Malmö" ("Keep fighting Malmö") with a rainbow ribbon, and the anti-fascist slogan "No Pasaran". The piece became an attraction, and was restored multiple times. There were calls for the art to be protected by the local council.

== Effect on illegal graffiti ==
There is debate about whether legal walls discourage or encourage illegal graffiti. Parramatta in Australia used to have several legal walls, but after the local council decided on a zero-tolerance policy in related to graffiti in 2009, all but one of the legal walls were demolished. The council said that graffiti had decreased in the area since the legal walls were removed. Other research has shown that legal walls reduce illegal graffiti by giving writers a safer, often visible space for their art. Opponents of legal walls argue that if writers wanted to produce art legally, they would already be using canvases instead of illegal spaces.

== Places mistaken as legal walls ==
Some places are "grey areas", where graffiti is not legal but is generally left up by authorities, often due to popularity with tourists. These include Hosier Lane in Melbourne and Rush Lane (Graffiti Alley) in Toronto. Others walls exist as something between commissioned art and legal graffiti walls, and are curated, invitation-only art walls that are in public spaces but not open to anyone to paint on such as the Venice Art Walls.

== Notable legal walls ==
Fully legal walls include

- 5 Pointz (in Queens, New York City)
- Graffiti Alley, Baltimore
- Graffiti tunnel at the University of Sydney
- House of Paint (skatepark)
- Leake Street
- Modica Way
- The Buszy (skatepark)
- Free Expression Tunnel
- HOPE Outdoor Gallery (in Austin, Texas)
- Graffiti Street (in Ghent, Belgium)

== See also ==
- Broken windows theory
- Public art
- Legal graffiti spaces (category)
