= Modica Way =

Graffiti wall

Richard B. Modica Way
- Graffiti Alley
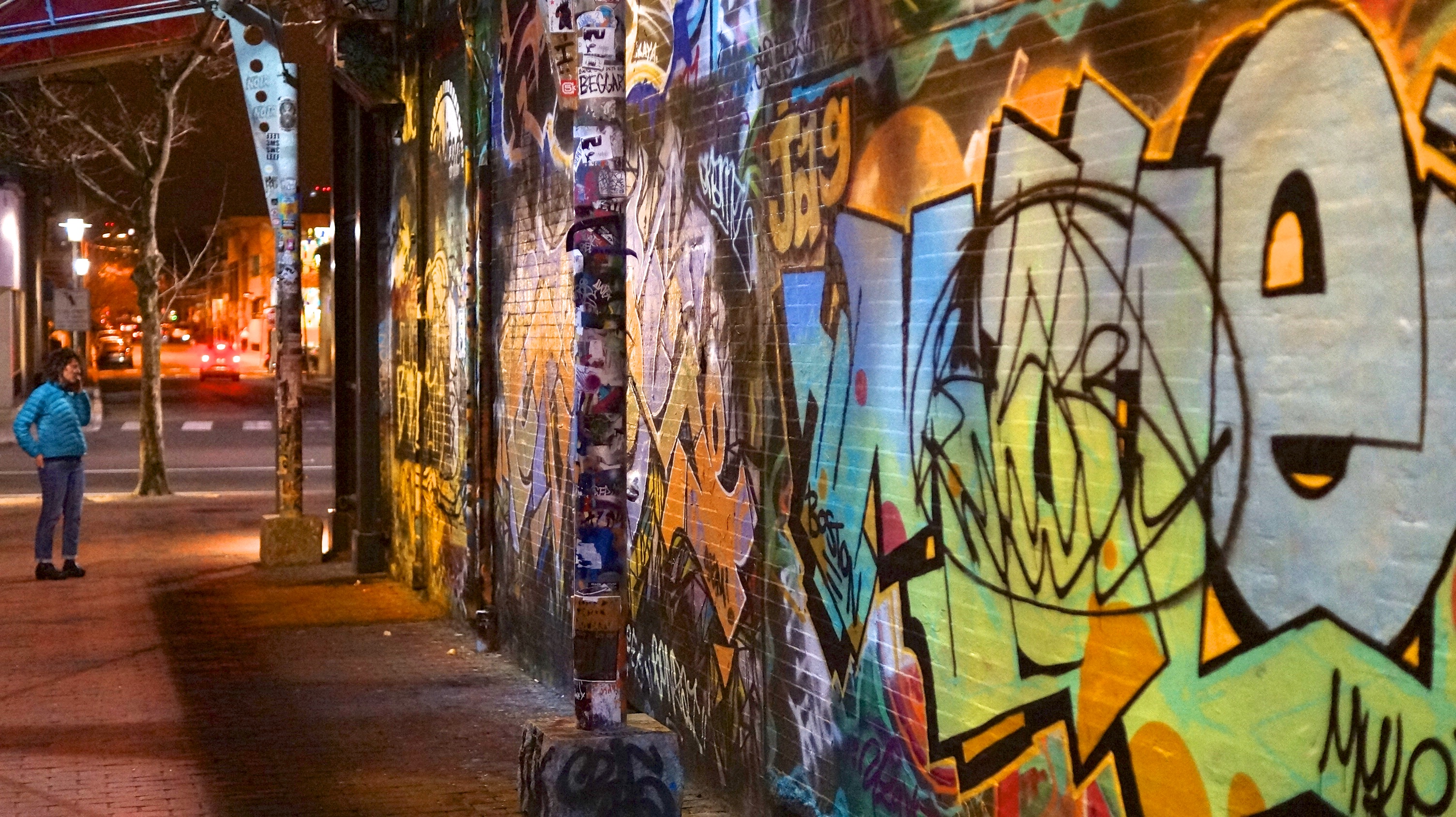
- View of the street in 2013
- Part of: Central Square
- Namesake: Richard B. Modica
- Location: Cambridge, Massachusetts

Modica Way (officially Richard B. Modica Way; alternatively Graffiti Alley) is a legal graffiti gallery in Central Square, Cambridge, Massachusetts. It was begun in 2006 and has been described as "the hallmark of Central Square" and "one of Boston's most instagrammable spots."
