= Graffiti in Toronto =

Graffiti in Toronto, Ontario, Canada, is a cause of much disagreement among its residents. Graffiti is seen by some as an art form adding to the Toronto culture; however, others see graffiti as form of vandalism, viewing it as ugly, or as a form of property damage.

== History ==
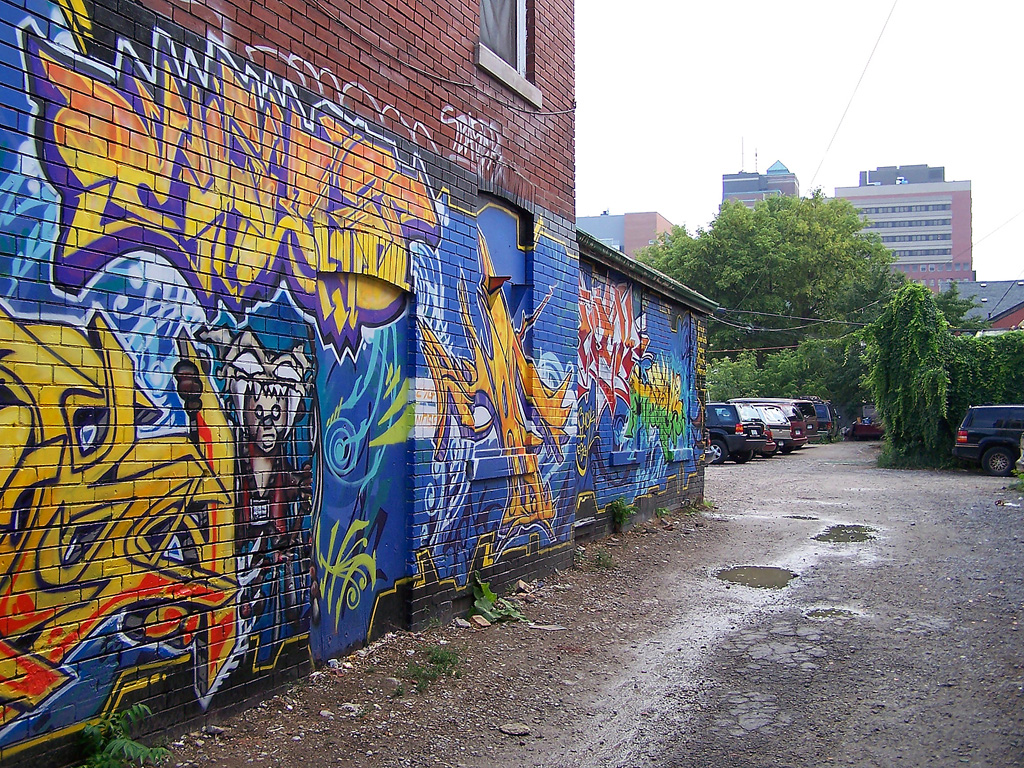
Graffiti in a Toronto alley in 2005.

Graffiti was well established in downtown Toronto by the early 1980s. By the mid-1990s, many graffiti pieces and tags were observable in various alleyways and other outdoor areas around the city. (A book collection of some of those works, titled “Tags & Pieces”, was published in 1997 ). One blogger remarked that pieces on Toronto buildings, walls and overpasses embrace the culture of New York City.

In September 2019, graffiti art on 26 garage doors near Ossington Street and Queen Street West were accidentally painted over black. Weeks later, graffiti artists were invited to restore the street art.

== Debate over graffiti ==
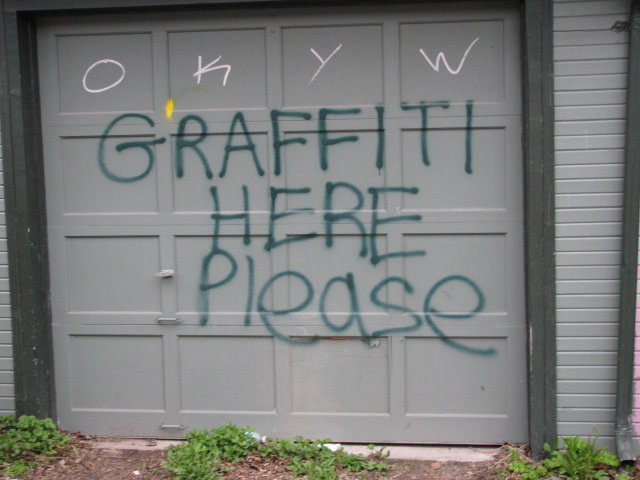
A request for art, or an act of vandalism? The question if graffiti constitutes one or the other has become a topic of debate in Toronto.

There has been a debate regarding the issue of graffiti in Toronto as to whether or not graffiti constitutes art or vandalism, with former Mayor Rob Ford vowing to remove all graffiti from the City of Toronto, defining graffiti as "One or more letters, symbols, figures, etching, scratches, inscriptions, stains, or other markings that disfigure or deface a structure or thing, howsoever made or otherwise affixed on the structure or thing, but, for greater certainty, does not include an art mural" and defines an art mural as a "mural for a designated surface and location that has been deliberately implemented for the purpose of beautifying the specific location." Mural work also serves as a platform to create and link communities, document history and tradition, and to facilitate purpose and voice to its collaborators. Mural painting is not simply about making something visually appealing; the majority of active mural artists create work that captures the human experience and transforms intangible words and emotion to something that can be seen and touched.

Graffiti is managed through a coordinating body established under the municipal government of Toronto's Graffiti Management Plan. The body provides support and municipal recognition for legitimate instances of graffiti, although also provides support, and enforcement against illegal instances of graffiti. By-laws governing legitimate and illegitimate instances of graffiti are found in the City of Toronto Municipal Code.

=== Efforts to curb graffiti ===
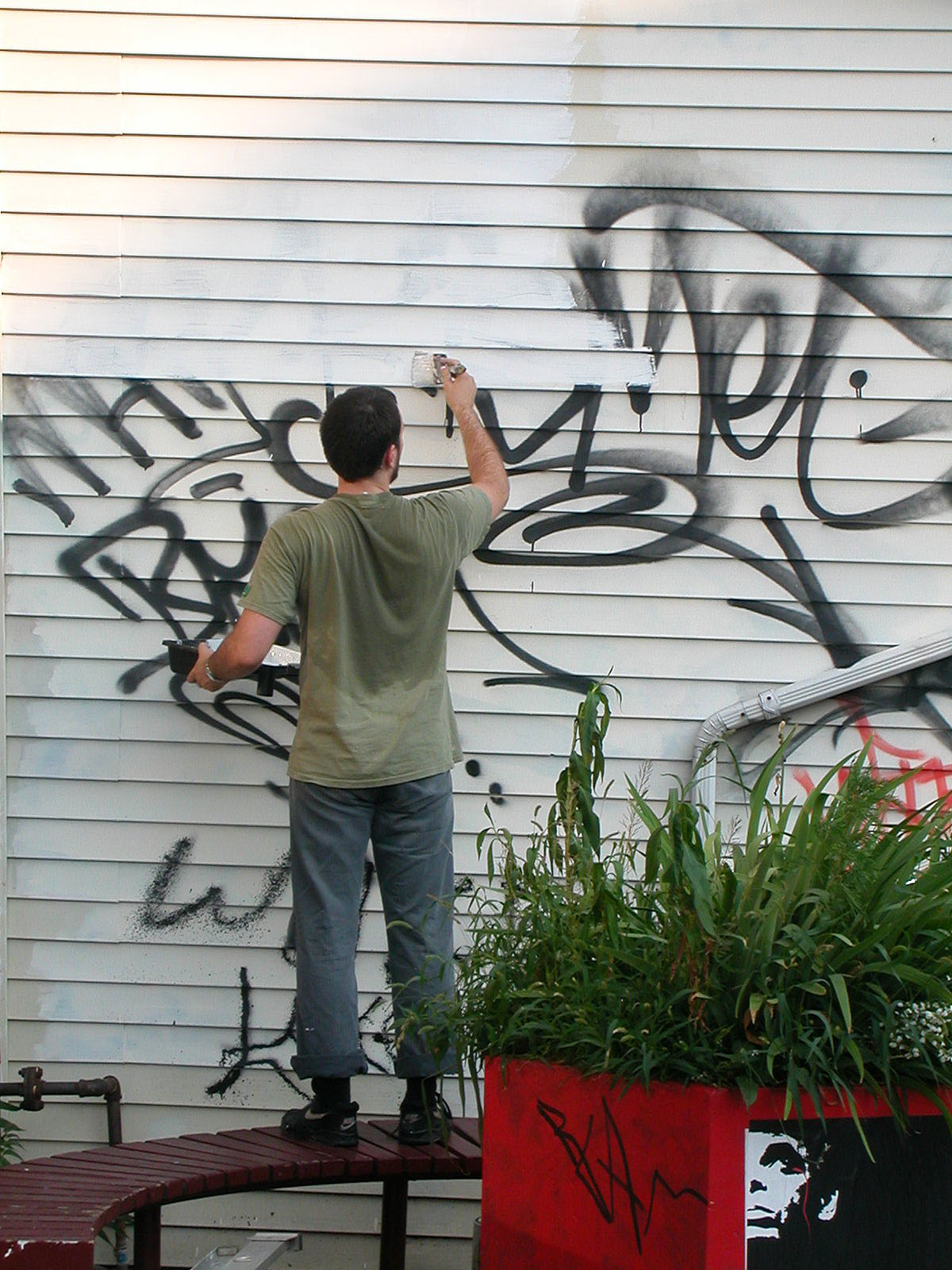
A person painting over graffiti in Toronto

There are many coalitions that have been created to deter and remove graffiti in Toronto. These organizations or groups agree that graffiti has many negative effects on the city. The official website for the City of Toronto has stated that graffiti can promote a belief that community laws protecting property can be disregarded and that graffiti creates a sense of disrespect for property that may result in an increase of crime.

The "Graffiti Transformation Program" is an annual community investment program which hires youth to remove graffiti and resurface the walls with attractive murals. Since the program's start in 1996, over 9,000 tags have been removed, over 300 sites cleaned, and 430 murals created. The program has provided jobs, training, and skills to approximately 1,276 youth.

The Toronto Police Services have also undertaken the "Graffiti Eradication Program" which is defined as "a service-wide initiative focusing on the reduction of crime, fear, and disorder as it relates to graffiti."

==== Bylaws ====
The Council of the City of Toronto has adopted a graffiti bylaw in 2005 (revised in 2011) that lists definitions, prohibitions, and the cost of the offence. "Graffiti art" and "graffiti vandalism" are distinguished. Individuals and businesses under this bylaw must remove graffiti vandalism on their property at their own expense or else the city will remove the graffiti for them and send the bill. Graffiti allowed by municipal permits is called "graffiti art". Graffiti art does not need to be removed.

=== Legitimization of graffiti ===
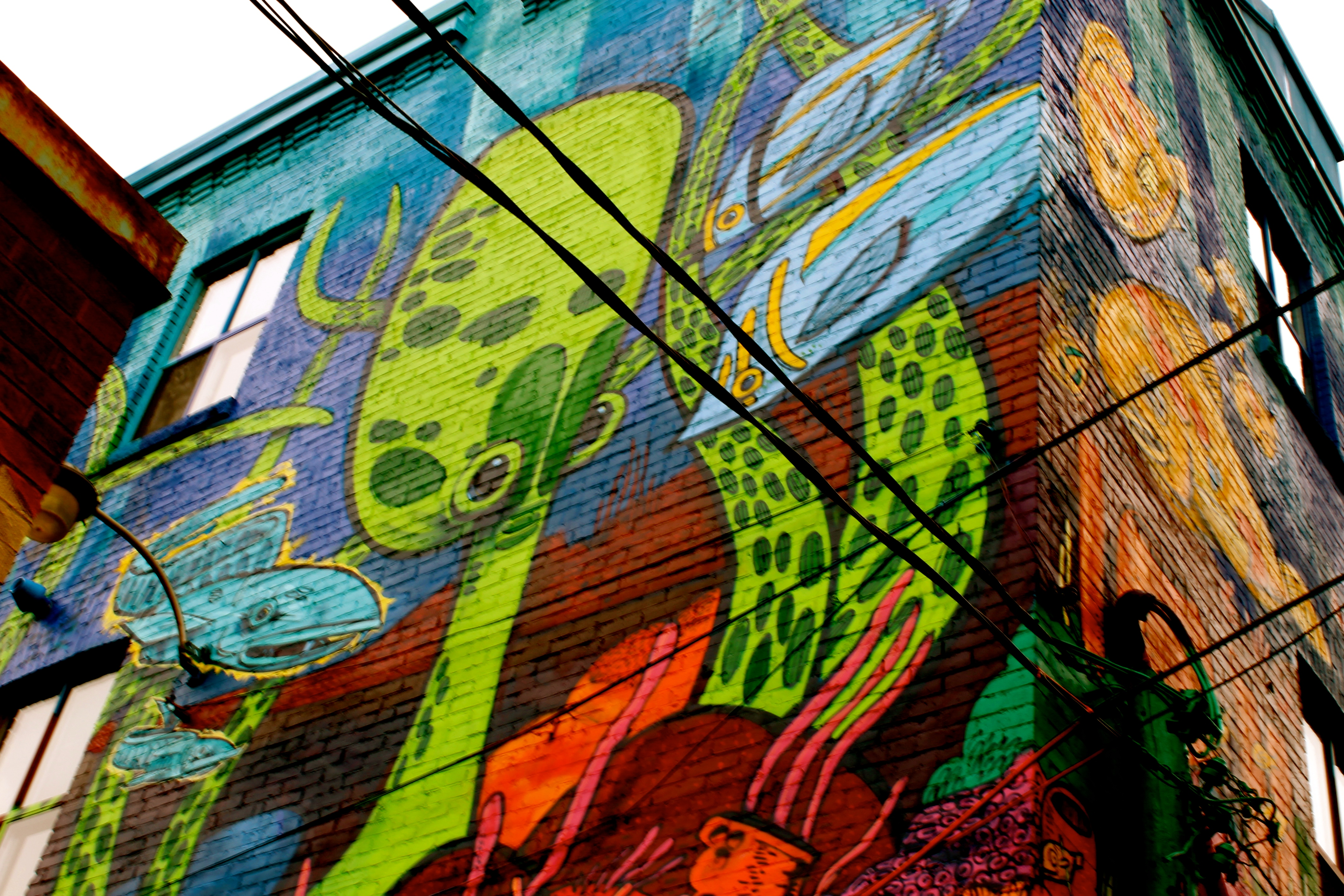
"Graffiti Alley" (Rush Lane), the laneway south of Queen Street West from John Street to Bathurst Street was named an area of municipal significance in 2011, with programs later created to nurture legal street art.

A public effort that legitimized the use of graffiti was established by the Queen Street West Business Improvement Association (BIA) for the area colloquially known as Graffiti Alley (originally Rush Lane). Chair of the BIA, Spencer Sutherland, initiated this movement to protect property owners who did not wish to remove the graffiti street art and were being ticketed. The BIA claimed that the area was culturally significant, citing Rick Mercer's use of the laneway, between Queen Street and Richmond Street, from Spadina Avenue to Portland Street, during his "Rick’s Rants" monologue on his CBC Television shows, notably The Rick Mercer Report, and argued that it is a popular destination for photography and draws urban tourists to the area on a daily basis.

The entire laneway south of Queen St West from John Street to Bathurst Street was officially designated as an area of municipal significance in the Graffiti Management Plan adopted by Toronto City Council on July 12, 2011. In September 2015, Vogue Magazine cited Queen West as the second coolest neighbourhood in the world, crediting the area's trendsetting "street style" to Graffiti Alley. The Queen St West BIA and local tour company Tour Guys host walking tours through Graffiti Alley for visitors to experience and learn about graffiti street art. The Laneway Project and Queen Street West BIA host a party in Graffiti Alley called Layers of Rush Lane: A Party in Graffiti Alley. The Press Pause artist collective is recognized as contributors to Rush Lane. Style In Progress, a graffiti and hip hop event, that takes place at Sankofa Square and in Rush Lane.

== Notable Toronto graffiti artists ==
In an attempt by the City of Toronto to clean up graffiti while not differentiating between art and vandalism, many graffiti artists or "writers" are only identifiable by their signatures in order to remain anonymous. Serious and experienced writers follow unwritten rules amongst each other in order to maintain a hierarchy of respect within the community.

The StART Program maintains a directory of street artists and writers based/from Toronto, or have graffiti in Toronto. The registry has grown to approximately 200 entries as of April 2019. Artists and writers that have a background in graffiti that is registered in the StART program include ARTCHILD, Getso, Jessey Pacho, Li-Hill, MEDIAH, Nando Zevê, Peru 143, Shalak Attack, shayne rivet, SPH, Style Over Status, and Takeo Ten.

== In popular culture ==
The "Rant" segment of CBC Television's Rick Mercer Report featured comedian Rick Mercer walking along the graffiti-covered alleys of Queen Street West, in which he discussed his personal views on contemporary Canadian politics. This segment was originally on another CBC Television show This Hour Has 22 Minutes before Rick Mercer Report was spun off.

In 2019, the bar Graffiti Spot was opened in Richmond Hill, a municipality situated north of Toronto, with the aim to promote art by local graffiti writers.
