= HOPE Outdoor Gallery =

Outdoor graffiti park in Austin, Texas

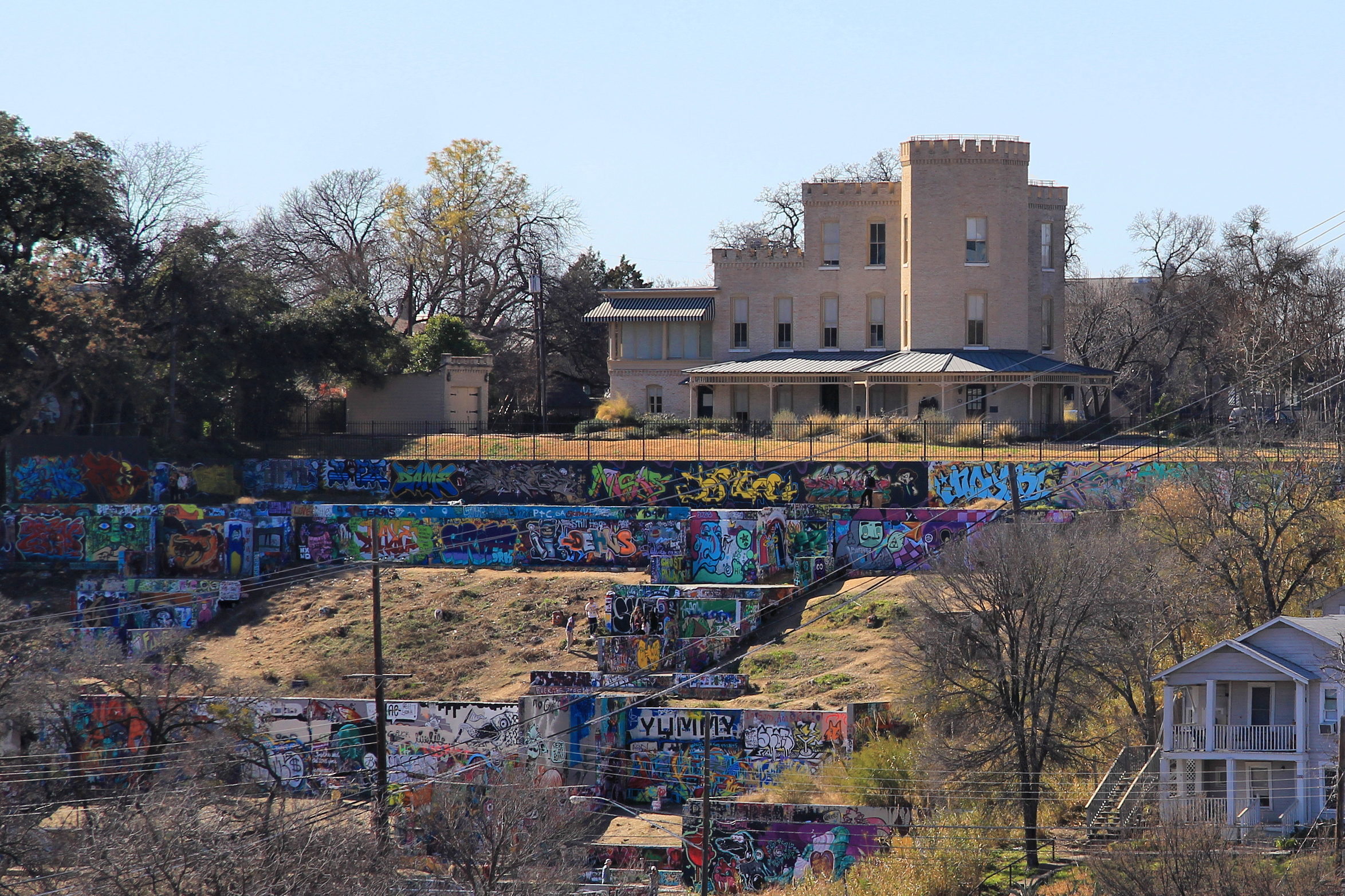
- The original HOPE Outdoor Gallery in 2014
- Interactive map of the HOPE Outdoor Gallery area

General information
- Location: 741 Dalton Lane, Austin, Texas, United States
- Coordinates: 30.2296684°N 97.667752°W

HOPE Outdoor Gallery is a graffiti park that, as of November 2025, is located close to Austin–Bergstrom International Airport at 741 Dalton Lane. HOPE Outdoor Gallery was originally located in the north east corner of the Castle Hill Local Historic District in downtown Austin from 2011 to 2019.

== Castle Hill Location (2011 - 2019) ==
The original 1.2-acre Castle Hill site was located at 1008 Baylor Street, just outside the Old West Austin Historic District. It sat at the base of a hill topped by a "castle-like three-story structure" built in 1869 as the home of the Texas Military Institute, a military high school.

In the 1980s, the property at the base of the hill was developed into a terraced single-story condominium complex called Le Palestra. After the developers filed suit against several subcontractors over structural deficiencies - at a time when the nearly completed condominiums still stood empty - the property was sold at a foreclosure auction to NCNB Texas National Bank for US$377,000 in 1989. The building was demolished in the early 1990s, with only the foundations remaining. An eyesore to neighbors, the property changed hands several times after that. In 2007, Dick Clark + Associates had commenced work on designing a new condominium complex for the property, however, those plans fell through amid the onset of the Great Recession.

Just before South by Southwest 2011, then owners Vic Ayad and Dick Clark allowed HOPE (Helping Other People Everywhere) to run a short-term outdoor gallery on the property - then called Local to Global Outdoor Gallery Project. To prepare the site, HOPE founder Andi Scull cleared the property and artist Shepard Fairey put up posters on some of the concrete slabs. Those posters, however, quickly became overrun with graffiti, most of which was attributed to the graffiti crew TCK, one of Austin's largest graffiti crews, at least as of 2011. Consequently, Vic Ayad and Dick Clark closed the site, putting up "No Trespassing" signs and yellow barrier tape. "You wouldn't go and paint over a Picasso" Dick Clark told The Austin Chronicle. Local to Global Outdoor Gallery Project re-opened back up to the public in time for South by Southwest 2012 and then never closed after that.

In August 2016, CultureMap reported that property taxes, insurance and other holding costs amounted to $100,000 / year.

HOPE Outdoor Gallery continued to operate out of this location until 2019 when the sloping portion of the property was sold to the Cumby Group, which broke ground on The Colorfield, a 0.67 acre luxury condominium complex, in 2021. Consisting of 10 units, ranging between 3,200 and 5,058 sqft with a starting price of $3.6 million, construction on The Colorfield concluded in 2025. (Note: The November 14, 2025 archive.org snapshot of thecolorfieldaustin.com shows "NOW COMPLETED!", however, the August 13, 2025 archive.org snapshot does not.) As an homage to HOPE Outdoor Gallery, The Colorfield has a permanent mural wall. As of 2025, Vic Ayad still owned the remaining flatter part of the original 1.2 acres (now mapped as 1109 W. 11th St.) and had plans to develop that land into 12 three-bedroom condominiums. (co-owner Dick Clark died from cancer in 2017)

In HOPE Outdoor Gallery's final months at the Castle Hill location, Austin-based SubVRsive made 3D scans of the property that can now be viewed at the Austin Public Library via VR headsets.

== Carson Creek Ranch Location (2025 -) ==
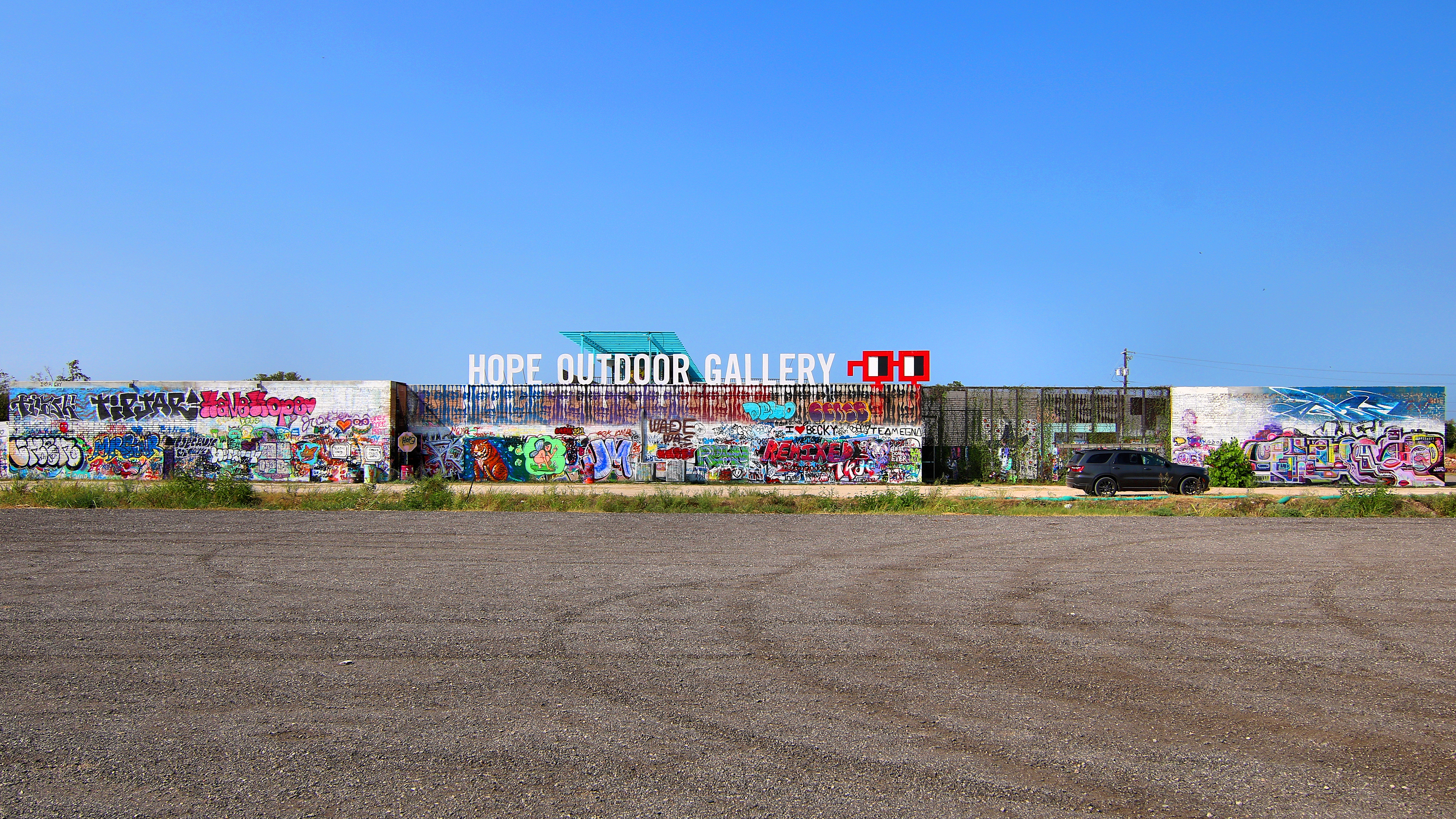
The HOPE Outdoor Gallery as of 2025

A little over a mile away from Austin–Bergstrom International Airport, as the crow flies, lies Carson Creek Ranch. Originally known as MacArthur-Sneed Ranch, Carson Creek Ranch is a Century Ranch that, today, operates as an event venue. Past events hosted by Carson Creek Ranch include Euphoria Festival, from 2014 to 2017, and Levitation, from 2013 to 2015.

In 2018, Carson Creek Ranch donated an option to buy 17 acres of land adjacent to theirs to HOPE Outdoor Gallery. In April 2023, amid rising costs, HOPE Outdoor Gallery wound up selling 8 acres back to Carson Creek Ranch so that Carson Creek Ranch might have overflow parking for their events, leaving the HOPE Outdoor Gallery with 9 acres. Between that and permitting issues, COVID-19 and a lawsuit between the two parties that was ultimately dropped, HOPE Outdoor Gallery had an invite-only soft opening at its new location of 741 Dalton Lane on November 26, 2025, held its grand opening on November 28, 2025 (Black Friday) and had a ribbon cutting ceremony on December 17, 2025.

In addition to receiving funding from the land sale, this new location also received funding from the sale of commemorative bricks and from the Nouns DAO Community.

The new location features a piece of wall that was relocated from the original location and includes an installation designed as land art: some of its structures are laid out to spell "H-O-P-E" in 180-foot-long letters, visible from aircraft leaving Austin–Bergstrom International Airport. Additional amenities at the site include a cafe, a rooftop bar, an art supply shop, a food truck park and event spaces.

== Helping Other People Everywhere (HOPE) ==
The organization behind HOPE Outdoor Gallery is Helping Other People Everywhere (HOPE), a 501(c)(3) organization since 2009. The idea for HOPE was born in 2006, after founder Andi Scull Cheatham saw an early cut of The Devil Came on Horseback, a film concerning the War in Darfur, and decided that a campaign "that people can digest easily" was needed.

To raise money, Andi Scull Cheatham reached out to Shepard Fairey, designer of the Barack Obama "Hope" poster, with whom she had collaborated before. By coincidence, Shepard Fairey was in the process of introducing a new wing of his OBEY clothing brand, OBEY Awareness, which donates 100% of profits to various causes, and HOPE wound up being the first beneficiary. Four months later, HOPE received $46,000 from OBEY Awareness.

== See also ==
- Graffiti in Austin, Texas
