= Queen subway line =

Proposed subway line for Toronto, Ontario

The Queen Street subway line was a proposed subway line for the city of Toronto, Ontario, Canada. It was one of many subway lines planned for, but has yet to be built by the Toronto Transit Commission.

== History ==
=== 1911 proposal ===
The idea for a Queen subway line began with streetcar subway line proposals for both Queen Street and Bloor Street by the Department of Roads and Bridges of the City of Toronto Engineers in 1911. It was not until the 1940s that the Queen Street line re-emerged as a potential project.

=== Post-World War II plans ===
The 1944 TTC Rapid Transit Proposals for a Queen Street route and a referendum on January 1, 1946, brought the Queen subway line back to life. The line called for an open-cut with right of way and built to the north of the existing Queen streetcar line.

The Yonge line was built first and subsequently, it was decided to build an east–west subway line along Bloor Street and Danforth Avenue instead of Queen due to changes in traffic and population patterns.

The existing Queen Street streetcar line is the longest and most heavily used. However, the volume of riders did not justify a subway line in the 1960s.

== Stations ==
A rough platform, partial station is all that remains of a station and the proposed Queen subway line with access from a door from the existing Queen station.

Stations on the proposed Queen line:

- Trinity Park
- Bathurst
- Spadina
- Grange
- York
- City Hall
- Yonge (Lower Queen)
- Church
- Sherbourne
- Parliament
- Don
- Broadview
- Logan

== Proposed routes ==
Later changes to the line would have extended the subway to the Humber Loop in the west and Eglinton – Don Mills to the northeast end:

- 1960 – subway from Sunnyside to Greenwood, then from Greenwood to O'Connor Drive and connect with the Bloor-Danforth subway at either Greenwood or Donlands stations
- 1964 – an underground streetcar line from Greenwood to McCaul to replace the existing surface route.
- 1964 – a route was to have the underground section from Jarvis (Sherbourne in 1968 plan) to Spadina. The route re-surfaces between Spadina to Humber Loop and from Jarvis to either Broadview or Pape.
- 1968 – Queen from Humber to Victoria Park
- 1968 – Greenwood and O'Connor to Queen; Queen from Dufferin; Dufferin north to Weston rail corridor to Islington
- 1968 – Greenwood and O'Connor to Queen; Queen from Dufferin; Dufferin north to Weston rail corridor to Eglinton; Eglinton to Martin Grove
- 1968 – Greenwood and Danforth to Queen; Queen from Dufferin; Dufferin north to Weston rail corridor and Eglinton
- 1972 – GO-Urban route using railway corridors – from Eglinton and Kennedy to Don Valley; Don Valley to Union; Union to Dundas West
- 2016 – Along Queen from University to Carlaw, then North to Pape station, with potential for future northward extension
- 2019 – Exhibition to Queen; Queen from Lakeshore rail corridor; Lakeshore rail corridor to Pape; Pape to Overlea; Overlea to Don Mills; Don Mills north to Science Centre Station

The Queen route was not removed from plans until 1975, but a portion of Lower Queen station now contains an elevator shaft due to elevator construction in Queen station in the 1990s.

== See also ==
- Downtown Relief Line
- Queen (TTC)
- Toronto Transit Commission
- Toronto Transportation Commission
- Eglinton West subway
- Ontario Line
