= Queen station =

Toronto subway station

Queen
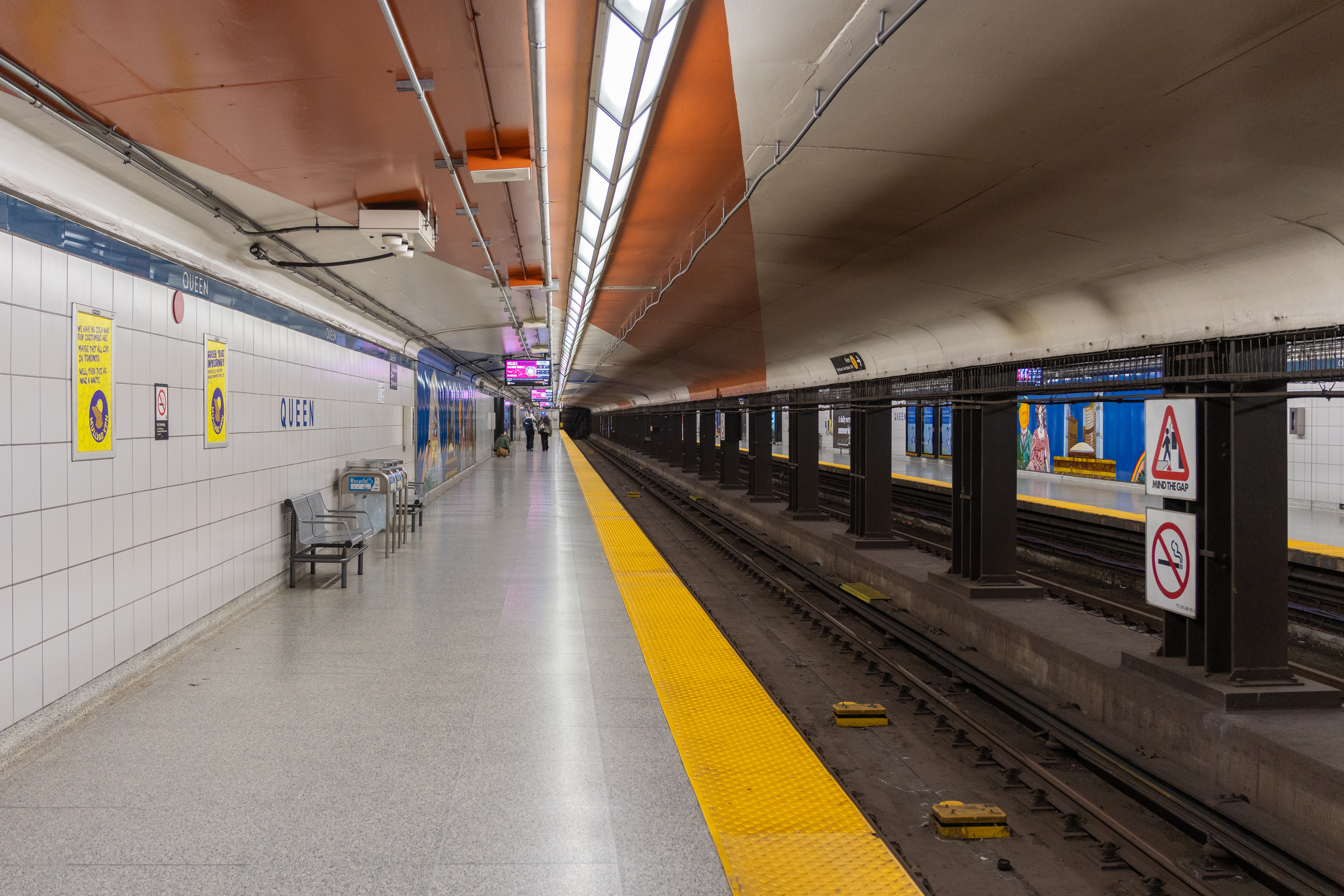

General information
- Location: 3 Queen Street East; Toronto, Ontario; Canada
- Coordinates: 43°39′10″N 79°22′46″W
- Platforms: Side platforms
- Tracks: 2
- Connections: TTC buses and Streetcars: 97 Yonge; 301 Queen; 320 Yonge; 501 Queen

Construction
- Structure type: Underground
- Accessible: Yes

Other information
- Website: Official station page

History
- Opened: March 30, 1954; 72 years ago
- Opening: Ontario Line: 2031; 5 years' time

Passengers
- 2023–2024: 36,714
- Rank: 12 of 70

Services
Preceding station	Toronto Transit Commission	Following station
King towards Vaughan	Line 1 Yonge–University	TMU towards Finch
Future services
Preceding station	Toronto Transit Commission	Following station
Osgoode towards Exhibition	Ontario Line (opens 2030s)	Moss Park towards Don Valley
Location

Queen is a subway station on Line 1 Yonge–University in Toronto, Ontario, Canada. It is located under Yonge Street north from Queen Street to Shuter Street.

== History ==
Queen Station opened in 1954 as part of the original stretch of the Yonge subway line from Union to Eglinton stations. The original address given to the station, 171 Yonge Street, is still commonly used in Toronto Transit Commission (TTC) system maps, but this address is not used for any nearby buildings and points to the actual intersection. The address provided by the TTC website, 3 Queen Street East, is located across from the Maritime Life Tower, by the 1 Queen Street East subway entrance.

In 1997, this station became accessible with elevators.

On December 13, 2013, Toronto Police were called in after gun shots were fired on board a subway train at the station. The Passenger Assistance Alarm was pressed, and the station was evacuated soon after. A man in his 20s was shot and was rushed to nearby St. Michael's Hospital in life-threatening condition but was later stabilized. The station remained closed until the following day, with subway service from Bloor–Yonge to Union stations being replaced by shuttle bus service.

=== Lower Queen ===
Early subway expansion plans called for an east–west subway for streetcars under Queen Street, and a lower Queen station for these was roughed-in under the subway station. Priorities changed and the line was never built, but many people unknowingly pass through this lower station every day; two pedestrian tunnels, which go under the Line 1 tracks to allow riders to move between the northbound and southbound platforms, use portions of this intended station, with most of the excess infrastructure walled off. The roughed-in streetcar station is reached from a locked door along one of the pedestrian tunnels. The second pedestrian tunnel occupies the westbound streetcar platform area. An elevator shaft occupies part of Lower Queen. The streetcar platforms are low-level and short in length.

What exists is a roughed-out second set of platforms built underneath a currently-operating station. It is located directly underneath the existing station. The station was designed as part of a planned but never-built streetcar subway that would have run east and west along Queen Street. A similar station was planned underneath the existing Osgoode (also situated along Queen Street). Although underground pipes and conduits were specifically routed around this intended site, construction was never started.

The trackway was planned for streetcars rather than dedicated subway trains, similar to the present underground streetcar trackage originating at Union station used for the 510 Spadina and 509 Harbourfront routes. The Queen subway would have allowed Queen and other streetcar lines using Queen Street through the downtown core to avoid traffic.

The plan to build a streetcar subway under Queen Street was delayed and then cancelled in favour of an east–west line further north, which became Line 2 Bloor–Danforth. As a result, the Lower Queen Station was never put into service. Unlike the abandoned platform at Lower Bay, this station is not used in any way save as an occasional storage facility and film set, and the aforementioned pedestrian tunnels.

There are plans to use space within Lower Queen to facilitate passenger transfers between Line 1 and the future Ontario Line, which would be drilled out of rock at a lower level.

== Station description ==
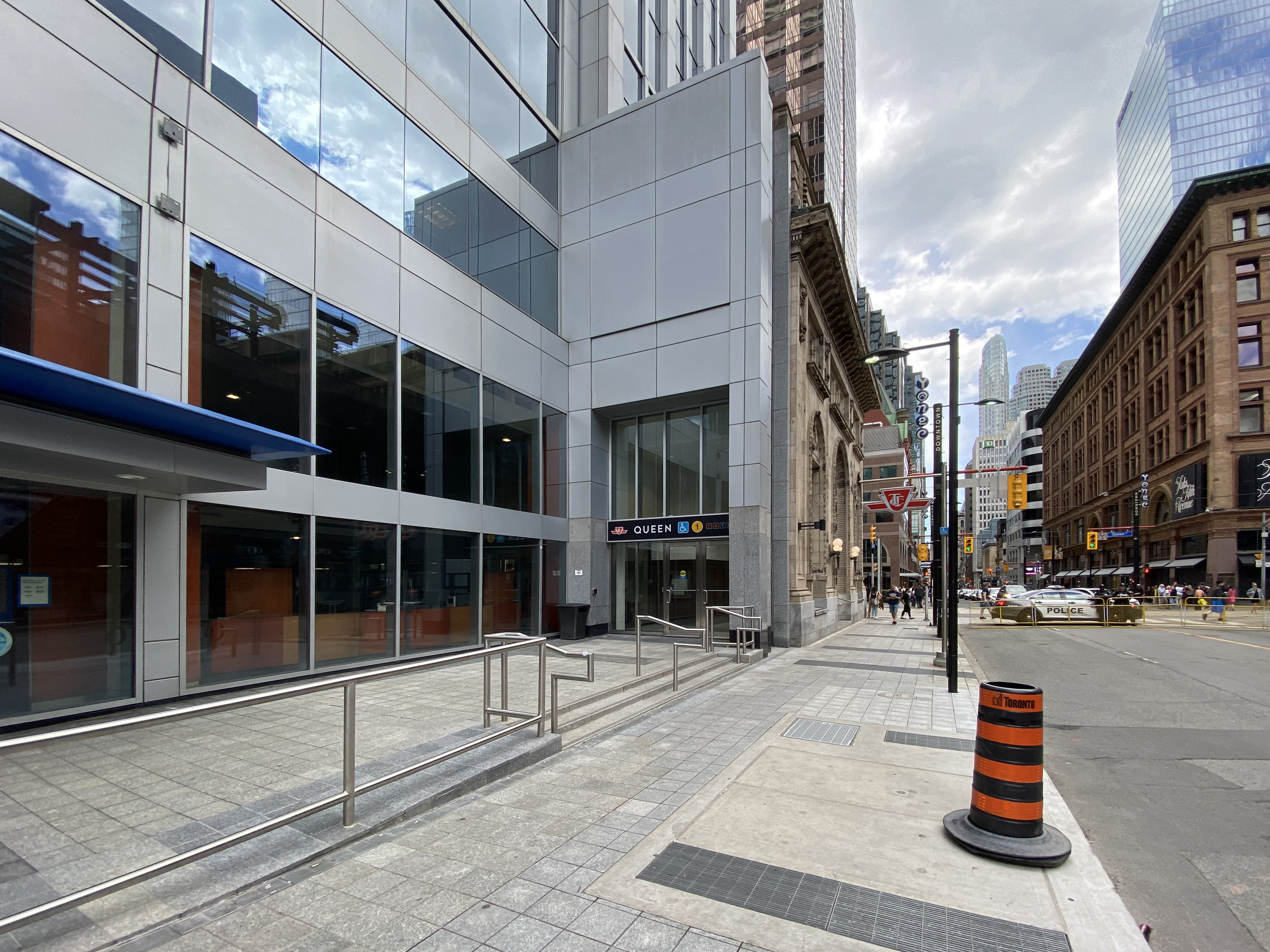
Entrance on the north side of the Maritime Life Tower is the designated Wheel-Trans pick up location

The station lies under Yonge Street north of Queen Street to Shuter Street. The station has seven entrances from street level, which includes accessible entrances from inside the Eaton Centre and the Maritime Life Tower. Other entrances include a sidewalk staircase entrance from Shuter Street, and other entrances from 1 Queen Street East, 8 Queen Street West, by Hudson's Bay Queen Street, and from the north entrance outside the Eaton Centre.

Below street level are the concourses, with one above and across the north end of the platforms and at the south there is one on each side at track level with an underpass to connect them.

The only tenant in the station is Gateway Newstands, and there is one located on both platforms inside the fare-paid area.

== Architecture and art ==
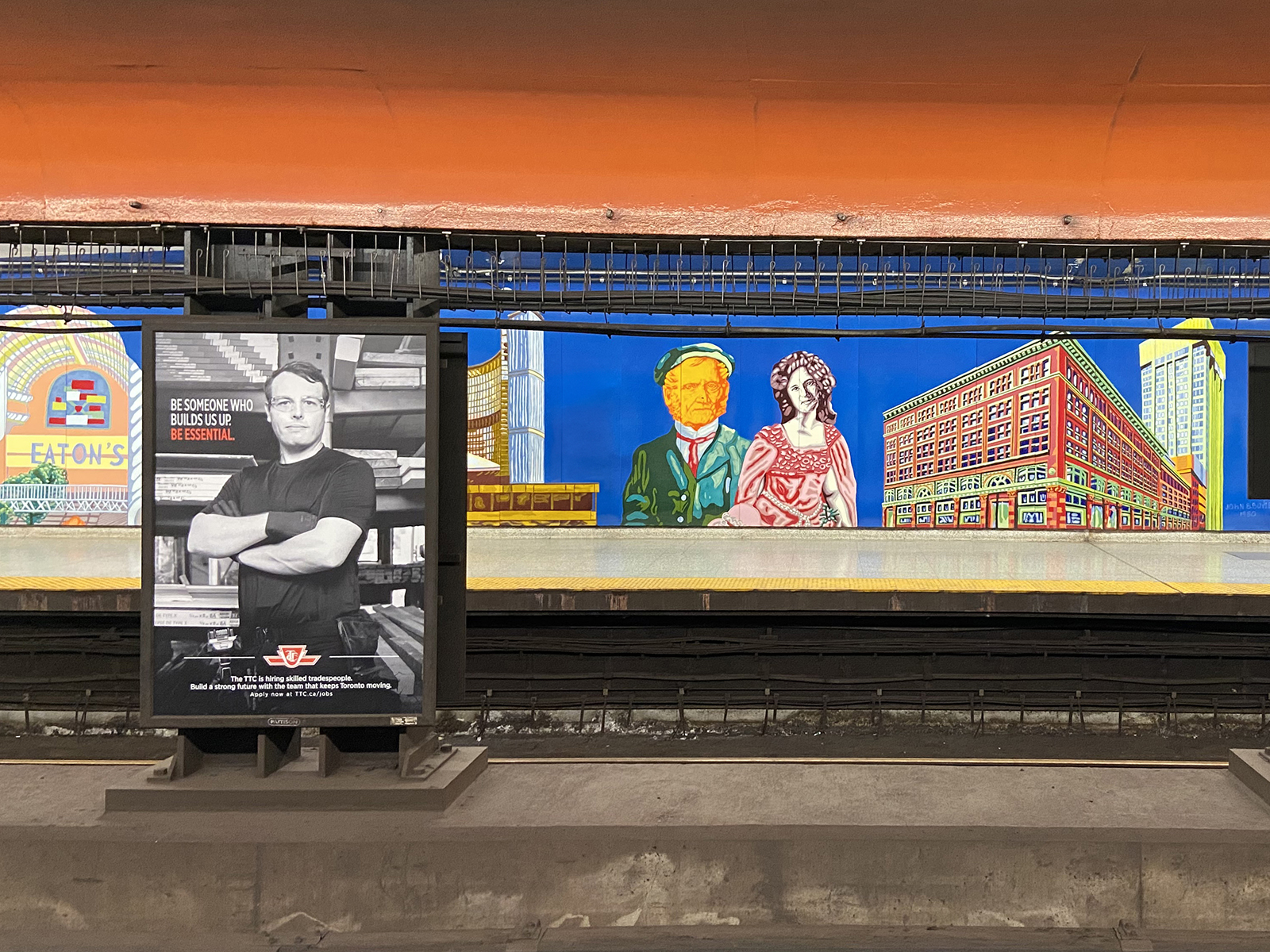
Our Nell by John Boyle

The station contains painted murals by John Boyle at the platform level entitled Our Nell, featuring depictions of Nellie McClung, William Lyon Mackenzie, as well as the former Simpson's and Eaton's department stores.

== Nearby landmarks ==
Nearby landmarks include the former Hudson's Bay Company Queen Street store, the south end of the Eaton Centre, the Old City Hall courts, Nathan Phillips Square, Toronto City Hall, the Elgin and Winter Garden Theatres, and Massey Hall.

== Surface connections ==
A transfer is required to connect between the subway system and these surface routes:

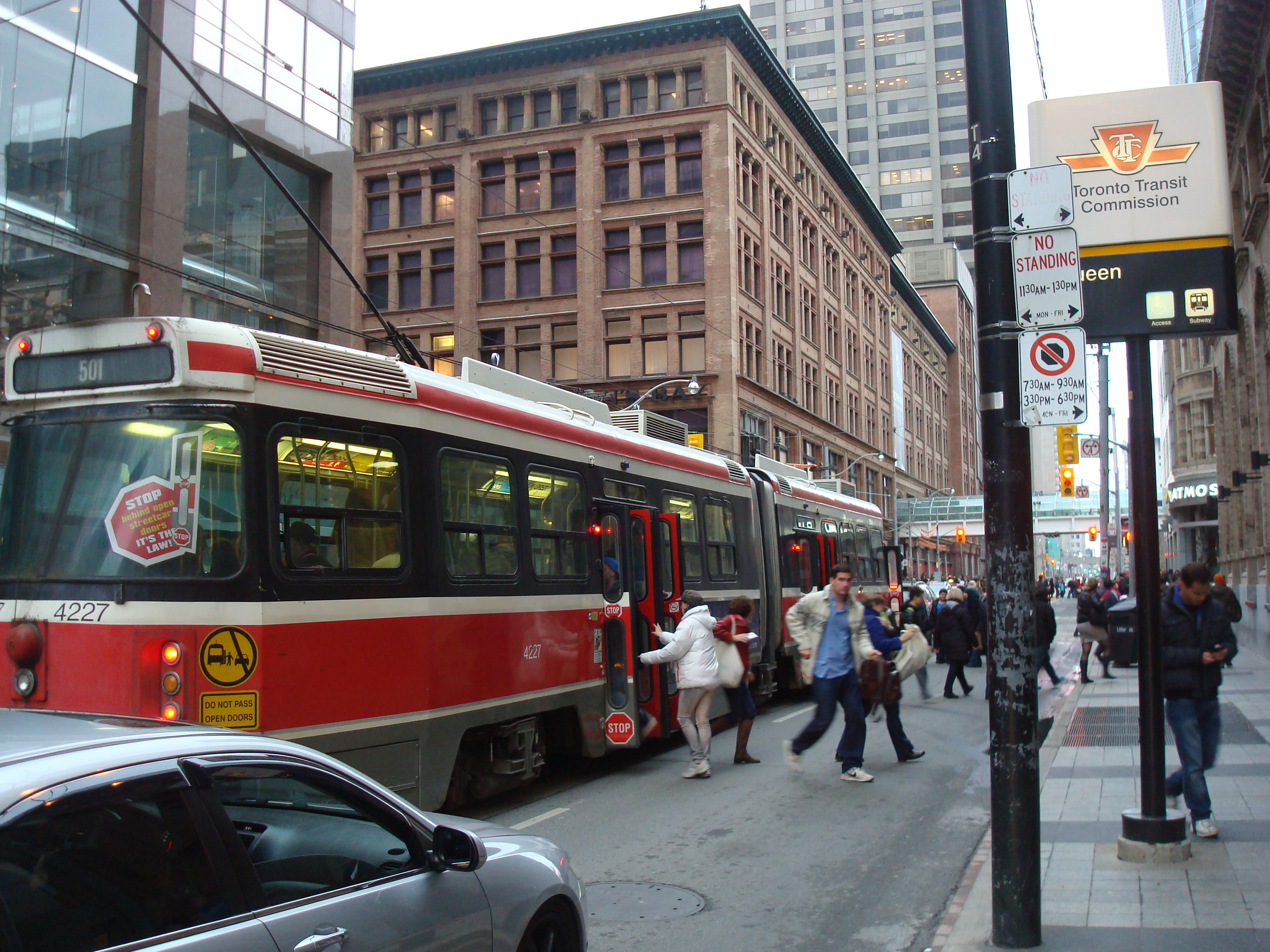
A 501 Queen streetcar stops outside the station entrance.

TTC routes serving the station include:

Route	Name	Additional information
97C	Yonge	Northbound to Eglinton station and southbound to Union station (Rush hour service)
320	Yonge	Blue Night service; northbound to Steeles Avenue and southbound to Queens Quay
501/301	Queen	Streetcar; eastbound to Neville Park Loop and westbound to Humber Loop (or Long Branch for late-evening trips)

== Ontario Line ==
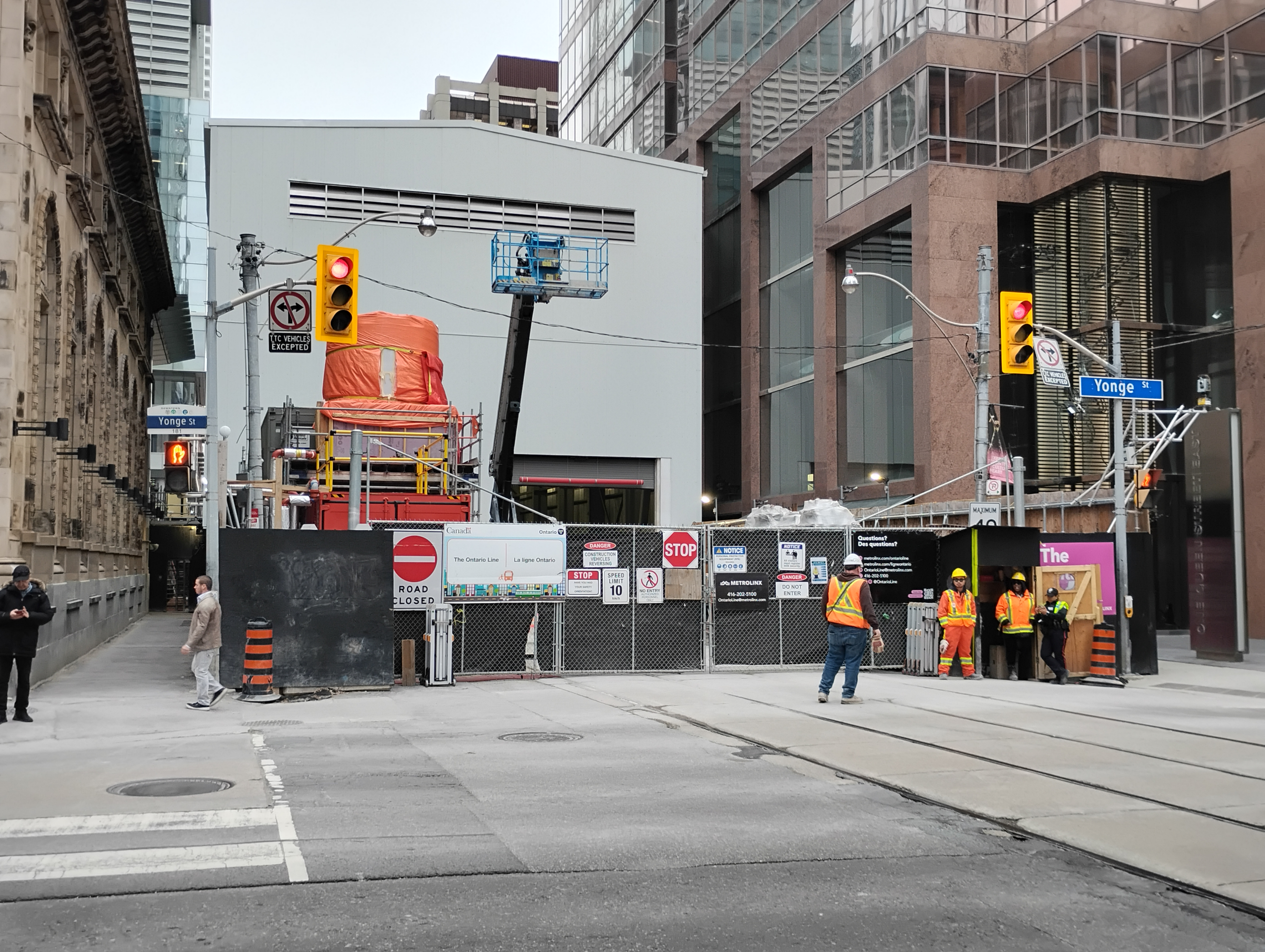
Yonge and Queen Streets closed for Ontario Line construction at Queen station in April 2026, with an acoustic shelter to reduce noise

By early 2023, construction had begun on the Ontario Line, a rapid transit line connecting the downtown loop of Line 1 Yonge–University to the eastern portion of Line 2 Bloor–Danforth at Pape station, then extending north to Don Valley station, where the line will interchange with Line 5 Eglinton. From Queen station, the line will also travel west to Exhibition. The section that was roughed-in for Lower Queen station will be modified and used to facilitate passenger transfers between Line 1 and the new line. The Ontario Line segment of the station is being drilled out of rock below the level of the existing Line 1 station.

== See also ==
- Queen Street subway
