= Graffiti Alley, Baltimore =

Alley in Baltimore, Maryland, USA

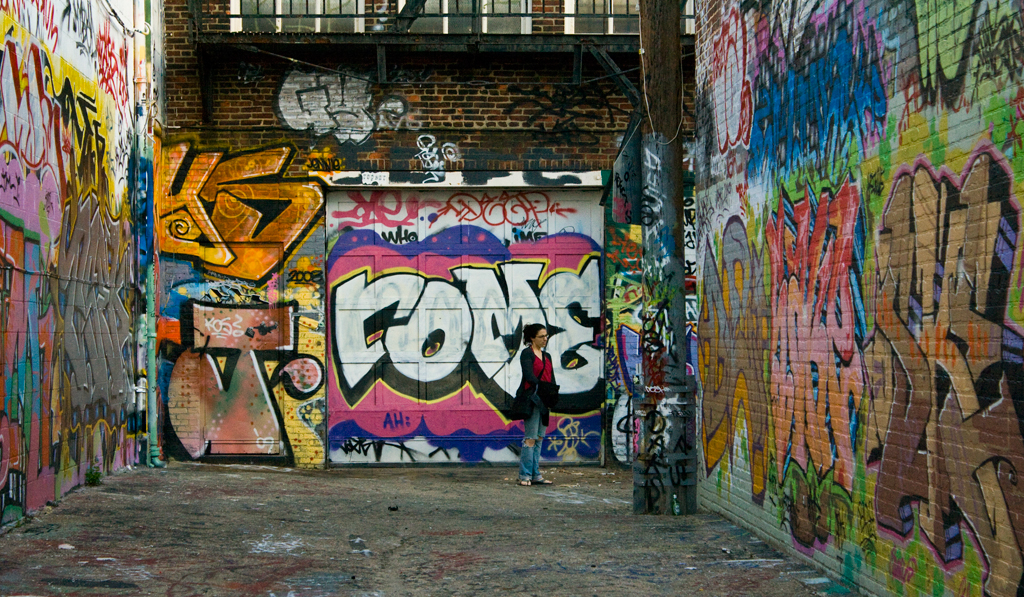

Graffiti Alley Baltimore, also known as Graffiti Alley, is an urban art venue situated in the Station North Arts and Entertainment District of Baltimore, Maryland, USA. The alley provides an open and legal platform for graffiti art.

== History ==
Graffiti Alley in Baltimore was initially an overlooked urban area. In 1995 local artists initiated the process of turning the blank walls into canvases for graffiti. This process was formalized in 2005 when Sherwin Mark, owner of one of the three commercial structures forming the alley's walls – successfully advocated for the alley's designation as a legal spot for graffiti. This development significantly reduced the instances of graffiti-related prosecution.

Graffiti Alley has now become a local landmark and tourist attraction
