= Rick Mercer Report =

Television series

- Rick Mercer Report main title
- Also known as: Rick Mercer's Monday Report (2004–2006)
- Created by: Rick Mercer; Gerald Lunz
- Presented by: Rick Mercer
- Country of origin: Canada
- No. of seasons: 15
- No. of episodes: 255

Production
- Production locations: Canadian Broadcasting Centre; Toronto, Ontario
- Running time: 22–23 minutes

Original release
- Network: CBC Television
- Release: January 12, 2004 – April 10, 2018

Rick Mercer Report (also called the Mercer Report or RMR) is a Canadian television comedy series that aired on CBC Television from 2004 to 2018. Launched as Rick Mercer's Monday Report, or simply Monday Report, by comedian Rick Mercer, the weekly half-hour show combined news parody, sketch comedy, visits to interesting places across Canada, and satirical editorials, often involving Canadian politics. The show's format was similar in some respects to satirical news shows like Mercer's prior series, This Hour Has 22 Minutes.

The first two seasons aired on Monday nights, and aired its remaining seasons Tuesday nights at 8:00 p.m. on CBC. The program was recorded in front of a live audience at the Canadian Broadcasting Centre in Toronto, Ontario, except for the on-location and rant segments. These segments were shown to the studio audience during taping, with their reactions recorded for broadcast.

In September 2017, Mercer announced that the show would conclude on April 10, 2018, after a total of 15 seasons.

== Segments ==
- Monologue – At the beginning of each show, Mercer delivers a brief monologue. In the earliest episodes this was similar to a late-night talk show monologue, with Mercer joking about Canadian politics. In more recent seasons, the opening monologue has been rarely more than an outline of the on-location segments to come, punctuated with a related joke or two.
- On-location – On each programme Mercer travels to one or more different parts of Canada, often to communities that are currently in the news or celebrating some event, and collects opinions, reactions, and quotes from people on the street. Often Mercer will participate in some demonstration related to the location (e.g. driving a TTC bus while visiting the agency's bus compound), with comic results. Two on-location segments (sometimes different locations in the same area, sometimes two distant locations; occasionally one may be a direct continuation of the other) appear in a typical episode.
- Ad spoofs – Mercer does a parody ad, often spoofing a real one. Usually appears at least once per episode, right before a commercial break.
- "The Front Page" – Mercer makes comical comments on certain photos of famous people in the world. Normally seen at the start of segment 2.
- Rant – Mercer does a 'streeter'-style tongue-in-cheek monologue about current issues, using the same format that he popularized on 22 Minutes with a long take and camera tilting; the main variation is that his old 22 Minutes rants were filmed in black and white, while his RMR rants are filmed in colour. These are almost always taped while Mercer walks up and down Rush Lane, a graffiti-strewn Toronto alleyway. Usually used to begin segment 3.
- "Newsdesk" – Additional topical jokes, similar to the newsdesk segments on 22 Minutes, are sometimes seen in the latter part of the programme to pad time.
- Conclusion – During the brief final segment, Mercer invites the audience to visit his website with his blog, video clips and photo challenge. He then mentioned a local event happening in a (usually) small town somewhere in Canada. In early seasons, this is also where Mercer would give updates on the monthly contest.

=== Recurring ===
- "Celebrity Tip" — A Canadian celebrity gives how-to advice to the audience, such as Geddy Lee showing viewers how to properly ride a toboggan, Shirley Douglas demonstrating how to boost a car's battery, Pierre Berton demonstrating how to roll a joint or Conrad Black demonstrating how to wax a maple leaf. The humour in this segment often comes from the juxtaposition between the celebrity and their ability to demonstrate something the viewing public might not have expected them to know how to do.
- "Monitor Piece" — Occasionally Mercer will perform a "lecture"-type monologue in-studio, usually standing next to a TV screen and waving a metal pointer, attempting to explain a complicated issue or point out the absurdity of a particular policy. Typically the piece will end with an instrumental version of "O Canada" playing in the background. This is a continuation of a sketch style Mercer also used from time to time on 22 Minutes, most famously for the Stockwell Day/Doris Day petition sketch.

=== Discontinued ===
- "Daryn Jones" — Correspondent Daryn Jones goes out and checks out cool things. This segment was discontinued in Season 3, with Jones leaving the show for MTV Canada.
- Contest — Early seasons featured a monthly contest in which viewers were encouraged to send in pictures. Mercer would show these pictures at the conclusion of the show throughout the month, and declare the winner on the final show of the month. Some examples include "Canada's Biggest Pothole" or "Canada's Best Shed." The prize was usually a free trip to Toronto to attend a taping of the show.

== Production details ==
Rick Mercer Report was produced by Island Edge Inc and the CBC. The show was produced in HD beginning in its third season. Reruns of the program air on The Comedy Network and CBC Television.

== Set interior ==
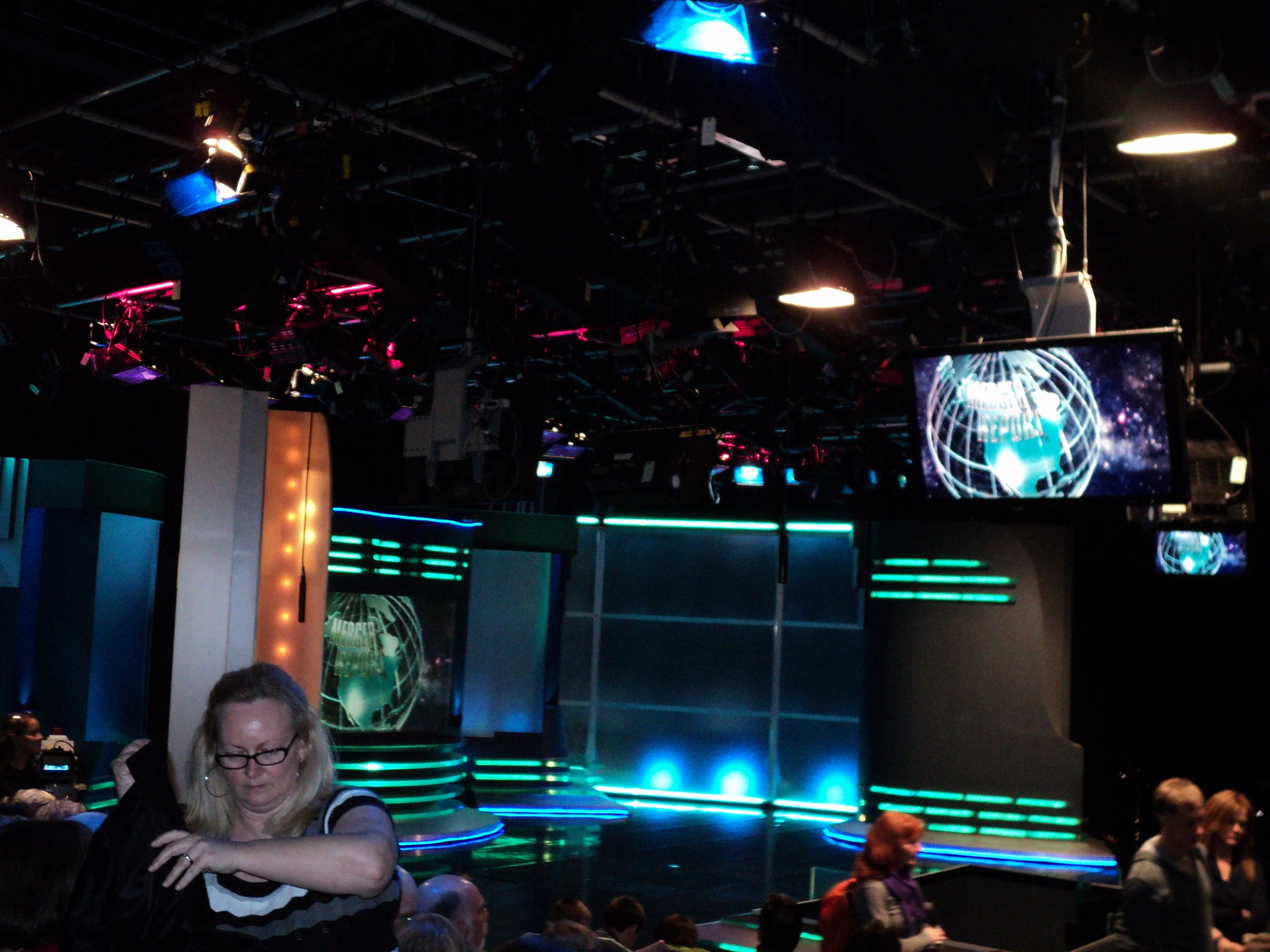
Set of the Rick Mercer Report before filming of an episode in 2011

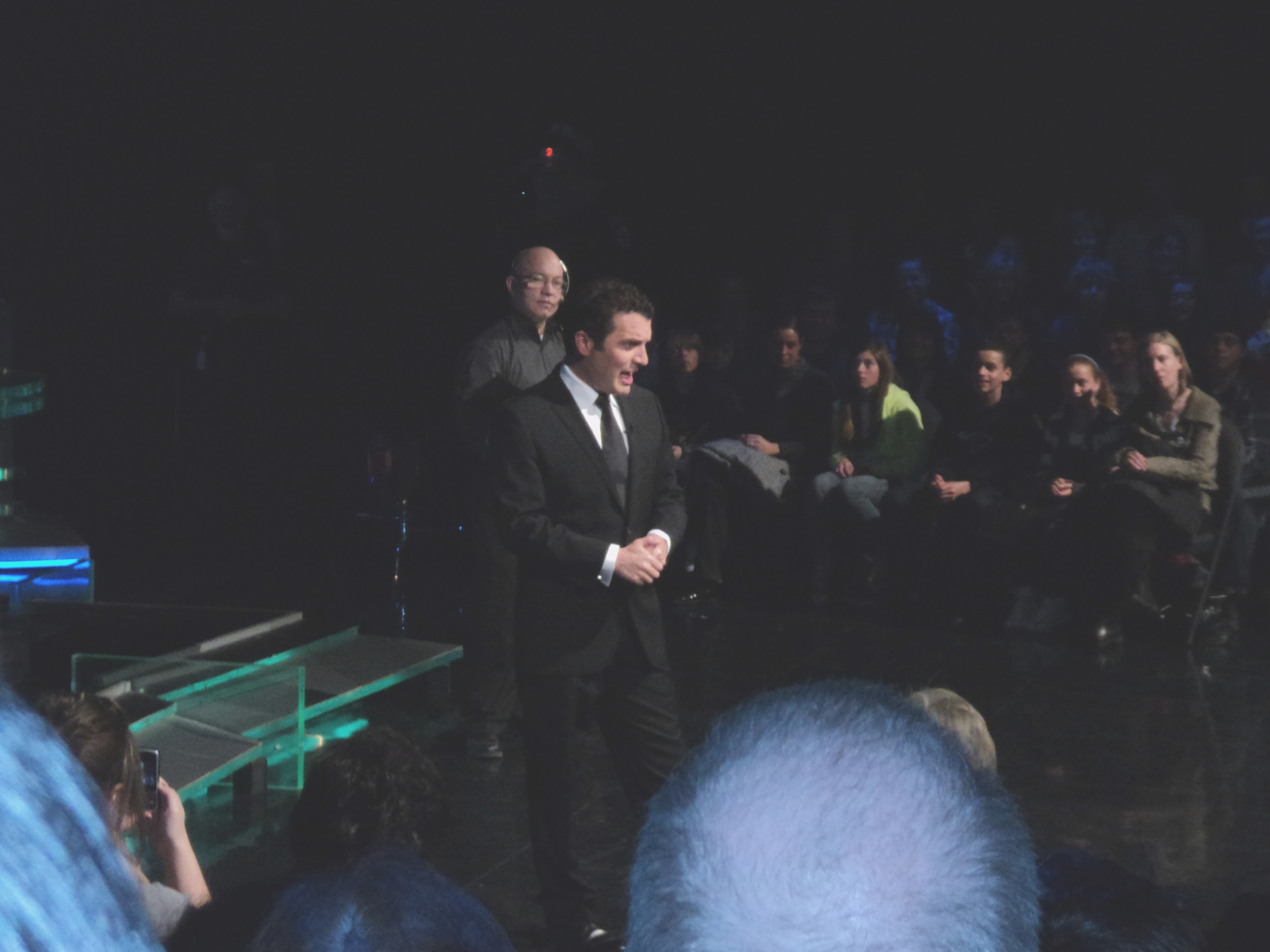
Mercer in March 2011 during a taping of the Mercer Report
