= Osgoode station =

Toronto subway station

Osgoode
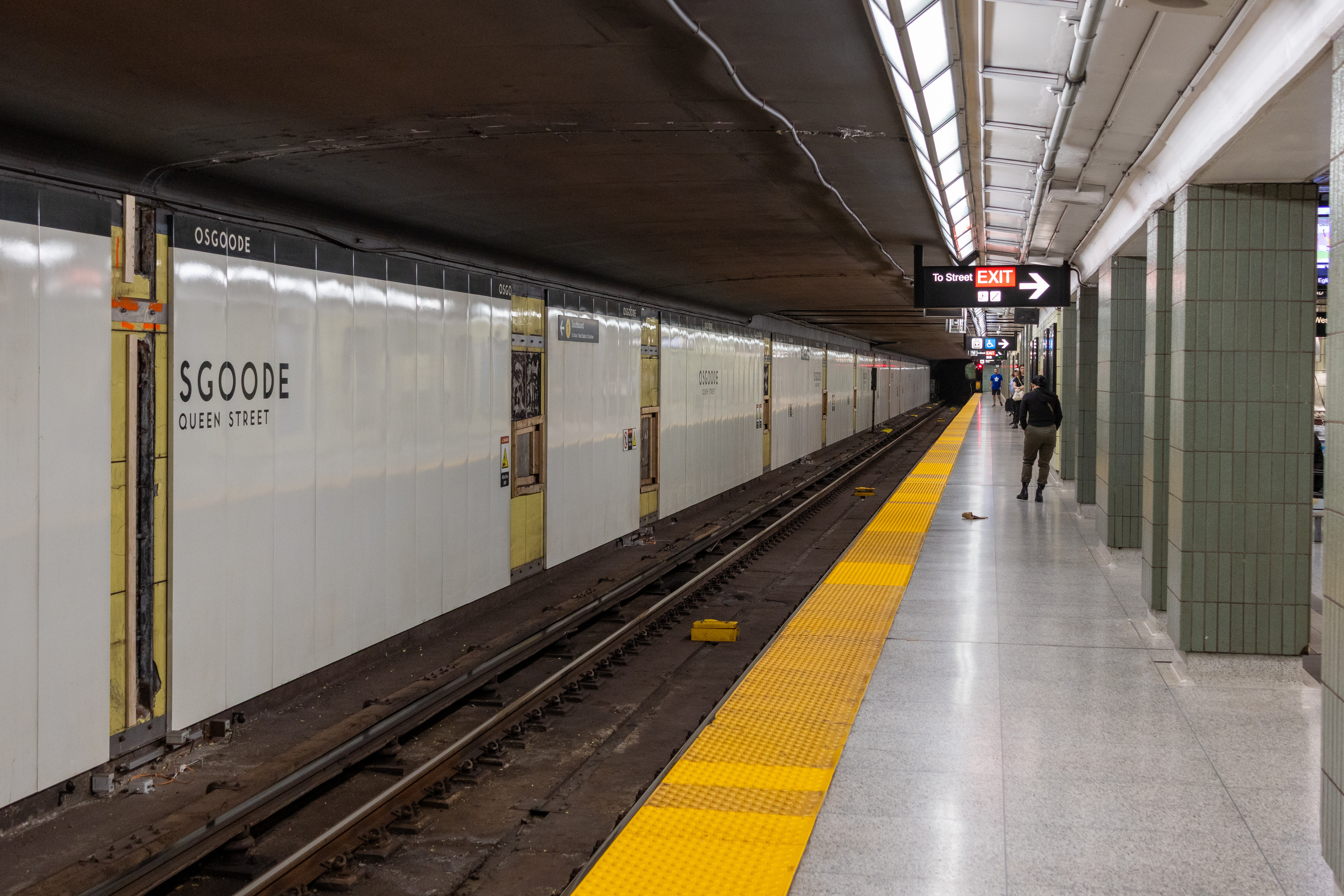

General information
- Location: 181 Queen Street West; Toronto, Ontario; Canada
- Coordinates: 43°39′03″N 79°23′12″W
- Owner: Toronto Transit Commission
- Platforms: Centre platform
- Tracks: 2
- Connections: TTC buses and Streetcars: 301 Queen; 501 Queen

Construction
- Structure type: Underground
- Accessible: Yes

Other information
- Website: Official station page

History
- Opened: February 28, 1963; 63 years ago
- Rebuilt: 2006–2008, 2016

Passengers
- 2023–2024: 19,323
- Rank: 38 of 70

Services
Preceding station	Toronto Transit Commission	Following station
St. Patrick towards Vaughan	Line 1 Yonge–University	St. Andrew towards Finch
Future services
Preceding station	Toronto Transit Commission	Following station
Chinatown towards Exhibition	Ontario Line (opens 2030s)	Queen towards Don Valley
Location

Osgoode is a subway station on Line 1 Yonge–University in Toronto, Ontario, Canada. The station, which opened in 1963, is located under University Avenue where it is crossed by Queen Street West and is named for the nearby Osgoode Hall, which honours William Osgoode, the first chief justice of Upper Canada.

== History and construction ==
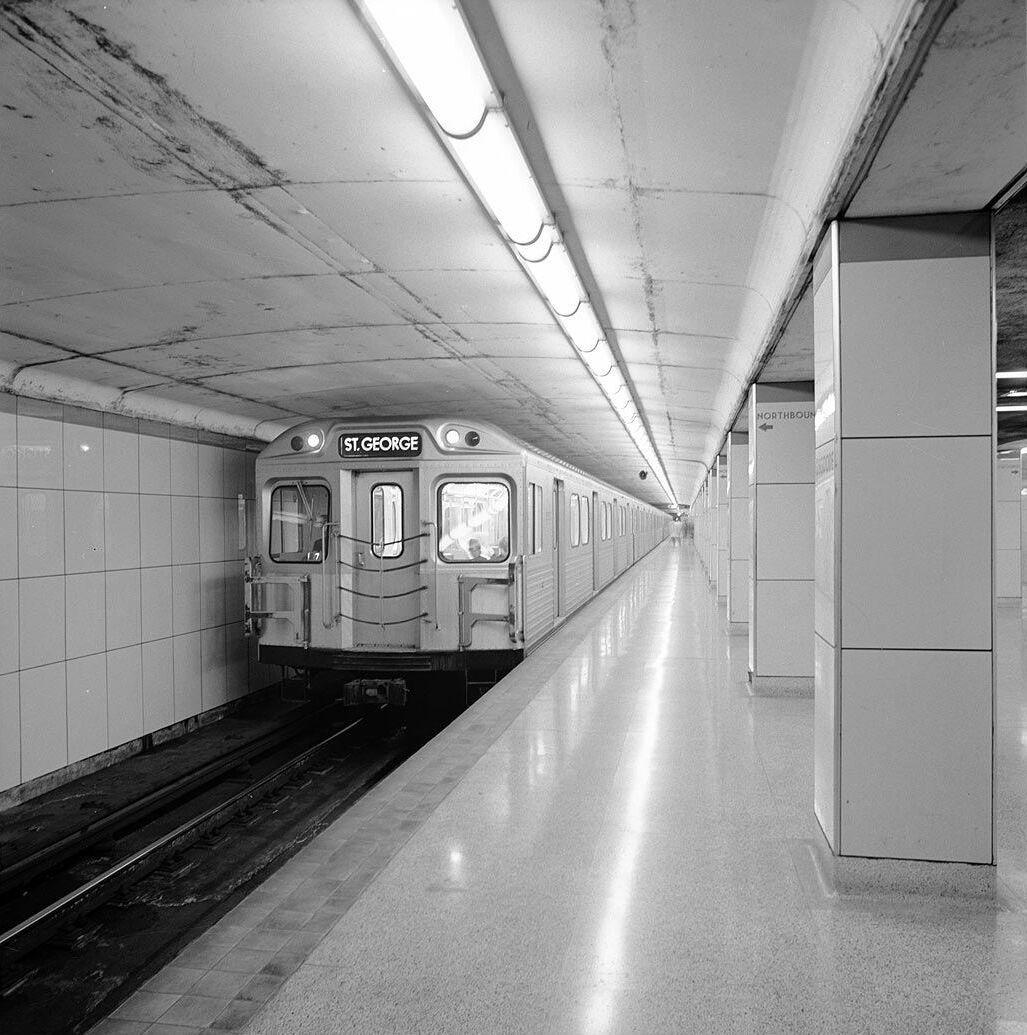
The original 1963 platform tiles

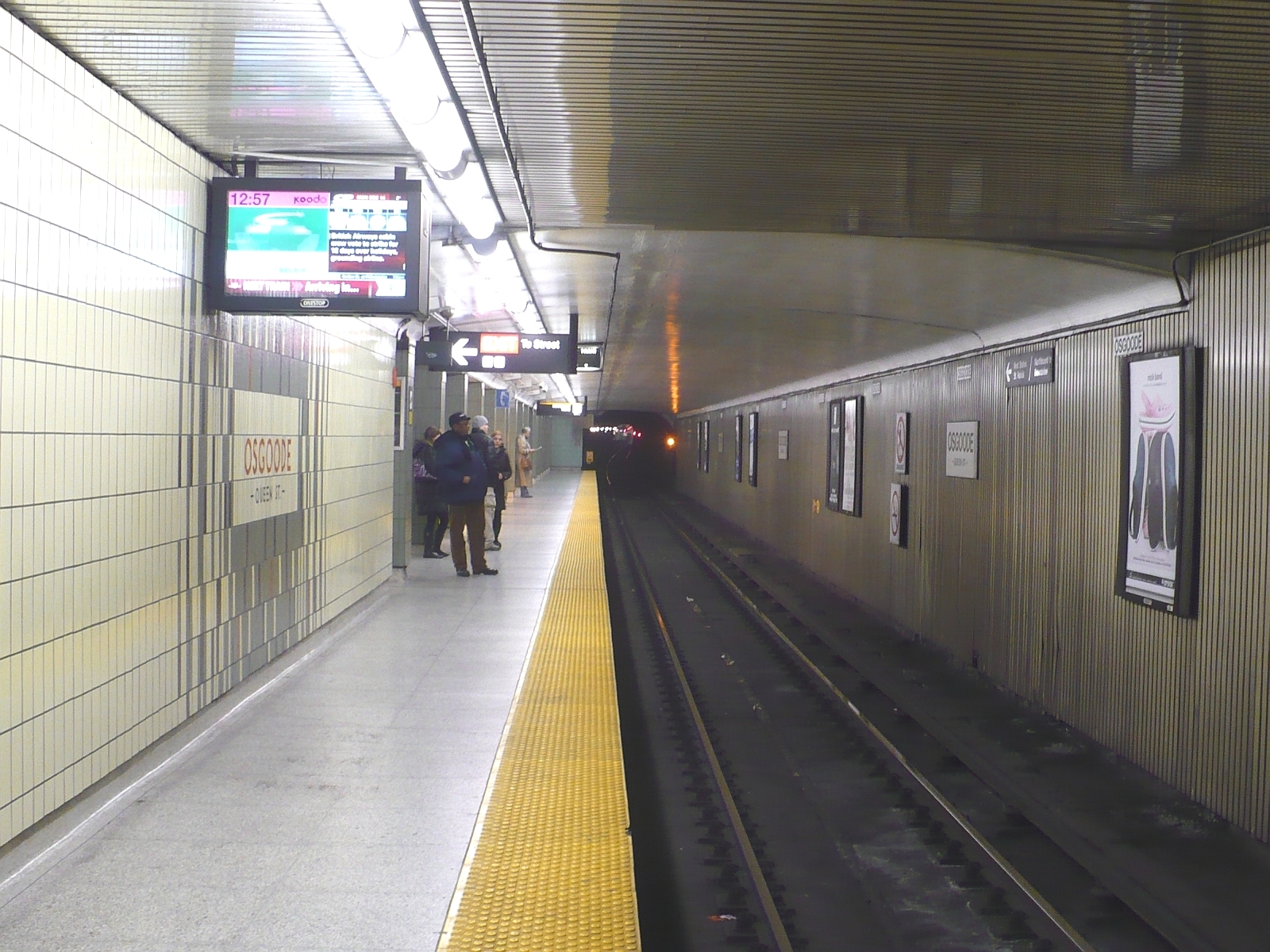
The intermediate 1970s tiles and vertical-slat cladding

The station has an island platform and was constructed using the cut-and-cover method. There is a pocket track at the south end of the station which allows a southbound train to change direction.

When Osgoode was built, some utility lines were relocated away from the station to allow for a future "Lower Osgoode" station on the projected but never-built Queen Street subway, but unlike at Lower Queen, no actual construction took place. When it opened, Osgoode, like St. Andrew and the stations on the Yonge line, had Vitrolite tiles on its walls. Cracks resulting from the high water table at the station forced the TTC to cover over these tiles in the 1970s with coloured vertical slats along the outer trackside walls and closely matched ceramic tiles on structural elements on the platform itself. In 2016, the slats were replaced in turn by off-white panels, evoking the original design.

Entrances to the station were all built as open stairways from the sidewalk, with the panel above the lintel emblazoned with the scales of justice, which referenced the Superior Court of Justice at Osgoode Hall. Subsequent refurbishment resulted in a generic TTC style replacing the unique symbolism. In 2006, a new entrance, with elevator access to the concourse level, was integrated into the construction of the Four Seasons Centre, at the southeast corner of Queen and University. Along with an elevator to the platform level within the fare paid area, this made the station fully accessible as of 2007. Plans from 2008 call for Diamond and Schmitt Architects, who were responsible for the opera house, to design complementary covered entrances at the other three corners of the intersection.

Entrances

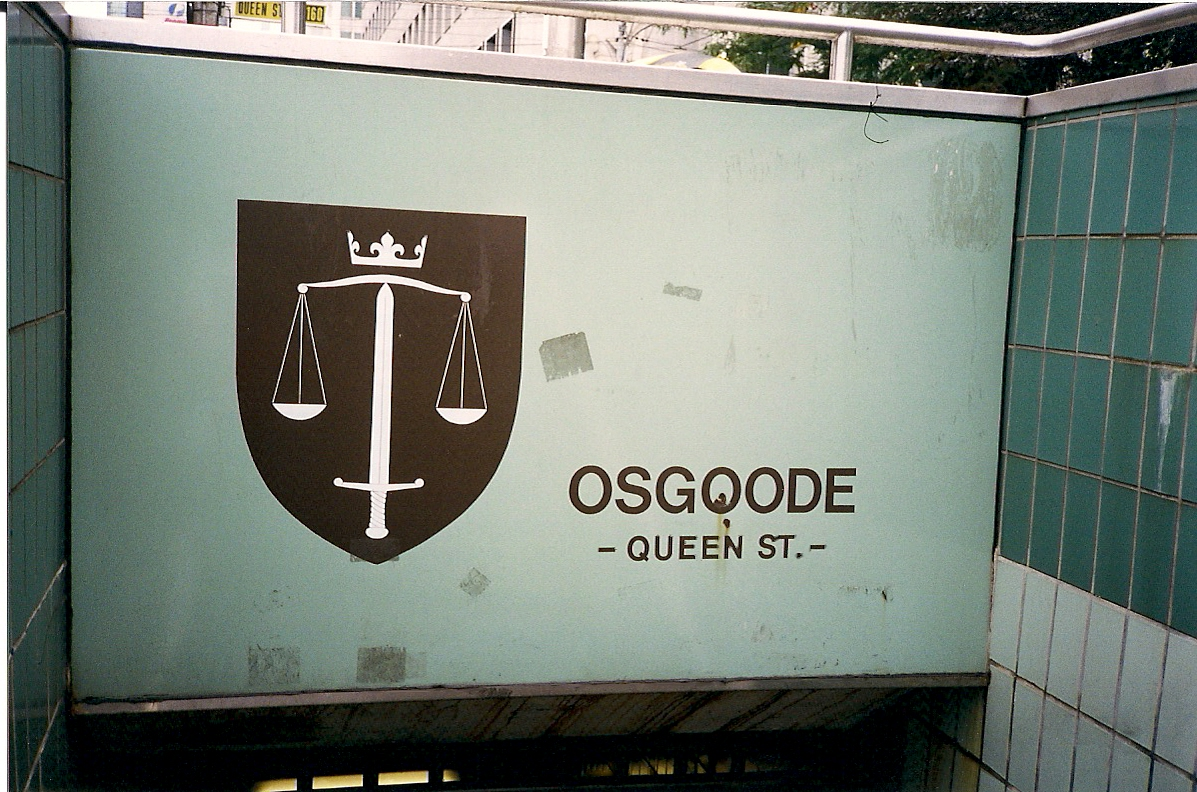
Original design of entrance stairwell

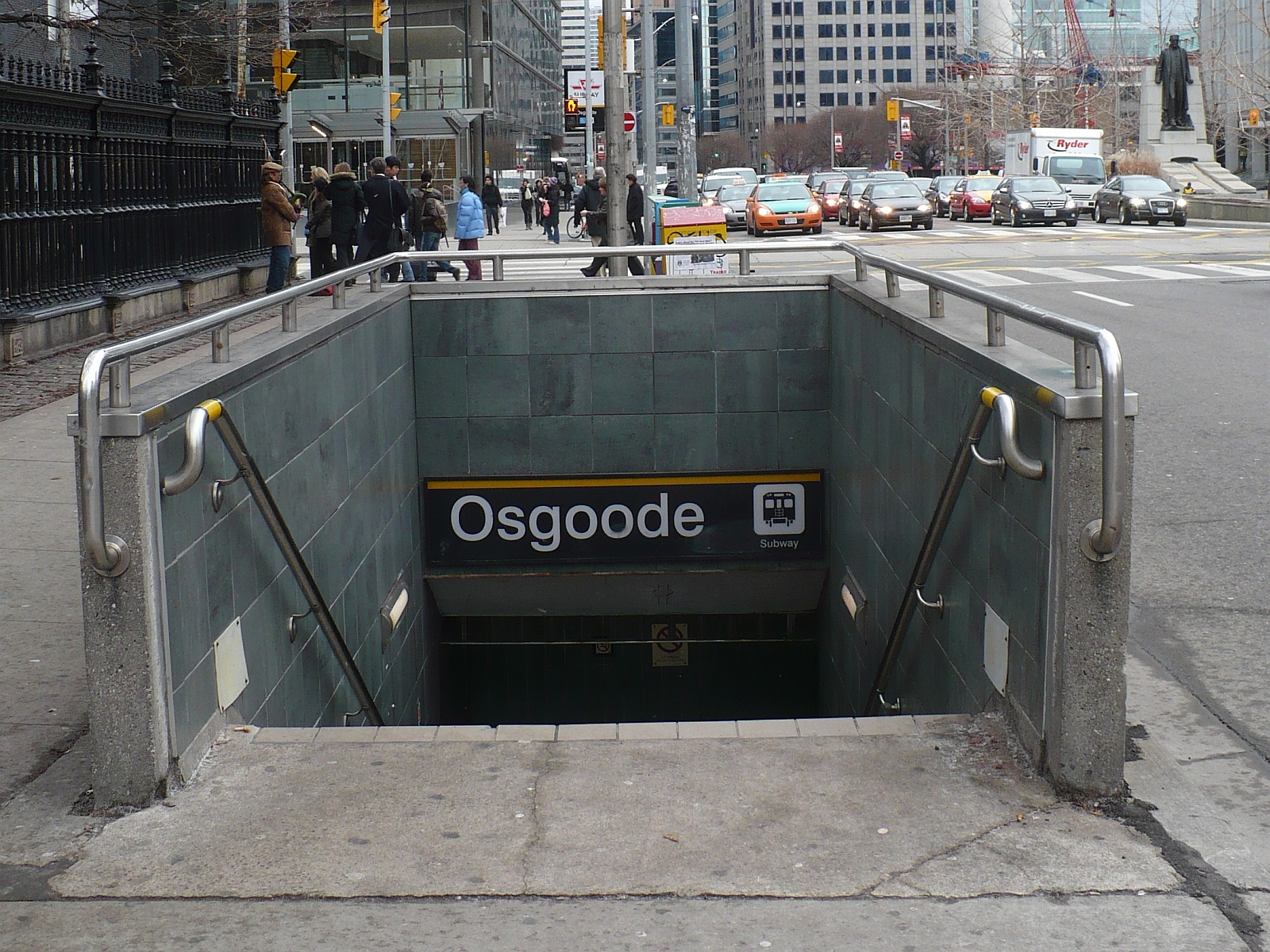
Current stairs with generic TTC signage

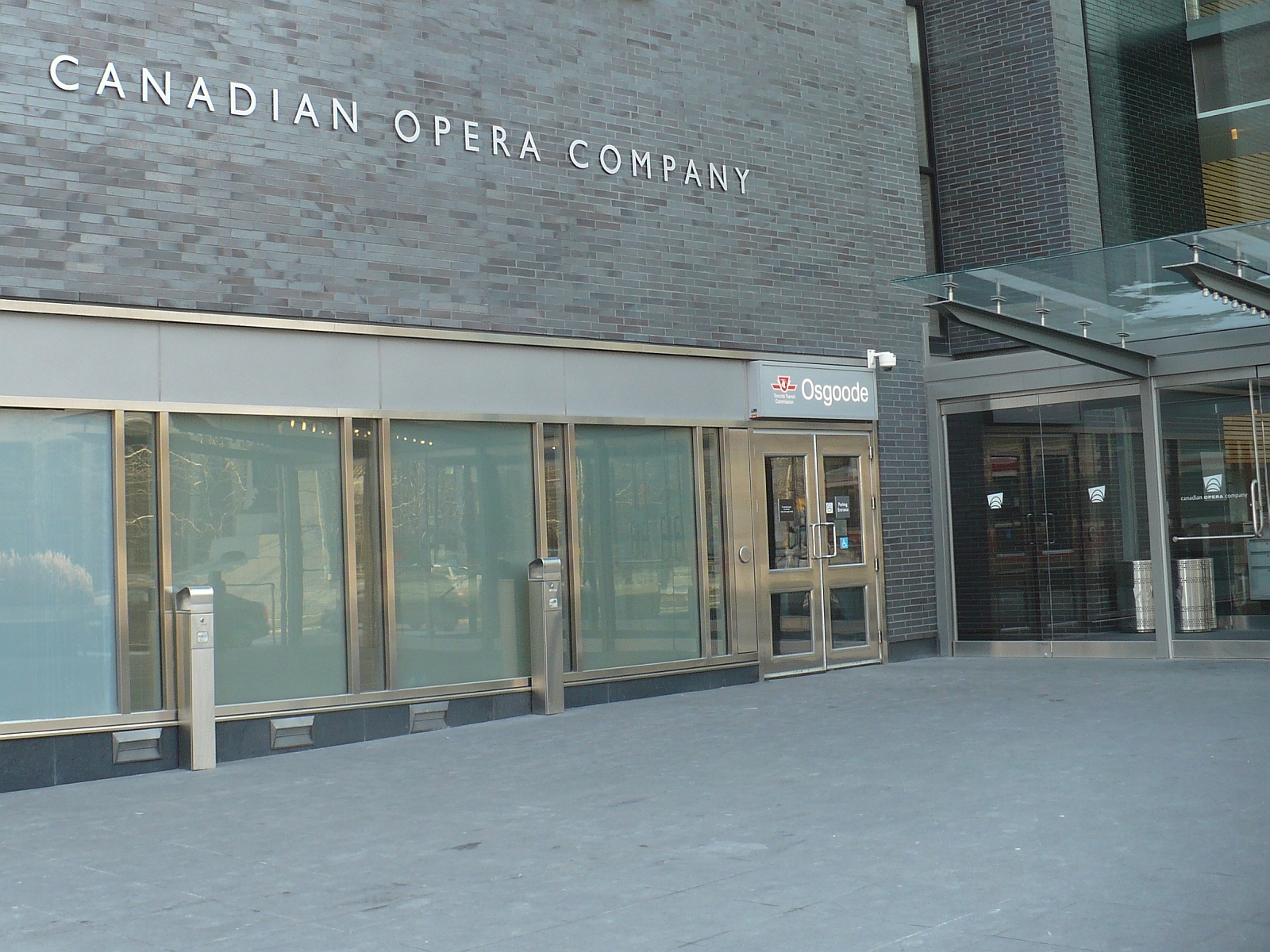
Four Seasons Centre subway entrance

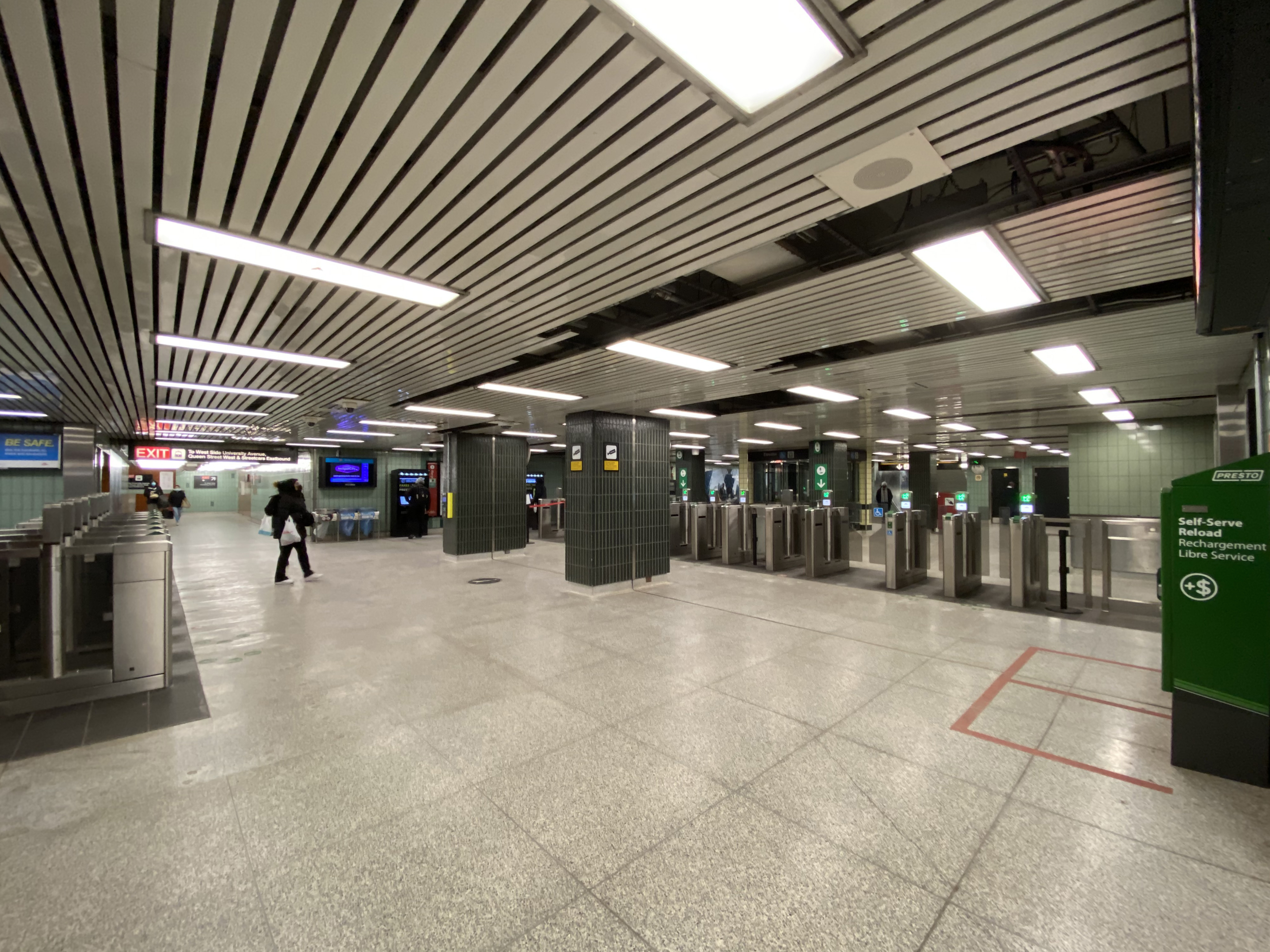
Station concourse

== Ontario Line ==
By early 2023, construction had begun on the Ontario Line, a rapid transit line connecting the south loop of Line 1 Yonge–University to the east wing of Line 2 Bloor–Danforth, then extending north to Don Valley station, where the line will interchange with Line 5 Eglinton. From Osgoode station, the line will also travel west to Exhibition. At Osgoode, the Ontario Line segment of the station will be drilled out of rock at a lower level than the existing Line 1 infrastructure.

== Nearby landmarks ==
Nearby landmarks include the Four Seasons Centre for the Performing Arts, Toronto City Hall, Nathan Phillips Square, Osgoode Hall, the South African War Memorial, 299 Queen Street West, the Canada Life Building and the United States Consulate.

== Surface connections ==
A transfer is required to connect between the subway system and these surface routes:

TTC routes serving the station include:

Route	Name	Additional information
501/301	Queen	Streetcar; eastbound to Neville Park Loop and westbound to Humber Loop (or Long Branch Loop for late-evening services).
