= BAI Communications =

Australian telecommunications systems company

- Formerly: Broadcast Australia
- Industry: Telecommunications
- Predecessor: National Transmission Agency
- Founded: 2002; 24 years ago
- Headquarters: Sydney, Australia
- Area served: Global
- Parent: CPP Investment Board (86%); Aimco; Kindle Capital
- Website: www.baicommunications.com

BAI Communications, formerly Broadcast Australia, is an Australian telecommunications systems company.

== History ==
Macquarie Bank completed its acquisition of National Transmission Agency in 2002 – the seed asset in the publicly listed Macquarie Communications Infrastructure Group (MCIG) fund – and rebranded it as Broadcast Australia. The MCIG fund, including Broadcast Australia, was acquired by the Canada Pension Plan Investment Board in 2009.

In November 2019, Broadcast Australia was rebranded BAI Communications.

In March 2023, BAI announced they would rebrand in the northern hemisphere to Boldyn Networks from at the end of June 2023.

== Operations and acquisitions ==
BAI Communications has funded a number of initiatives, for example:

- Transit Wireless, a telecommunications specializing in distributed antenna system networks to provide coverage in the places that are unreachable by traditional cellular phone services
- Broadcast Australia are under contract to maintain the digital radio infrastructure for all Brisbane radio stations
- Digital transmission service provider for Television Sydney
- Transmission services for SBS Radio
- A three-year trial in Sydney extended to six-years of a datacasting service using the DVB-T system for use in Australia, Digital Forty Four
- Transmission services for Southern Cross Austereo
- BAI also operates in Canada, most notably for the Toronto subway system for its wireless services. On April 10, 2023, Rogers Communications announced the acquisition of BAI Communications' Canadian assets, bringing the 5G network to the Toronto's subway network.
- In the United Kingdom, BAI provides the mobile coverage solution and public Wi-Fi on the London Underground

== Broadcast facilities ==
As at February 2022, BAI Communications operated 774 transmission sites across Australia.
