= National Transmission Agency =

Australian broadcasting agency, 1992–1997

The NTA's logo

The National Transmission Agency (NTA) was an agency within the Australian Department of Communications and the Arts that existed from its inception in 1992 until 1997. Its main function was to administer the transmissions of the Australian government's network of broadcasting stations.

== Beginnings ==
The NTA was established in July 1992 by the Australian government to supervise the operation of the National Transmission Network (NTN). The NTN was, and still is, the network of radio and television transmitters that broadcast the programs of Australia's national broadcasters, namely SBS and ABC. The NTA existed as a separate cost centre within the Department of Communications and the Arts because it was funded directly from the Department of Finance during its years of operation.

== Operations ==
Its function was to oversee various Australian government programs relating to the broadcasting of ABC and SBS television and radio programs within Australia and of ABC Radio Australia on shortwave internationally. This was done primarily through administering maintenance and equipment supply contracts. The NTA's funding agreement with the Department of Finance required it to meet savings and performance targets. It had to do this while maintaining the integrity and reliability of the transmission facilities themselves. During the life of the NTA, it moved from exclusive reliance on Broadcast Communications and Telstra towards a process of competitive tendering to provide its broadcasting services. A significant source of extra funding to the NTA was "site-sharing" of transmission facilities with commercial broadcasters, telecommunications companies and emergency service communication networks. This site-sharing meant that NTA facilities were made available in return for payment.

== Review and privatisation ==
The operational efficiency of the NTA was reviewed in 1995 and again in 1996 following a change of government in Australia. The Howard government chose to privatise the NTA in 1997. Macquarie Bank completed its acquisition of NTA in 2002 and re-branded it as Broadcast Australia.
