= Toronto subway =

Rapid transit system in Ontario, Canada

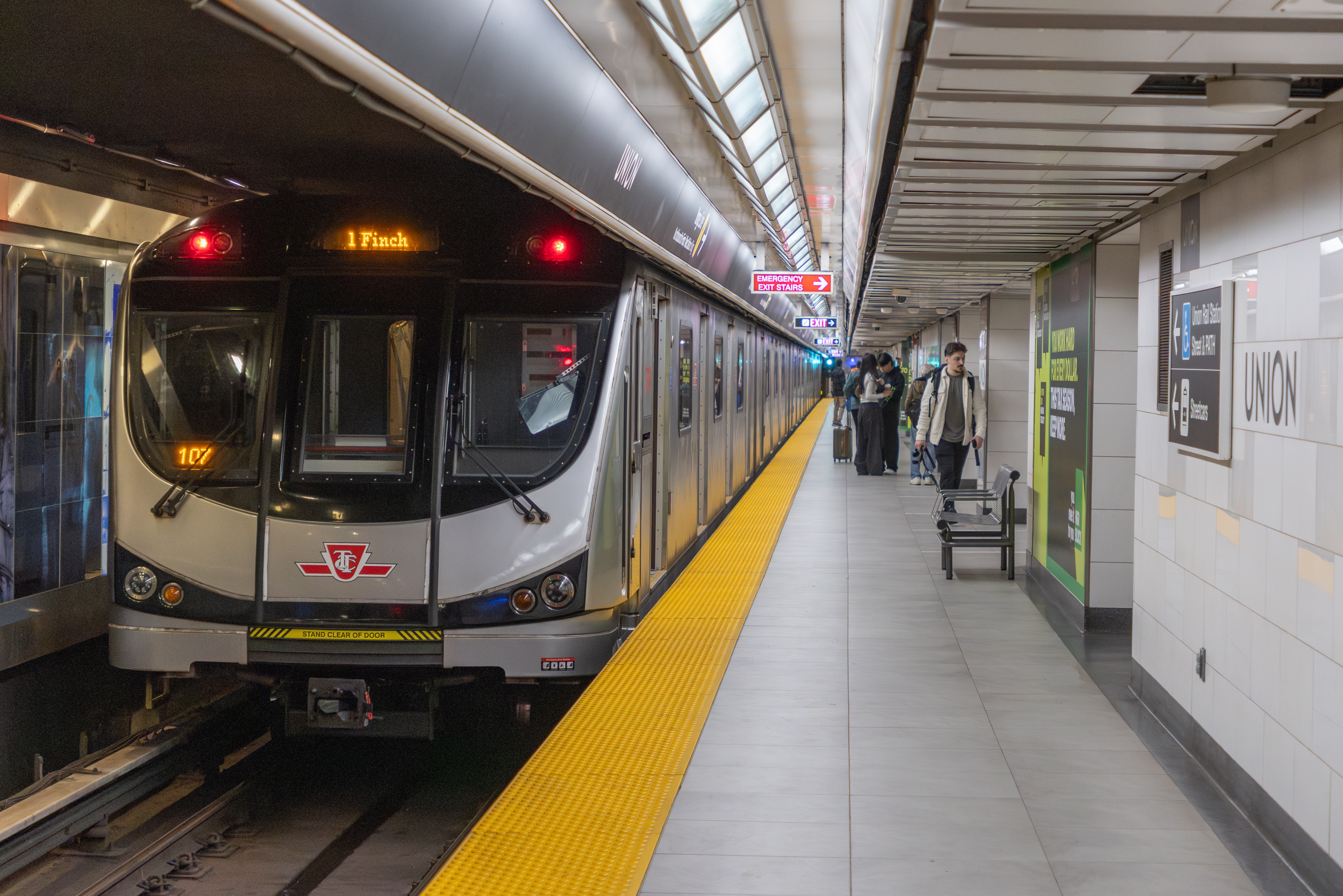
- A Toronto Rocket train at Union station on Line 1

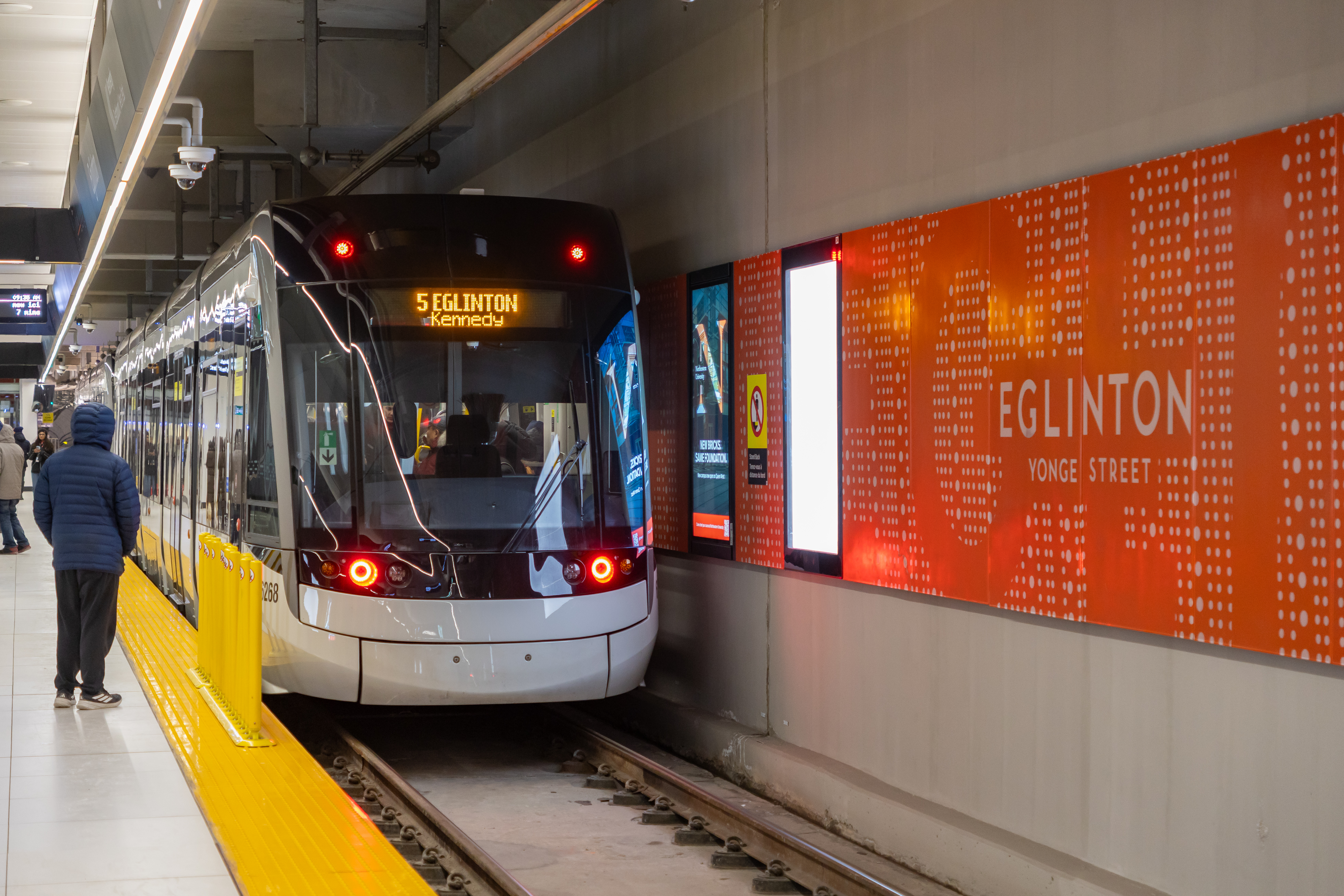
- A Flexity Freedom train at Eglinton station on Line 5

Overview
- Owner: Toronto Transit Commission (Lines 1, 2 and 4); Metrolinx (Lines 5 and 6)
- Area served: Greater Toronto
- Locale: Toronto, Ontario; Vaughan, Ontario
- Transit type: Rapid transit
- Number of lines: 5 (plus 1 under construction)
- Number of stations: 109 (plus 26 under construction)
- Daily ridership: 1,087,000 (weekdays, Q2 2026)
- Annual ridership: 331,789,000 (2025)

Operation
- Began operation: March 30, 1954; 72 years ago
- Operator: Toronto Transit Commission
- Number of vehicles: 830 heavy rail cars; 66 work cars
- Train length: 6 cars (Lines 1 and 2); 4 cars (Line 4); 2 cars (Line 5); 1 car (Line 6)
- Headway: 2 min 30 s – 5 min (Line 1); 2 min 20 s – 6 min (Line 2); 5 min 30 s (Line 4); 4 min 4 s – 12 min 40 s (Line 5); 6 min 32 s – 12 min 15 s (Line 6)

Technical
- System length: 100.1 km (62.2 mi) (33.2 km (20.6 mi) under construction)
- Track gauge: 1,495 mm (4 ft 10 7/8 in) Toronto gauge (Lines 1, 2 and 4); 1,435 mm (4 ft 8 1/2 in) standard gauge (Lines 5 and 6)
- Electrification: Third rail, 600 V DC (Lines 1, 2 and 4); Overhead line, 750 V DC (Lines 5 and 6)
System map
Key

The Toronto subway is a rapid transit system serving Toronto and the neighbouring city of Vaughan in Ontario, Canada. It is operated by the Toronto Transit Commission (TTC), an agency of the City of Toronto. The system is a rail network consisting of five lines: Line 1 Yonge–University, Line 2 Bloor–Danforth, Line 4 Sheppard, Line 5 Eglinton, and Line 6 Finch West.

In 1954, the TTC opened Canada's first subway line, then known as the "Yonge subway" and now part of Line 1, under Yonge Street between Union Station and Eglinton Avenue with 12 stations. As of 2026, the network encompasses 109 stations and 99.4 kilometres (61.8 mi) of route. In 2025, the system had a ridership of 331,789,000, or about 1,087,000 per weekday as of the second quarter of 2026, making it the busiest rapid transit system in Canada in terms of daily ridership. As of May 2026, there are 26 stations under construction as part of the Ontario Line and three extensions to existing lines.

== Lines ==
The lines of the Toronto subway system are known by both a number and a name. While each line is also assigned a colour, the colours are used only to visually distinguish them on maps and signage, not as names.

There are five operating rapid transit lines in Toronto:

- Line 1 Yonge–University
- Line 2 Bloor–Danforth
- Line 4 Sheppard
- Line 5 Eglinton
- Line 6 Finch West

One additional line is also under construction:

- Ontario Line

Line 1 Yonge–University is the longest and busiest rapid transit line in the system. It opened as the Yonge subway in 1954 with a length of 7.4 kilometres (4.6 mi) and since then has grown to a length of 38.8 kilometres (24.1 mi). The modern line is U-shaped, having two northern terminals – at Vaughan Metropolitan Centre and Finch – and its southern end at Union station in downtown Toronto. As of February 2026, an extension of Line 1 northwards to Richmond Hill is being procured, with five new stations and a planned opening date in the 2030s.

Line 2 Bloor–Danforth, opened in 1966, runs parallel to Bloor Street and Danforth Avenue between Kipling station in Etobicoke and Kennedy station in Scarborough. Construction on a three-stop extension of Line 2 northeastward from Kennedy station to Sheppard Avenue and McCowan via Scarborough City Centre began in 2021, with a planned opening date in the 2030s.

Line 4 Sheppard, opened in 2002, runs eastward under Sheppard Avenue East from Sheppard–Yonge station on Line 1 to Don Mills station; it is the shortest rapid transit line in Toronto at a length of 5.5 kilometres (3.4 mi) and the only one without any open sections.

Line 5 Eglinton is a 19-kilometre (12 mi) light rail line along Eglinton Avenue, running from Kennedy station in the east to Mount Dennis station in the west. The line has 25 stopping points, 15 of which are underground stations, with the remaining 10 being at-grade stops located in the road's median. Construction began in 2011, with completion of the project delayed several times. The line opened on February 8, 2026, at a cost of approximately $12 billion. An extension of Line 5 westwards for 9.2 kilometres (5.7 mi) to Renforth station is also under construction. The extension will have seven stations, four underground and two elevated. Construction began in 2022 and is scheduled for completion in the 2030s.

Line 6 Finch West, opened in 2025, runs westward at-grade in the median of Finch Avenue for 11 kilometres (6.8 mi) and 18 stops from Finch West station on Line 1 to Humber College station. It was the first light rail line to enter service as part of the rapid transit system; construction began in 2019, and the line opened on December 7, 2025.

As of February 2026, one new line is under construction:

- The Ontario Line will be a 15.6-kilometre (9.7 mi) underground rapid transit line from Exhibition station to Don Valley station that will provide the first east–west rapid transit line through the Financial District and the central downtown core. The project evolved from the long-planned Downtown Relief Line, first proposed in the mid-1980s. The line is scheduled for completion in 2031 at a cost of $17 to $19 billion. Upon opening, the plan is to reassign the "Line 3" moniker formerly used by Line 3 Scarborough to the Ontario Line.

Until July 2023, the TTC operated an elevated light metro service. Line 3 Scarborough, originally known as the Scarborough RT, was an elevated medium-capacity (light metro) rail line serving the city's eponymous suburban district. It opened in 1985, running from Kennedy station to McCowan station via Scarborough Centre. It was the only rapid transit line in Toronto to use the Intermediate Capacity Transit System (ICTS) technology. Because of maintenance difficulties (along with the Line 2 subway extension into Scarborough), Line 3 was to be decommissioned on November 19, 2023. However, it was decommissioned approximately four months early due to a derailment on July 24, 2023. Bus service replaced Line 3 and is scheduled to continue until the extension of Line 2 to McCowan Road and Sheppard Avenue via Scarborough City Centre opens in 2030.

== History ==
=== Timeline ===
List of line, extension, and station openings and closings of the Toronto subway
| Date | Event |
|---|---|
| March 30, 1954 | The Yonge subway opens from Eglinton to Union station. It runs under or near Yonge Street and is part of today's Line 1 Yonge–University. |
| February 28, 1963 | The University subway opens from Union station to St. George. It is an extension of the Yonge subway northwest under University Avenue. |
| February 25, 1966 | The Bloor–Danforth subway (now Line 2 Bloor–Danforth) opens from Keele to Woodbine. It runs under or near Bloor Street and Danforth Avenue. |
| May 10, 1968 | Bloor–Danforth subway extensions open west to Islington and east to Warden. |
| March 30, 1973 | A Yonge subway extension opens from Eglinton to York Mills. |
| March 29, 1974 | A further Yonge subway extension opens from York Mills to Finch. |
| January 28, 1978 | The Spadina subway, an extension of the University subway, opens from St. George to Wilson. The entire line is renamed the Yonge–University–Spadina subway. |
| November 21, 1980 | Bloor–Danforth subway extensions open west to Kipling and east to Kennedy. |
| March 22, 1985 | The Scarborough RT (later Line 3 Scarborough) opens from Kennedy to McCowan. |
| June 18, 1987 | North York Centre on the Yonge–University–Spadina subway opens. It is an infill station constructed between two existing stations, Sheppard (now Sheppard–Yonge) and Finch. |
| March 31, 1996 | A Spadina subway extension opens from Wilson to Downsview (now Sheppard West). |
| November 22, 2002 | The Sheppard subway (now Line 4 Sheppard) opens from Sheppard–Yonge to Don Mills. It runs under Sheppard Avenue East. |
| December 17, 2017 | Line 1's Toronto–York Spadina subway extension (TYSSE) opens from Sheppard West to Vaughan Metropolitan Centre. |
| July 24, 2023 | Line 3 Scarborough closes following a derailment and the TTC later announces the closure as permanent in August 2023. The permanent closure of Line 3 had already been scheduled for November 2023, in preparation for the extension of Line 2 further into Scarborough in the early 2030s. |
| December 7, 2025 | Line 6 Finch West opens from Finch West to Humber College. It primarily runs along the median of Finch Avenue at surface level. |
| February 8, 2026 | Line 5 Eglinton opens from Mount Dennis to Kennedy. The line follows Eglinton Avenue in a mix of elevated, underground, and median surface-level running. |

=== Line 1 Yonge–University ===
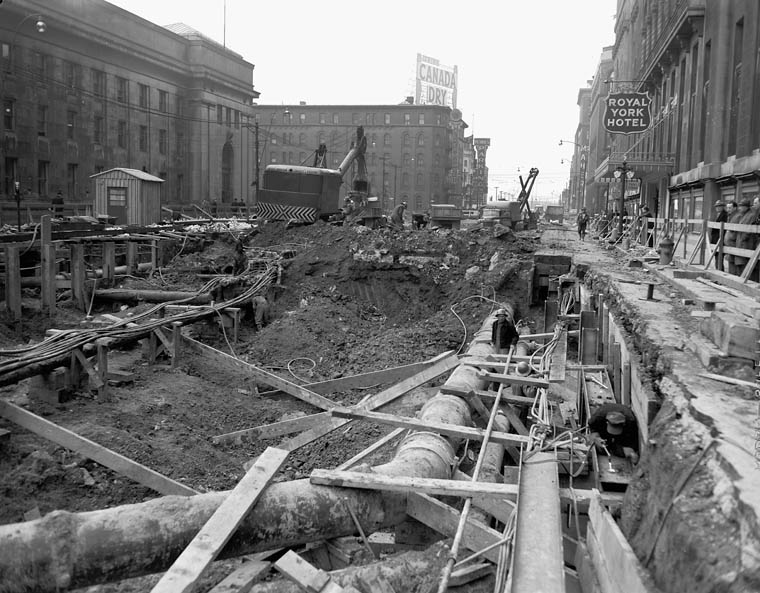
Excavation on Front Street for the Yonge subway, 1950. The line opened in 1954.

Canada's first subway, the Yonge subway, opened in 1954 with a length of 7.4 kilometres (4.6 mi). The line ran under or parallel to Yonge Street between Eglinton Avenue and Union station. It replaced the Yonge streetcar line, Canada's first streetcar line. In 1963, the line was extended northwards from Union station under University Avenue to Bloor Street, where it would later connect with the Bloor–Danforth subway (opened in 1966) at the double-deck St. George station. In 1974, the Yonge Street portion of the line was extended from Eglinton station north to Finch station. The Spadina segment of the line was constructed north from St. George station initially to Wilson station in 1978, and in 1996 to Downsview station, renamed Sheppard West in 2017. Part of the Spadina segment runs in the median of Allen Road – an expressway formerly known as the Spadina Expressway – and crosses over Highway 401 on overpasses. Six decades of extensions gave the line a U-shaped route running from its two northern terminals (Finch and Vaughan Metropolitan Centre stations) and looping on its southern end at Union station. The latest extension from Sheppard West to Vaughan opened on December 17, 2017, making the line 38.8 kilometres (24.1 mi) long, over five times its original length.

=== Line 2 Bloor–Danforth ===
Opened in 1966, the Bloor–Danforth subway runs east–west under or near Bloor Street and Danforth Avenue. It replaced the Bloor streetcar line (which also served Danforth Avenue). Initially, the subway line ran between Keele station and Woodbine station. In 1968, the line was extended west to Islington station and east to Warden station, and in 1980, it was further extended west to Kipling station and east to Kennedy station.

=== Line 3 Scarborough ===
Opened in 1985, Line 3 (originally the Scarborough RT) was a light metro line running from Kennedy station to McCowan station. The TTC started to construct the line to use Canadian Light Rail Vehicles. However, the TTC was forced to convert to the Intermediate Capacity Transit System technology because the provincial government threatened to cut funding to the TTC if it did not. This line was never extended, and in July 2023, the line was shut down pending its dismantling due to a derailment that resulted in injuries. It is set to be replaced with an extension of Line 2 to Sheppard Avenue and McCowan Road via Scarborough Town Centre.

=== Line 4 Sheppard ===
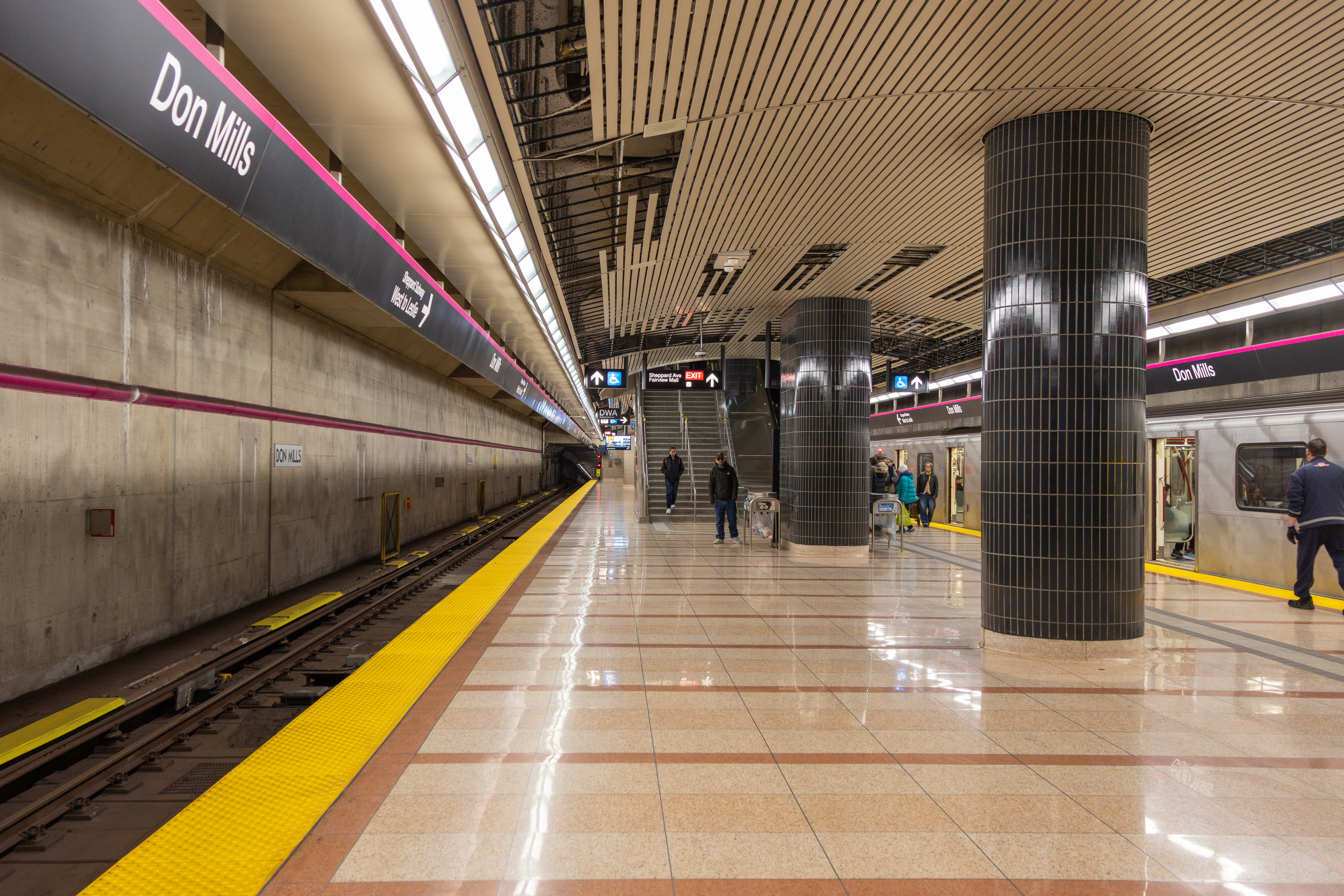
Don Mills station serves as the terminus for Line 4 Sheppard, a subway line that opened in 2002.

Opened in 2002, the Sheppard subway runs under Sheppard Avenue from Sheppard–Yonge station to Don Mills station. The line was under construction when a change in provincial government threatened to terminate the project, but Mel Lastman, the last mayor of the former City of North York (today part of Toronto), used his influence to save the project. Despite the construction of many high-rise residential buildings along the line since its opening, ridership remains low resulting in a subsidy of $10 per ride. The line was intended to be extended to Scarborough Centre station, but because of the low ridership and the cost of tunnelling, there was a plan to extend rapid transit eastwards from Don Mills station via a surface light rail line, the Sheppard East LRT. However, in April 2019, Premier Doug Ford announced that the provincial government would extend Line 4 Sheppard to McCowan Road at some unspecified time in the future, thus replacing the proposed Sheppard East LRT.

=== Line 5 Eglinton ===
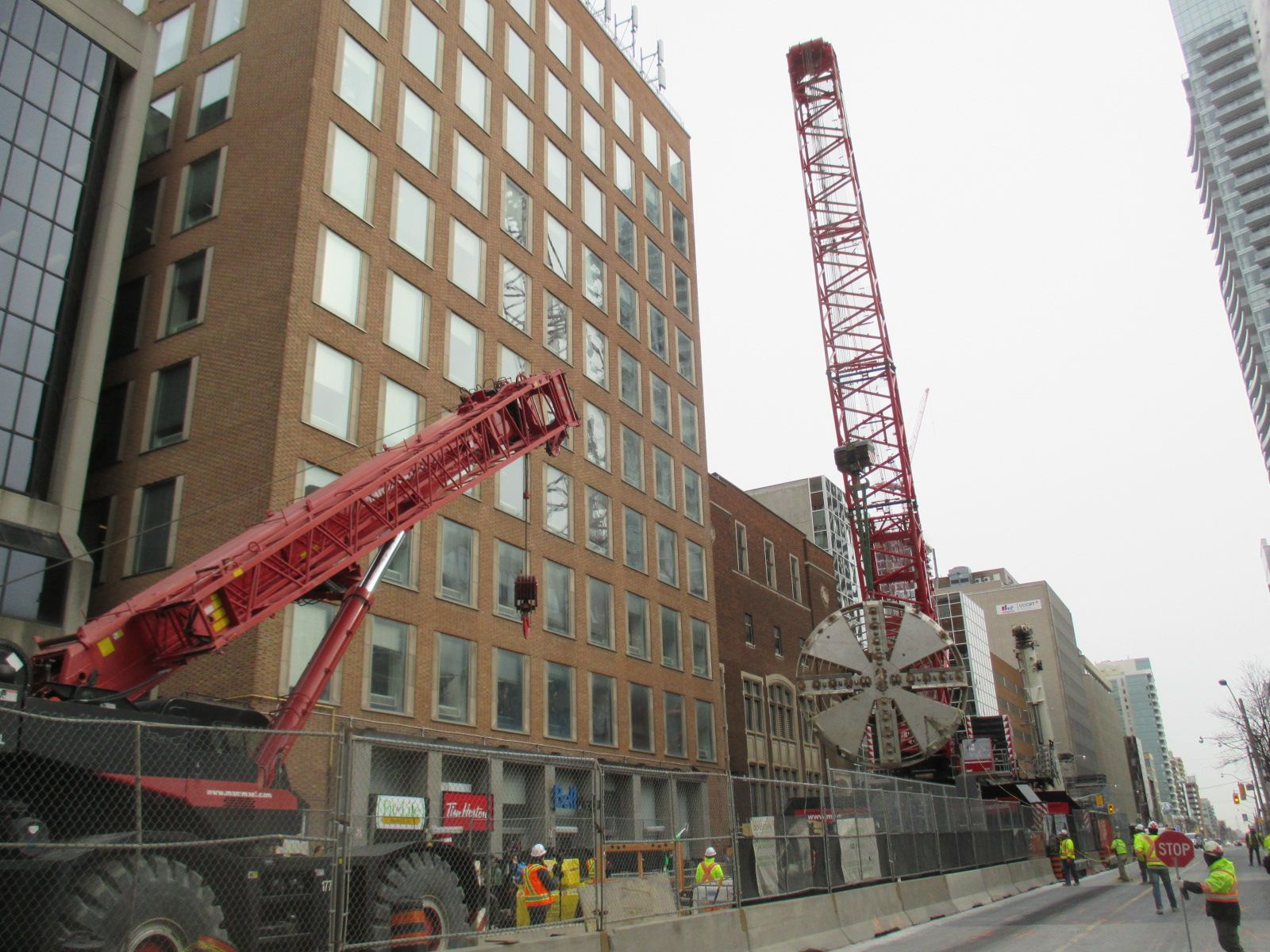
Pieces of a tunnel boring machine extracted during the construction of Line 5 Eglinton, 2017

Metrolinx funded the 19-kilometre (12 mi) Line 5 Eglinton, a light rail line along Eglinton Avenue. From Mount Dennis in the west to Brentcliffe Road (east of Laird Drive), the line runs almost entirely underground where Eglinton Avenue is generally four to five lanes wide. From east of Brentcliffe Road to Kennedy station, the line operates on the surface in a reserved median in the middle of Eglinton Avenue, where the street is at least six lanes wide. Building on the surface instead of tunnelling reduced the cost of construction on the eastern end of the line. The average speed of the line is 28 kilometres per hour (17 mph); as a comparison, the average speed of the heavy-rail Line 2 Bloor–Danforth is 32 kilometres per hour (20 mph). The Eglinton line originated from Transit City, a plan sponsored by then–Toronto mayor David Miller, to expedite transit improvement by building several light rail lines through the lower density parts of the city. Line 5 was expected to be completed in 2024, but it has faced numerous delays. The Government of Ontario announced on December 5, 2025, that substantial completion of the line had been achieved and that full operational control would be transferred from Metrolinx to the TTC, with service expected to begin in early 2026. The TTC later announced that Line 5 would open for revenue service on February 8, 2026, as part of a phased opening.

=== Line 6 Finch West ===
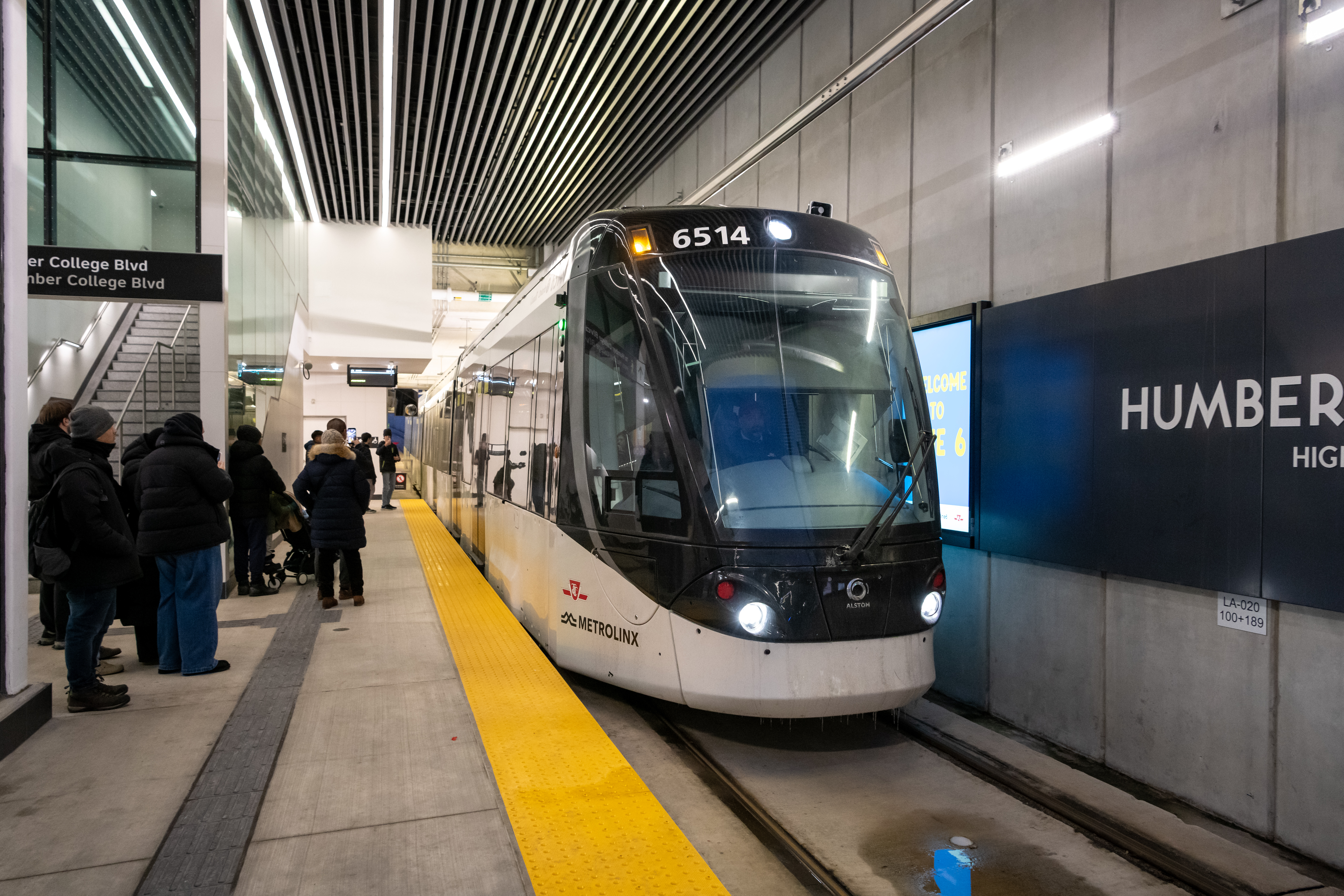
Humber College station, the western terminus of Line 6 Finch West

Opened in 2025, Line 6 Finch West, also known as the "Finch West LRT", is a surface light rail line owned by Metrolinx. It is operated by the TTC and was also part of the Transit City proposal announced in 2007. The 10.3-kilometre (6.4 mi), 18-stop line extends from Finch West station on Line 1 Yonge–University to Humber College station at the north campus of Humber Polytechnic (formerly Humber College). The line is forecast to carry about 14.6 million riders a year or 40,000 a day by 2031. Construction on this line began in 2019. It was scheduled for revenue service in the first half of 2024, with an estimated cost of $1.2 billion, though it was delayed until December 7, 2025.

=== Ontario Line ===
Ontario Line is an under-construction 15.6-kilometre (9.7 mi) subway line from Exhibition station to Don Valley station, providing a second rapid transit line through the Financial District and downtown core. Although a subway line along Queen Street was first proposed in the early 1900s, the Downtown Relief Line was first proposed in the mid-1980s. The Ontario Line project extends further west and north than previous proposals to serve more of the city. The line is scheduled for completion in 2031 at a cost of $17 to $19 billion. Upon opening, the plan is for the line to use the "Line 3" moniker formerly used by Line 3 Scarborough.

=== Major incidents ===
On March 27, 1963, there was an electrical short in a subway car's motor. The driver decided to continue operating the train, despite visible smoke in the affected car, until the train reached Union station. This decision resulted in the destruction of six subway cars and extensive damage to the tunnel and signal lines west of Union station. Following this incident, safety procedures involving electrical malfunctions and/or fire in subway trains, were revised to improve safety and reduce the likelihood of a similar incident occurring.

On October 14, 1976, arson caused the destruction of four subway cars and damage to Christie station, resulting in the closure of part of the Bloor–Danforth line for three days, and the bypassing of Christie station for some time afterwards for repairs.

On August 11, 1995, the TTC suffered the deadliest subway accident in Canadian history, known as the Russell Hill accident, on the Yonge–University line south of St. Clair West station. Halfway between St. Clair West and Dupont stations, a southbound Line 1 subway train hit the rear of a stationary train ahead of it. Three people died and 100 other people were injured, some of them seriously. This led to a major reorganization at the TTC, with more focus on maintaining a "state of good repair" (i.e., an increased emphasis on safety and maintenance of existing TTC capital/services) and less on expansion.

On July 24, 2023, the last car of a train on Line 3 Scarborough derailed south of Ellesmere station. There were 45 people on board, with five injuries reported. The TTC closed the line while the cause of the accident, which was not immediately apparent, was investigated. Though the TTC planned to close Line 3 in November 2023, it announced on August 24 that the line would not reopen.

== Operations and procedures ==
=== Line specifications ===
| Line | Opened | Stations | Length | Technology | Track gauge | Electrification |
|---|---|---|---|---|---|---|
| Yonge–University | 1954 | 38 | 38.4 km (23.9 mi) | Heavy rail | Toronto gauge (1,495 mm) | 600 V DC third rail |
| Bloor–Danforth | 1966 | 31 | 26.2 km (16.3 mi) | Heavy rail | Toronto gauge (1,495 mm) | 600 V DC third rail |
| Sheppard | 2002 | 5 | 5.5 km (3.4 mi) | Heavy rail | Toronto gauge (1,495 mm) | 600 V DC third rail |
| Eglinton | 2026 | 25 | 19 km (12 mi) | Light rail | Standard gauge (1,435 mm) | 750 V DC overhead line |
| Finch West | 2025 | 18 (Note: With the exception of its eastern and western terminal stations, all stops along Line 6 Finch West are surface-level stops in the road median, similar to the 512 St. Clair and 510 Spadina streetcar lines, rather than full stations.) | 10.3 km (6.4 mi) | Light rail | Standard gauge (1,435 mm) | 750 V DC overhead line |
Under construction
| Eglinton Crosstown west extension | 2031 (Note: Estimated year of opening) | 7 | 9.2 km (5.7 mi) | Light rail | Standard gauge (1,435 mm) | 750 V DC overhead line |
| Scarborough subway extension | 2033 | 3 | 7.8 km (4.8 mi) | Heavy rail | Toronto gauge (1,495 mm) | 600 V DC third rail |
| Ontario Line | 2030s | 15 | 15.6 km (9.7 mi) | Heavy rail | Standard gauge (1,435 mm) | 1,500 V DC overhead line |
| Yonge North subway extension | 2030s | 5 | 8 km (5.0 mi) | Heavy rail | Toronto gauge (1,495 mm) | 600 V DC third rail |
Former lines
| Scarborough | 1985–2023 | 6 | 6.4 km (4.0 mi) | Light metro | Standard gauge (1,435 mm) | 600 V DC fifth rail |

=== Terminal station reversals and short turns ===
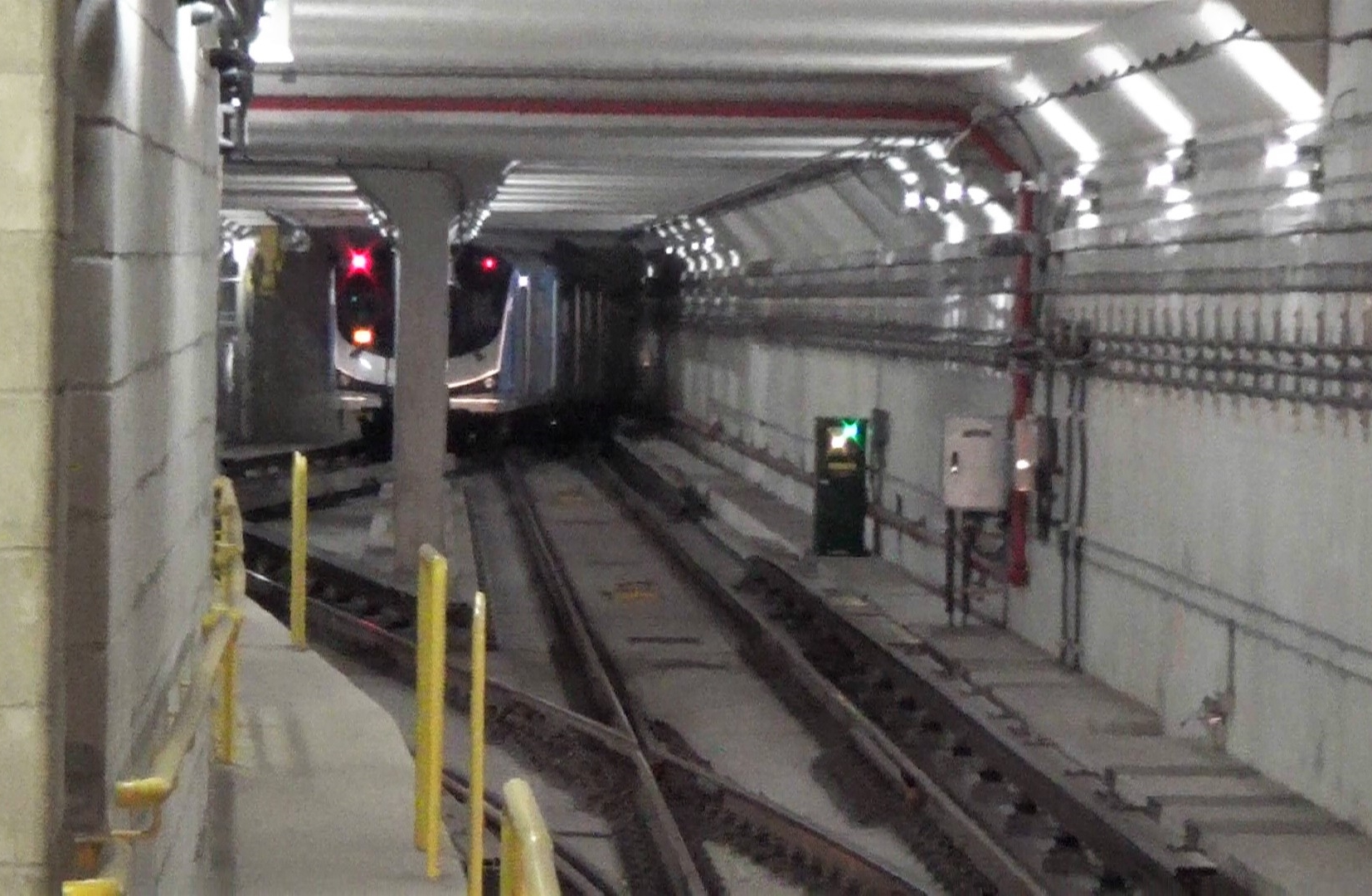
A Toronto Rocket train using the crossover at Vaughan Metropolitan Centre, a terminal station, to reverse

The heavy-rail subway lines were built in multiple segments with multiple crossovers. These are typically used for reversals at terminal stations, and allow arriving and departing trains to cross to and from the station's farside platform. They are also used for short turning trains at some through stations in order to accommodate emergency and planned service suspensions. Planned service suspensions generally occur on weekends for planned maintenance activities that are impractical to perform overnight. There is only one regular short turn service that occurs during the morning rush hour on Line 1 Yonge–University when some northbound trains short turn at Glencairn station.

On the former Line 3 Scarborough, light metro trains were not able to switch direction except at the ends of the line as there were no intermediate crossovers between the two termini. Thus, no short turns on Line 3 were possible.

=== Train operation ===
==== Two-person train operation ====
Lines 1, 2, and 4 use either a one- or two-person crew. With two-person train operation, the train is driven by a train operator, with an on-board guard at the rear of the train opening and closing the doors, ensuring no one is trapped before the train departs. At each subway platform, a set of three 15-centimetre-wide (6 in) platform markers are affixed onto the platform wall. The train operator and guard use them to position the train.

As of 2025, the platform markers used for Lines 1, 2, and 4 are as follows:

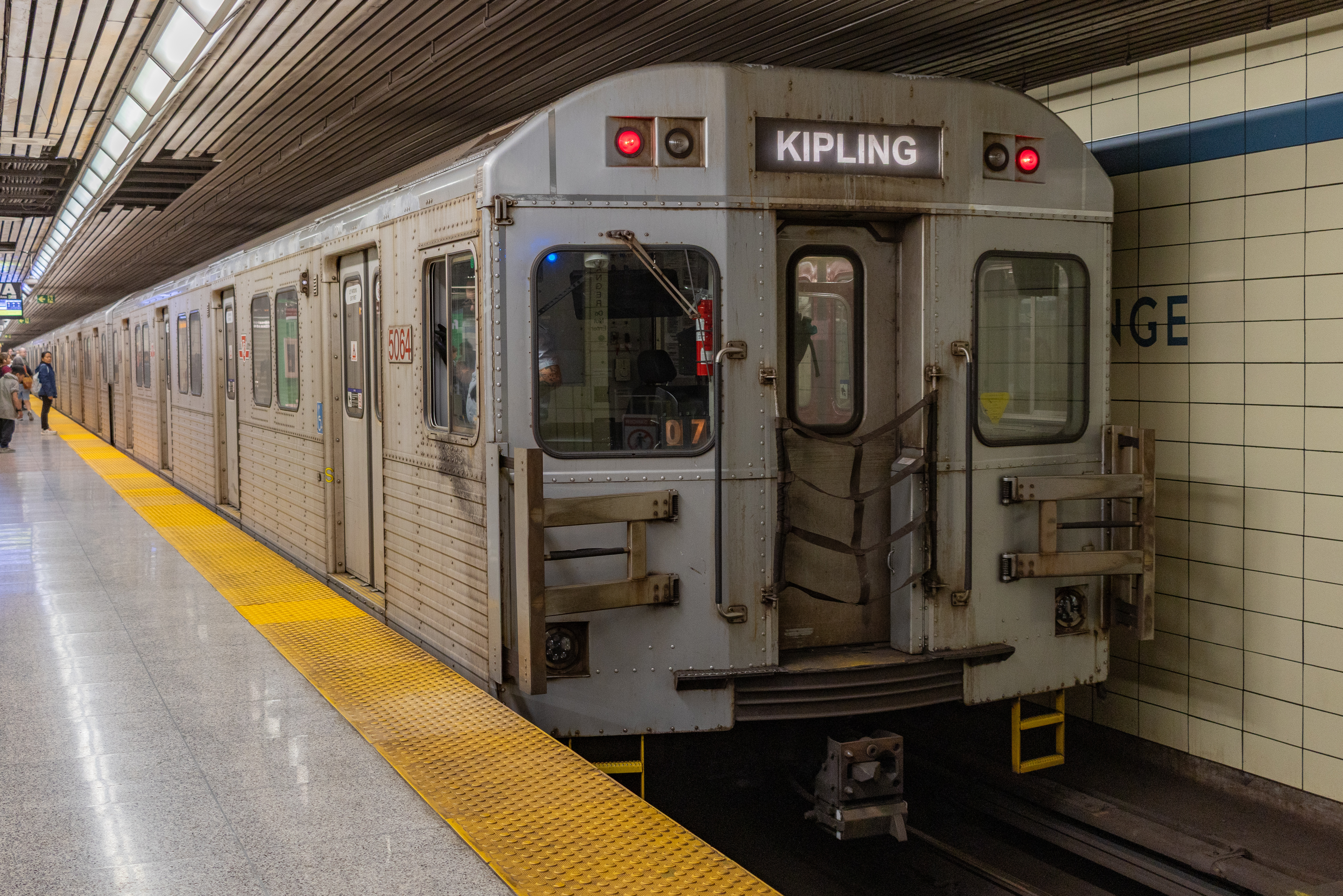
Subway doors on Line 2 are operated by a train guard, situated in the trailing operator cab.

- Circular red disk (Lines 1, 2, and 4) – This marker is typically mounted on the station platform wall to assist the train operator in positioning the train in the station. When the operator's window is aligned with the red disk, the train is properly berthed in the station.
- Green triangle (Lines 1 and 2) – This marker is typically mounted on the station platform wall to indicate to the guard, who is positioned in the trailing car, that it is safe to open the doors. When the guard's window is aligned with this marker, the guard must confirm the stop position by physically pointing to the green triangle. If the guard cannot see the green triangle, they are not permitted to open the train doors. After the doors are opened, the guard is required to stick their head out the cab window to observe passengers boarding and exiting. The train doors remain open for at least 15 seconds.
- Orange triangle (Lines 1 and 2) – This marker is mounted on the station platform wall to assist the guard, who is positioned in the last car, in observing the platform as the train exits the station to ensure that no passengers are being dragged along by the train. When the guard reaches this triangle, they can cease observations. The distance between the green and orange triangles is typically the length of three cars.

When the guard determines that boarding is complete, electronic chimes sound and orange lights above the doorways flash while the automated announcement "please stand clear of the doors" is played over the train's public address system, and subsequently the doors are closed. The chimes are played before the automated announcement because such announcements may not be heard when the station is crowded. In 1991, the chimes and flashing lights were tested and gradually introduced system-wide during the 1990s. After the doors are closed, a light turns on in the operating cab. Until 1991, the guard alerted patrons to the closing doors with two short whistle blasts.

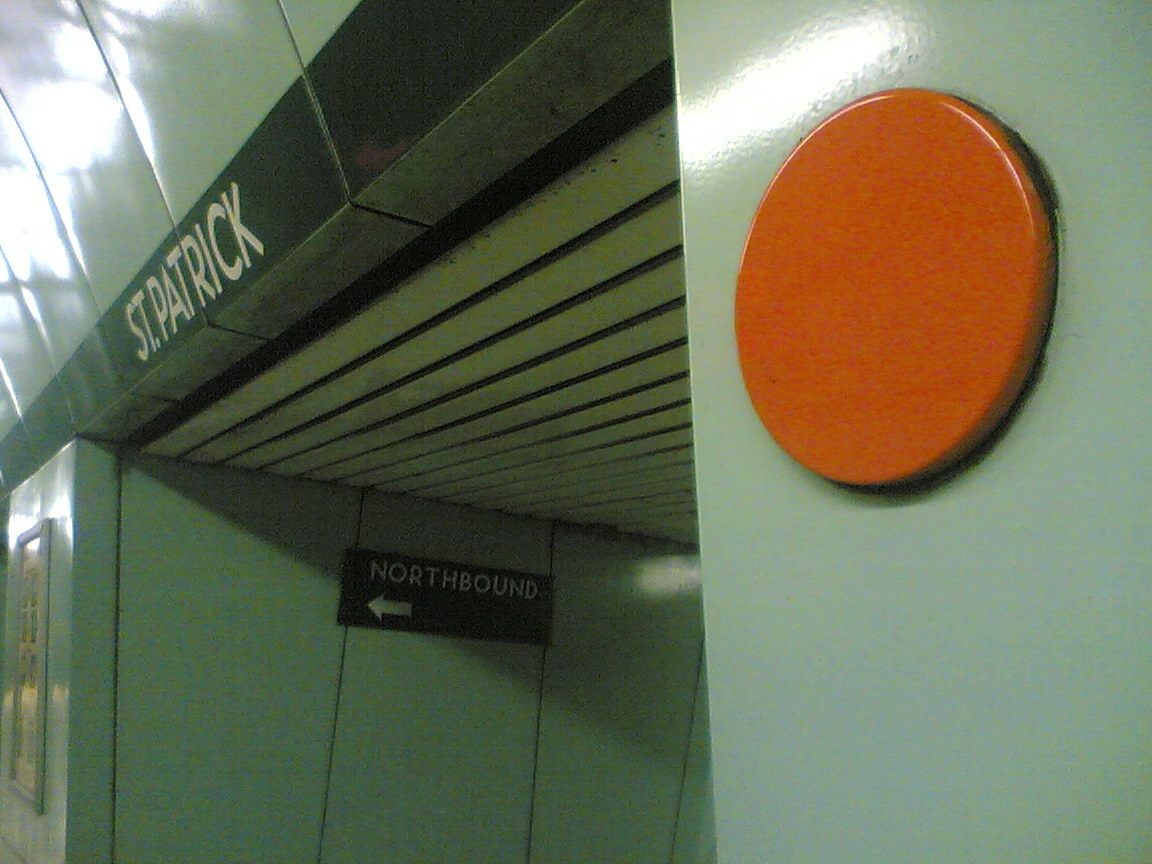
An orange circle platform marker was used to assist the train guard as the train departed the station prior to 2017. An example from Line 1's St. Patrick station is pictured.

Prior to 2017, when subway guards operated the doors from the fifth car instead of the trailing car in the T1 trains on Line 2, different platform markers were used. The following markers have now fallen into disuse as a result of a March 2017 policy change that required all guards to work from the trailing car on Line 2:

- Circular green disk – This marker was mounted on the station platform wall in front of the guard's window in the fifth car from the lead unit. It indicated to the guard that the train was properly berthed. The guard was required to point to the circle before opening the doors to confirm the stop position.
- Circular orange disk – This marker was mounted on the station platform wall to indicate to the guard when they could cease train departure platform observations. At this point, the guard closed the cab window.

==== One-person train operation ====
With one-person train operation (OPTO), used on other large subway systems – such as the London Underground, the Paris Metro, the Chicago "L" and the Montreal Metro – the train operator opens and closes the doors as well as driving the train.

Initially, Lines 1, 2, and 4 all used two-person train operation. On October 9, 2016, Line 4 Sheppard was converted to OPTO. Beginning August 1, 2021, the TTC tested OPTO on a portion of Line 1 on Sundays only. Effective November 21, 2021, the TTC applied OPTO every day on Line 1 between Vaughan Metropolitan Centre and St. George stations, continuing to use two-person train operation between St. George and Finch until fully adopting OPTO on the line on November 20, 2022. Line 5 Eglinton and Line 6 Finch West trains have used OPTO since they began service, as did Line 3 Scarborough, which operated from 1985 to 2023.

A 2020 survey conducted by the Amalgamated Transit Union Local 113 indicated that two-thirds of Torontonians surveyed opposed the TTC's plan to eliminate the train guard on Line 1, and that three-quarters of them disapproved of the lack of public consultation before train guards were removed from Line 4 in 2016, citing safety concerns, among other issues, as key reasons motivating their response.

=== Station announcements ===
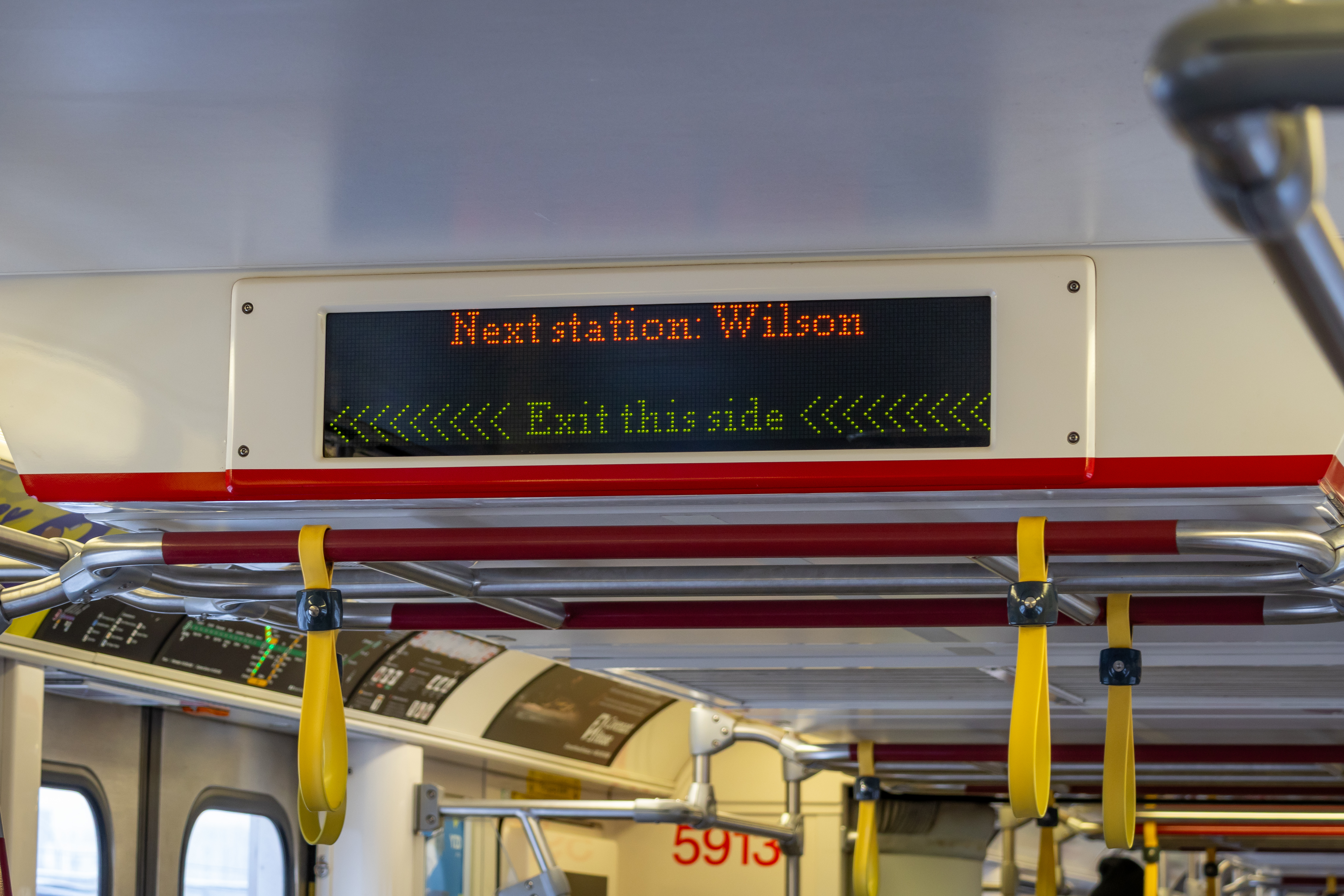
The Toronto Rocket uses multi-coloured LED signs to provide visible stop announcements and display visual arrows pointing to the side where the doors will open on at the next stop (except at terminus stations).

On January 8, 1995, train operators began to announce each stop manually over the train's speaker system as a result of pressure from advocacy groups for the visually impaired, but announcements were sporadic until the TTC began to enforce the policy circa 2005. Later, automated announcements were implemented under further pressure from the advocacy groups. All TTC trains use an automated system to announce each station, which is played twice over the speaker system: when the train departs a station (e.g. "The next station is: Dufferin, Dufferin station") and when it arrives at the following station (e.g. "Arriving at: Dufferin, Dufferin station"). In addition, trains on all lines except Line 2 provide visible and audible automatic stop announcements. These trains also announce connections to other Toronto subway lines as well as connections to other public transit service providers where applicable, and announce, except at terminus stations, which side the train doors will open on at each stop based on the direction of train travel. Lines 5 and 6 – because they are owned by the provincial entity Metrolinx, which makes them subject to the French Language Services Act – use bilingual English and French station announcements in a slightly different format (e.g. "next station, prochaine station, Mount Pleasant, Mount Pleasant station").

=== Winter operations ===
Switches and power rails are vulnerable to malfunction under extreme winter conditions such as heavy snow or freezing rain. During such events, the TTC runs "storm trains" overnight along subway lines to keep power rails clear of ice. The TTC also has trains to apply an anti-freeze to the power rail once freezing rain starts.

These precautions were also used on Line 3 Scarborough, which used two power rails. After reviewing operations during the winter of 2018–2019, the TTC decided to change its procedures for Line 3. Thus, about two hours before an expected storm, the TTC would decide whether to shut down Line 3 and replace it with bus service. Just before the storm of February 2, 2022, the TTC replaced all Line 3 trains with 25 buses.

To keep switches in the yards from freezing, crews use switch heaters and manually monitor them to ensure they stay in working order during winter storms. Workcars are run as storm trains within the yards to prevent ice from building up on the power rails. The TTC stores subway trains in tunnels along main lines rather than in exterior yards.

== Stations ==
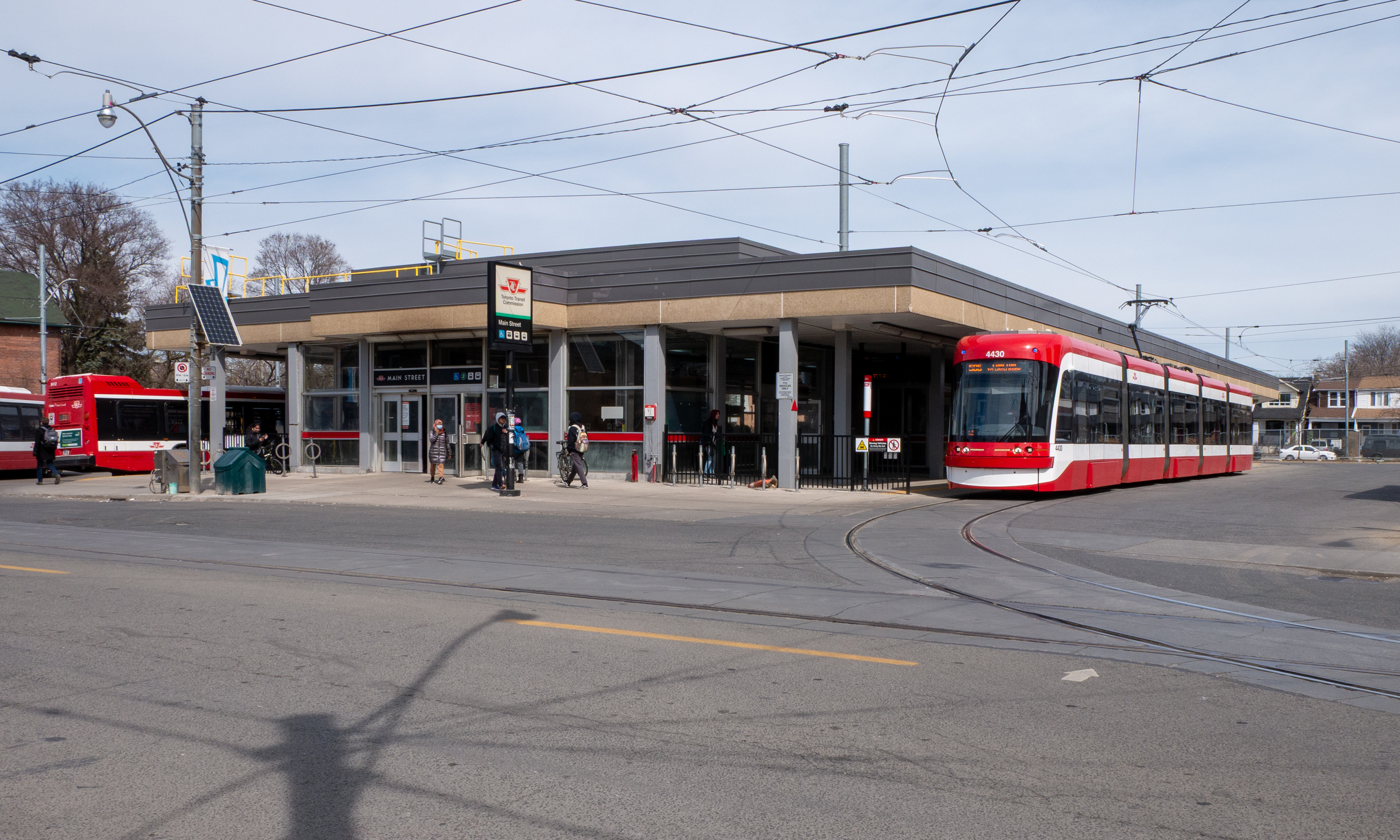
Many underground stations feature termini for bus and streetcar services, such as this one at Main Street station.

The Toronto subway has 109 stations and stops across five lines. Many stations are named for the nearest major arterial road crossed by the line in question. Some are named for major landmarks, such as shopping centres or transportation hubs, served by the station. The stations along the University Avenue section of Line 1 Yonge–University, in particular, are named entirely for landmarks and public institutions (Museum, Queen's Park, and Osgoode) and major churches (St. Patrick and St. Andrew). All trains, except for short turns, stop at every station along their route and run the entire length of their line from terminus to terminus. Many stations outside the central business district have termini for local TTC bus routes and streetcar routes situated within their fare-paid areas.

=== Payment ===
To pay their fare, riders can tap their Presto, debit or credit card, or mobile wallet on a Presto card reader in a station before boarding a train or on the bus or streetcar. All regular TTC bus and streetcar routes permit two-hour free transfers both to and from connecting TTC lines.

Fare gates or transaction processors with electronic payment options are installed in all stations. On the street-running segments of Line 5 Eglinton and Line 6 Finch West, passengers tap on the Presto card readers (station fare transaction processors) installed on the platform entry ramps before boarding.

=== Accessibility ===
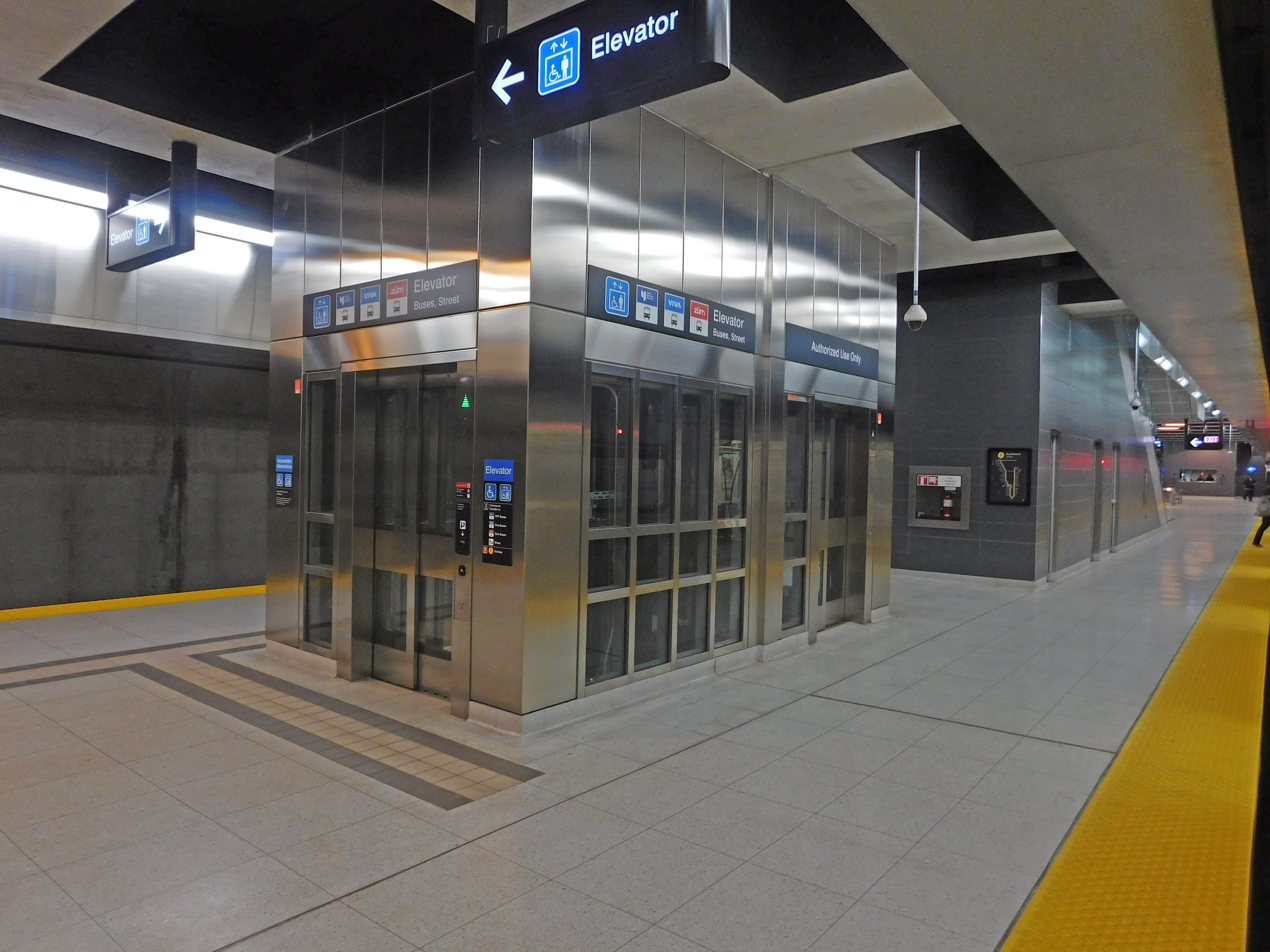
Elevators at the subway platform of Vaughan Metropolitan Centre station

Most of the Toronto subway system was built before wheelchair access was a requirement under the Ontarians with Disabilities Act (ODA). However, all stations built since 1996 are equipped with elevators. As of December 2025, 86 percent (75 of 87) of the stations, excluding those on Line 5 Eglinton, then under construction, are accessible following upgrade works to add elevators, wide fare gates, and access doors to the station.

Although plans were made to ensure all stations were accessible for people with disabilities by 2025, in September 2024, it was reported this goal would not be met until 2026. As of 2026, only College, Islington, King, Museum, Old Mill and Spadina stations are not fully accessible. In comparison, the Montreal Metro plans for all stations to be accessible by 2038, the Chicago "L" plans for all stations to be accessible in the 2030s, and the New York City Subway plans for 95 percent of stations to be accessible by 2055.

All TTC trains offer level boarding for customers with wheelchairs and other accessibility needs, with priority seating and dedicated wheelchair areas onboard each train.

=== Washrooms ===
Washrooms are available at a few stations and within paid fare area:

- Finch
- Sheppard-Yonge
- Eglinton
- Bloor-Yonge
- Cedarvale
- Wilson
- Sheppard West
- Finch West
- Highway 407
- Vaughan Metropolitan Centre
- Kipling
- Kennedy
- Mount Dennis
- Humber College

Warden station had facilities but closed as it was within the old bus terminal that was demolished.

=== Cleanliness ===
The May 2010 TTC cleanliness audit of subway stations found that none of them meet the transit agency's highest standard for cleanliness and general state of repair. Only 21 stations scored in the 70- to 80-percent range in the TTC's cleanliness scale, a range described as "ordinary tidiness", while 45 fell in the 60- to 70-percent range, achieving what the commission describes as "casual inattentiveness". The May audit was the third in a series of comprehensive assessments that began in 2009. The commission announced a "cleaning blitz" that would add 30 new temporary cleaners for the latter part of 2010 to address major issues and has other action plans that include more full-time cleaners, and new and more effective ways at addressing station cleanliness.

The TTC implemented stricter cleanliness protocols during the COVID-19 pandemic from 2020 to 2022.

=== Design and public art ===
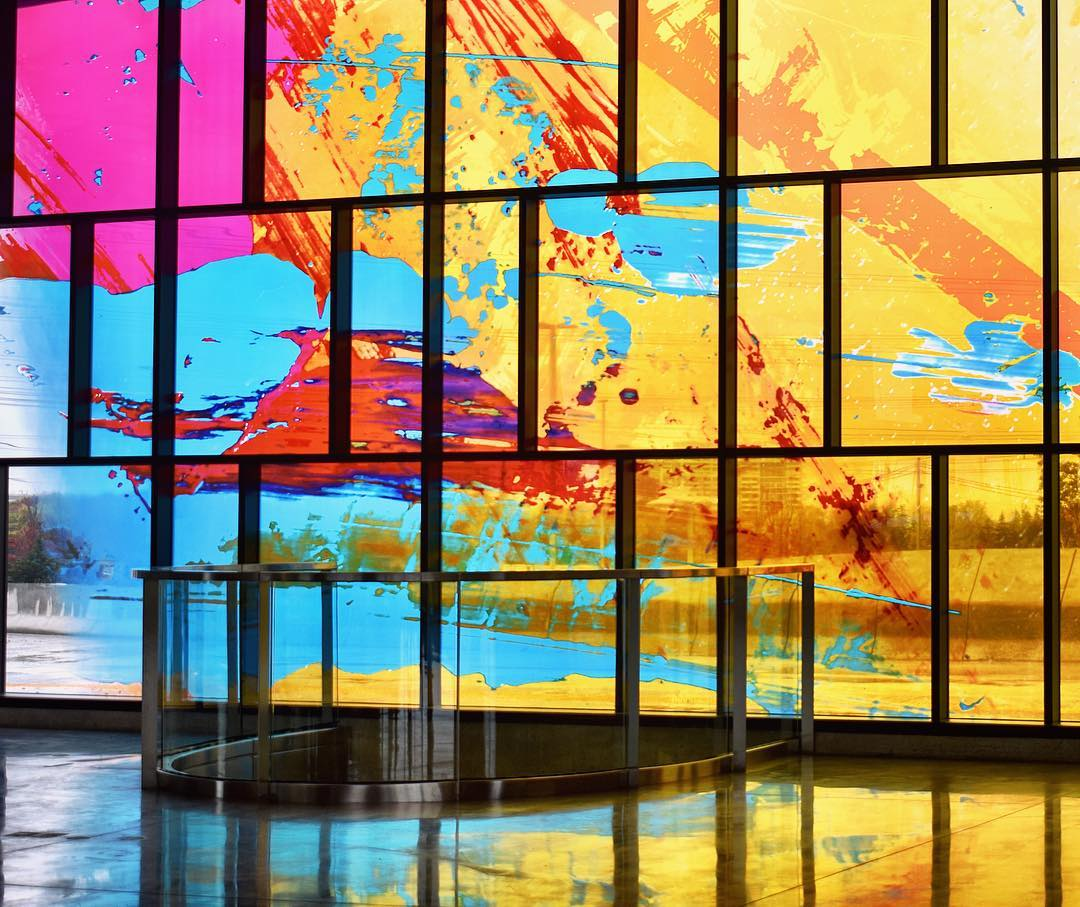
Stained glass artwork Sky Ellipse at Highway 407 station

According to a 1991 CBC report, "aesthetics weren't really a priority" on Toronto's subway system, describing stations as "a series of bathrooms without plumbing". Since that time, Toronto's subway system has had over 40 pieces installed in various subway stations. More art appeared as new stations were built and older ones were renovated.

In 2004, USA Today said of Line 4 Sheppard (then known as the Sheppard subway): "Despite the remarkable engineering feats of this metro, known as Sheppard Subway, [it is] the art covering walls, ceilings, and platforms of all five stations that stands out. Each station is 'a total art experience where artists have created imaginative environments, uniquely expressing themes of community, location, and heritage' through panoramic landscapes and ceramic wall murals."

=== Internet and mobile phone access ===
==== Wireless service implementation ====
In 2012, the TTC awarded a contract to BAI Communications Canada to design, build and maintain a celular and Wi-Fi system along Toronto subway lines. BAI agreed to pay $25 million to the TTC over a 20-year period for the exclusive rights to provide the service. BAI in turn would sell access to the cellular system to other carriers.

On December 13, 2013, Wi-Fi Internet access was launched at Bloor–Yonge and St. George stations. The ad-supported service (branded as "TConnect") was provided by BAI Canada. The TTC and BAI Canada planned to offer TConnect at all underground stations. Commuters had to view a video advertisement to gain access to the Internet. It was expected that all of the 70 subway stations would have service by 2017, as well as the six stations along the Line 1 extension to Vaughan. From early December 2015 to late January 2016, users of TConnect were required to authenticate using a Twitter account, with Twitter's Canadian operations sponsoring the TConnect Wi-Fi network. Users of the network could sign in to enable an automatic Wi-Fi connection for 30 days. This arrangement was resumed on an optional basis from July 2016 to early December 2016. By August 2017, Wi-Fi was available at all existing stations and would be available in all future stations.

On June 17, 2015, the TTC announced that Wind Mobile (later rebranded Freedom Mobile) customers would be able to access cellular connectivity at some TTC subway stations. Service was initially between Bloor–Yonge and St. George stations on Line 1, and between Bloor–Yonge and Spadina stations on Line 2. Other carriers declined to use the BAI cellular system because of the price BAI was asking for access.

In April 2023, Rogers Communications took over BAI Communications and honoured existing access to Freedom Mobile customers. In August 2023, Rogers implemented 5G wireless service at all the TTC's downtown stations and within the tunnels between them. In September 2023, the federal government imposed new licence conditions requiring that cellphone and data services be available on the entire subway network by the end of 2026 and that all carriers, including Telus and Bell, were to have access to it. On October 2, 2023, Bell and Telus offered its cellular customers access to the subway's 5G system.

By November 2023, wireless service had been expanded to all TTC stations and to the tunnels between Sheppard West and Vaughan Metropolitan Centre stations, but only for Rogers and Freedom customers. Bell and Telus customers continued to have wireless service at a limited number of stations. In December 2023, Telus and Bell reached a deal with Rogers to provide their customers the same subway wireless services as Rogers and Freedom customers.

Rogers and the TTC decided to end TConnect, the free public Wi-Fi service, on December 27, 2024, due to low usage, the lack of security, the slow speed, and the cost of upgrading it.

==== Wireless services ====
Rogers 5G wireless service is available in all underground stations for customers of Rogers, Freedom Mobile, Telus and Bell, but service access between stations is limited. 5G wireless service is available in open sections, as well as between Bloor–Yonge and Dupont stations on Line 1, and between Castle Frank and Keele stations on Line 2. 5G service is also available in the tunnels between Sheppard West and Vaughan Metropolitan Centre stations. Wireless service is available to customers of Rogers, Freedom Mobile, Bell and Telus (including flanker brands of these companies such as Koodo and Virgin Plus). This wireless service is not free, and users require a subscription from one of the four aforementioned carriers, given the lack of subsidized wireless plans in Ontario. Line 5 Eglinton also has cellular coverage in its stations and tunnels.

=== Naming ===
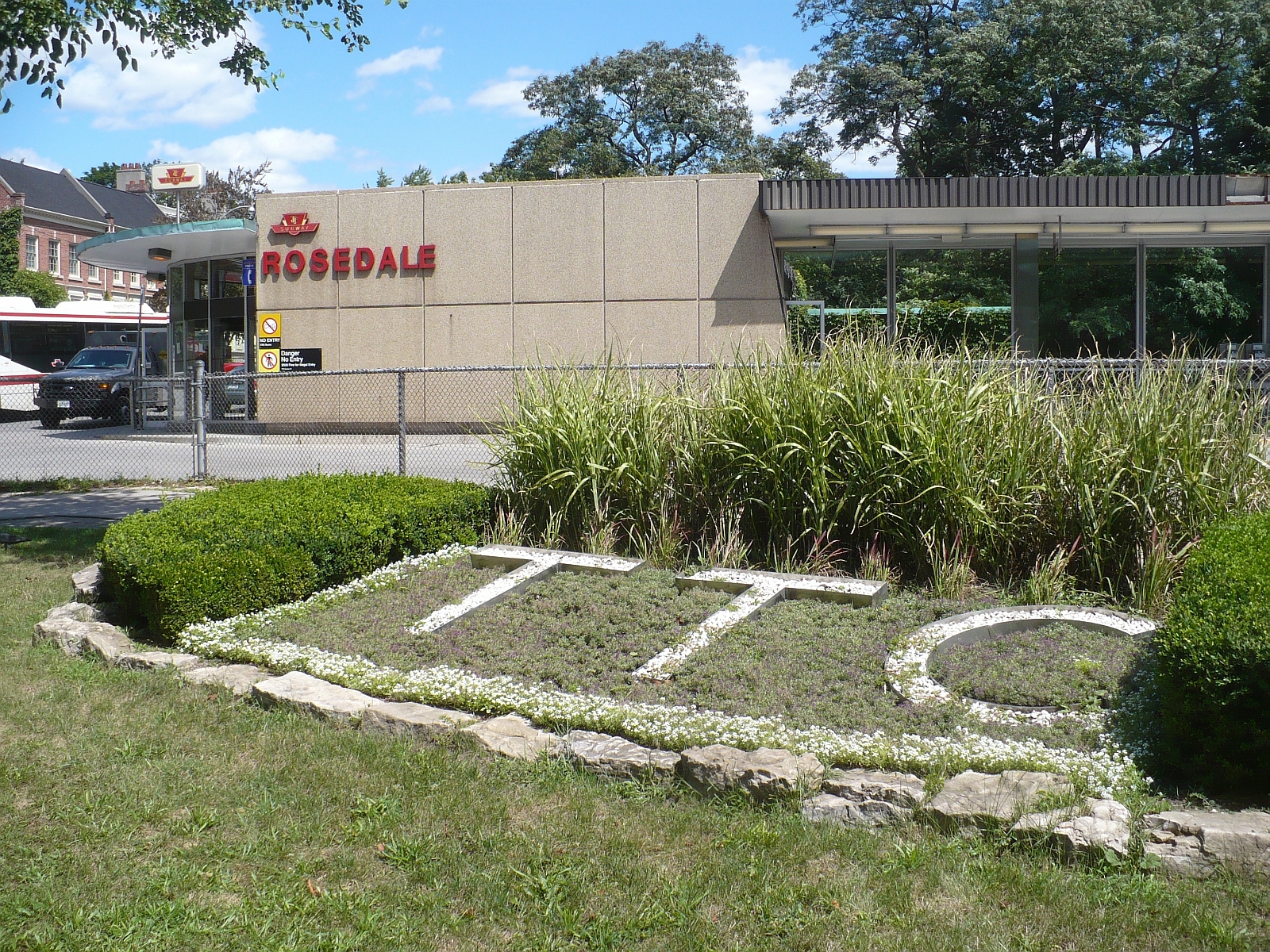
Rosedale station bears the name of the neighbourhood (Rosedale) in which it is located.

The TTC considers multiple factors when naming stations and stops, such as local landmarks, the location's cross streets, distinct communities of the past and present in the vicinity of the location, names of other stations and stops in the system, and the grade of the station or stop infrastructure.

Metrolinx uses five criteria for naming stations and stops. These are:

1. Simplicity
2. Names must be logical and relevant to the area the station is built in
3. Names should be relevant for the life of the station
4. Names should help passengers locate themselves within the region
5. Uniqueness

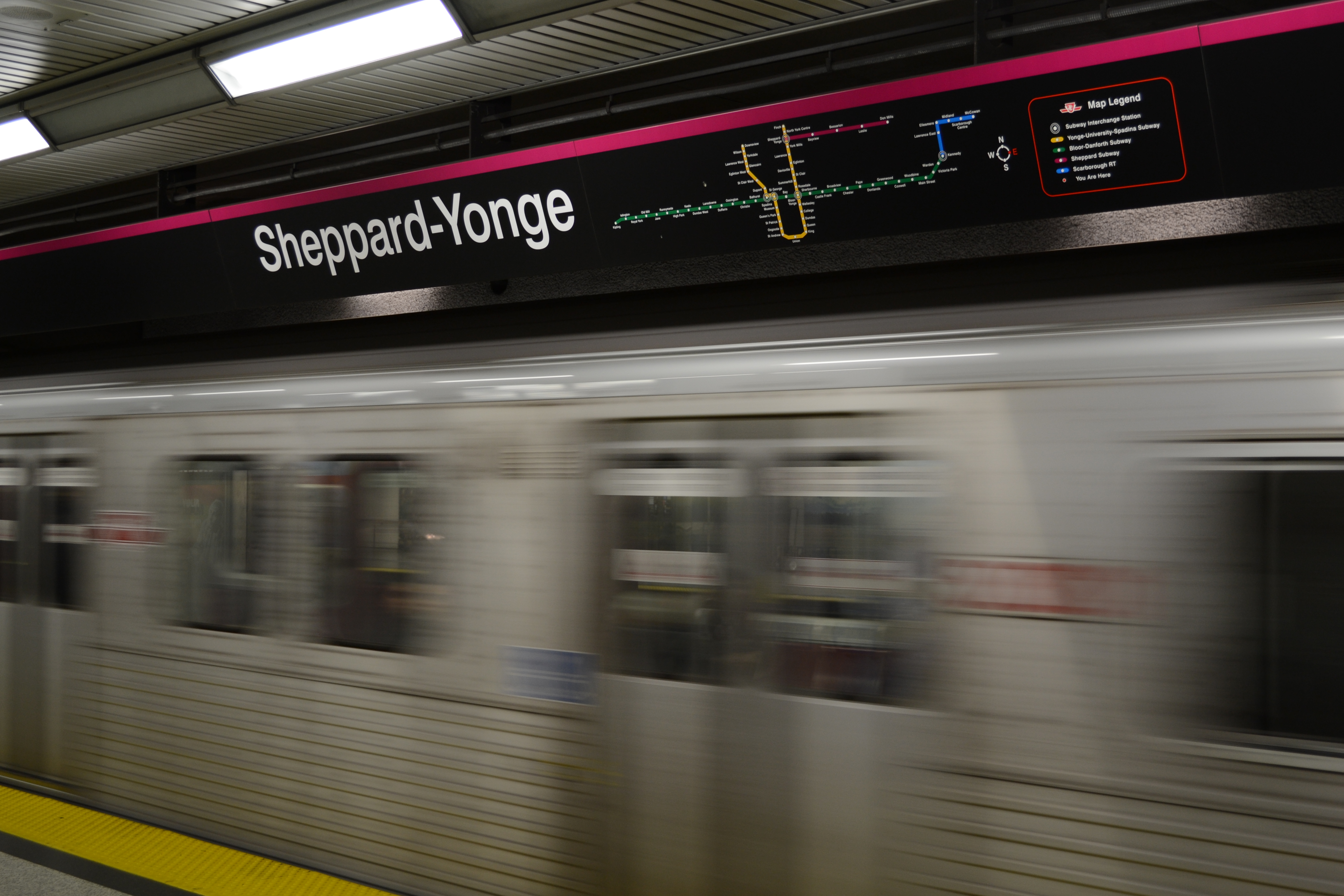
Sheppard–Yonge station bears the name of the nearby intersection of Sheppard Avenue and Yonge Street. This station was formerly known as Sheppard station but was renamed in 2002 when Line 4 Sheppard opened.

Metrolinx uses the word "stop" in place of "station" at 10 of the 25 stations along the first phase of Line 5 Eglinton located on street-running sections.

== Rolling stock ==
The following table shows the vehicle type by line:

| Line | Vehicle | Number of cars | Cars per train | Passenger capacity per train |
|---|---|---|---|---|
| Yonge–University | Toronto Rocket (TR) | 456 | 6 | 1080 |
| Bloor–Danforth | T series (T1) | 370 | 6 | 1000 |
| Sheppard | Toronto Rocket (TR) | 24 | 4 | 720 (Note: 4-car TR train capacity prorated from the capacity of the 6-car TR train.) |
| Eglinton | Flexity Freedom | 76 | 2 | 163–490 |
| Finch West | Citadis Spirit | 17 | 1 | 336 |

=== Heavy rail stock ===
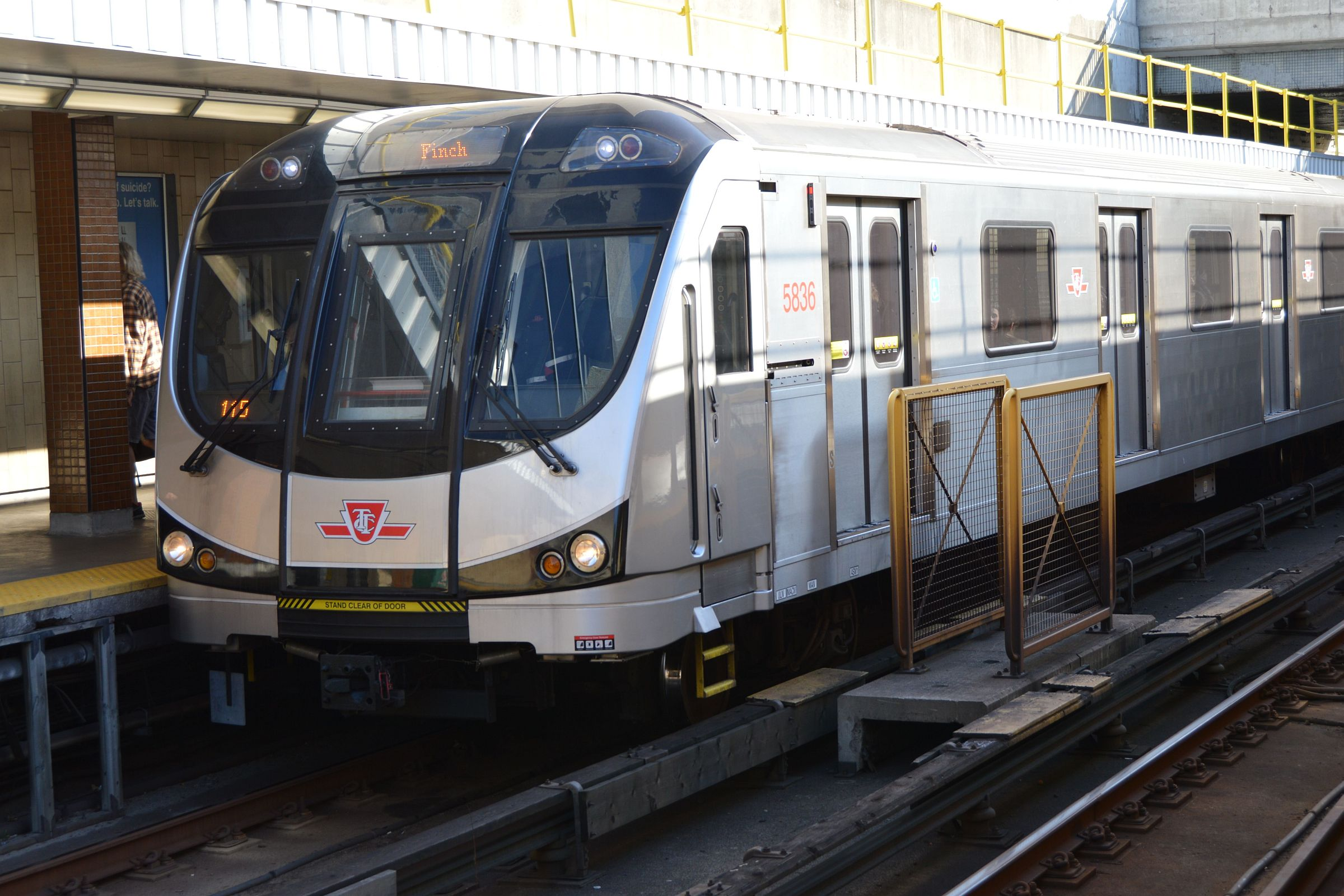
The Toronto Rocket is the newest heavy rail subway train used by the TTC.

Line 1 Yonge–University and Line 4 Sheppard operate using the newest version of Toronto's subway cars, the Toronto Rocket, while Line 2 Bloor–Danforth uses the older T1 subway trains.

The TTC's original G-series cars were manufactured by the Gloucester Railway Carriage and Wagon Company. All subsequent heavy-rail subway cars were manufactured by Bombardier Transportation or one of its predecessors (Montreal Locomotive Works, Hawker Siddeley, and UTDC). All cars starting with the Hawker Siddeley H series in 1965 have been built in Bombardier's Thunder Bay, Ontario, plant. The final H4 subway cars were retired on January 27, 2012. This was followed by the retirement of the H5 subway cars, which had their final in-service trip on June 14, 2013, and the H6 retirement, which followed one year later with a final run on June 20, 2014.

Following the introduction of the Toronto Rocket trains on Lines 1 and 4, all the T1 trains were moved to Line 2. The T1s were expected to last until 2026. By the end of 2019, the TTC had considered an overhaul to extend the T1 fleet's life by 10 years at an estimated cost of $100 million. As of 2022, the TTC planned to overhaul the T1 fleet if newer trains could not be delivered in time.

In January 2026, Alstom was awarded a contract valued at $2.3 billion to supply 70 six-car Metropolis subway trains. The new fleet will primarily replace trains on Line 2, with additional units allocated for planned Line 1 and 2 extensions. The trains will be assembled in Thunder Bay, Ontario, and tested in Kingston, Ontario.

=== Driverless train stock ===
The Ontario Line will use standard-gauge train sets smaller than those used on Lines 1, 2, and 4. By using driverless trains with automatic train control (ATC), Metrolinx expects the line to be as frequent as the existing subway lines despite using smaller, lighter trains. In conjunction with ATC, stations will have platform screen doors for safety, also allowing riders to exit and enter trains more quickly. The trains will be manufactured by Hitachi Rail, similar to trains in the Copenhagen Metro or Line C of the Rome Metro.

=== Light metro stock ===
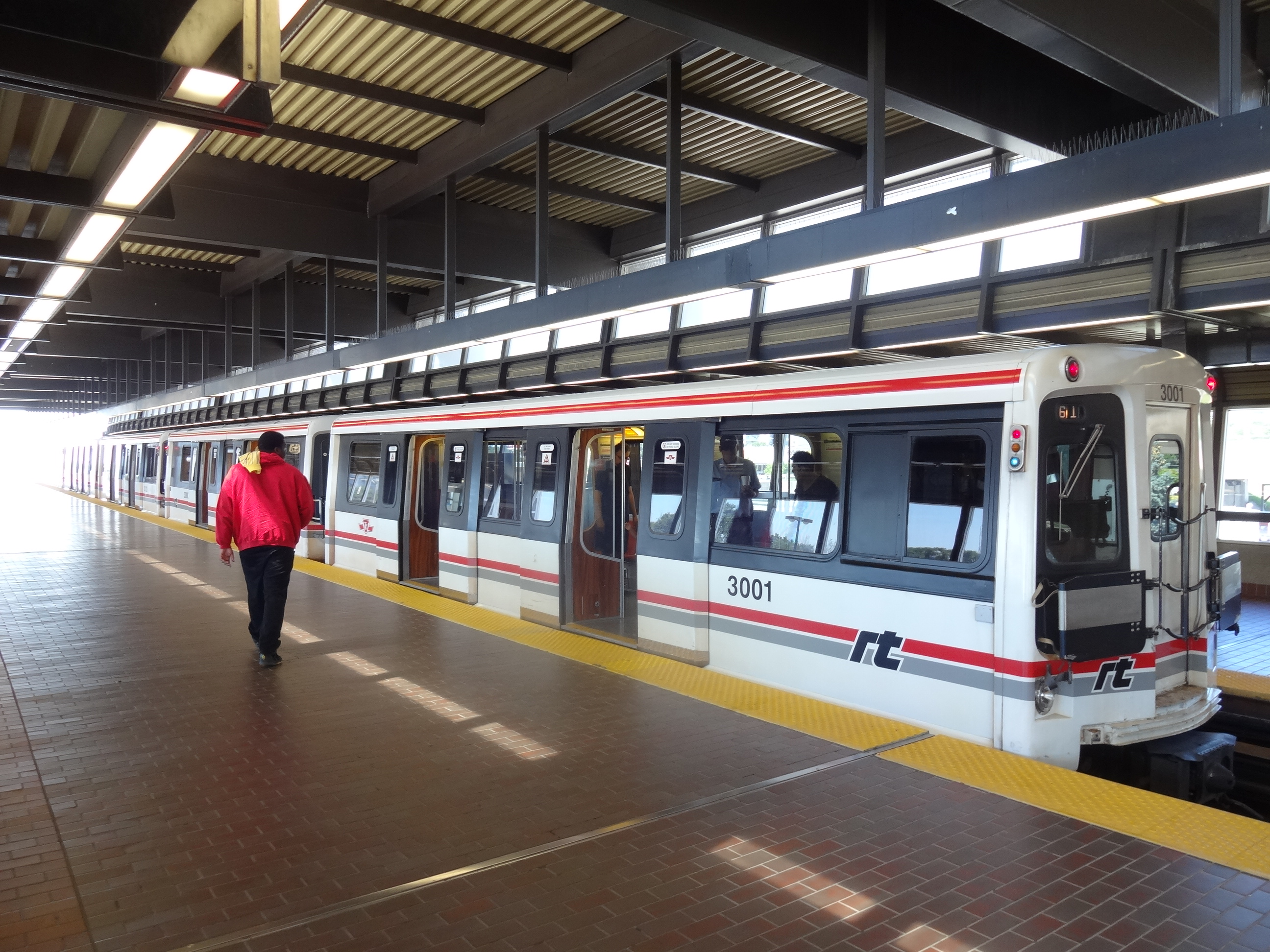
An S-series train leaving Kennedy station on Line 3 Scarborough in 2013. The S series was used exclusively on Line 3. The train was photographed in its original livery that was used between 1985 and 2015.

Line 3 Scarborough used 28 S-series trains built by the Urban Transportation Development Corporation (UTDC) in Millhaven, Ontario. These Intermediate Capacity Transit System (ICTS) trains were Mark I models, similar in design to the original trains found on the Vancouver SkyTrain and the Detroit People Mover. These were the original vehicles on the line and were in service from the line's opening in 1985 to its closure in 2023. Because of the trains' age, they were refurbished for operation and initially intended to last until the extension of Line 2 Bloor–Danforth was built. In February 2021, the TTC announced plans to accelerate the retirement of Line 3, intending to close it in 2023. This was due to delays in planning and construction of the Line 2 extension (which was then projected to open in 2030 at the earliest) along with the increasing difficulty of performing critical maintenance work on the trains. Following an initial temporary closure owing to a derailment in July 2023, the TTC decided in August 2023 not to reopen the line. The TTC proposed selling some of these trains to the Detroit People Mover, which uses a similar technology in December 2023. The sale was finalized in June 2024, with repairs and upgrades paid by the Detroit People Mover.

=== Light rail stock ===
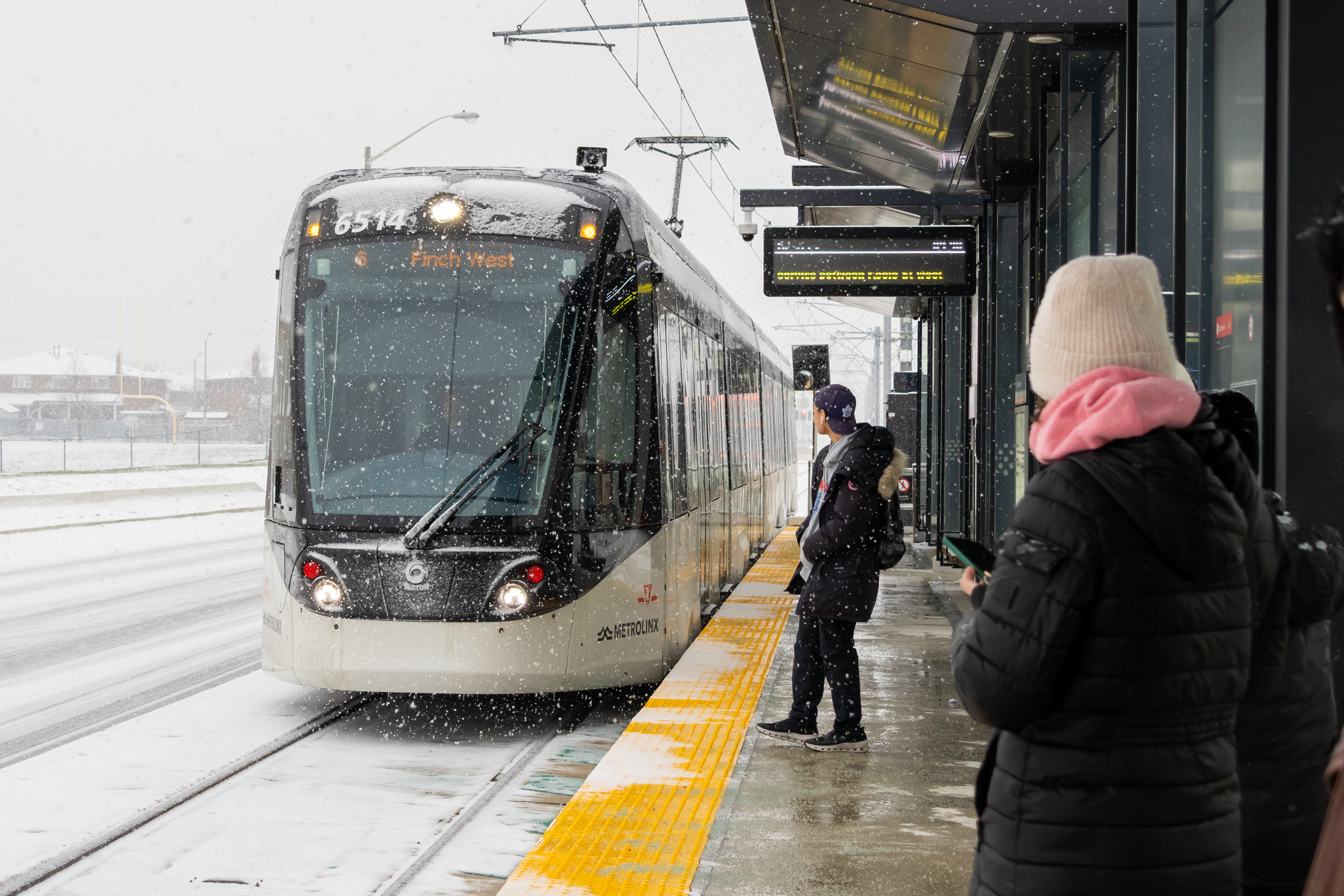
Citadis Spirit LRV at Martin Grove stop on Line 6 Finch West

Line 5 Eglinton operates using 76 Flexity Freedom low-floor, light-rail vehicles (LRVs) owned by Metrolinx. Due to delivery delays from Bombardier, Metrolinx reduced the order for Flexity Freedom vehicles and instead uses 17 Citadis Spirit vehicles on Line 6 Finch West.

Comparison of light rail vehicles
| Vehicle | Citadis Spirit | Flexity Freedom |
|---|---|---|
| Length | 48.4 m (159 ft) | 31.9 m (105 ft) |
| Maximum capacity | 292 | 164 |
| Maximum speed | 100 km/h (62 mph) | 80 km/h (50 mph) |

== Technology ==
| Technology | Lines used | Vehicle floor type | Track gauge | Line voltage | Electrical feed | Electrical pickup |
|---|---|---|---|---|---|---|
| Heavy rail | Line 1 Yonge–University Line 2 Bloor–Danforth Line 4 Sheppard | High floor | 4 ft 10 7/8 in (1,495 mm) Toronto gauge | 600 V DC | Third rail | Bogie-mounted contact shoe |
| Light rail | Line 5 Eglinton Line 6 Finch West | Low floor | 1,435 mm (4 ft 8 1/2 in) standard gauge | 750 V DC | Overhead wire | Roof-mounted pantograph |

The heavy rail lines have some characteristics in common: such lines are fully isolated from road traffic and pedestrians; the station platforms are covered, and the trains are boarded through many doors from high platforms within a fare-paid zone separated by faregates.

In contrast, the surface portions of the light rail lines (Lines 5 and 6) fit into the street environment. Light-rail tracks are located on the surface within reserved lanes in the middle of the street, and cross street intersections at grade. Surface stations have simple, low-level platforms. However, like heavy rail and light metro, passengers board and alight the light rail trains by multiple doors.

Line 3 Scarborough, a light metro, used a more complex technology than heavy rail, which a TTC document describes as follows:

Track is the 5 rail system on direct fixation and car is powered by an induction or "reaction rail" situated between the running rails at the same top of rail elevation. There are two side contacting power rails +300V and −300V respectively situated a distance of about 14 in. from the closest gauge line of one running rail.

== Signals ==
=== Heavy rail ===
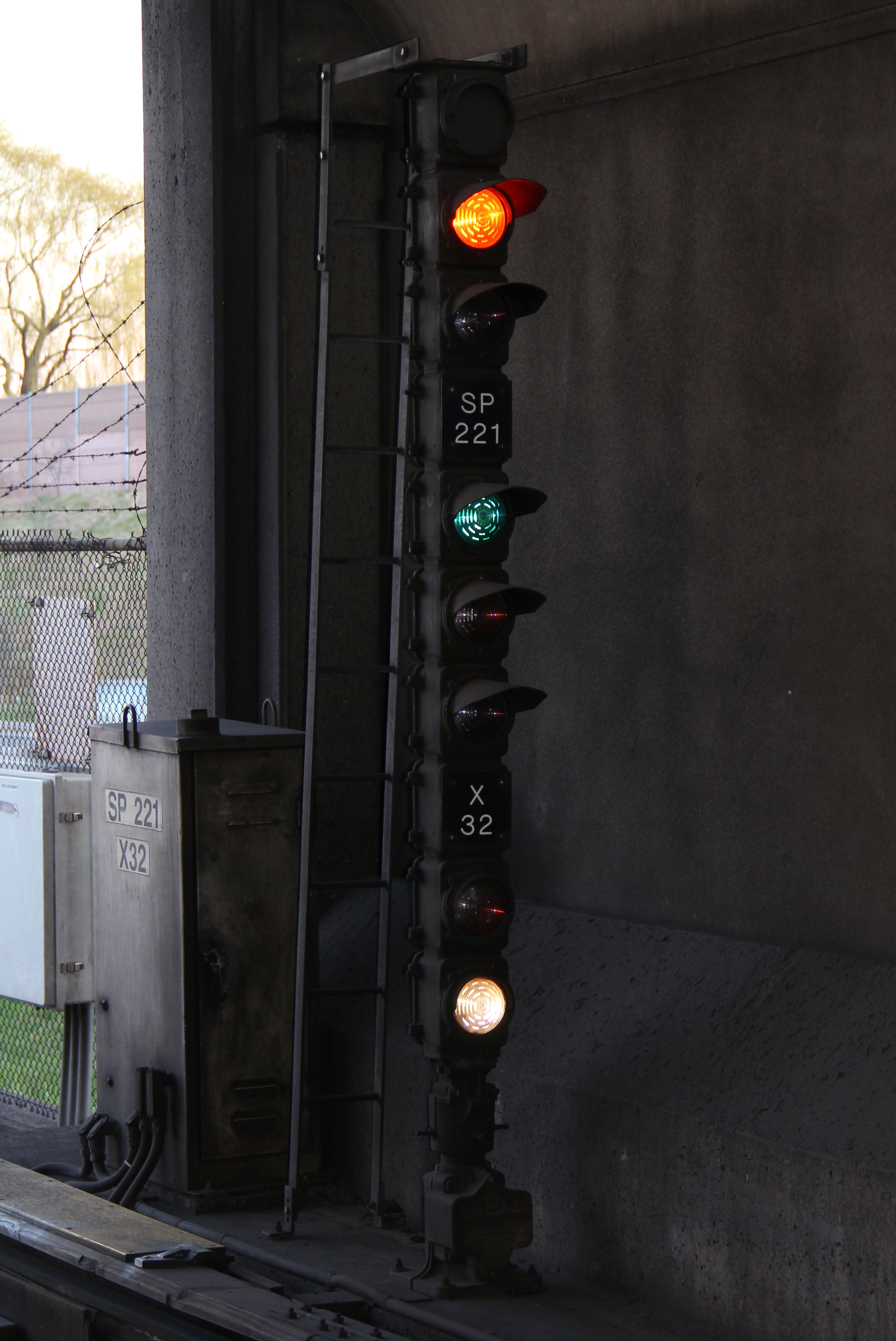
An interlocking signal used along Lines 2 and 4 and formerly along Line 1

Fixed-block signalling was originally used on Toronto's first subway line in 1954 and was the first signalling system used on Lines 2 and 4. As of 2022, Lines 2 and 4 use fixed-block signalling but Line 1 no longer does. Fixed-block signalling uses automatic signalling to prevent rear-end train collisions, while interlocking signals are used to prevent collisions from conflicting movements on track crossovers.

As of September 24, 2022, automatic train control (ATC) has been implemented along the entire length of Line 1. In 2009, the TTC awarded a contract to Alstom to upgrade the signalling system of the existing section of Line 1, as well as equip its extension into Vaughan, with moving block–based communications-based train control (CBTC) by 2012. The estimated cost to implement ATC on Line 1 was $562 million, $424 million of which was funded by Metrolinx. The first section of the "Urbalis 400" ATC system on Line 1 entered revenue service on December 17, 2017, between Sheppard West and Vaughan stations, in conjunction with the opening of the Toronto–York Spadina subway extension (TYSSE) project.

The benefits of ATC on Line 1 are:

- a reduced headway between trains from 2.5 minutes to 2 minutes during rush hours, allowing a 25 percent increase in the number of trains that can operate
- fewer signal-related delays relative to the old fixed-block system
- more efficient use of electricity, thus reducing operational costs
- allowing single-track, bidirectional operation for trains in passenger service, albeit with reduced frequency, to allow for off-hour maintenance of the opposite track

The TTC has plans to convert Line 2 to ATC by 2030, subject to the availability of funding.

=== Driverless train ===
The future Ontario Line will use automatic train control with driverless trains. Its stations will be equipped with platform screen doors.

=== Light rail ===
Line 5 Eglinton uses Bombardier Transportation's Cityflo 650 CBTC automatic train control on the underground section of the line between Laird station and Mount Dennis station, along with the Eglinton Maintenance and Storage Facility adjacent to Mount Dennis station.

=== Former light metro ===
Line 3 Scarborough was equipped with automatic train control from the outset, using the same SelTrac IS system as Vancouver's SkyTrain, meaning it could be operated autonomously. However, the TTC opted to equip each S-series train with an operator on board for door monitoring.

== Track ==
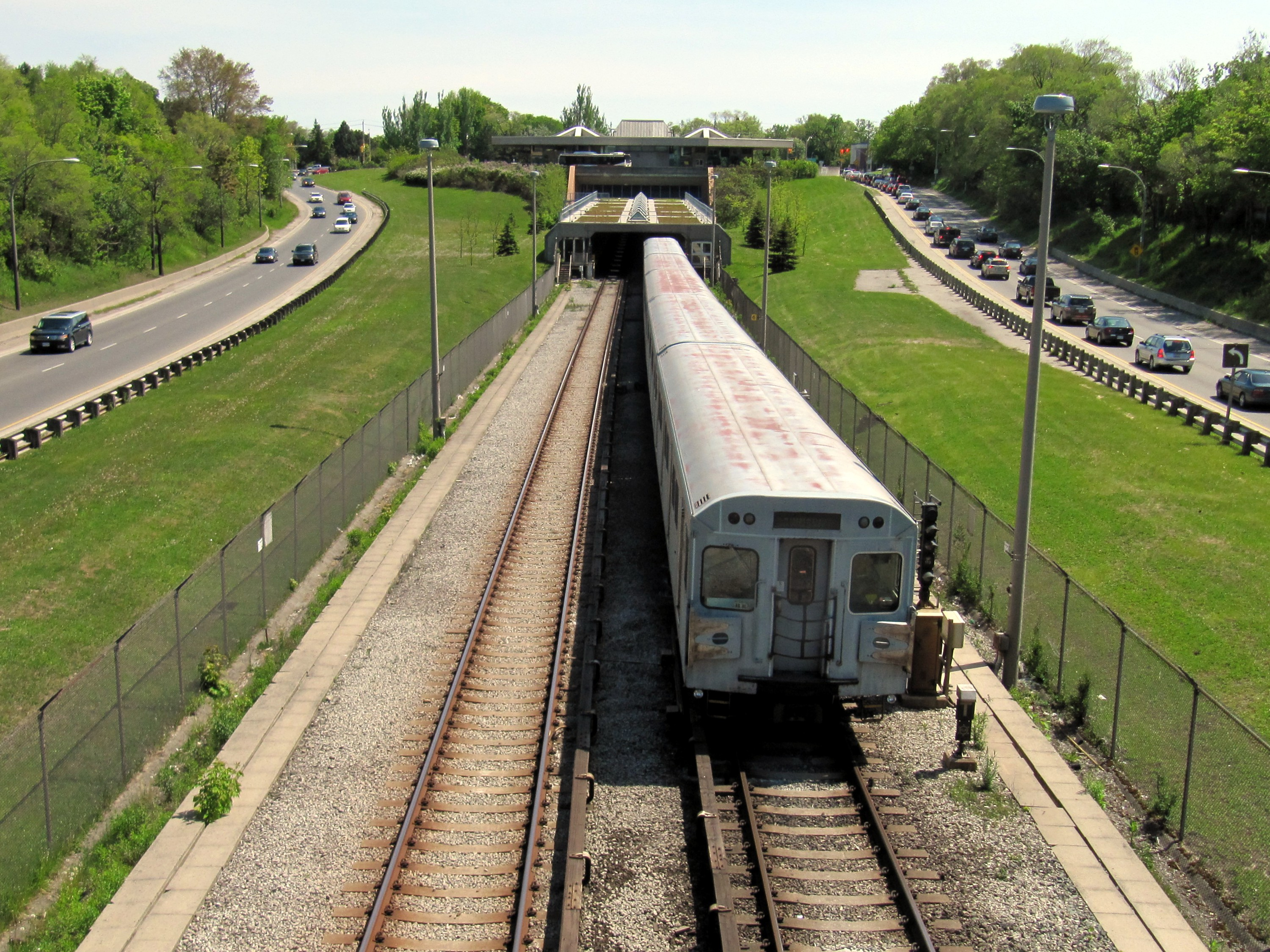
Southbound train in the median of Allen Road towards Eglinton West station in 2010. Subway tracks in Toronto were built to 4 ft 10 7/8 in (1,495 mm), the same gauge used by the TTC's streetcar system.

Lines 1, 2 and 4 – the heavy-rail lines – run on tracks built to the Toronto gauge of 4 ft 10 7/8 in (1,495 mm), the same gauge used on the Toronto streetcar system. According to rail historians John F. Bromley and Jack May, the reason that the Yonge subway was built to the streetcar gauge was that between 1954 and 1965, subway bogies were maintained at the Hillcrest Complex, where the streetcar gauge was used for shop tracks. The Davisville Carhouse was not equipped to perform such heavy maintenance, and the bogies would be loaded onto a specially built track trailer for shipment between Davisville and Hillcrest. This practice ceased with the opening of the shops at the Greenwood Yard in 1965.

Line 3 Scarborough used standard-gauge tracks, as the ICTS design for the line did not allow for the interchange of rail equipment between the traditional subway system and Line 3. When its ICTS vehicles needed anything more than basic service (which could be carried out at the McCowan Yard), they were carried by truck to the Greenwood Subway Yard.

The Line 5 Eglinton and Line 6 Finch West light rail lines were constructed using standard-gauge tracks. The projects received large parts of their funding from the Ontario provincial transit authority Metrolinx, who wanted to have a degree of commonality with other similar projects within Ontario to ensure a better price for purchasing vehicles. The Ontario Line subway will similarly be built to standard gauge.

== Facilities ==
The subway system has the following yards to provide storage, maintenance and cleaning for rolling stock. All yards are located above ground, though the Keele Yard is partially underground.

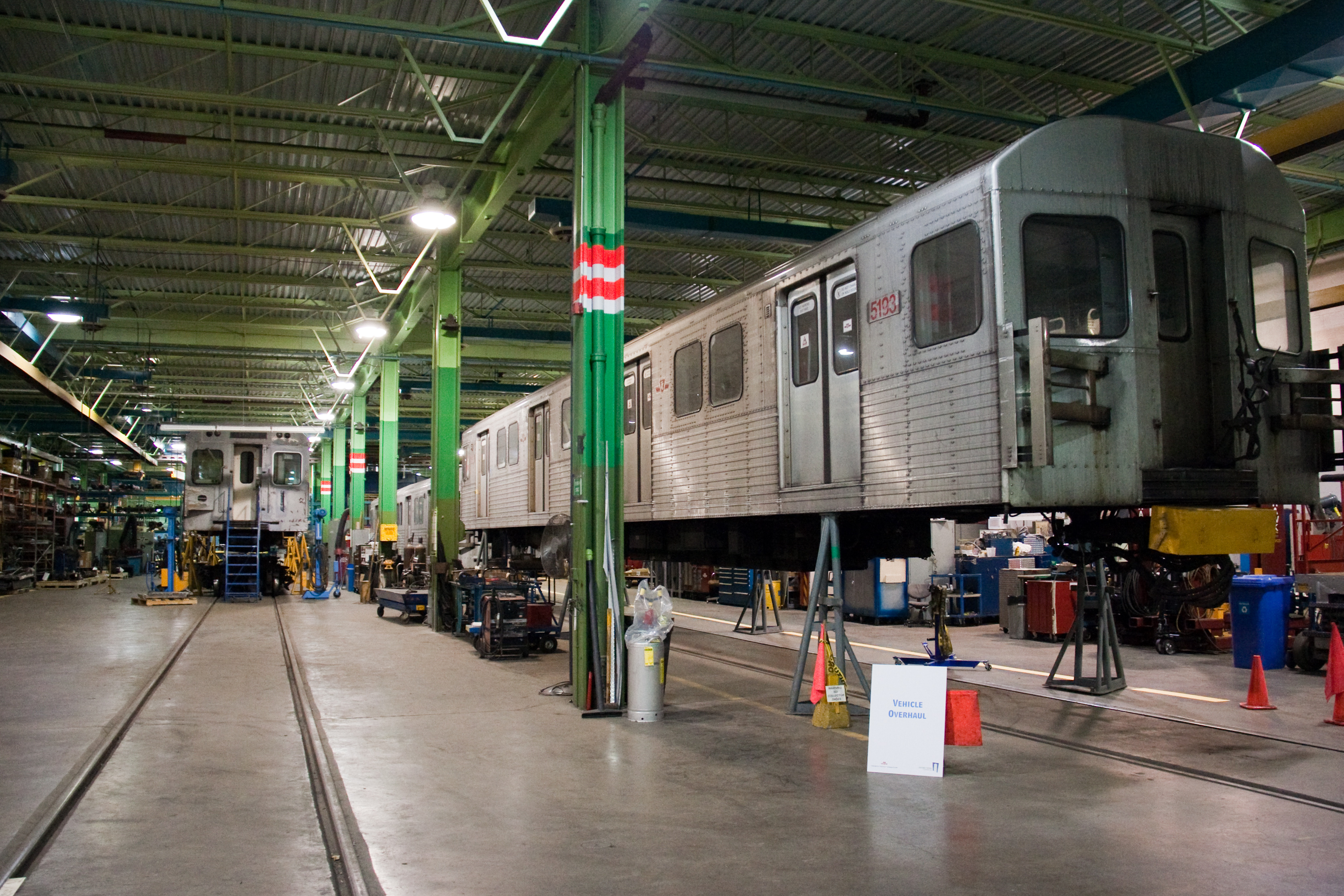
T-series trains being overhauled at Greenwood Yard, one of several rail yards operated by the TTC

| Facilities | Opened | Lines served | Remarks |
|---|---|---|---|
| Davisville Yard | 1954 | Line 1 Yonge–University Line 4 Sheppard | |
| Eglinton MSF | 2026 | Line 5 Eglinton | |
| Finch MSF | 2025 | Line 6 Finch West | |
| Greenwood Yard | 1966 | Line 2 Bloor–Danforth | |
| Keele Yard | 1966–1978; 2017 | Line 2 Bloor–Danforth | Closed in 1978; reopened June 18, 2017 |
| McCowan Yard | 1985–2023 | Line 3 Scarborough | Line decommissioned |
| Wilson Yard | 1977 | Line 1 Yonge–University | |

In the second quarter of 2018, the City of Toronto moved to expropriate Canadian Pacific Railway's disused Obico Yard at 30 Newbridge Road / 36 North Queen Street in Etobicoke for use as a potential future yard at the western end of Line 2 Bloor–Danforth. The yard is situated immediately to the southwest of Kipling station, the western terminus of Line 2.

== Safety ==
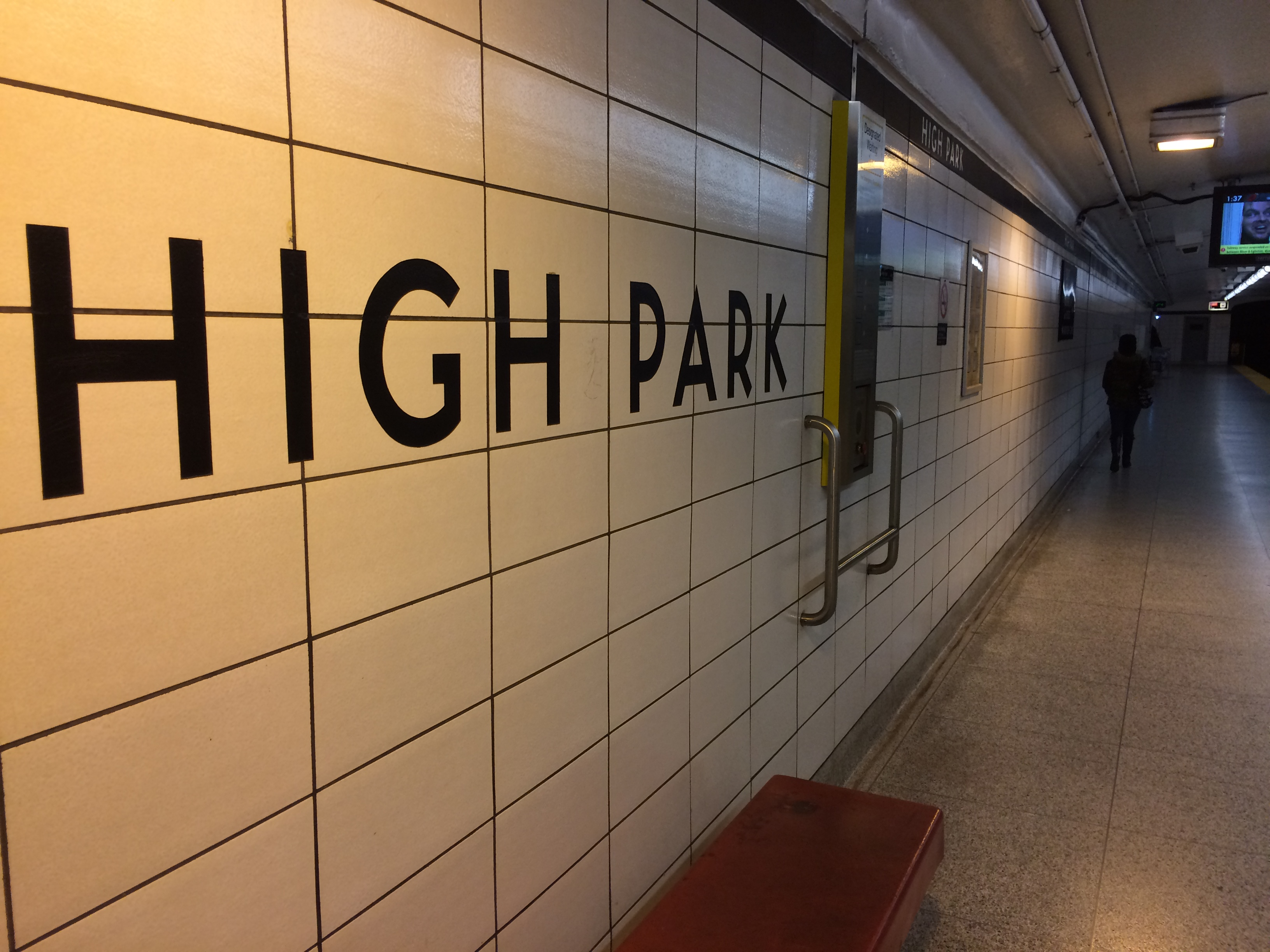
Designated waiting area at High Park station with a passenger intercom if TTC staff or security needs to be contacted

There are several safety systems for use by passengers in emergencies:

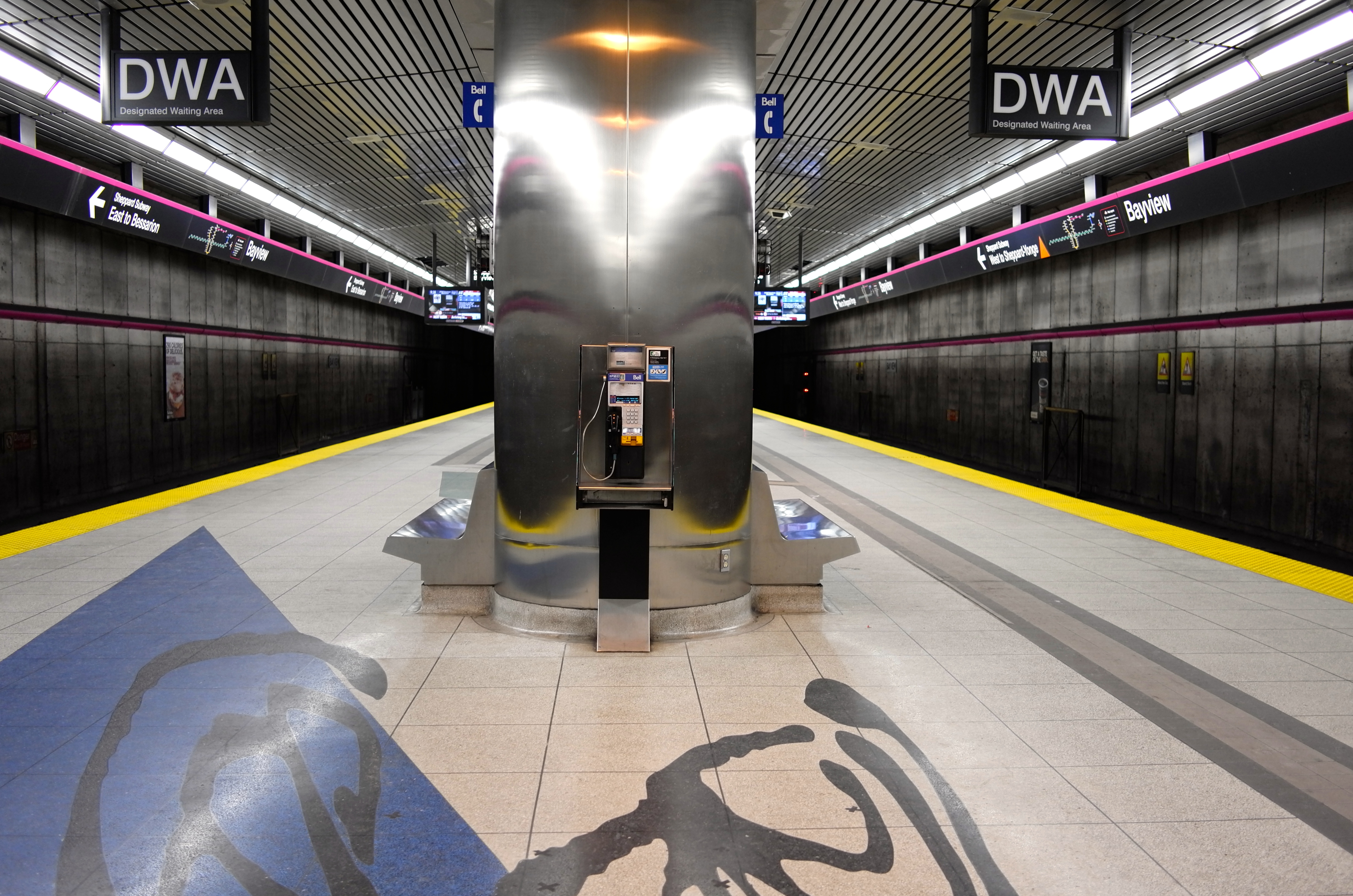
A public payphone at a designated waiting area in Bayview station

- Emergency alarms (formerly "Passenger assistance alarms"): Located throughout all subway trains – When the yellow strip is pressed, an audible alarm is activated within the car, a notification is sent to the train crew and the Transit Control Centre, which in turn dispatches a tiered response. An orange light is activated on the outside of the car with the alarm for emergency personnel to see where the problem is.
- Emergency power cut devices: Marked by a blue light, located at both ends of each subway platform – For use to cut DC traction power in the event a person falls or is observed at track level or any emergency where train movement into the station would be dangerous. These devices cut power in both directions for approximately one station each way.
- Emergency stopping mechanisms (PGEV: passenger/guard emergency valve): Located at each end on Line 2 subway cars, will activate the emergency brakes of the vehicle stopping it in its current location (for use in extreme emergencies, such as persons trapped in doors as train departs station, doors opening in the tunnel, derailments etc.)
- Passenger intercoms: Located on subway platforms and near/in elevators in stations – For use to inform station collector of security/life safety issues
- Automated external defibrillators (AEDs): Located in several subway stations near collector booths – For use in the event someone suffers cardiac arrest
- Public telephones: Located in various locations in all stations, and at the Designated Waiting Area's on each subway platform. Emergency calls can be made to 911 toll free. Phones located at the DWAs also include a "Crisis Link" button that connect callers, free of charge, to a 24-hour crisis line in the event that they are contemplating self-harm. Bell Canada operates these phones.

Stations with high platforms have a crawl space under the platform edge, which the TTC recommends that a person who has fallen onto the track use to avoid an oncoming train. Lying flat between the two rails is not recommended due to shallow clearances. The platform edge has a yellow strip behind which passengers should wait to avoid a fall.

Stations do not have platform screen doors, a feature which for Lines 1, 2 and 4 would require station modification, automatic train control (ATC) and a $1.35-billion investment, which is not funded as of 2022. Funding for platform screen doors and supporting technology was not before city council as of 2026 due to a lack of public support for such a large capital expenditure with debated value. ATC is needed to stop trains at a precise position along the platform to line up train doors with platform doors. Since September 24, 2022, ATC has been activated along the entire length of Line 1; thus, it would be possible to install platform screen doors along Line 1. The future Ontario Line will be built to operate with ATC and will feature platform screen doors from its opening. The benefits of platform doors would be:

- Blocking those attempting suicide or trespassers from the tracks: it takes 70 to 90 minutes to resume operations each time there is a personal injury at track level
- Eliminating fires from debris falling on the tracks and the third rail
- Allowing trains to enter crowded stations at speed, thus speeding up service along the line

The light-rail Line 5 Eglinton uses a guideway intrusion detection system (GIDS) to detect trespassers on the tracks on the underground sections of the line. When GIDS detects a trespasser on the tracks, it issues an audio warning to the trespasser, provide live CCTV video to central control, and automatically stop the train without driver intervention. Each station is equipped with multiple GIDS scanners along the station platform. There are GIDS scanners at each tunnel portal. In addition, there are scanners within the yellow tactile strips along the platform edge to issue an audio warning if a person steps on it before the train has arrived.

A trial program began in 2008 with Toronto EMS and has been expanded and made permanent, with paramedics on hand at several stations during peak hours: Spadina and Bloor–Yonge (morning peak: 7 am–10 am) and Union and Eglinton (evening peak: 2 pm–6 pm).

By September 2023, the TTC was making naloxone available at each subway station so that designated trained TTC staff could attempt to rescue anyone having a drug overdose. Kits containing naloxone nasal spray would be stored at station collector booths. TTC special constables would carry naloxone.

== Training ==
Subway operators begin their training at Hillcrest with a virtual reality mockup of a Toronto Rocket car. The simulator consists of the operator cab with full functions, a door and partial interior of a subway car. The simulator is housed in a simulated subway tunnel. Construction of a new subway training centre was underway at the Wilson Complex, as part of the Toronto Rocket subway car program.

== Expansion plans ==
Proposed lines and extensions
| Line | Opening | Stations | Length | Technology | Track gauge | Electrification |
|---|---|---|---|---|---|---|
| Eglinton East LRT | 2034 | 27 | 18.6 km (11.6 mi) | Light rail | Standard gauge (1,435 mm) | 750 V DC overhead line |
| Sheppard east extension | TBD | TBD | TBD | Heavy rail | Toronto gauge (1,495 mm) | 600 V DC third rail |
| Sheppard west extension | TBD | TBD | TBD | Heavy rail | Toronto gauge (1,495 mm) | 600 V DC third rail |
| Pearson Airport extension | TBD | TBD | TBD | Light rail | Standard gauge (1,435 mm) | 750 V DC overhead line |
| Pearson Airport extension | TBD | TBD | TBD | Light rail | Standard gauge (1,435 mm) | 750 V DC overhead line |

=== Provincially supported projects ===
Future Toronto subway system map after lines under construction in 2026 are completed circa 2035

On April 10, 2019, Ontario premier Doug Ford announced rapid transit–related projects that the Province of Ontario would support with either committed or future financing. One such project is the Ontario Line, a proposed 15.5-kilometre (9.6 mi) rapid transit line that has succeeded the Relief Line proposal. Initially, the project was projected to be completed in 2027, but this was later pushed back to 2030. A groundbreaking ceremony for the Ontario Line was held on March 27, 2022.

Sheppard/McCowan station on the Scarborough subway extension under construction in October 2026

The Scarborough subway extension (SSE) is a project to replace Line 3 Scarborough with an eastward extension of Line 2 Bloor–Danforth. On October 8, 2013, Toronto City Council debated whether to replace Line 3 with a light rail line or a subway extension. In 2014, the city council voted to extend Line 2 to Scarborough City Centre, which would result in the closure of Line 3. The SSE would be 6 kilometres (3.7 mi) long and add one new station to Line 2 at Scarborough Town Centre. TTC and city staff finalized the precise route of the SSE in early 2017. In 2019, the Government of Ontario proposed a modified version of the proposal now known as the Line 2 East Extension (L2EE). The L2EE is 7.8 kilometres (4.8 mi) long and adds three new stations, rather than one. As of 2026, the project is under construction; in 2019, the estimated completion deadline was between 2029 and 2030.

Launch shaft for the YNSE south of Highway 407, with the tunnel boring machines being assembled in October 2026

The Yonge North subway extension (YNSE) is a project to extend Line 1 Yonge–University north along Yonge Street from Finch station, the existing terminus of Line 1, to near Highway 7 in Richmond Hill. There will be new stations at Steeles Avenue, Clark Avenue, between Highway 7 and Highway 407 near Langstaff GO Station and Richmond Hill Centre Terminal (dubbed "Bridge station"), and High Tech Road. The extension was proposed in the province's 2007 MoveOntario 2020 plan. A major problem with this proposal was that Line 1 was at capacity, and the TTC said in 2016 that the proposed Relief Line and SmartTrack would both need to be in service before opening the YNSE. In 2020, a preliminary agreement was signed between the Ontario provincial government and York Region that at the time anticipated the completion of the extension by approximately 2030. Construction began in the second quarter of 2026 with excavation of the launch shaft near Highway 407 and the arrival of the tunnel boring machines.

The Line 4 eastward extension to McCowan is a proposal to extend Line 4 Sheppard east along Sheppard Avenue East to McCowan Road, where it will connect with the Scarborough subway extension. Doug Ford said in April 2019 that he would commit funds related to this proposal.

The Line 5 west extension to Pearson Airport is a proposal to extend Line 5 Eglinton from its terminus at Mount Dennis station west along Eglinton Avenue West to the proposed Pearson Transit Hub in Mississauga. In April 2019, Ford said that he would commit funds for this proposal.

=== Other active proposals ===
The Eglinton East LRT is a City of Toronto proposal to construct an LRT line (separate from Line 5 Eglinton) from Kennedy station east to Malvern. This proposal was originally part of the cancelled Scarborough–Malvern LRT in Transit City. It would have stations at Eglinton GO and Guildwood GO, as well as the University of Toronto Scarborough campus.

=== Inactive proposals ===
The Jane LRT is a proposed LRT line that would begin at Jane station on Line 2 and proceed north to Pioneer Village station on Line 1. While initially part of the cancelled Transit City plan, the Jane LRT is part of the 2018–2022 TTC Corporate Plan and tentatively referred to as Line 8.

The Line 6 west extension to Pearson Airport is a proposal that would extend Line 6 Finch West west to Pearson Airport, where it would provide a link to Line 5 Eglinton. In 2009, the TTC studied the feasibility of potential routings for a future westward extension of the Etobicoke–Finch West LRT to the vicinity of the Woodbine Live development, Woodbine Mall, and Pearson International Airport. This extension was later reclassified as a future transit project as described in the 2013 Feeling Congested? report by the City of Toronto. Metrolinx revealed in January 2020 that they would study a possible connection to the Pearson Transit Hub at Pearson Airport.

=== Abandoned plans ===
The Queen subway line was a subway line first proposed in 1911. When Line 1 was first built, a roughed-in station was included under Queen station, with the intention that the Queen subway would be the city's second subway line. The route of the Queen subway line is included in the routes for both the Relief Line and the Ontario Line proposals.

The Eglinton West line was a proposed subway line in the late 1980s on which construction began in the early 1990s. It was cancelled after the election of Mike Harris as premier of Ontario. Much of its planned route is included in Line 5 Eglinton.

One proposed expansion of Line 2 Bloor–Danforth into Mississauga included eight potential stations stretching west from Kipling station to Mississauga City Centre, retrofitting some existing GO Transit stations. The plan was for the subway stations to open in 2011. Then–Mississauga mayor Hazel McCallion and the Regional Municipality of Peel did not support the project.

The Relief Line was a proposed heavy-rail subway line running from Pape station south to Queen Street East and then west to the vicinity of Toronto City Hall. The proposal included intermediate stations at Sherbourne Street, Sumach Street, Broadview Avenue, and another near Gerrard Square. In January 2016, alignment options and possible stations were still being studied, and the project was unfunded. Construction was expected to take about ten years to complete. As early as 2008, Metrolinx chair Rob MacIsaac expressed the intent to construct the Relief Line to prevent overcrowding along Line 1. Toronto City Council also expressed support for this plan. In April 2019, the Government of Ontario under Doug Ford announced that the Ontario Line would be built instead of the Relief Line. As a result, TTC and City of Toronto staff suspended further planning work on the Relief Line in June 2019.

==== Transit City ====
The Sheppard East LRT was a proposed light rail line running east from Don Mills station to Morningside Avenue in Scarborough. The line was to be 13 kilometres (8.1 mi) long with 25 surface stations and one underground connection at Don Mills station on Line 4 Sheppard. Construction of the Sheppard East LRT was to start upon completion of Line 6 Finch West. However, in July 2016, the Toronto Star reported the Sheppard LRT had been deferred indefinitely. In April 2019, Premier Doug Ford announced that the provincial government would extend Line 4 Sheppard to McCowan Road at some unspecified time in the future, replacing the proposed Sheppard East LRT.

The Don Mills LRT was a proposed LRT line that would have headed north from Pape station along Don Mills Road to Don Mills station. Its route was later incorporated into the Relief Line and Ontario Line proposals.

== See also ==
- List of metro systems
- Mind the gap
- Path (Toronto)
- Toronto Subway (typeface)
- Transportation in Toronto
