= Pape station =

Toronto subway station

Pape
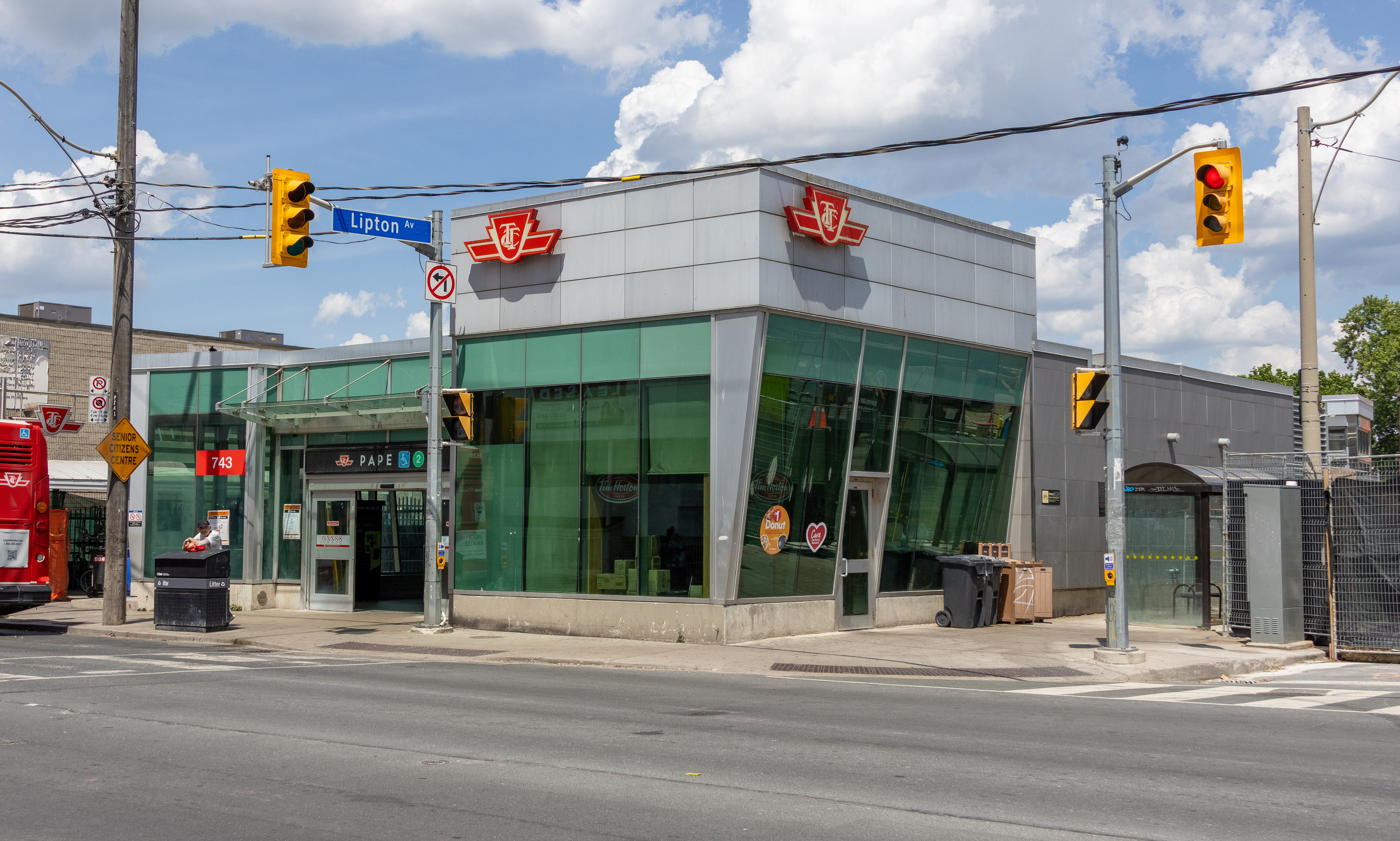
- Station exterior

General information
- Location: 743 Pape Avenue, Toronto, Ontario; Canada
- Coordinates: 43°40′48″N 79°20′42″W
- Platforms: Side platforms
- Tracks: 2
- Connections: TTC buses: 25 Don Mills; 72 Pape; 81 Thorncliffe Park; 300 Bloor - Danforth; 325 Don Mills; 925 Don Mills Express

Construction
- Structure type: Underground
- Cycle facilities: 36 lock-up spaces; 5 ring and posts
- Accessible: Yes

Other information
- Website: Official station page

History
- Opened: Line 2: February 26, 1966; 60 years ago
- Rebuilt: 2009–2013

Passengers
- 2023–2024: 34,506
- Rank: 15 of 70

Services
Preceding station	Toronto Transit Commission	Following station
Chester towards Kipling	Line 2 Bloor–Danforth	Donlands towards Kennedy
Future services
Preceding station	Toronto Transit Commission	Following station
Gerrard towards Exhibition	Ontario Line (opens 2030s)	Cosburn towards Don Valley
Location

Pape is a subway station on Line 2 Bloor–Danforth in Toronto, Ontario, Canada. The station opened in 1966 and is located in Toronto's Greektown neighbourhood at the northeast corner of Pape Avenue and Lipton Avenue, just north of Danforth Avenue. It is located at the site of the former Lipton loop.

The ticket collector's booth and turnstiles are at the surface in the main station building on the southwest corner of the site with a secondary exit/entry structure to the east, adjacent to the parking lot. Bus bays are within the fare-paid zone. Stairs, escalators and elevators connect the ground level, concourse and train platforms. Automatic sliding doors, accessible fare gates and the addition of elevators, made the station became fully accessible in 2013.

== History ==
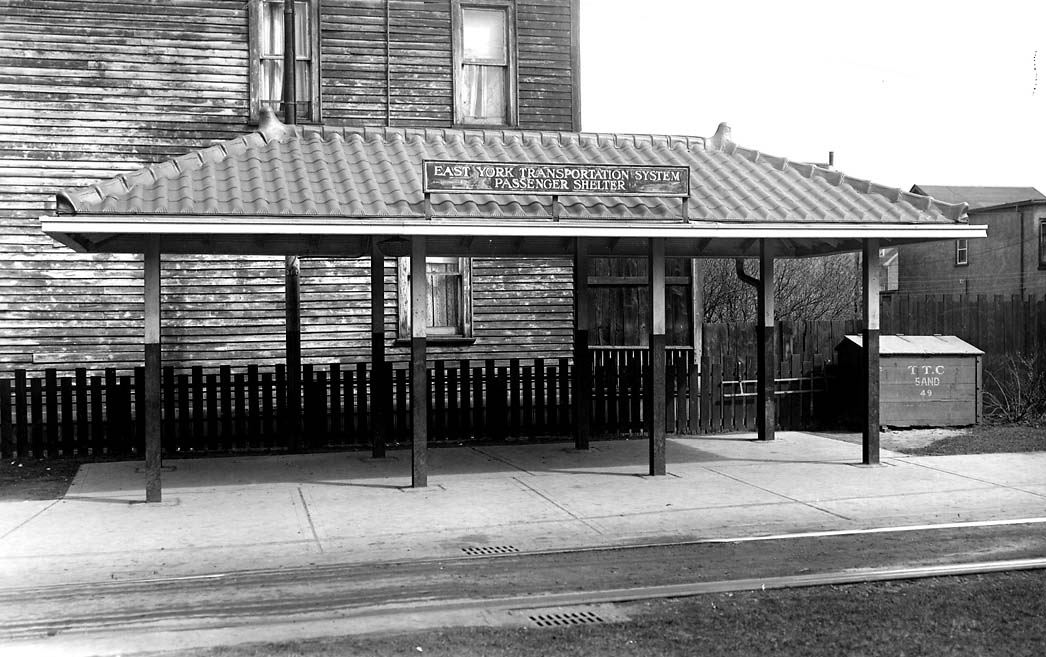
Lipton Loop in 1931

Pape station was formerly the site of the Lipton Loop, which opened in 1927 as the terminus of the discontinued Harbord streetcar route, which ran south on Pape to downtown. The loop also served the 56 Leaside bus route, serving the Leaside neighbourhood. The 56 Leaside was later rerouted to serve Donlands station.

== Nearby landmarks and events ==
The Church of the Holy Name, a prominent architectural landmark, is located nearby.

The Taste of the Danforth street festival takes place for three days in August on the stretch of Danforth west of Pape.

Centennial College's Story Arts Centre, home to Communications, Media and Design programs, is located just north of the station.

== Surface connections ==
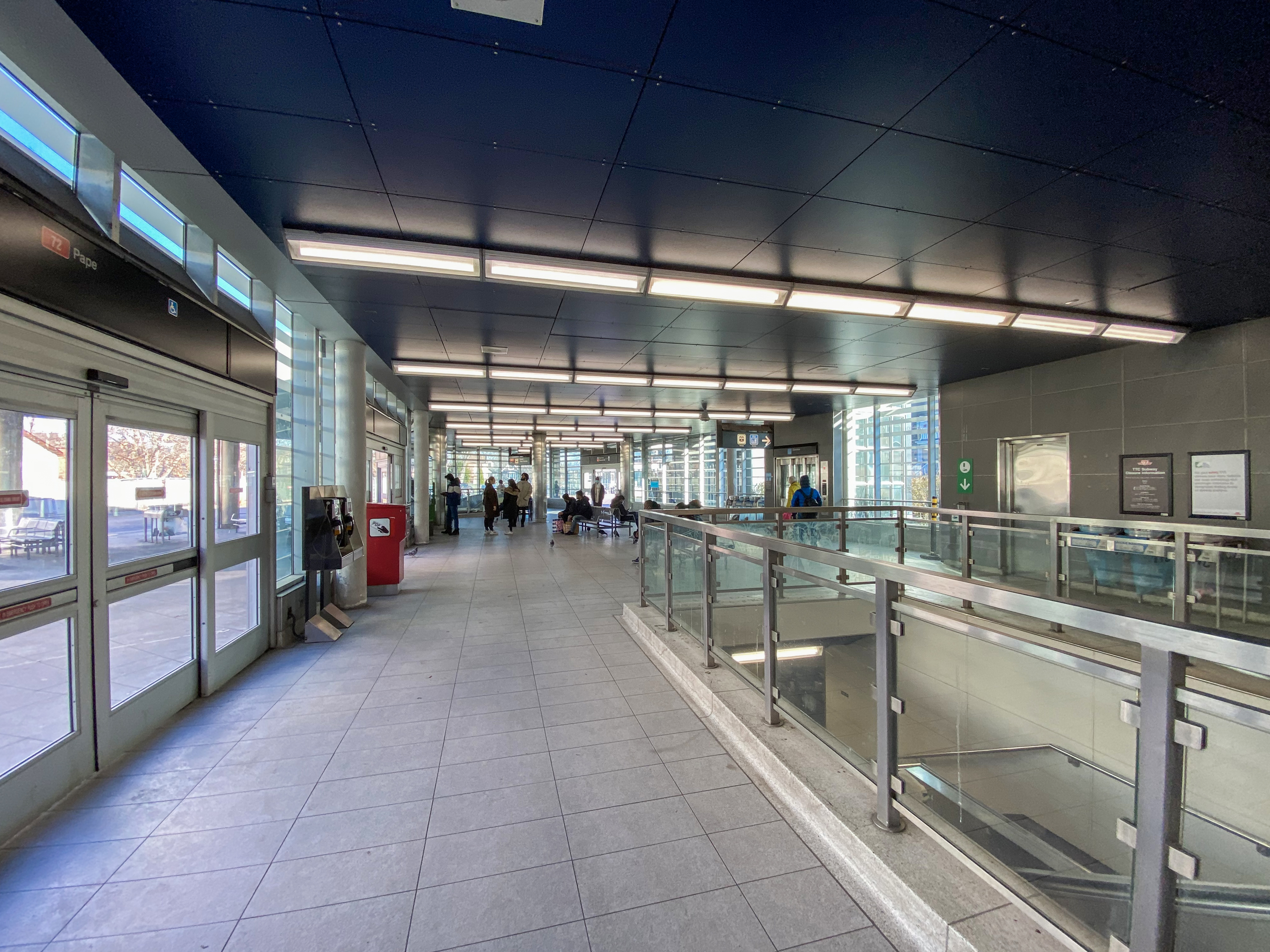
Bus waiting area

Due to construction of the Ontario Line, the bus terminal at Pape station is closed between May 12, 2024, and late 2025.

Route	Name	Additional information
72C	Pape	Northbound to Don Valley station
72C	Pape	Southbound to Commissioners Street
325	Don Mills	Blue Night service; northbound to Steeles Avenue East and southbound to Commissioners Street (On-street transfer)

== Tenants ==
- Tim Hortons

== Station modernization ==
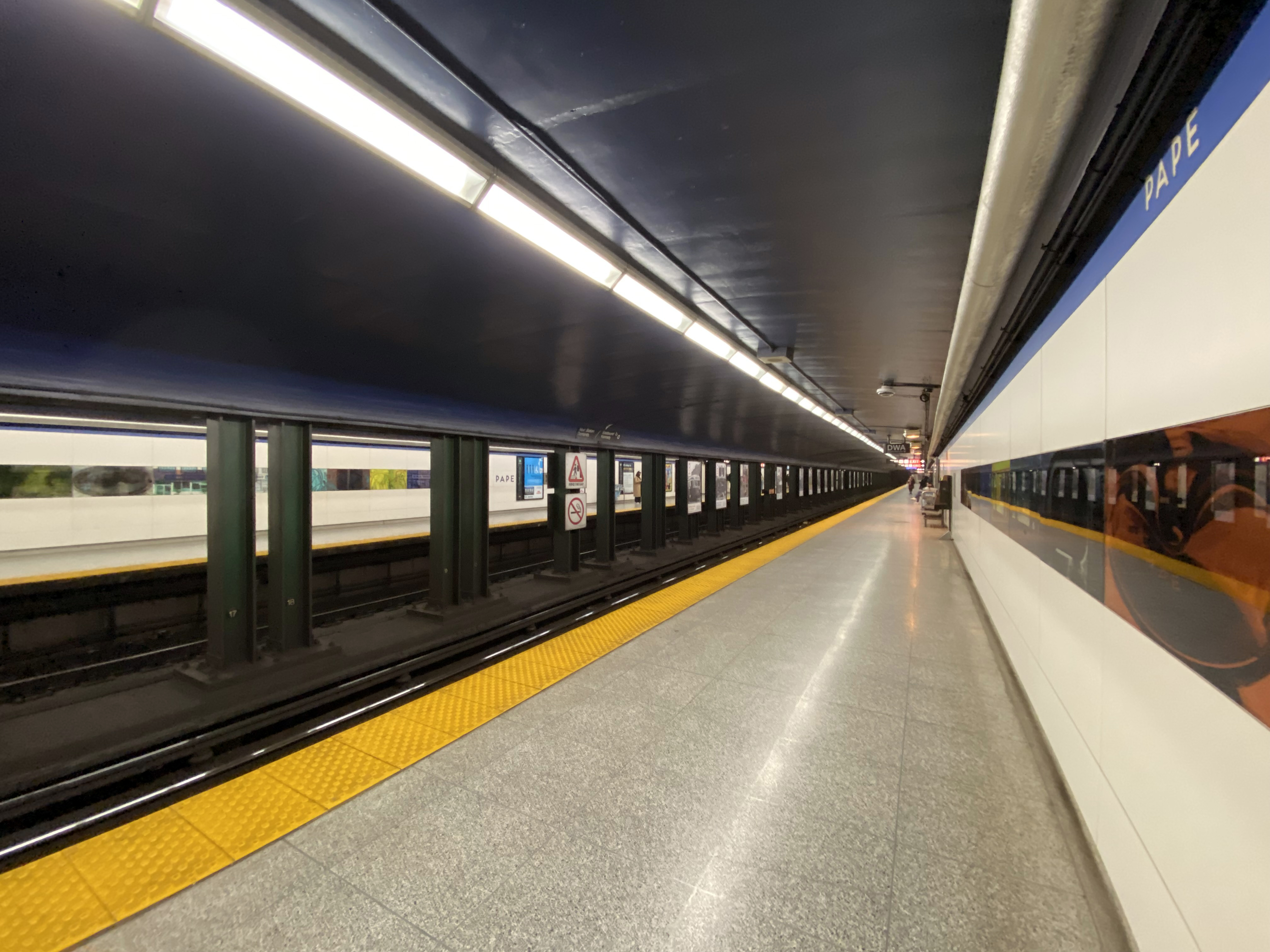
Tile wall installation at the platform

Pape was the first station scheduled to be renovated under a new modernization program, which will update the visual, safety and infrastructure aspects of many older stations. The renovations include adding a second entrance to the platform level, installation of elevators and public art, platform wall renovations, upgraded lights, and improved ventilation and fire safety systems.

The project was scheduled to begin in 2008, but due to delays, the contractor did not mobilize on the site until September 28, 2009.

Construction lasted until 2013. In the spring of that year it was estimated that the renovations would be complete by December. In April, the TTC announced an opinion survey which gave riders three options, continue with the current schedule, speed up renovations by three months by closing the station over six consecutive weekends, or speed up renovations by closing the station for 12 consecutive days. The results were that out of 2,842 respondents, most preferred the third option. The TTC announced that the closure would happen between August 19–30. The closure was originally scheduled for June 15–26, but a strike by the Terrazzo, Tile and Marble Guild of Ontario made it necessary to postpone the closure until the labour dispute was resolved.

The elevators came into operation on October 31, 2013, making the station fully accessible, and on December 23, 2013, the new second exit building opened.

== Future ==
The Toronto Transit Commission has long had plans to construct a Relief Line, connecting the south loop of Line 1 Yonge–University to the east wing of Line 2 Bloor–Danforth. The preferred route of the subway line is from Pape station to Osgoode. Future extensions west of Osgoode and north of Pape would establish Pape as one of the major transit hubs in the Toronto subway system.

Previously, former mayor David Miller proposed the Transit City plan, part of which outlined the Don Mills LRT line, running along Don Mills Road from Don Mills station to Pape station. Along with much of the proposals under that plan, the Don Mills LRT was scrapped by succeeding mayor Rob Ford.

In September 2019, the Government of Ontario announced plans for the Ontario Line, a successor to the Relief Line. The line is planned to intersect with the station. A tentative completion date has been set for 2027. As of July 2020, construction timing and impacts to Pape station have not yet been announced.

The Ontario Line is a planned rapid transit line that will connect Don Valley station (on Line 5 Eglinton) to Exhibition GO Station (on the Lakeshore West GO line). A connection to Line 2 is planned at Pape station. The new platform and tracks will be constructed underneath and perpendicular to the existing Line 2 platforms, slightly to the east of Pape Avenue, to avoid traffic and utility disruptions during construction. As of December 2020, the expected completion date of the Ontario Line is 2030.
