= Don Valley station =

Toronto subway station

Don Valley
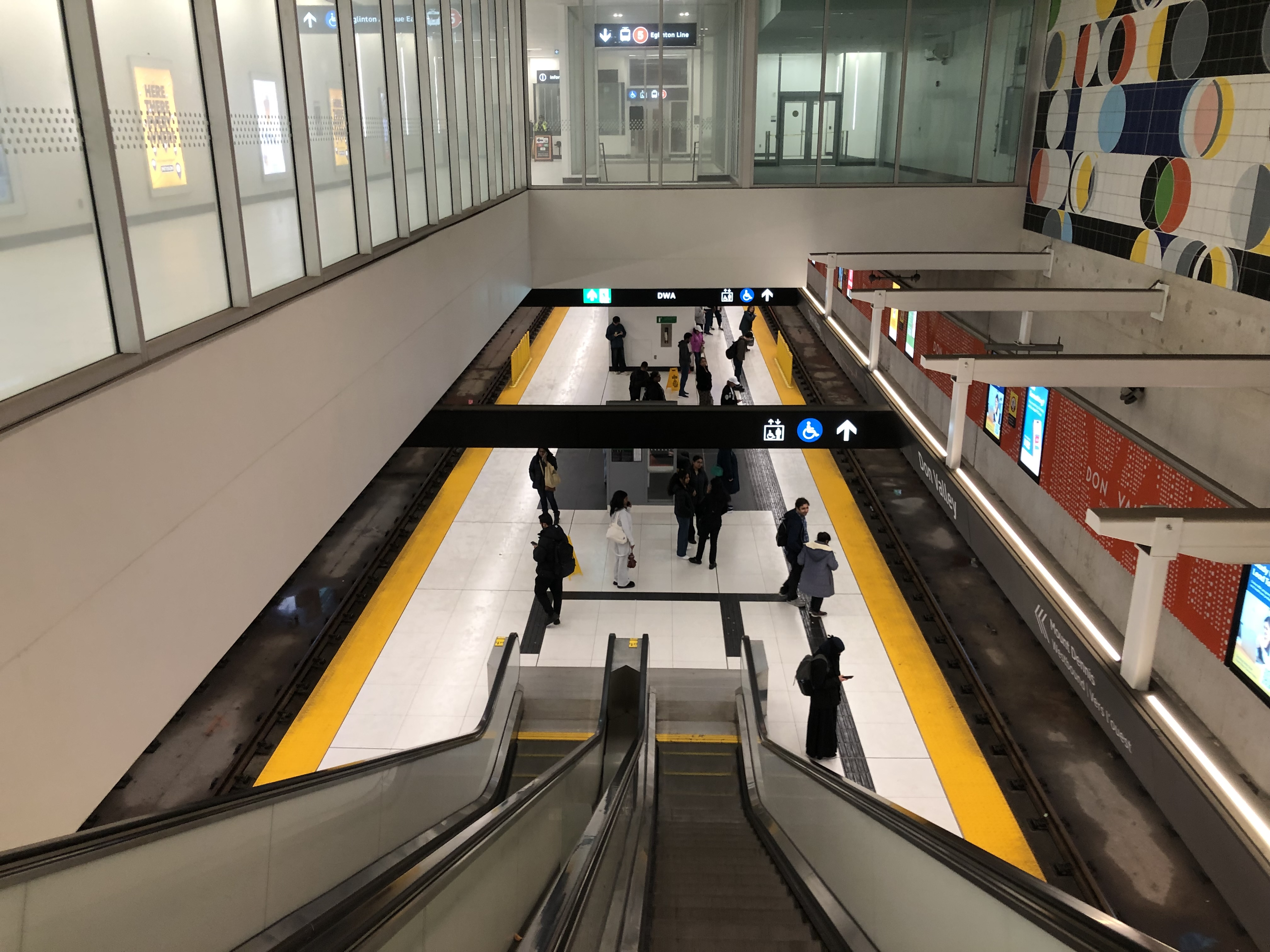
- Station platform and concourse

General information
- Location: 1185 Eglinton Avenue East; Toronto, Ontario; Canada
- Coordinates: 43°43′14″N 79°20′20″W
- Owner: Metrolinx
- Platforms: Centre platform
- Tracks: 2
- Connections: TTC buses: 25 Don Mills; 34 Eglinton; 54 Lawrence East; 72 Pape; 100 Flemingdon Park; 162 Lawrence-Donway; 191 Underhill; 325 Don Mills; 334 Eglinton; 354 Lawrence East; 925 Don Mills Express; 954 Lawrence East Express

Construction
- Structure type: Underground
- Cycle facilities: Indoor bike parking
- Accessible: Yes
- Architect: Arcadis (Line 5)

History
- Opened: Line 5: February 8, 2026; 9 months ago
- Opening: Ontario Line: 2031; 5 years' time

Services
Preceding station	Toronto Transit Commission	Following station
Sunnybrook Park towards Mount Dennis	Line 5 Eglinton	Aga Khan Park & Museum towards Kennedy
Future services
Preceding station	Toronto Transit Commission	Following station
Flemingdon Park towards Exhibition	Ontario Line (opens 2030s)	Terminus
Location

Don Valley is an underground Toronto subway station on Line 5 Eglinton in Toronto, Ontario, Canada. It is located in the Flemingdon Park neighbourhood at the intersection of Don Mills Road and Eglinton Avenue.

On April 10, 2019, the Ontario government announced that Don Valley station, under its planned name Science Centre, would be the northern terminus for the proposed Ontario Line, construction of which began in March 2022.

== Description ==
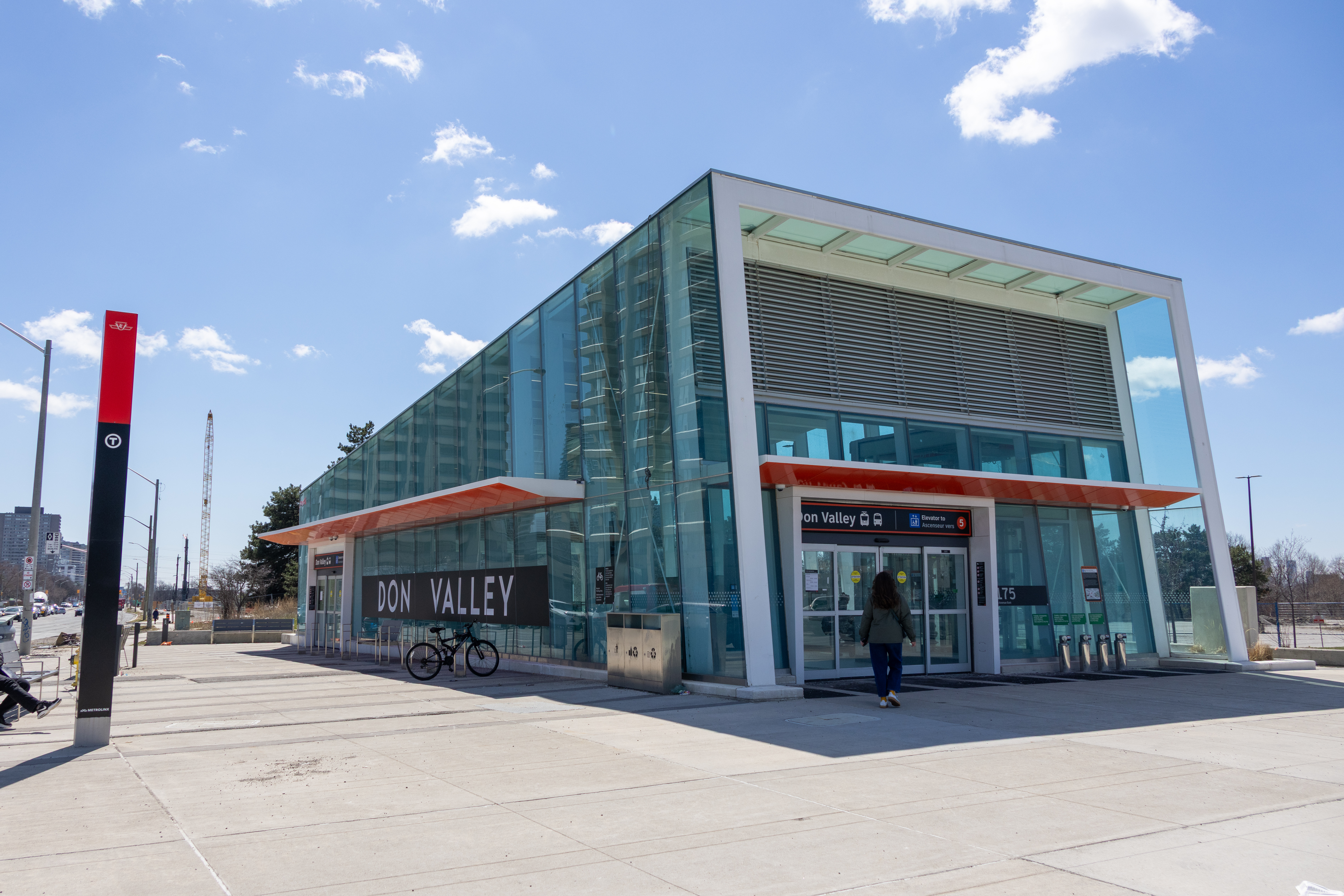
Main entrance to the station

This station's main entrance is located at the southwest corner of the intersection with Don Mills Road. A secondary entrance is on the opposite northeast corner, with a new bus terminal stretching beyond that to Gervais Drive. The TTC bus terminal will have seven bus bays as well as on-street bus connections. An underground, accessible passage will link the bus terminal to the light rail transit concourse level, which will have retail spaces. The station will provide 30 outdoor and 30 indoor bicycle parking spaces.

The underground Don Valley station was built using cut-and-cover method. The station is between two surface sections of the line. To travel under Don Mills Road, the line dips underground, passes through the station under the middle of Eglinton Avenue and re-emerges to the surface at the other side. To the west of Don Valley station, there is a facing-point crossover just beyond the ramp descending to the station's west portal. To the east of the station, there is a double crossover on the ramp descending to the station's east portal.

=== Architecture and artwork ===
The Line 5 station was designed by Arcadis, following an architectural concept designed by architects gh3* from Toronto and Daoust Lestage Lizotte Stecker from Montreal. As with other stations on Line 5, architectural features include natural light from large windows and skylights, steel structures painted white, and orange accents (the colour of the line).

As part of a program to install artworks at major interchange stations along Line 5 Eglinton, Don Valley station features an artwork titled Total Lunar Eclipse by British-American artist Sarah Morris. The artwork is a mural consisting of porcelain tiles that were silkscreened by hand. According to the artist, the artwork is a "wall painting" that "invites reflection on concepts of light, scale and motion through space".

The station's main entrance has louvres in the glass panels above the doors. Metrolinx predicted that the louvres "will be a well-known and a distinctive part of the transit destination's look".

== Name ==
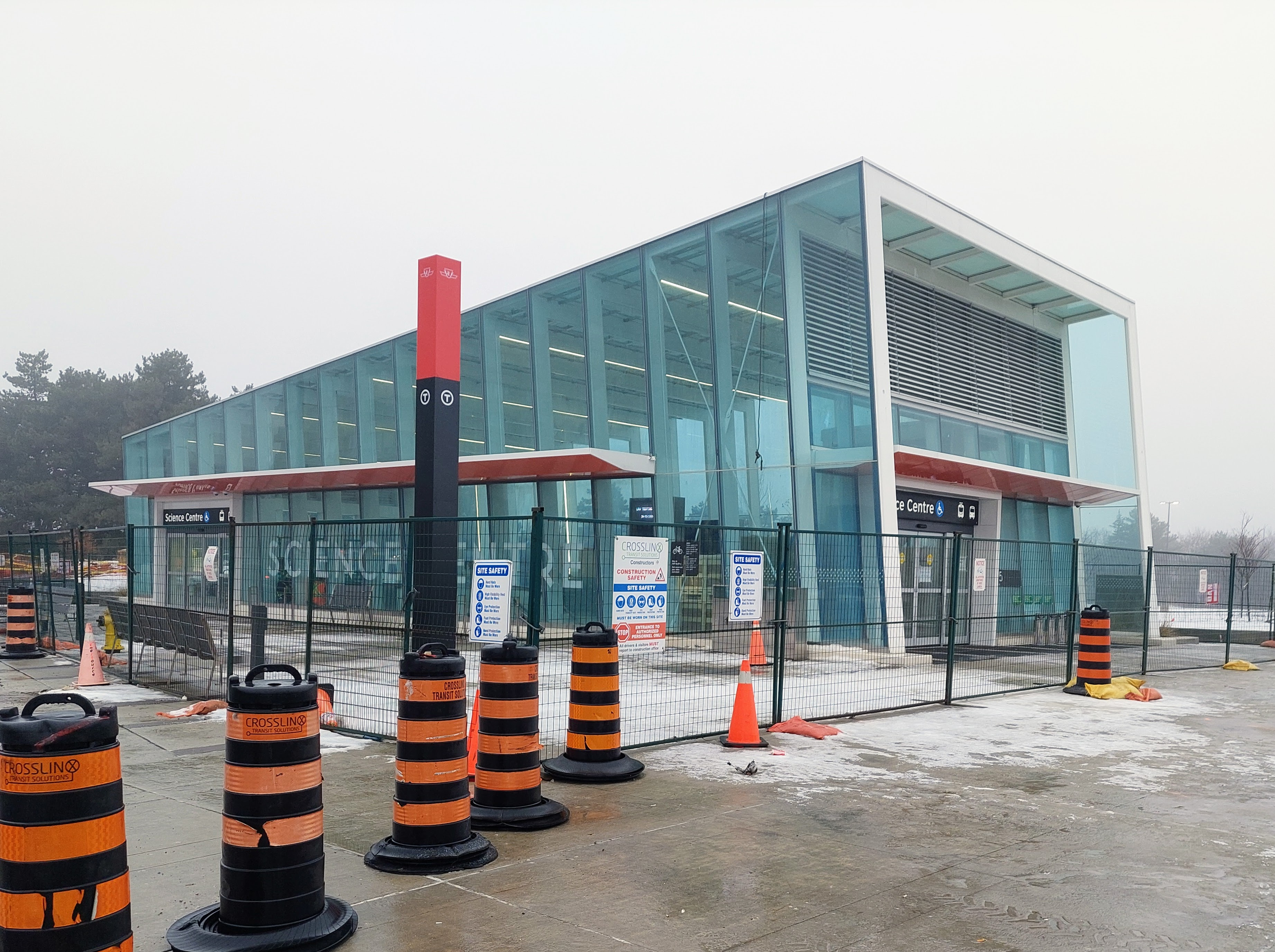
Main entrance of Don Valley station (then called Science Centre) under construction in January 2024

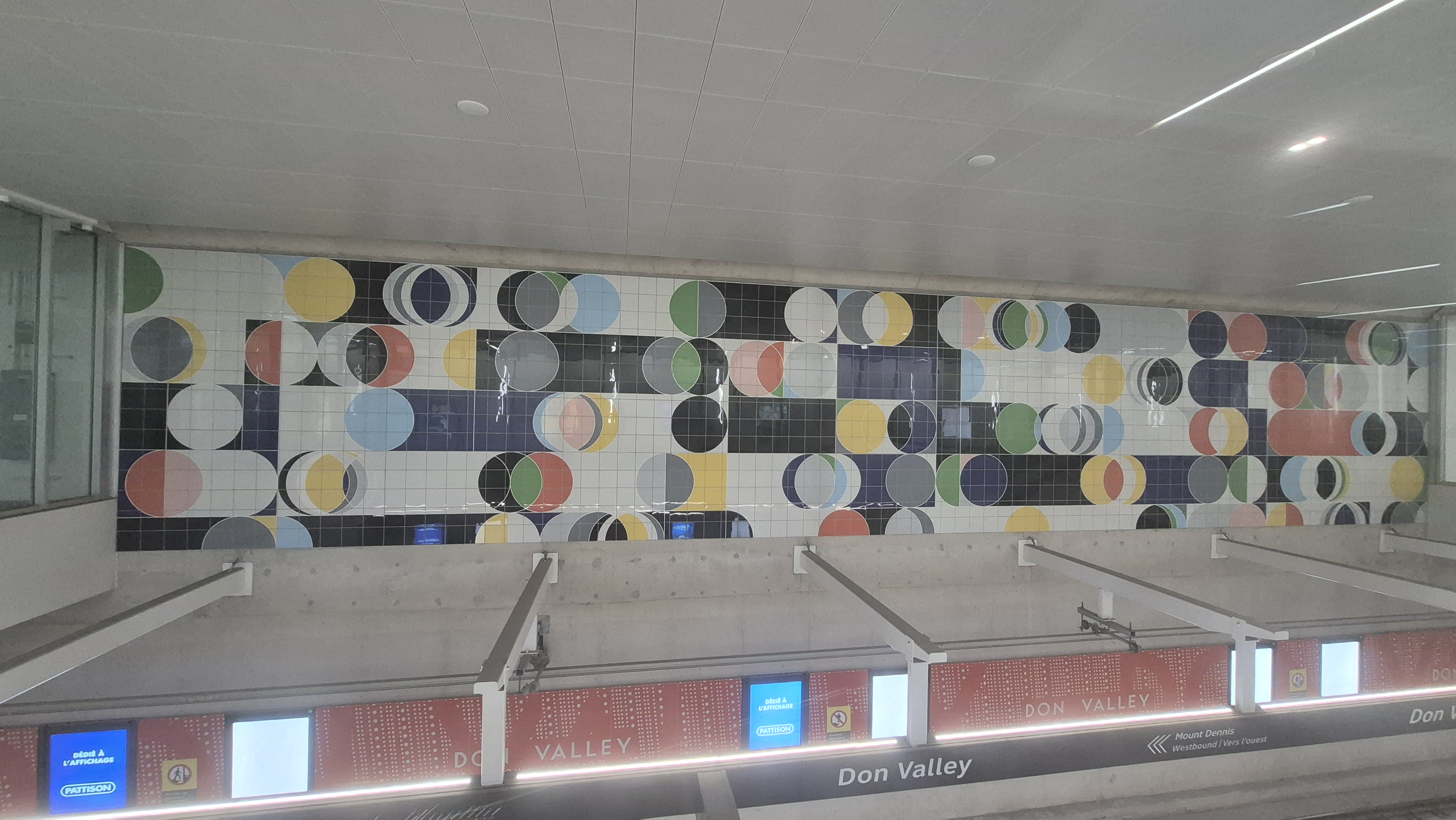
Total Lunar Eclipse by Sarah Morris from the second level

During the planning stages for Line 5 Eglinton, the station was given the working name Don Mills. In 2015, a report to the TTC Board recommended giving a unique name to each station in the subway system (including Line 5 Eglinton). Thus, the station was named Science Centre to reflect its proximity to the Ontario Science Centre (similar to Museum station, which is adjacent to the Royal Ontario Museum) and to avoid confusion with the existing Don Mills station on Line 4 Sheppard.

In June 2024, the government announced that the Ontario Science Centre would close permanently following an engineering report that cited a significant risk of roof collapse. On March 28, 2025, as a result of the closure, Metrolinx announced that the station would be renamed Don Valley to reflect the station's proximity to the Don Valley Parkway, the Don River, and the Don Valley itself. Other names considered for the station were Concorde, Industrial District, Olympia Square, Ferrand, and Don River.

In November 2026, records obtained by CTV News through a freedom of information request showed that the renaming had cost $618,000. The amount paid for about 600 interior and exterior signs, updated system maps and wayfinding, changes to audio announcements and electronic displays, and a large vinyl wrap on the station's exterior. Metrolinx did not disclose the expected cost when it renamed the station. Its first response to the request was almost entirely redacted, and it gave a total cost (current to June 2026) only after Ontario's Information and Privacy Commissioner mediated the dispute. According to Metrolinx, the cost came out of the Line 5 project budget and was combined with other signage changes the project needed, such as those for the closure of Line 3 Scarborough, to keep costs down. Opposition MPPs called it one more cost of the province's plan to move the Science Centre to Ontario Place.

== Nearby landmarks ==
Nearby landmarks include the former Celestica headquarters, the Foresters building, a Real Canadian Superstore, and a Church of Jesus Christ of Latter-day Saints meetinghouse.

Don Valley is one of the Line 5 stations that was reported to have most excited developers. On April 3, 2017, Urban Toronto reported that the City's planning department's initiative for the intersection had been named Don Mills Crossing, while it would be accompanied by a plan for nearby properties, in 2018.

== Surface connections ==
The following bus routes serve Don Valley station:

Bay number	Route	Name	Additional information
1	Spare		
2	100A	Flemingdon Park	Southbound to Broadview station via Grenoble Drive
2	100B	Flemingdon Park	Southbound to Broadview station via Linkwood Lane
3	54A	Lawrence East	Eastbound to Starspray Boulevard
3	54B	Lawrence East	Eastbound to Morningside Avenue
3	954	Lawrence East Express	Eastbound to Starspray Boulevard (Rush hour service)
4	72	Pape	Southbound to Commissioners Street via Pape station
4	Wheel-Trans		
5	162	Lawrence-Donway	Westbound to Lawrence station
5	191	Underhill	Northbound to York Mills Road
6	Spare		
7	Spare		
N/A	25A	Don Mills	Northbound to Steeles Avenue East via Don Mills station and southbound to Broadview station (On-street connection)
N/A	25B	Don Mills	Northbound to Don Mills station and southbound to Broadview station (On-street connection)
N/A	34	Eglinton	Westbound to Mount Dennis station and eastbound to Kennedy station (On-street connection)
N/A	925	Don Mills Express	Northbound to Steeles Avenue East via Don Mills station and southbound to Broadview station (On-street connection)
N/A	325	Don Mills	Blue Night service; northbound to Steeles Avenue East and southbound to Commissioners Street (On-street connection)
N/A	334A	Eglinton	Blue Night service; eastbound to Kennedy station and westbound to Renforth Drive and Pearson Airport (On-street connection)
N/A	334B	Eglinton	Blue Night service; eastbound to Finch Avenue East and Neilson Road via Morningside Avenue and westbound to Mount Dennis station (On-street connection)
N/A	354	Lawrence East	Blue Night service; eastbound to Starspray Boulevard and westbound to Eglinton station (On-street connection)
