= Riverdale station (Toronto) =

Railway station in Toronto, Ontario, Canada

Riverdale
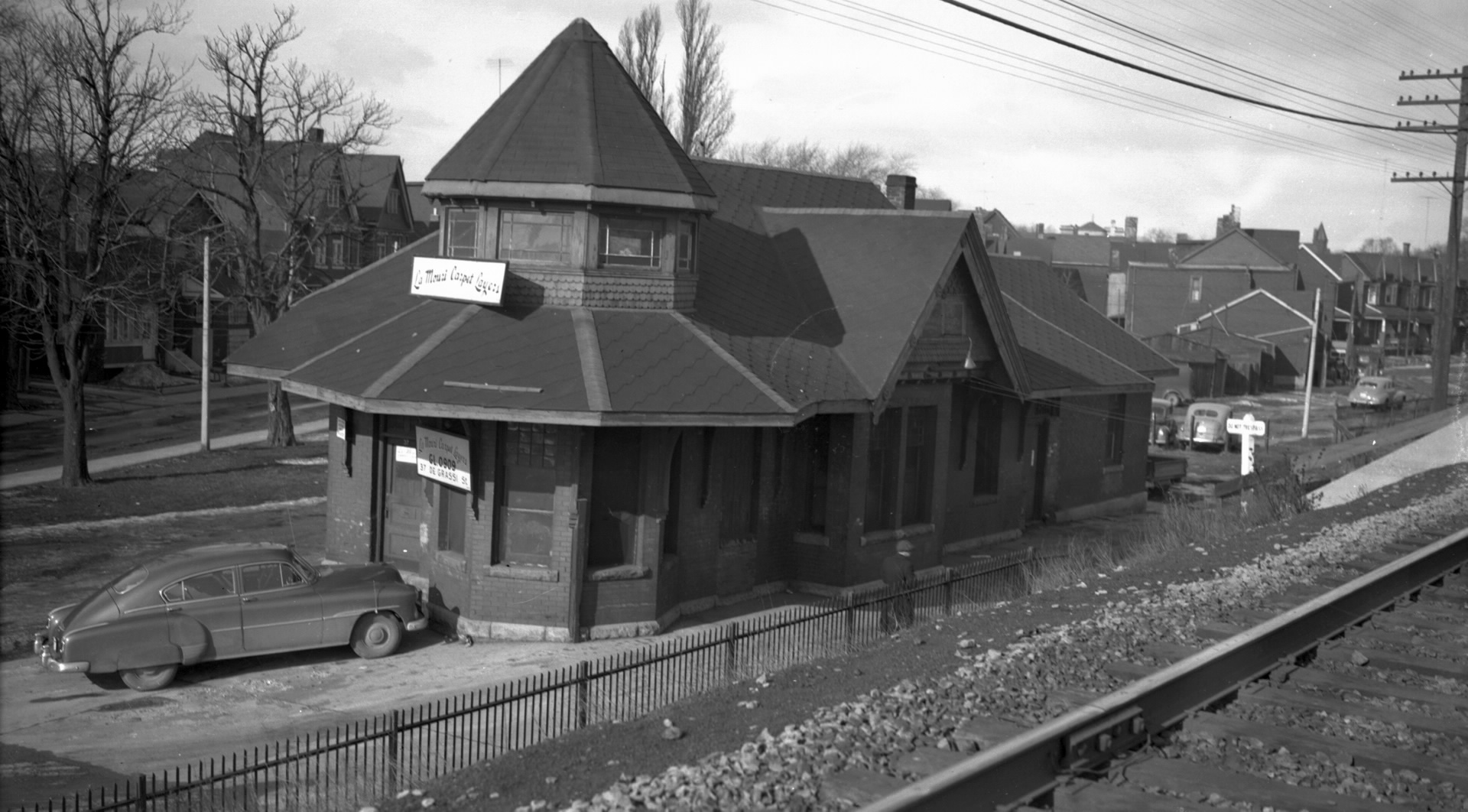

General information
- Location: De Grassi Street, Riverdale, Toronto, Ontario; Canada
- Coordinates: 43°39′39″N 79°20′46″W
- Owner: Grand Trunk Railway; CNR
- Operator: Grand Trunk Railway; CNR
- Line: CN Kingston Subdivision
- Distance: 1.7 miles (2.7 km) to Toronto Union Station

Other information
- Status: Demolished in 1974 and re-purpose as "Bruce Mackey Park" a city parkette

History
- Opened: 1896
- Closed: 1932

Former services
Preceding station	Canadian National Railway	Following station
Toronto toward Sarnia	Grand Trunk Railway; Main Line	Danforth toward Montreal
Location

Riverdale Railway Station was located on De Grassi Street just north of Queen Street East in Toronto, Ontario, Canada. Constructed by the Grand Trunk Railway (GTR) in 1896 as "Queen East Station", on what is now the Lakeshore East line, the station was renamed "Riverdale Station" in 1907. The Canadian National Railway (CNR) took over the station in 1923, when they absorbed the Grand Trunk Railway. CNR discontinued passenger train service at the station in 1932, later for commercial use and demolished the building in 1974.

== History ==
The station was originally built at grade, with a level crossing at Queen Street. This level crossing was considered very dangerous and on November 17, 1904, a collision here between a Toronto Railway Company streetcar and a GTR freight train killed three people and injured seventeen.

Construction began in 1925 on the Toronto Grade Separation project which was completed in 1930. The rebuilding of this eastern approach, beyond the Toronto Terminals Railway limit, eliminated the level crossing. The station had to be moved northwest to accommodate construction of the Queen Street overpass.

The last site of the station building is now part of City of Toronto's Bruce Mackey Park, (formerly Wardell Parkette) which runs along the westerly side of the railway tracks, between Queen and Dundas Streets.

Plans to build a GO Station at this location were discussed as part of Metrolinx's 2014 Yonge Relief Network Study. The proposed SmartTrack plan, raised during the 2014 Toronto Mayoral Election, would also have built a station here, where GO Transit's Stouffville commuter service crosses Queen Street. A subway station on the under-construction Ontario Line is located just southwest of the final (1920s) Riverdale station location.
