= Ontario Line =

Future rapid transit line in Toronto, Canada

- Construction at Exhibition station in September 2026

Overview
- Status: Under construction
- Owner: Metrolinx
- Locale: Toronto, Ontario
- Termini: Don Valley; Exhibition
- Stations: 15

Service
- Type: Rapid transit
- System: Toronto subway
- Operator: Transdev Canada (within Connect 6ix consortium)
- Rolling stock: Hitachi Rail

History
- Planned opening: Early 2030s

Technical
- Line length: 15.6 km (9.7 mi)
- Track gauge: 1,435 mm (4 ft 8 1/2 in) standard gauge
- Electrification: Overhead line, 1,500 V DC
- Operating speed: 80 km/h (50 mph)
Route map

The Ontario Line is a rapid transit line under construction in Toronto, Ontario, Canada. Fifteen new stations will be built along its 15.6-kilometre (9.7 mi) length, six of them connecting to other transit lines. Its northern terminus will be at Eglinton Avenue and Don Mills Road, at Don Valley station, where it will connect with Line 5 Eglinton. Its southern terminus will be at the existing Exhibition GO Station on the Lakeshore West line.

The Ontario Line was announced by the Government of Ontario on April 10, 2019. Initially estimated to cost CA$10.9 billion with completion by 2027, the line was estimated in 2026 to cost around $34 billion with an estimated opening date in the early 2030s. A groundbreaking ceremony for the project took place on March 27, 2022. On April 20, 2026, tunnelling began using two tunnel boring machines.

Upon opening, the plan is for the line to be designated Line 3. This identifier was used by Line 3 Scarborough until its closure in July 2023.

== Project history ==
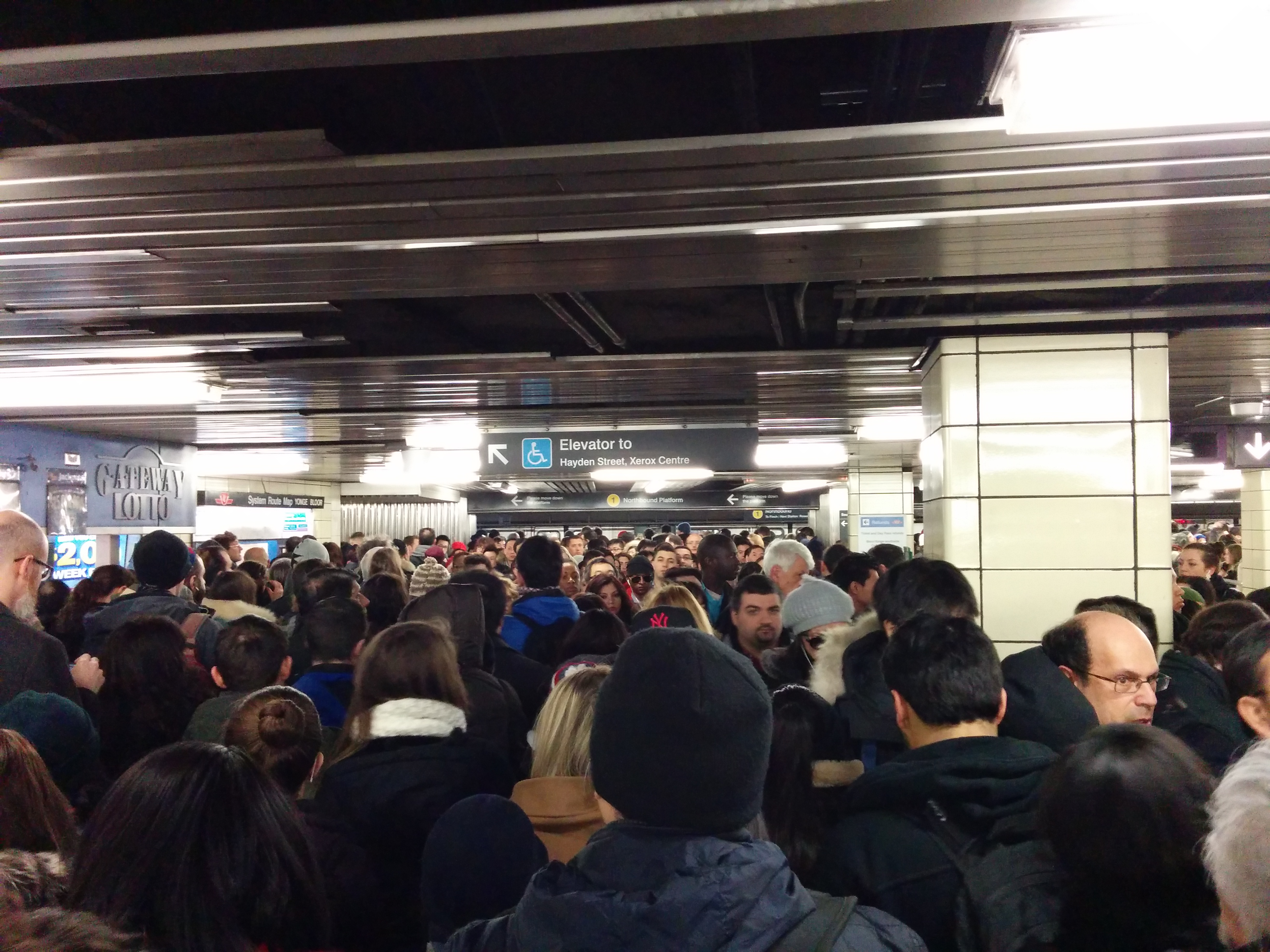
Line 1 Yonge–University platform level of Bloor–Yonge station during a service disruption

=== Downtown Relief Line ===
Plans for an east–west downtown subway line date back to the early 20th century, most of which ran along Queen Street. In the 1980s, plans first emerged for a "Downtown Relief Line" that would provide capacity relief to the Yonge segment of Line 1 and the Bloor–Yonge interchange station, and extend subway service coverage in the city's east end. Additionally, the Toronto Transit Commission (TTC) initiated measures to increase capacity on Line 1 – including longer, walk-through trains, as well as the transition to automatic train control – to increase the frequency of service.

In 2012, the TTC completed the Downtown Rapid Transit Expansion Study, which determined that a relief line will be required by the 2030s, given the overcrowding and high demand along the Yonge corridor. The recommended U-shaped concept, with termini northeast and northwest crossing south through downtown, and proposed construction phasing plan, formed the basis for the Ontario Line.

Since the early 21st century, studies proposed a line that would run south from Line 2 Bloor–Danforth at a point east of the Don River before bending westward along Queen Street into Downtown Toronto. The Relief Line was included in the regional transportation plan The Big Move and was noted as one of Metrolinx's top 15 transit priorities.

In the mid-2010s, the City of Toronto developed plans for this line, known as the "Relief Line South", (Note: The "relief" would be to overcrowding at Bloor–Yonge station and the Yonge Street section of Line 1.) between Pape station on Line 2 Bloor–Danforth and Osgoode station on Line 1 Yonge–University. In August 2018, an alignment was approved by the Ministry of the Environment, Conservation and Parks. It was estimated that the Relief Line South would cost around CA$6.8 billion and open in the late 2020s. In early 2019, the Ontario government announced its intention to take over subway construction in Toronto from the TTC through Metrolinx.

=== Ontario Line ===
In a surprise announcement in April 2019, the Ontario government under Premier Doug Ford presented the Ontario Line proposal, which at that time appeared to incorporate much of the routing and many of the station locations of the Relief Line. Unlike the city's design, the Ontario Line would be a "standalone" line, one that would use lighter rolling stock and shorter trainsets than the Toronto Transit Commission's existing subway lines. Members of Toronto City Council expressed their concerns that the new line would set back the delivery of rapid transit and potentially waste money the city had already spent on the Relief Line's design.

Metrolinx prepared the plan for the Ontario Line in just three months based on a proposal by transit consultant Michael Schabas. Metrolinx hired Schabas in December 2018 to lead a team to transform the Relief Line plans into the Ontario Line. Schabas supported using lighter metro vehicles such as those used in London's Docklands Light Railway, as such vehicles were deemed more suitable for steeper grades and elevated structures. A draft plan was ready by January 31, 2019. Doug Ford approved the plan after a February 26 presentation. Metrolinx did not disclose details of the project until the provincial government chose to announce it on April 10.

As initially announced in April 2019, the route of the Ontario Line seemed to follow much of the route of the Relief Line, beginning either at Exhibition Place or Ontario Place, travelling northeast to King and Bathurst Streets, then northeast to Spadina Avenue and Queen Street. It then proceeded eastward through downtown along Queen Street before turning southeast in the area of Parliament Street south to Eastern Avenue. The line had one station on King Street and Sumach Street, then made an east–west crossing of the Lower Don River to a station at Broadview and Eastern Avenues. The line proceeded northeast to Pape Avenue and Danforth Avenue and continued north along Pape Avenue, making a north–south crossing of the Don River to the Thorncliffe Park neighbourhood. The line continued northeast along Don Mills Road to terminate at Don Mills Road and Eglinton Avenue.

The initial announcement was ambiguous whether the line would terminate at Ontario Place or Exhibition Place. The Ontario Place alignment stirred controversy, as Ford had spoken of transforming Ontario Place, previously a family-oriented venue, into an adult-oriented casino complex. Some suspected that the plan to extend the line to Ontario Place was aimed at out-of-province gamblers, not Ontarians. Ford denied that the extension was related to any casino plans. The Globe and Mail reported that no previous plan had ever considered making Ontario Place a rapid transit destination and that the announcement surprised everyone, including mayor of Toronto John Tory. The Ontario government ultimately chose the Exhibition Place alignment.

In July 2019, the Toronto Star obtained and reported on confidential documents from Metrolinx. The documents showed that the proposed route would be markedly different from that of the Relief Line South and involve significant lengths of at-grade or elevated track. The Ontario Place station was eliminated, with an Exhibition station added near the Exhibition GO Station. The section between Queen/Sherbourne and Gerrard stations would come to the surface and mostly follow a railway right-of-way instead of being tunnelled. The new route would substitute a Corktown station about 500 metres (1,600 ft) west of the proposed location for Sumach station on the Relief Line. The Ontario Line would share less than half the planned route of the Relief Line between Osgoode and Pape stations.

In October 2019, Tory and Ford reached a tentative deal in which the city would endorse the line and the TTC's subway network would not be taken over by the provincial government. The deal was later approved by Toronto City Council in a 22-to-3 decision.

=== Procurement ===
The Ontario Line project is being delivered through various public–private partnerships (P3), progressive design–build and traditional procurement contracts, which are all being staged accordingly for their successful delivery. The contracts are:

==== Rolling stock, systems, operations and maintenance (RSSOM) ====
On June 2, 2020, Infrastructure Ontario (IO) and Metrolinx issued a request for qualification (RFQ) for rolling stock, systems, operations and maintenance (RSSOM), part of the first phase of procurement for the Ontario Line. On November 17, 2022, the contract was awarded to Connect 6ix (a consortium led by Hitachi Rail, Transdev Canada, Plenary Americas, and Webuild) with a projected in-service date of 2031. The contract was valued at $9 billion, with $2.3 billion of construction costs and $6.7 billion of financing relating to rolling stock and 30 years of operation and maintenance of the line.

The contract covered the design, construction, operation and ongoing maintenance for the entire Ontario Line, for a 30-year term, including:

- Rolling stock, to be designed, supplied, and maintained by consortium member Hitachi Rail and operated by Transdev Canada
- An operations, maintenance and storage facility (OMSF) for the rolling stock
- An operations control centre (OCC) and backup operations control centre (BOCC), where staff control train operations in coordination with GO Transit and Toronto Transit Commission
- Train operations, including an automated unattended train operation system
- Systems, including track, communications (e.g. network, Wi-Fi, CCTV, passenger display systems), and traffic control systems
- Fare equipment coordination with Presto

==== Southern civil, stations and tunnel ====
On June 2, 2020, Infrastructure Ontario (IO) and Metrolinx issued an RFQ for the southern portion, part of the first phase of procurement for the Ontario Line. On November 9, 2022, the contract was awarded to Ontario Transit Group (a consortium led by Ferrovial and Vinci), with a projected completion date of 2030. The contract was valued at $6 billion.

The contract included the design and construction of:

- A 6-kilometre (3.7 mi) tunnel through downtown Toronto from Exhibition GO to Don Yard portal (west of Don River)
- Seven stations, including four new standalone underground stations (King West, Chinatown, Moss Park, Distillery District), two underground interchange stations (Queen–Yonge and Osgoode) and one above-ground station (Exhibition)
- Advance civil engineering work (including ground works to build the tunnel and stations, utility and conduit works prior to mechanical and electrical work under RSSOM, guideway structures and facilities prior to trackworks under RSSOM)

==== Pape tunnel and underground stations ====
On November 17, 2022, Metrolinx and Infrastructure Ontario issued an RFQ for the northern portion between Gerrard station and the Don Valley Bridge. On January 17, 2024, the contract was awarded to Pape North Connect (a consortium led by Webuild and FCC Group (formerly Fomento de Construcciones y Contratas)). In August 2026, it was announced that the contract had been signed, with a value of $4.3 billion.

The contract included the design and construction of:

- 3 kilometres (1.9 mi) of tunnel underneath Pape Avenue from the future Gerrard portal to the Don Valley bridge
- Two underground stations – one standalone (Cosburn) and one interchange (Pape)
- Advance civil engineering work (including underpinning of the existing Line 2 Pape station, three emergency exit buildings, crossover near Sammon Avenue) prior to mechanical and electrical systems installation under RSSOM

==== Elevated guideway and stations ====
On November 17, 2022, Metrolinx and Infrastructure Ontario issued an RFQ for the northern portion between the Don Valley Bridge and Don Valley station. On February 20, 2024, the contract was awarded to Trillium Guideway Partners (a consortium led by Acciona and AMICO). As of August 2026, a contract value had not yet been announced.

The contract included the design and construction of:

- 3 kilometres (1.9 mi) of elevated guideway
- Five elevated stations (Leslieville, Gerrard, Thorncliffe Park, Flemingdon Park, Don Valley), including connections to Line 5 Eglinton at Don Valley
- Advance civil engineering work (including one emergency exit building, sections of Metrolinx-owned rail corridor where the Ontario Line trains will operate emergency exits, and interface with the OMSF and Line 5 Eglinton) before mechanical and electrical systems installation by the RSSOM contract

==== Joint use corridor ====
In addition to the above contracts, there will also be a series of early-works projects for bridge, track and other preparatory activities to help advance the delivery of the Ontario Line primarily at two locations: Exhibition GO Station to Strachan portal and Don Yard portal to the future Gerrard Station. These contracts were procured traditionally by Metrolinx and Infrastructure Ontario.

=== Revision of estimates ===
==== Cost ====
When the Ontario line was announced in April 2019, initial cost estimates were around $10.9 billion. This did not include the cost of financing the line, or long-term operation and maintenance costs. By November 2022, the estimated cost of the line had nearly doubled to $17 to 19 billion, including not only design and construction but also financing costs, operation, and maintenance. The provincial government claimed that the higher estimate was due to inflation and supply issues.

In late June 2024, a Metrolinx rapid transit project report showed the cost of the Ontario Line project had risen to $27.2 billion to build and operate, a 43 percent increase from the 2022 estimate. The project had spent $5 billion in construction costs, with almost $600 million spent between January and April 2024. By June 2026, the cost had risen to $29.8 billion.

In August 2026, after the awarding of further contracts for tunnelling and station construction, Metrolinx announced the revised estimated cost at $34 billion. Metrolinx CEO Michael Lindsay attributed the cost increases to "supply chain shocks and trade uncertainty".

==== Opening date ====
When the Ontario line was announced in April 2019, the estimated completion date was 2027. By December 2020, the completion date had been revised to 2030. Metrolinx said that the original completion date was based on market conditions that since 2019 had changed dramatically. By November 2022, the completion date was being reported as 2031. As of August 2026, Metrolinx estimates that the line will open "sometime in the early 2030s".

=== Construction ===
A ground-breaking ceremony attended by Ford, Tory, and other politicians and officials was held on March 27, 2022, at Exhibition Place, despite no major contracts having been awarded at that point. By the end of August 2022, buildings at the site of the future Corktown station had been demolished to allow for construction to start in 2023. In the meantime, archeologists were allowed on site to document any historical findings. Following the awarding of major contracts that November, major design and construction work of the rolling stock, systems, operations and maintenance (RSSOM) and southern civil, stations and tunnel contracts were anticipated to commence in 2023. By early 2023, preparation work was already in progress at the sites for Exhibition, Queen, Corktown, Osgoode and Moss Park stations, at the Don Yard, in the Lakeshore East rail corridor east of the Don River, and at the future tunnel portal near Pape Avenue and Gerrard Street.

On May 1, 2023, an estimated 4.5-year closure of Queen Street between Victoria and Bay Streets began to allow construction at Queen station. In December 2023, Metrolinx noted that construction would "ramp up" in 2024 across the line, including the beginning of tunnelling work, although tunnelling did not actually start until two years later. This required Route 501 Queen streetcars to be diverted via new trackage laid on Adelaide and Richmond Streets. The temporary diversion took effect on November 10, 2024.

On April 20, 2026, tunnelling began along the line's downtown section using two tunnel boring machines dubbed Libby and Corkie, which worked side-by-side starting at the excavated Exhibition station site. They were named after the Liberty Village and Corktown neighbourhoods, which mark the start and endpoints of the boring work.

== Concerns ==
After a draft of the Ontario Line's business case was disclosed in July 2019, a number of concerns were raised by transit experts:

- Doubts were expressed that the line could be completed within budget and by 2027. Metrolinx plans to start the procurement process in 2020 to allow bidding companies to comment on the feasibility of the 2027 completion date. The estimated completion had been revised to 2030 by December 2020.
- It may be challenging to fit the Ontario Line along GO Transit's Lakeshore East corridor. The Ontario Line would need to be added to three existing overpasses. If the Ontario Line requires widening of the Lakeshore East embankment, property acquisitions may be required including nearby houses, businesses and community facilities. In September 2020, Metrolinx said the platform area of the former Grand Trunk Railway's Riverdale railway station gave the rail corridor extra width at Queen Street; thus, the Ontario Line would not affect the adjacent Jimmie Simpson Community Centre.
- Flood mitigation projects and reconstruction of the Gardiner Expressway at Lower Don River may impede Ontario Line construction.
- There are doubts that passengers can alight and board smaller Ontario Line trains quickly enough to achieve the projected 90-second train frequency. Metrolinx insists the frequency can be met by reducing station dwell times.
- Concerns were raised that winter conditions may adversely affect train operations on an elevated track, as they did with the former Line 3 Scarborough, which also had elevated trackage.
- The elevated structures may have a greater environmental impact with respect to noise, vibration and visual presence than with an underground right-of-way. Metrolinx proposes using mitigation strategies involving "systems, maintenance and track design" to reduce noise and vibration, and new community spaces and parks "to offset (the) visual impact and footprint of the elevated structure". Another design decision Metrolinx must make is whether the elevated structure along Don Mills Road would be above or beside the road. In September 2020, Metrolinx said it would build noise walls along the rail corridor between Gerrard and East Harbour stations.
- Some of the savings for surface construction may be partially offset by the cost of building surface-to-tunnel transitions at Cherry Street and at Gerrard Street.
- Operating costs for the above-ground sections may be higher due to exposure to the elements.
- Operating the Ontario Line along an elevated Lakeshore East embankment might require slower speeds to navigate grades and curves.

Residents along the Riverdale portion of the route have reported damage to their homes, including cracked foundations, damaged floors and rat infestations. Metrolinx expropriated several homes and in August 2024 announced further expropriations, although residents might be able to return to their original homes.

== Description ==
=== Route ===
Schematic map of the Ontario Line indicating stations and connections. Thin lines indicate on-street sections of Line 5 Eglinton.

The following route description is based on a revised plan issued by Metrolinx in September and October 2020, plus a revision published in April 2021.

The northeastern terminus of the Ontario Line would be Don Valley station at Don Mills Road and Eglinton Avenue. This station would be a transfer point for Line 5 Eglinton and TTC buses. The Ontario Line platform would be on an elevated structure above Don Valley station's bus terminal, located north of Eglinton Avenue on the east side of Don Mills Road.

Continuing south on an elevated structure, the line would cross Eglinton Avenue and then cross to the west side of Don Mills Road, passing through Flemingdon Park station located on a northwest corner opposite Gateway Boulevard. Immediately south of this station, the line would turn west along the Hydro One right-of-way, and cross the Don Valley on a new bridge. Continuing west on the other side of the valley, the line would pass the Ontario Line maintenance and storage facility. The line would jog south to Overlea Boulevard and then jog west on the north side of that street on an elevated structure. The line would pass through Thorncliffe Park station, which would be over the western portion of Thorncliffe Park Boulevard. Continuing west on an elevated structure, the line would curve south over Millwood Road across the Don Valley on a new bridge roughly parallel and west of Leaside Bridge. On the south side of the valley crossing, the line would enter a tunnel under Minton Place.

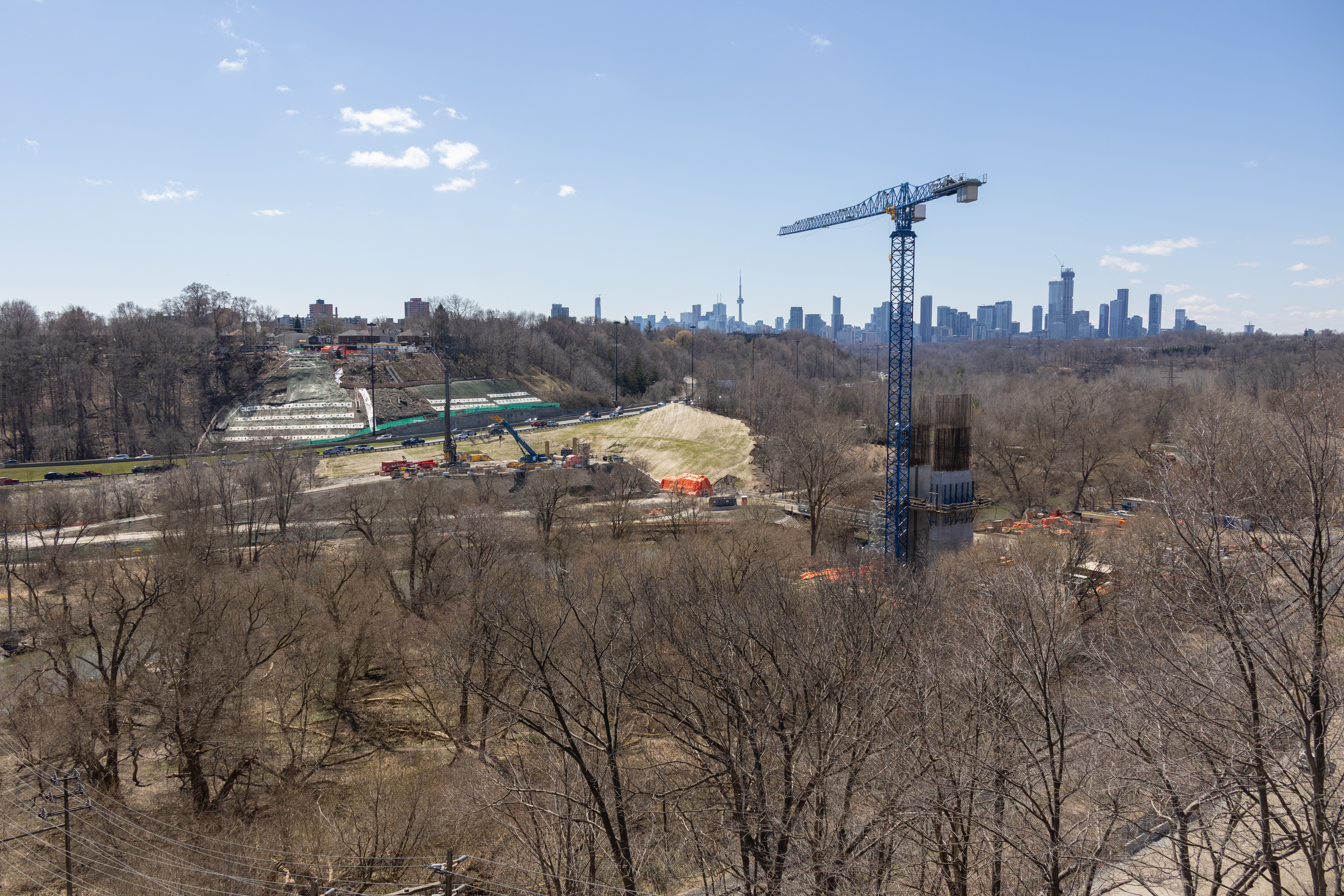
Construction of a new bridge over the Don Valley in April 2026

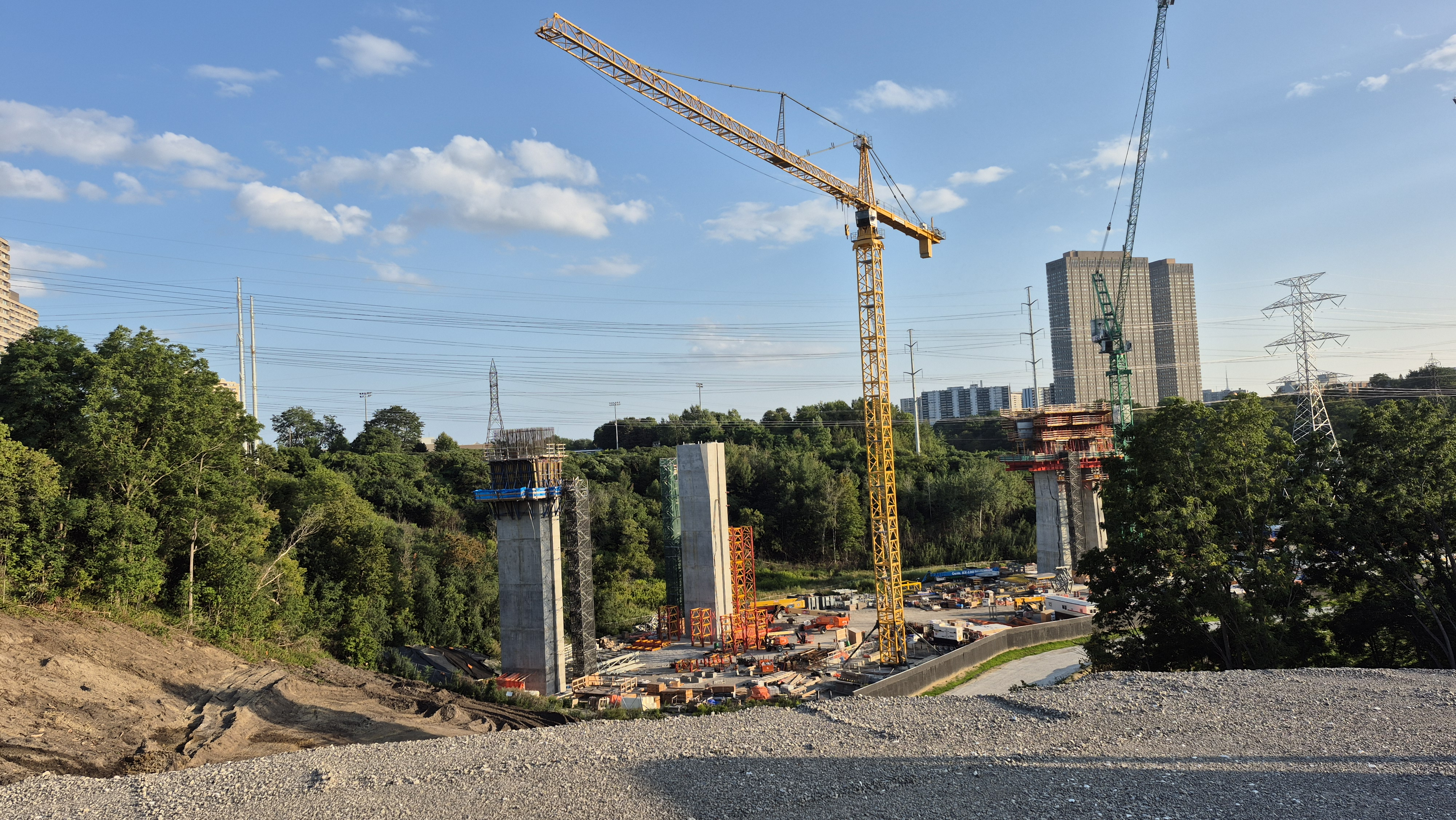
Construction of the second bridge over the Don Valley near the former Ontario Science Centre in August 2026

From Minton Place, the line would continue south under Pape Avenue, passing through Cosburn and Pape stations. The tunnel, mainly under Pape Avenue, would bow slightly to the west at Cosburn station, and slightly to the east at Pape station to avoid digging up the street to construct the station structures. At Pape station, the Ontario Line would connect with Line 2 Bloor–Danforth.

South from Pape station, the line would travel roughly under Pape Avenue, emerging to the surface just north of Gerrard Street. The line would then enter Gerrard station on an elevated structure over the intersection of Gerrard Street and Carlaw Avenue. South of Gerrard station, the Ontario Line would run along the northwest side of GO Transit's Lakeshore East rail corridor located on an embankment. (The rail corridor has three tracks with provision for a fourth. With the construction of the Ontario Line, the corridor would eventually have six tracks.) The route would continue along the railway right-of-way, passing Leslieville station at Queen Street East and continuing to East Harbour station, east of the Don River, on the south side of Eastern Avenue, where a new GO train station would be built on the surface. The Ontario Line would cross the Don River again on another new bridge located on the north side of the existing rail bridge. After crossing the river, the line would pass the GO Transit Don Yard before descending into a tunnel just east of Cherry Street.

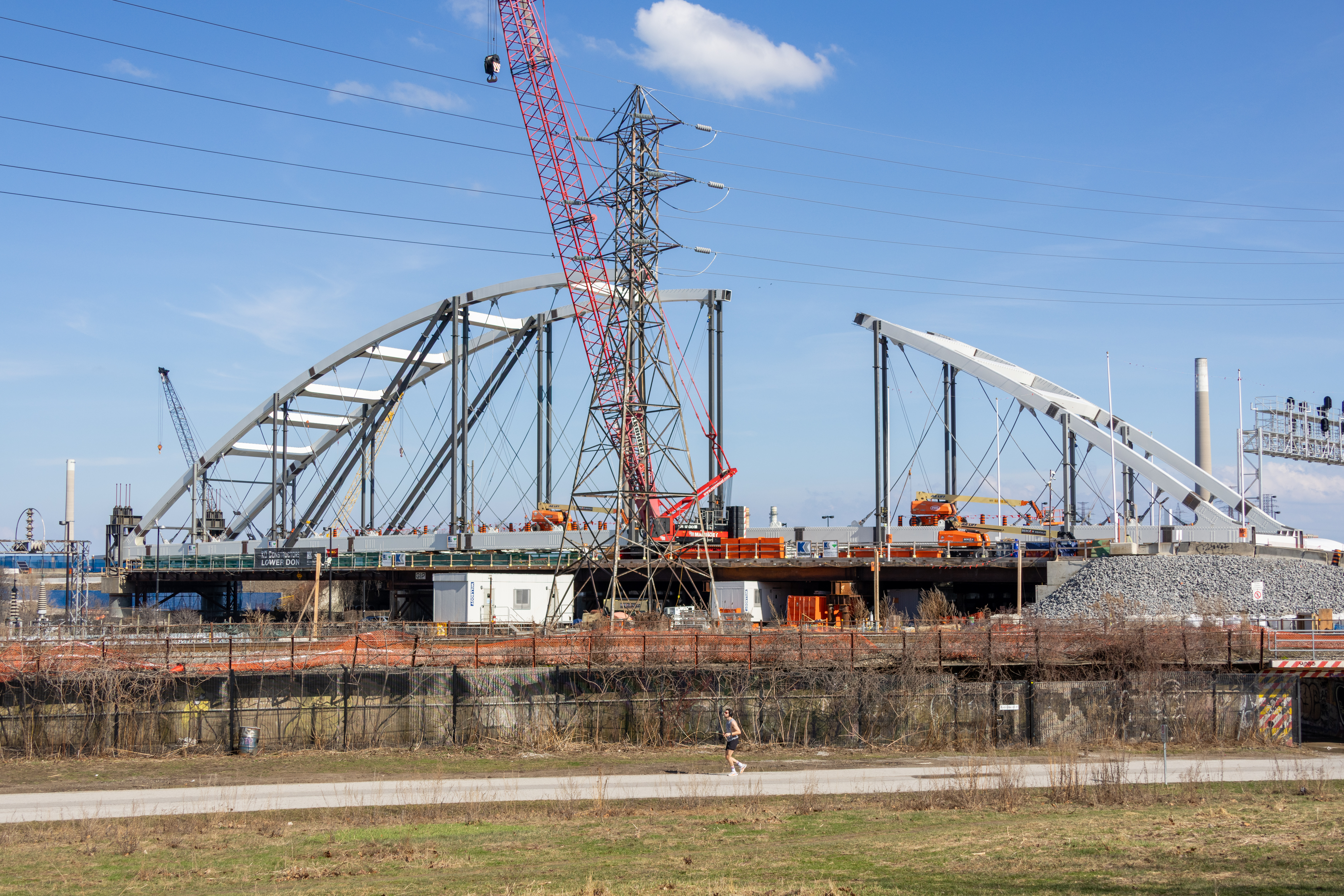
Construction of the Lower Don Bridge in April 2026

The route would turn north under the east side of Berkeley Street through Distillery District station at King Street. Between King and Queen Streets, the line would make a broad north-to-west curve to run west under Queen Street through Moss Park station (between Shuter and Sherbourne Streets), Queen station (at Yonge Street) and Osgoode station (at University Avenue). The line would continue westward to Chinatown station, then diagonally southwest via King West station to Strachan Avenue. The line would turn westward again, coming to the surface just west of Strachan Avenue on the north side of the railway corridor along Exhibition Place, before arriving at Exhibition station, its southwestern terminus.

=== Maintenance and storage facility ===
Metrolinx media
- Plan of proposed OLMSF

The Ontario Line maintenance and storage facility (OLMSF) will occupy a 17.5-hectare (43-acre) site north of Overlea Boulevard, between Beth Nealson Drive and the CPKC Rail North Toronto Corridor. It will be located near the future Thorncliffe Park station. The facility would store 200 trains and have a maximum capacity of 250.

Construction of the MSF would require the demolition of an Islamic centre and a shopping plaza that includes local businesses such as the popular Iqbal Halal Foods grocery store, serving the primarily Muslim population of Thorncliffe Park. In December 2021, Metrolinx made a $49.5 million agreement with the Islamic Society of Toronto to move to a larger facility at 20 Overlea Boulevard. Metrolinx also committed to help relocate businesses within Thorncliffe Park. However, Save TPARK, a neighbourhood group, opposed the proposed location of the MSF, calling it an unwelcome encroachment on the community. The group urged Metrolinx to choose another location and offer the community more affordable housing.

=== Miscellaneous ===
In 2019, Metrolinx was considering a means to link Exhibition station to Ontario Place to the south. Options to provide the link included a people mover or cable cars.

The Government of Ontario plans to use standard-gauge train sets for the Ontario Line that are smaller than those used on the Toronto subway system. The City of Toronto's Relief Line proposal was expected to use existing heavy-rail rolling stock that is also used on Lines 1, 2, and 4. By using driverless trains with automatic train control (ATC), Metrolinx expects the line to match the capacity of the existing heavy rail lines despite using smaller, lighter trains by increasing the frequency. In conjunction with ATC, stations will have platform-edge doors for safety, which would also allow riders to exit and enter trains more quickly. The government also claims the alternate technology will reduce construction time and cost, as single tunnels rather than dual tunnels could be used.

Most of the proposed stations on the Ontario Line will facilitate transfers between other forms of public transport, and the majority will provide transfers to other rail-based transportation (GO Transit, TTC subway and streetcar).

According to Metrolinx, the new line will do more than provide relief to overcrowding on Toronto's existing subway system: it will provide new connections to the communities of Flemingdon Park and Thorncliffe Park.

The Ontario Line is expected to re-use Line 3 Scarborough's number on maps and wayfinding. The Scarborough line closed permanently in July 2023, several years before the planned opening of the Ontario Line.

== Stations ==
The line will have 15 stations, with four connecting to other Toronto subway lines and two stations connecting to GO Transit rail services. Other stations have connections to Toronto Transit Commission streetcar and bus services. Station names and other details are subject to change. On April 16, 2026, it was announced that the names of four stations in downtown Toronto had been finalized, with King–Bathurst becoming King West, Queen–Spadina becoming Chinatown, Corktown becoming Distillery District and Riverside–Leslieville becoming Leslieville.

Ontario Line stations (as of April 2026)
Station	Type	Neighbourhood	Connections	Notes
Don Valley	Elevated	Flemingdon Park	Eglinton	Integrated with existing station at Don Mills Road and Eglinton Avenue; formerly known as Science Centre station as it is adjacent to the original site of the Ontario Science Centre
Flemingdon Park	Elevated	Flemingdon Park		West side of Don Mills Road north of Gateway Boulevard
Thorncliffe Park	Elevated	Thorncliffe Park		On Overlea Boulevard over Thorncliffe Park Drive West
Cosburn	Underground	Old East York		At Cosburn Avenue and Pape Avenue
Pape	Underground	Greektown	Bloor–Danforth	Integrated with an existing station at Pape Avenue and Danforth Avenue
Gerrard	Elevated (railway embankment)	Riverdale	506 Carlton	Located at the intersection of Gerrard Street and Carlaw Avenue, along the Lakeshore East and Stouffville GO Transit rail corridors
Leslieville	Elevated (railway embankment)	Leslieville; South Riverdale	501 Queen; 503 Kingston Rd	Located at the intersection of Queen Street East and GO Transit's Lakeshore East / Stouffville rail corridor
East Harbour	Elevated (railway embankment)	Leslieville; South Riverdale	Lakeshore East; Stouffville (expected)	Located along GO Transit's Lakeshore East / Stouffville rail corridor between Eastern Avenue and the Don River
Distillery District	Underground	Corktown; Old Town; Distillery District	504 King	At Berkeley Street and King Street East
Moss Park	Underground	Regent Park; Moss Park	501 Queen	Under Queen Street East between George Street and Sherbourne Street
Queen	Underground	Downtown	Yonge–University; 501 Queen	Integrated with an existing station at Queen Street and Yonge Street
Osgoode	Underground	Downtown	Yonge–University; 501 Queen	Integrated with an existing station at Queen Street West and University Avenue
Chinatown	Underground	Fashion District; Chinatown	501 Queen; 510 Spadina	At the intersection of Queen Street West and Spadina Avenue
King West	Underground	Fashion District	504 King; 511 Bathurst	At the intersection of King Street West and Bathurst Street
Exhibition	Surface	Liberty Village	509 Harbourfront; 511 Bathurst; Lakeshore West	On the north side of the Lakeshore West railway corridor north of Exhibition Place

=== Don Valley ===
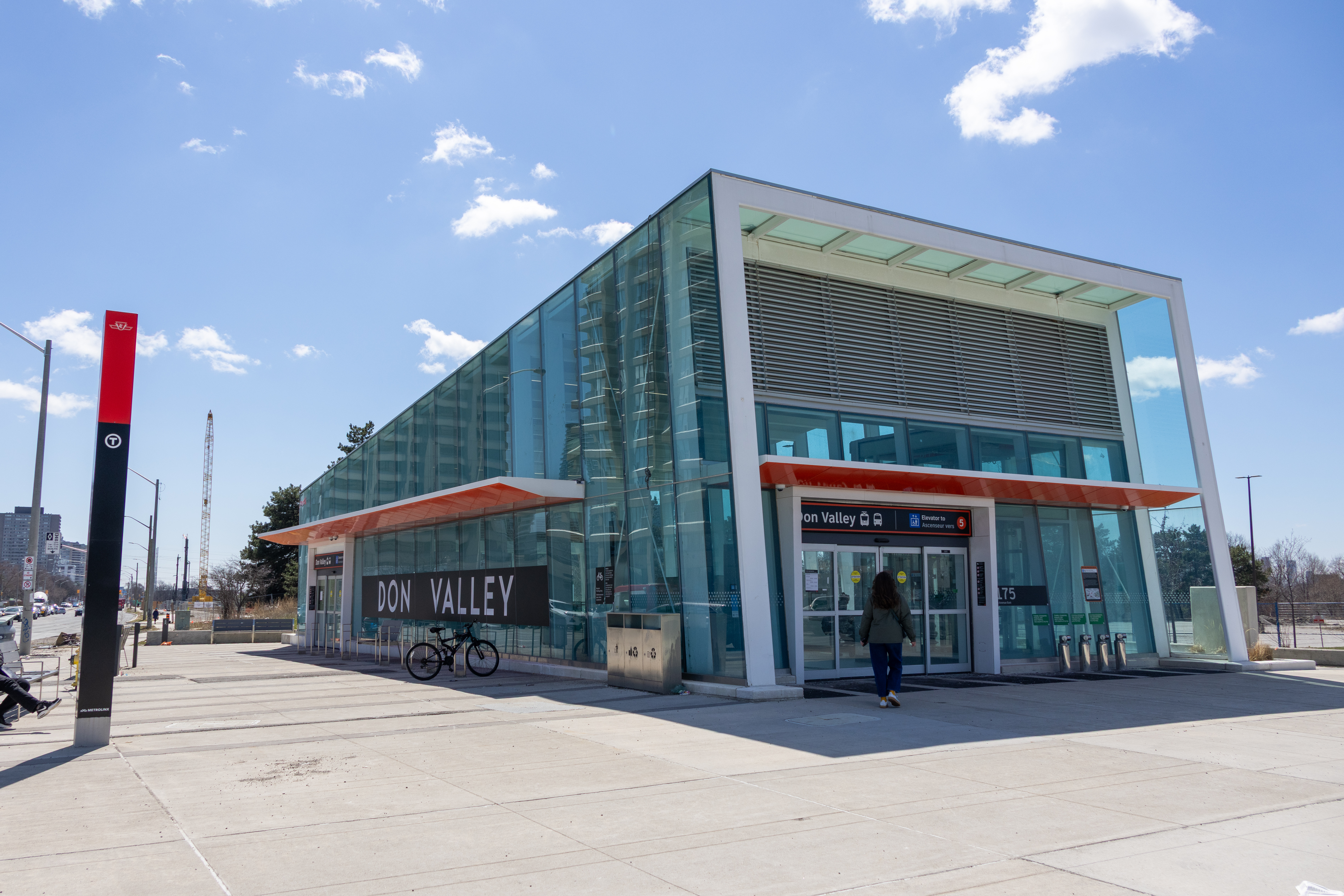
Don Valley station will serve as the northern terminus of the Ontario Line and connect with Line 5 Eglinton

The Ontario Line will serve Don Valley station at Eglinton Avenue, providing a connection to Line 5 Eglinton. The elevated Ontario Line station will be along Don Mills Road at the northeast corner of its intersection with Eglinton Avenue. Passengers will be able to access rail services from either the station's southwest or northeast entrance as well as from the adjacent bus terminal. The station will have three levels, with the Line 5 platforms below street level, the bus terminal at street level and the Ontario Line platforms above street level. Escalators, elevators and interior corridors will be available to facilitate transfers. It will also have side platforms, an unusual configuration for rapid transit terminal stations in Toronto, which typically featured centre platforms. Originally named Science Centre, the station was renamed Don Valley in March 2025 given the permanent closure of the Ontario Science Centre's Don Mills site in June 2024.

There will be tail tracks at the north end of the Ontario Line platforms extending north past Wynford Drive. These will be used to store trains and to provide for future northward expansion.

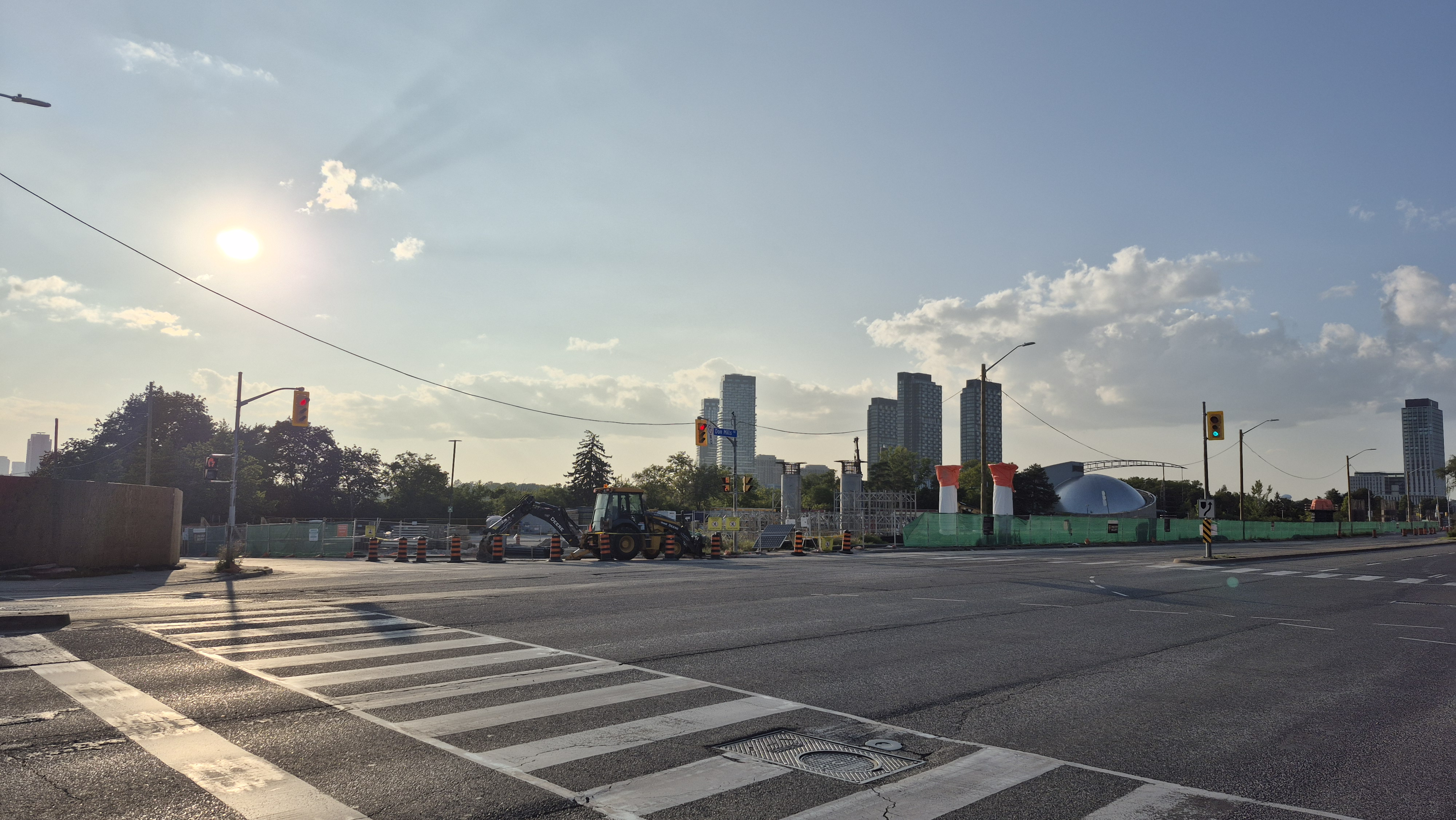
Flemingdon Park station construction in August 2026 on the grounds of the former Ontario Science Centre

=== Flemingdon Park ===
Flemingdon Park station will be located on the west side of Don Mills Road at the north side of its intersection with Gateway Boulevard. It will be constructed at the site of a parking lot. As of June 2021, Metrolinx had not indicated the location of entrances and exits for this station. However, this station would have been closer to the former Ontario Science Centre's main entrance than Science Centre station (later Don Valley station).

=== Thorncliffe Park ===
Thorncliffe Park station will be located on the north side of Overlea Boulevard over Thorncliffe Park Drive. (Overlea Boulevard and Thorncliffe Park Drive intersect at two places within Thorncliffe Park. The station is at the western of the two intersections.) As of June 2021, Metrolinx had not indicated the location of entrances and exits for this station.

=== Cosburn ===
Cosburn station will be located at Cosburn Avenue and have a centre platform. It will be located under the west side of Pape Avenue so as to avoid digging up Pape Avenue itself during construction. As of June 2021, Metrolinx had not indicated the location of entrances and exits for this station. This station will serve Pape Village.

=== Pape ===
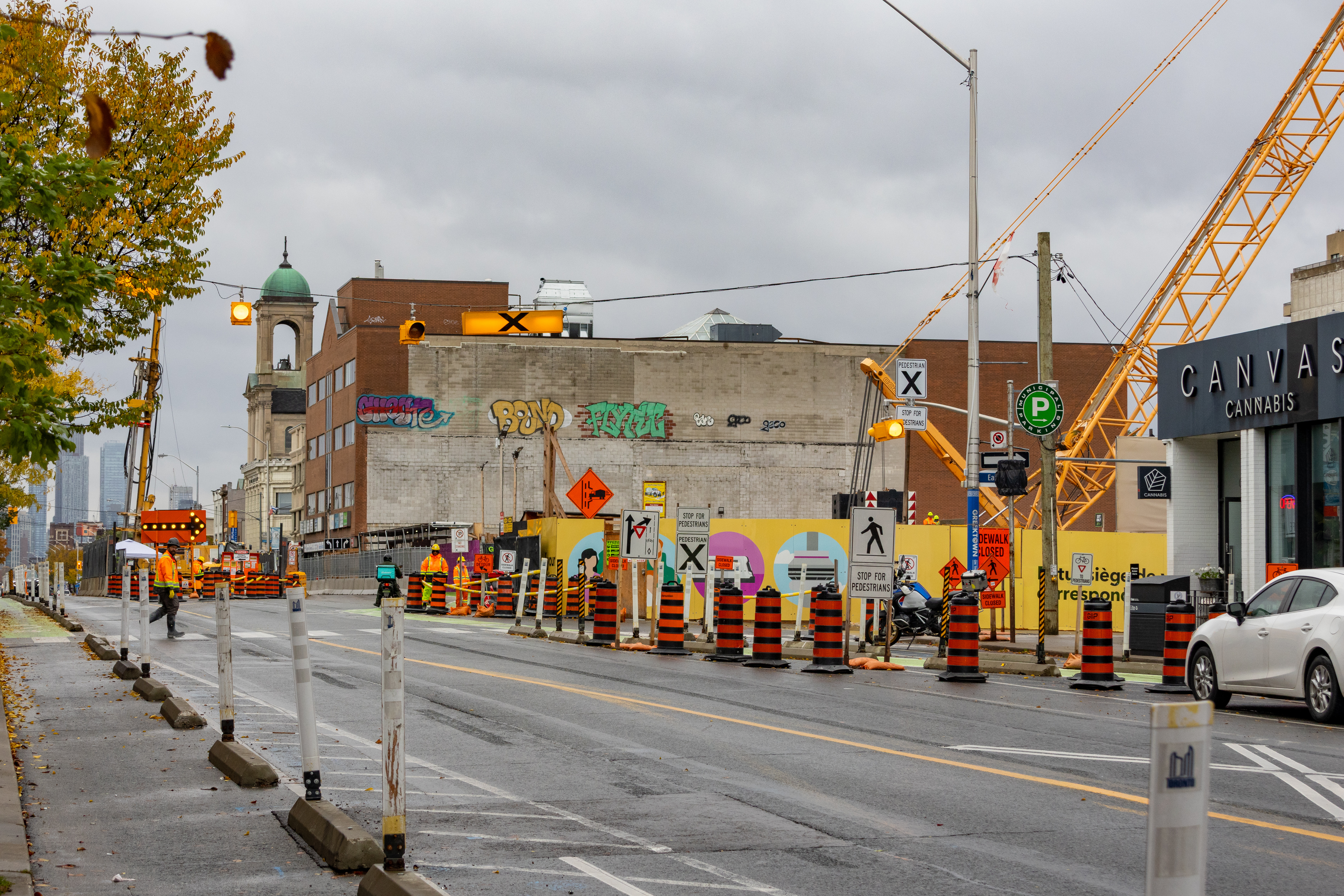
Construction at Pape station along Danforth Avenue in October 2025

The Ontario Line will serve the existing Pape station, providing a connection to Line 2 Bloor–Danforth at Danforth Avenue. Running slightly east of Pape Avenue, the Ontario Line will have a centre platform under Line 2 at the station. Metrolinx expects the Ontario Line connection at Pape station will reduce rush-hour congestion at Bloor–Yonge station by 22 percent. There are plans for an additional station entry directly from Danforth Avenue. This station serves the Greektown neighbourhood.

=== Gerrard ===
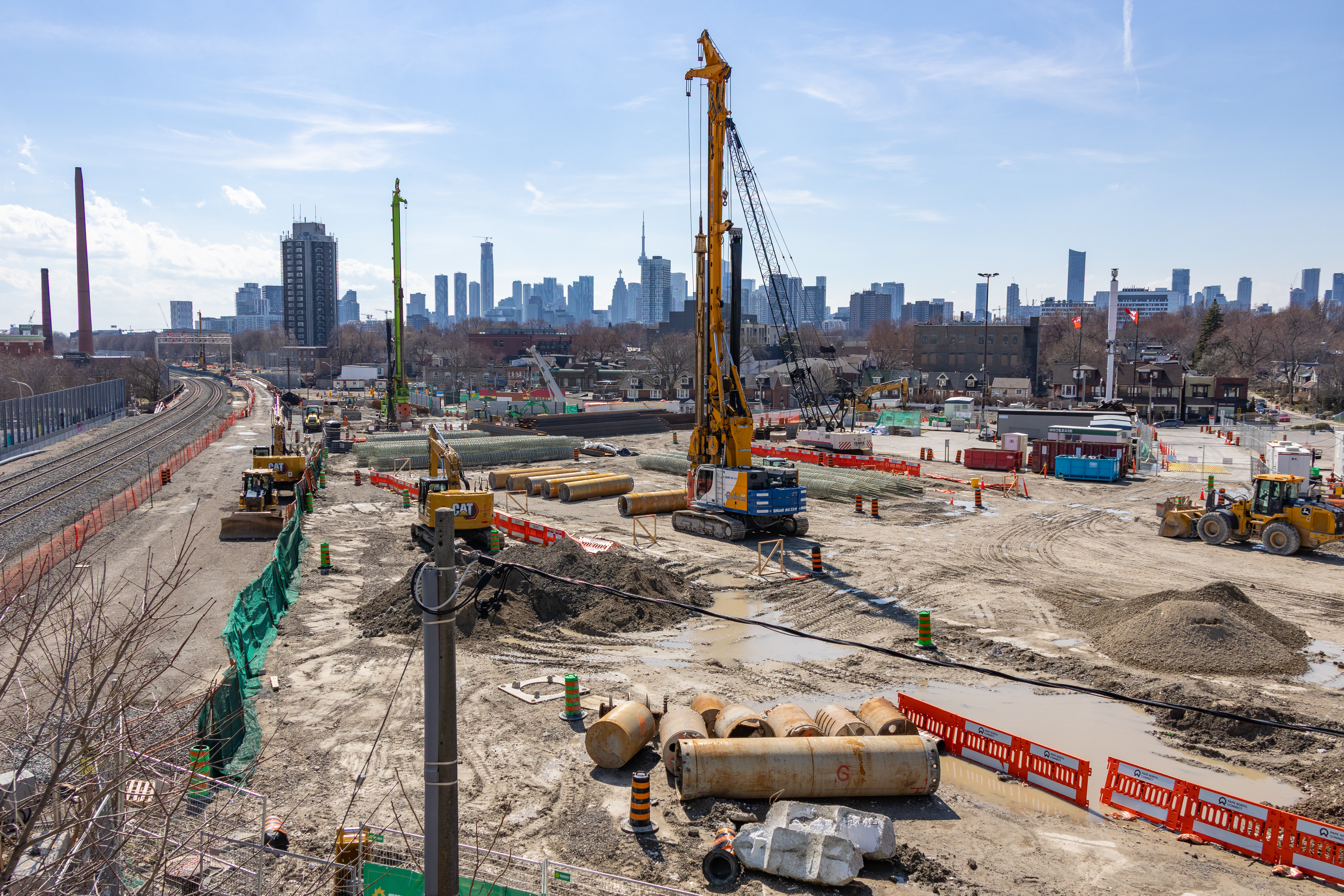
Construction near Gerrard station site in April 2026

Gerrard will be located diagonally over the intersection of Gerrard Street East and Carlaw Avenue west of the Gerrard Square shopping mall. A retail strip mall with a No Frills supermarket was demolished to make way for the station structure.

The station structure will be separate from the parallel railway bridge and embankment. The Ontario Line station will have centre platforms and two entrances. One entrance will be on the east side of Carlaw Avenue north of Gerrard Street. A second entrance will be on the south side of Gerrard Street adjacent to Gerrard Carlaw Parkette.

=== Leslieville ===
Initially named Riverside–Leslieville, Leslieville will be located on the railway bridge over Queen Street East on the boundary between the Riverside (west side) and Leslieville (east side) neighbourhoods. The elevated Ontario Line station will have a centre platform and two entrances. One entrance will be on the north side of Queen Street under the bridge. A second entrance will be on the south side of Queen Street at the west side of the railway embankment. The GO Transit rail corridor will be on the east side of the Ontario Line tracks, but there will be no GO Transit railway station here. Metrolinx plans to rebuild the bridge over Queen Street in order to have it rise 5 metres (16 ft) over street level instead of the current 3.9 metres (13 ft).

=== East Harbour ===
East Harbour will be a transit hub connecting with GO Transit trains and will be located between Eastern Avenue and the Don River along GO Transit's Lakeshore East / Stouffville rail corridor. It is also a proposed station for SmartTrack service. There is also a future proposal to extend streetcar service south along Broadview Avenue into the Port Lands in the vicinity of East Harbour station. A transit-oriented development will be built near the station on former industrial land.

East Harbour station will be built along the existing railway embankment. The station would have six tracks passing through it, two tracks for the Ontario Line on the northwest side of the railway embankment plus four tracks for GO trains on its southeast side. At East Harbour, there would be three platforms each serving a pair of tracks: one platform for Ontario Line trains for both directions on both sides of the platform, one for westbound GO trains and another for eastbound GO trains.

=== Distillery District ===
Initially titled Corktown, Distillery District station will be located at the southeast corner of King and Berkeley Streets straddling the Corktown and Old Town neighbourhoods and also serves the Distillery District. There will be an emergency exit on the north side of Front Street, just east of Berkeley Street. The tunnel will be under the land on the east side of Berkeley Street. The two city blocks bounded by Berkeley, King and Parliament Streets, and north of Parliament Square Park will be razed for tunnel launch shafts. (Construction would not affect the park itself.) The southern city block is the site of the First Parliament, and Metrolinx is allowing archeologists to examine the site for artifacts before it is destroyed by construction. Once the site is prepared, a tunnel-boring machine will launch north and west from the site while another launches south and east towards the Don Yard.

=== Moss Park ===
Moss Park station will be located at the northwest corner of Queen and Sherbourne Streets next to the Moss Park Arena. At this point, the line will be under the southern edge of Moss Park (where the Moss Park Armoury is located), rather than under Queen Street. Only one entrance is planned, and plans for an emergency exit are not yet known.

In February 2023, Metrolinx cut down 61 trees to prepare the station site for construction. The trees were about 70 years old at the time of removal.

=== Queen ===
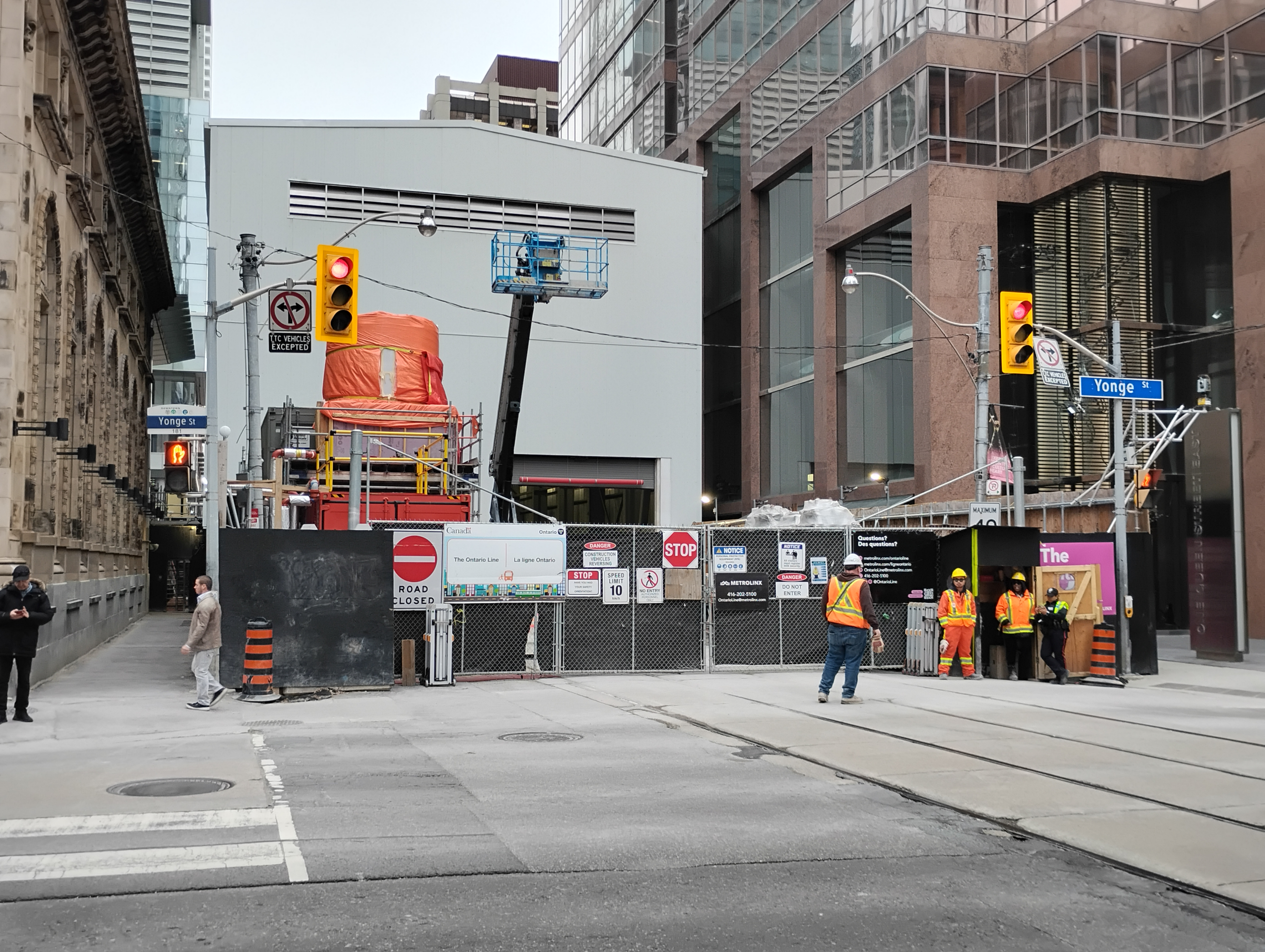
Yonge and Queen Streets closed for construction at Queen station in April 2026, with an acoustic shelter to reduce noise

The line will serve the existing Queen station, providing a connection to Line 1 Yonge–University at Yonge Street. Running under Queen Street, it will cross under Line 1 at the station; the Lower Queen roughed-in ghost station (a remnant of the never-completed Queen subway line) will be used for transferring between the two lines. Queen station already has seven entrances, including some in the main section of Toronto Eaton Centre and in the Hudson's Bay Queen Street complex, and no additional entrances are planned.

Because of the urban density near Queen station, in August 2021, Metrolinx proposed closing Queen Street to road traffic between Victoria and Bay Streets and to streetcar traffic between Church and York Streets for 4.5 years for station construction. Road access would still be available to access parking facilities and truck delivery areas. Pedestrian access would also be provided. Metrolinx would construct new eastbound streetcar tracks along York and Adelaide Streets. During the Queen Street closure, westbound 501 Queen streetcars would divert via Church, Richmond and York Streets while eastbound streetcars would divert via York, Adelaide and Church Streets. The diversions would use what would normally be non-revenue streetcar tracks. However, this plan had to be delayed because of the discovery of utility conflicts in late 2022; thus, the plan was revised to divert the 501 Queen streetcar via Dundas Street between Broadview Avenue and McCaul Street for ten months and to operate a bus replacement service to serve bypassed stops along Queen Street.

=== Osgoode ===
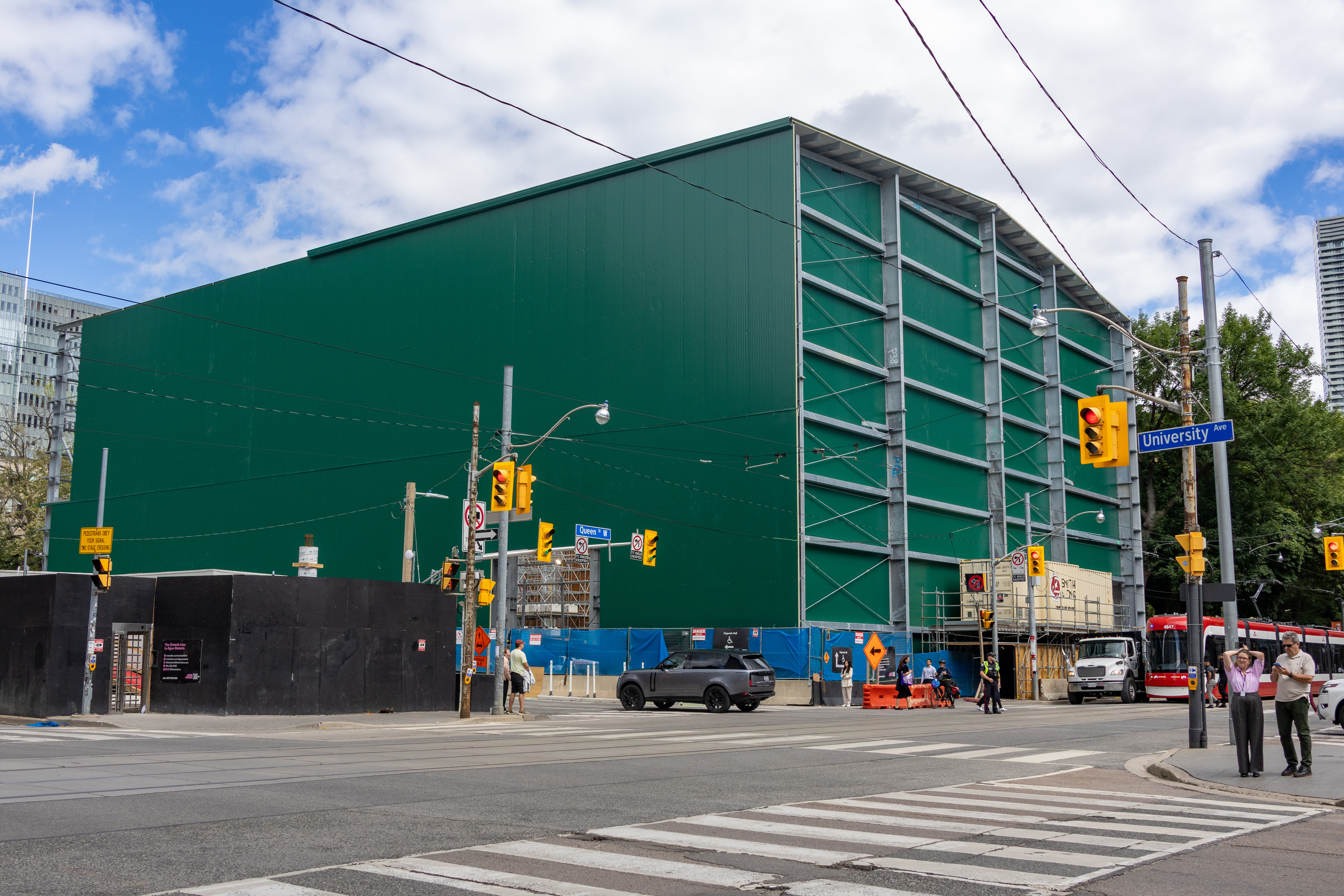
Construction at the site of Osgoode station with an acoustic shelter, August 2025

The line will serve the existing Osgoode station, providing a connection to Line 1 Yonge–University. At University Avenue, the Ontario Line will run under Queen Street and cross under Line 1 at the station. The station will have two additional entrances. One entrance will be at the northeast corner of Queen Street and University Avenue. This will be in a corner of the gardens on the Osgoode Hall grounds. A second new entrance will be at the southwest corner of Queen and Simcoe Streets, one block west of University Avenue, where a bank building stands. The façade of the bank building will be dismantled and preserved for use on the new station entrance building.

In May 2022, Mayor John Tory and the Law Society of Ontario objected to placing an entrance on a corner of the Osgoode Hall grounds as this would require the removal of a section of lawn, some large trees that were planted during World War II, and a section of the cast-iron fence that encloses the grounds. The city preferred that space be taken from the northbound lanes on University Avenue, but Metrolinx said building a shaft there would conflict with Line 1 running below. A consultant's report, dated February 1, 2023, and commissioned by the City of Toronto, concluded that the corner of the Osgoode Hall grounds was the best site for a headhouse based on various criteria but that the Campbell House grounds was a potentially feasible alternative site. On February 4, Metrolinx began work to remove eleven trees on the Osgoode Hall site but had to pause work due to court injunctions, one filed by the Law Society of Ontario and later another by the Haudenosaunee Development Institute, an Indigenous organization. On February 21, 2023, the Ontario Divisional Court dismissed the last injunction, allowing Metrolinx to proceed with removing the trees the next day.

=== Chinatown ===
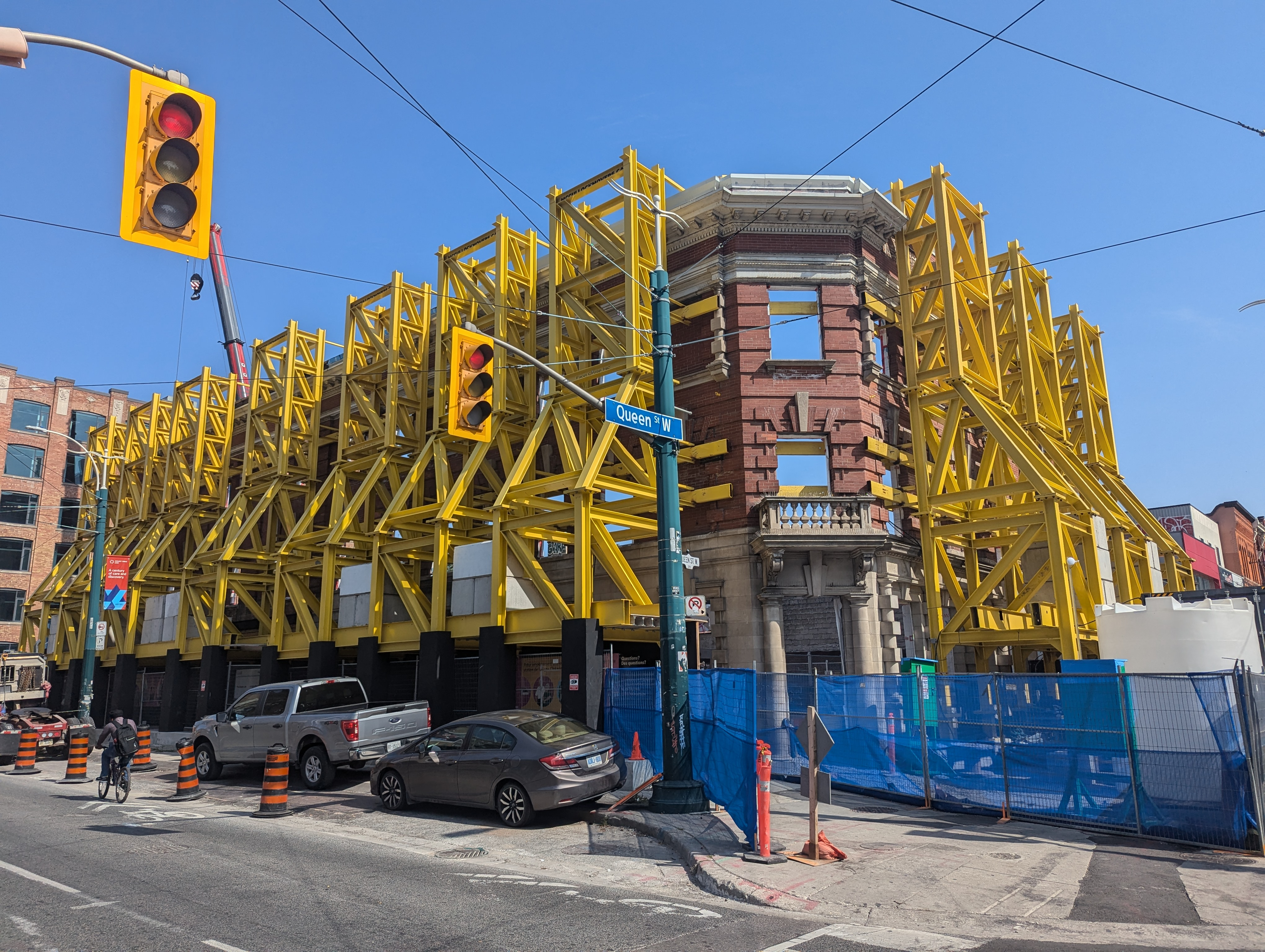
The future Chinatown station is reusing part of an existing bank building through a design approach known as facadism.

Initially titled Queen–Spadina, Chinatown station will be located directly under Queen Street West at its intersection with Spadina Avenue. Station entrances will be located at the southwest and northeast corners of the intersection and Ontario Line riders will be able to transfer to 501 Queen or 510 Spadina streetcars. The station building design will feature heritage attributes by retaining the façade of buildings to be demolished for station construction. This station will serve the Fashion District and the southern end of Chinatown.

=== King West ===
Initially titled King–Bathurst, King West station will be located at the intersection of King Street West and Bathurst Street. The line will pass diagonally under the southeast corner of the intersection. Station entrances will be located at the northeast and southeast corners of the intersection. Connections to the 504 King and 511 Bathurst streetcars will be available on the surface. The station building design will feature heritage attributes by retaining the façade of buildings to be demolished for station construction. This station will serve the Fashion District.

=== Exhibition ===
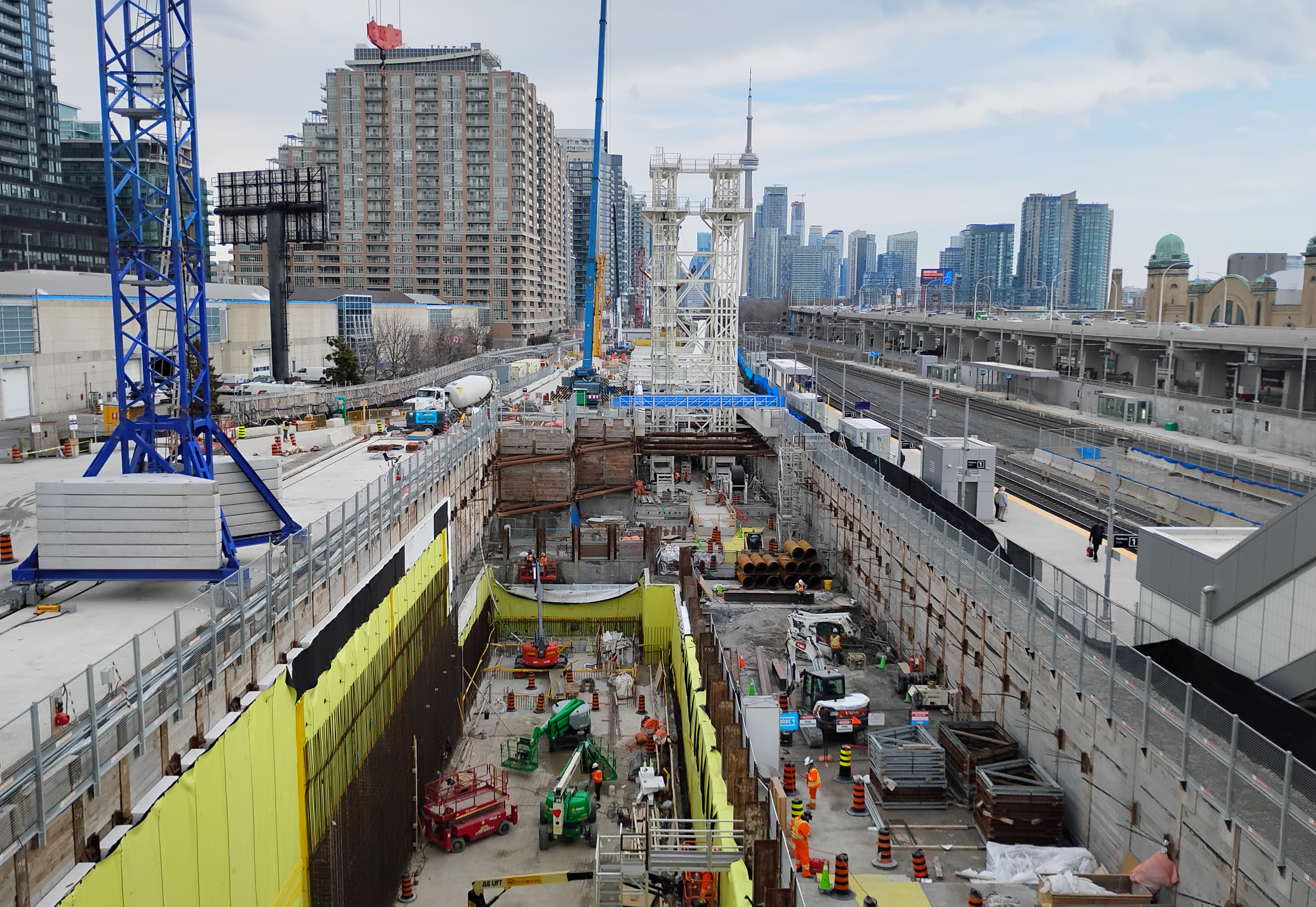
Exhibition station under construction in April 2026

Exhibition station will be located on the north side of Exhibition GO Station along GO Transit's Lakeshore West rail corridor. There will be a shared concourse between the Ontario Line and GO Transit train services. A Metrolinx goal is to reduce congestion at Union Station by 14 percent by encouraging passengers to use the Ontario Line. Riders can also transfer to the 509 and 511 streetcars at Exhibition Loop.

The portal to the tunnelled portion of the line will be just east of the station platforms. Tail tracks will extend west of the platforms to Dufferin Street for storing and turning back trains and a possible future extension. At Exhibition station, the Ontario Line will have separate arrival and departure platforms with the turnback switches being west of the platforms. 153 Dufferin Street, opposite Dufferin Gate Loop, is planned to be an eventual substation. A new station entrance will be built at 1 Atlantic Avenue to serve Liberty Village to the north.

== Possible expansion plans ==
In February 2022, the Ontario Ministry of Transportation (MTO) released the Connecting the GGH: A Transportation Plan for the Greater Golden Horseshoe to provide a 30-year vision for enhanced mobility within and across the Greater Golden Horseshoe (GGH), including future expansion plans for the Ontario Line. In the document, the MTO proposed a conceptual cross-regional rapid transit corridor that includes a "transit loop that connects the Ontario Line to new major transit hubs where regional services connect, including Toronto Pearson International Airport in Mississauga and Richmond Hill Centre, and to other subway and GO Rail lines".

On March 20, 2024, City of Toronto staff presented a report to city council on corridor evaluation results for the prioritization of planned higher-order transit projects, which yielded the following results:

- Ontario Line north extension from Don Valley station to Steeles Avenue (second highest priority)
- Ontario Line west extension from Exhibition GO Station / Ontario Place to Dundas West station (lowest priority)
