= Exhibition GO Station =

Railway station in Toronto, Ontario

Exhibition
- Station platform in 2026

General information
- Location: Manitoba Drive; Toronto, Ontario; Canada
- Coordinates: 43°38′09″N 79°25′08″W
- Platforms: 2 side platforms
- Tracks: 2 + 2 central bypass tracks
- Connections: at Exhibition Loop

Construction
- Cycle facilities: Rack
- Accessible: Yes

Other information
- Station code: GO Transit: EX
- Fare zone: 02

History
- Opened: 1968; 58 years ago
- Opening: 2030s (Ontario Line; planned)
- Electrified: September 2035; 8 years' time (Lakeshore West; planned)

Passengers
- 2019: 966,400

Services
Preceding station	GO Transit	Following station
Mimico towards Confederation	Lakeshore West	Union Terminus
Port Credit towards Niagara Falls	Lakeshore West (off-peak express)	Union Terminus
Future services
Preceding station	Toronto Transit Commission	Following station
Terminus	Ontario Line (opens 2030s)	King West towards Don Valley
Location

Exhibition GO Station is a railway station in Toronto, Ontario, Canada. The station is a stop on GO Transit's Lakeshore West line. It is located west of downtown Toronto at Exhibition Place, an area of convention and exhibition venues, sports facilities, and other entertainment attractions, restaurants and nightclubs. It is also on the south side of Liberty Village, a former industrial area which has been redeveloped into a residential neighbourhood with retail and restaurants.

Although the station is widely used during the Canadian National Exhibition, it also serves other major events that take place in and around the Exhibition grounds and their venues, including Coca-Cola Coliseum, Enercare Centre, Medieval Times, Liberty Grand, BMO Field, Ontario Place and RBC Amphitheatre.

== Transit connections ==
Directly in front of the station there is a connection with Toronto Transit Commission buses on Dufferin route 29C and at the nearby Exhibition Loop with 511 Bathurst and 509 Harbourfront streetcar lines.

A suggestion was made in 2013 to integrate TTC and GO Transit fares so that riders from the adjoining Liberty Village neighbourhood would not have to pay full fare again when transferring between the GO train and TTC services. This proposal was also seen as a way to help ease rush hour congestion on the 504 King streetcar. This policy was implemented in February 2024 under the broader One Fare program.

== History ==
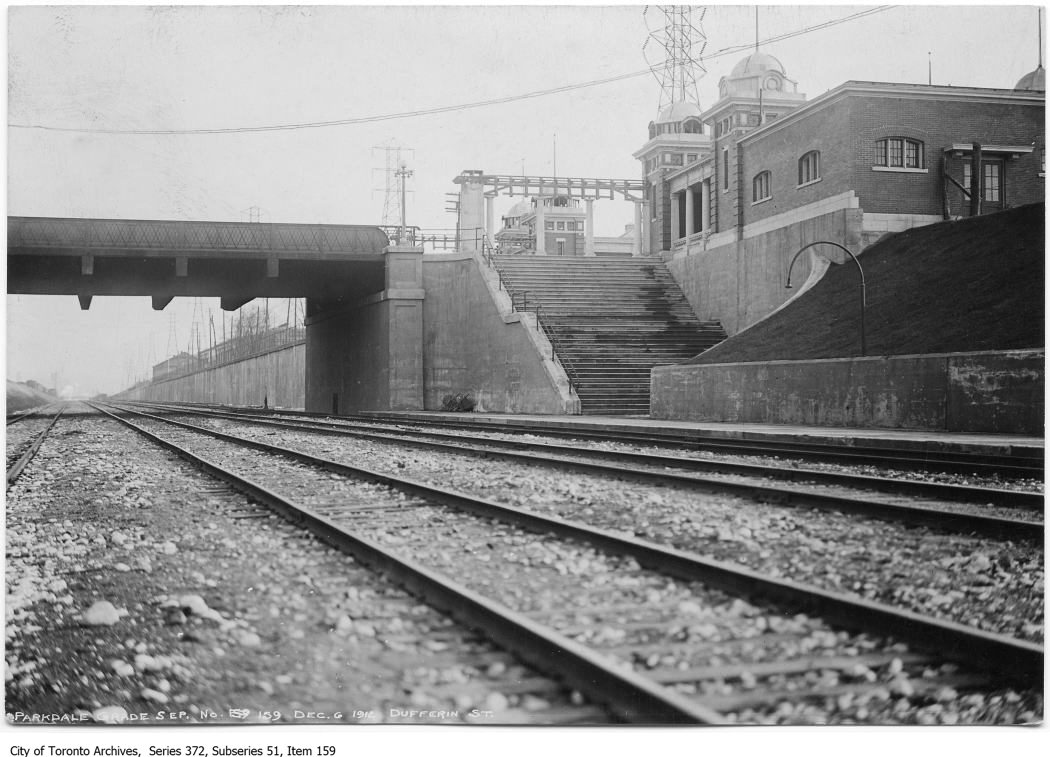
1912 Grand Trunk station at the Dufferin Gates

The original Grand Trunk Railway station consisted of a wooden frame building, located on the south side of the tracks just east of Dufferin Street. The grade separation, which was done between 1910 and 1912, resulted in the demolition of that station since it was necessary to build a retaining wall along the south side of the cutting. New Dufferin Gates were constructed at the entrance to Exhibition Place, with concrete stairs down to two side platforms west of the new bridge over the tracks. Passenger service continue to operate there until the 1960s.

Work to widen the platforms and add a snowmelt system, an accessible boarding area, and platform canopies began in the fourth quarter of 2012 and was completed in the second quarter of 2016.

== Future ==
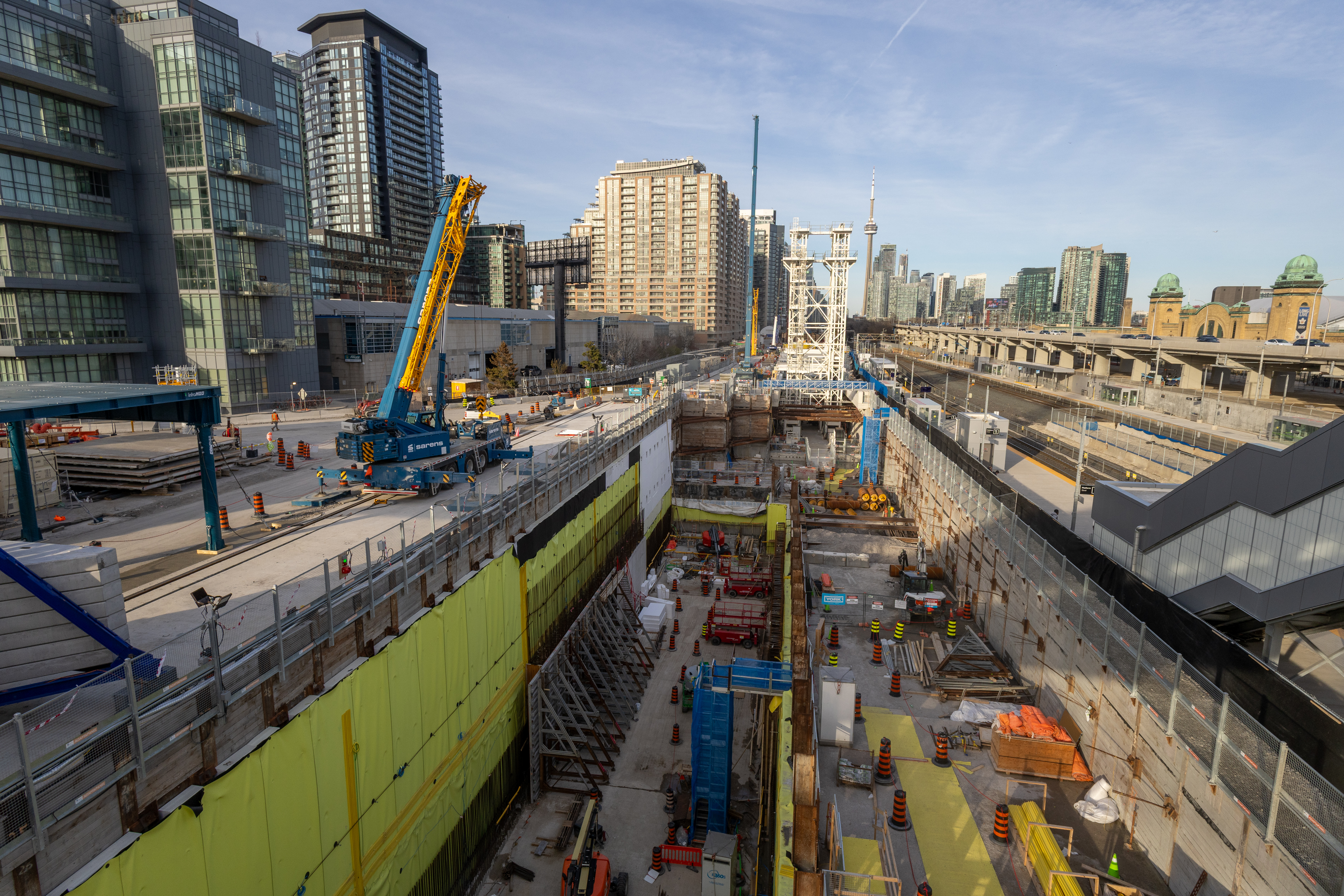
Construction of the Ontario Line station at Exhibition in April 2026

Construction of a new station structure at Exhibition in October 2026

Exhibition will be the southwestern terminus of the under-construction Ontario Line. The Ontario Line platforms will be north of the current Lakeshore West line tracks. The line is targeted for a 2030 opening. A much larger station structure is planned as part of that work; as a result, in late 2023 work began on a temporary pedestrian overpass to handle passenger volumes during construction.
