= Four Seasons Centre =

2,071-seat theatre in Toronto

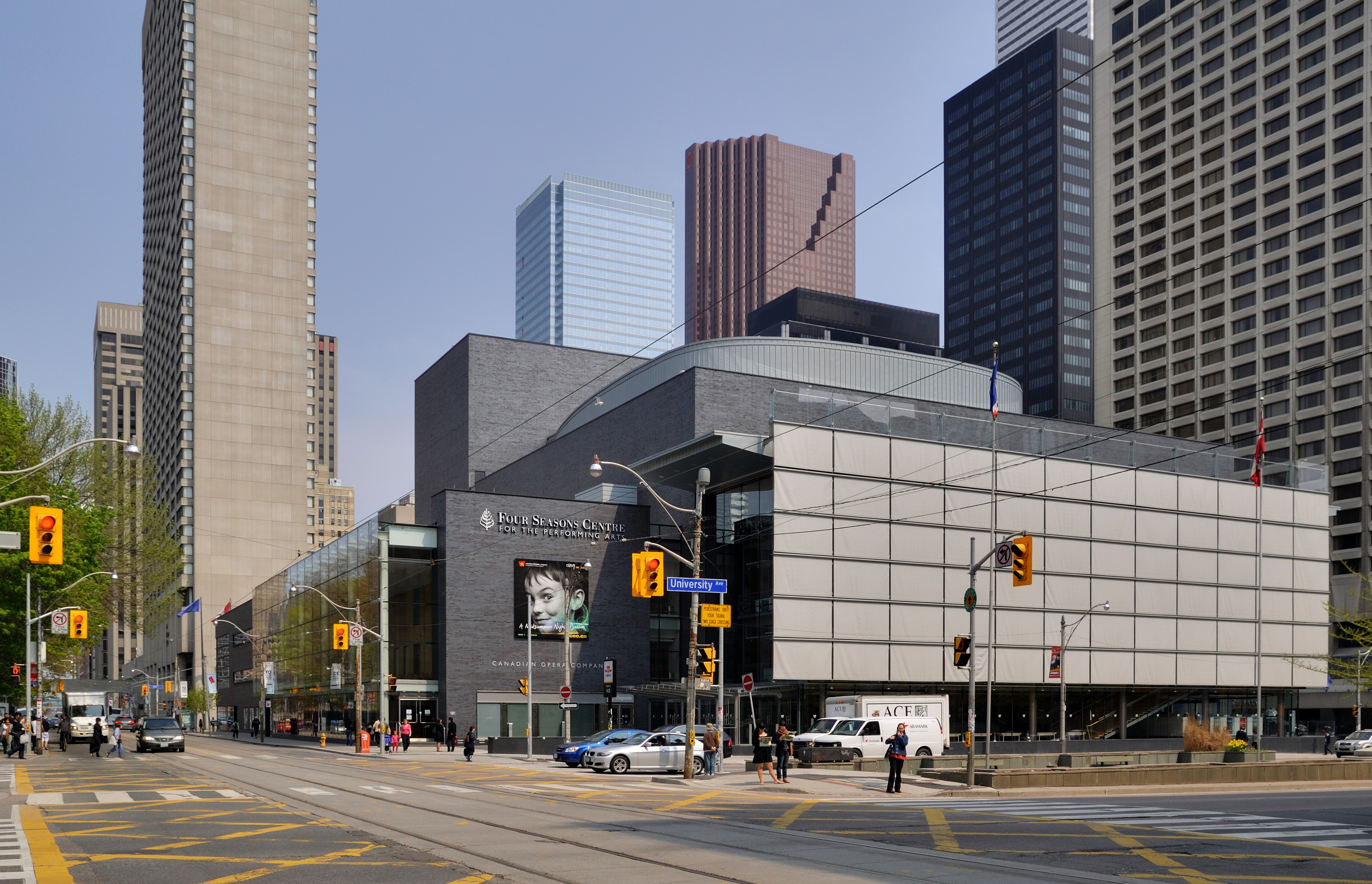
- Four Seasons Centre seen from University Avenue with sun shades covering its glazed facade
- Interactive map of Four Seasons Centre
- Address: 145 Queen Street West; Toronto, Ontario; M5H 4G1
- Coordinates: 43°39′02″N 79°23′08″W
- Owner: Canadian Opera House Corporation
- Capacity: 2,071
- Type: Opera house

Construction
- Opened: 14 June 2006
- Cost: CA$181 million
- Architects: Diamond+Schmitt; Fisher Dachs Associates

Tenants
- Canadian Opera Company; National Ballet of Canada

The Four Seasons Centre for the Performing Arts is a 2,071-seat theatre in Toronto, Ontario, Canada, located at the southeast corner of University Avenue and Queen Street West, across from Osgoode Hall. The land on which it is located was a gift from the Government of Ontario. It is the home of the Canadian Opera Company (COC) and the National Ballet of Canada. The building's modernist design by was created by Canadian firm Diamond Schmitt Architects, headed by Jack Diamond. It was completed in 2006, and the interior design includes an unusual glass staircase.

== History ==
In the 1980s, the Canadian Opera Company and financier Hal Jackman, president of the Ballet Opera House Corporation, had begun lobbying for a new building to replace the O'Keefe Centre (now known as Meridian Hall). This building had housed the opera company for about 40 years. The company had also previously been housed in the Hart House Theatre, the Royal Alexandra Theatre (Royal Alex), and the Elgin Theatre.

The opera company was unhappy with the O'Keefe due to its multi-purpose design, which compromised it for opera. The hall was too large, causing poor acoustics for opera. The O'Keefe had to use sound amplification, considered less than ideal for many operas. It did not have enough storage space for the company to store multiple production sets. Its orchestra space was too small. The company produced opera productions elsewhere, such as the Royal Alex and the Elgin, both smaller venues suitable for smaller productions, although each had limitations.

=== Bay Street proposal ===
In 1984, Ontario Premier Bill Davis promised that a piece of provincially owned land at Bay Street and Wellesley Street would be the home for the new opera house. The lot was estimated to be worth some CA$75 million.

A design competition was won by the postmodern project of Moshe Safdie. In 1988, the project was approved and the existing stores and government offices on the site were demolished.

After a new Ontario New Democratic Party (NDP) provincial government under Bob Rae was elected in 1990, inheriting a large deficit because of a recession, the CA$311 million project was deemed excessively costly. The province was also dealing with the unexpectedly high CA$550 million cost of the SkyDome project. When the opera house corporation refused to modify the design to lower costs, the government withdrew its funding commitment two months after the election. In 1992, the province cancelled the project and the land was sold to developers. Two towers in the "Opera Place I and II" development have been built on Bay Street (1998), but as of June 2011, the rest of the property remained vacant until the Teahouse Condo was completed in 2020.

=== University Avenue project ===
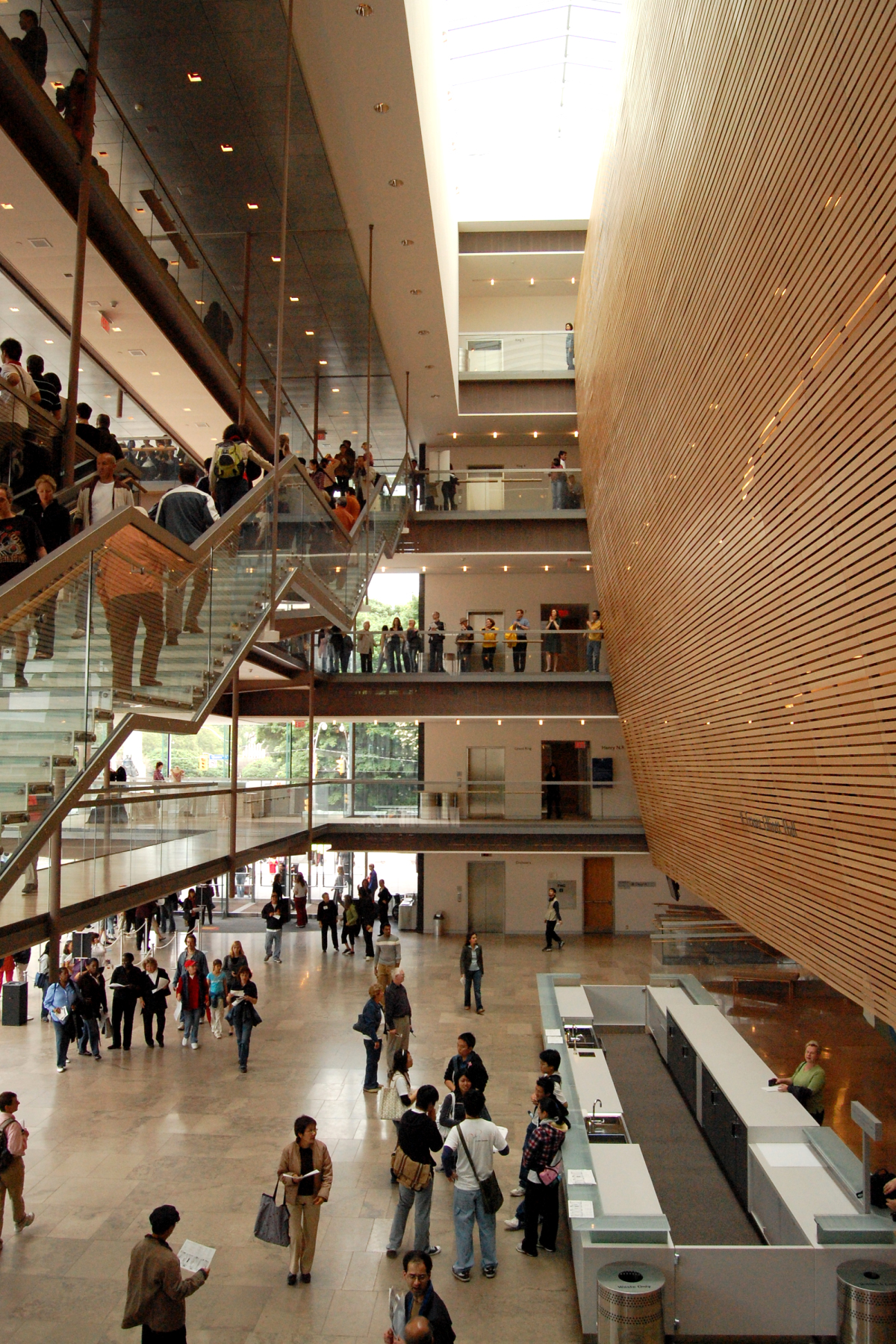
Interior of the Four Seasons Centre

In 1997, the province allocated a parking lot, which previously housed offices for the Supreme Court of Ontario at Queen and University, for the project. The lot was valued at CA$31 million, and the federal and provincial governments also pledged funding for a new, more modest project that would cost about CA$130 million. The provincial government agreed to sell the lot to the Canadian Opera Company for CA$16 million.

That year, the opera company under Richard Bradshaw issued an invitation for designs. Ten architectural firms submitted proposals, and the modernist design by Canadian company Diamond Schmitt Architects, headed by Jack Diamond, was selected.

The original plan called for a 190 m (620 ft) tower of offices and condominiums to be built by Olympia and York which would help fund the project. It would be further supplemented by a CA$20 million donation by Christopher Ondaatje. However, both Olympia and York and Ondaatje developed concerns about the project and withdrew. More importantly, the municipal government of Toronto refused to provide any municipal funding. In 2000, the provincial government rescinded its agreement to sell the land, arguing that the federal government was not providing funding.

Late in 2001, the Government of Canada announced a contribution of CA$25 million to the project, contingent on the Ontario government matching the funding. The arrangement allowed the Ontario government to donate the land as its commitment. In May 2002, the Ontario government accepted the proposal. The company secured a CA$20 million donation from the Four Seasons hotel chain in exchange for perpetual naming rights to the centre. Jackman donated CA$5 million. The Ontario government provided another CA$10 million in 2006. The centre took three years to construct at an estimated cost of CA$181 million, exceeding its CA$150 million budget. To provide wheelchair accessibility, elevator access to the concourse level of Osgoode subway station was integrated into the construction of the centre. The centre had its formal ground-breaking in April 2003.

The centre had its grand opening on 14 June 2006 with a gala concert. Nathan Philips Square hosted an outdoor celebration. At the Four Seasons, the production was a selection from various operas, with arias by Ben Heppner, Aline Kutan, Allyson McHardy, Adrianne Pieczonka, Gerald Finley, Robert Pomakov, and Brett Polegato. There were choruses by the ensemble and an orchestra interlude, including the finale of Beethoven's Ninth Symphony. A fund-raising dinner was served on stage following the performance, with attendees paying CA$2,000 per dinner. The National Ballet of Canada had its opening gala on 22 June 2006.

Regularly scheduled performances commenced on 12 September 2006 with the inaugural production in the new opera house being Richard Wagner's epic tetralogy Der Ring des Nibelungen (The Ring of the Nibelung), conducted by Richard Bradshaw and designed by Michael Levine who also directed Das Rheingold. Atom Egoyan directed Die Walkure, Francois Girard Siegfried and Tim Albery Gotterdammerung. Governor General Michaëlle Jean and other prominent Canadians attended the event. Three complete Ring Cycles were performed in the autumn of 2006.

== Design ==
The building has been described as "best experienced from the inside," and "outside blah, inside awe." To meet its budget, the opera house construction focused on the interior hall, especially its acoustics, and its "City Room" foyer with its large glass facade. Except for the main facade facing University Avenue and the Queen-University corner, the exterior walls are solid, with a few windows, and unadorned. Toronto Star critic Christopher Hume summed it up: "To those for whom an opera house is simply a venue for musical theatre, it will be welcomed with open arms. To those for whom an opera house is a symbol of civic greatness, it will be a disappointment."

=== R. Fraser Elliott Hall ===
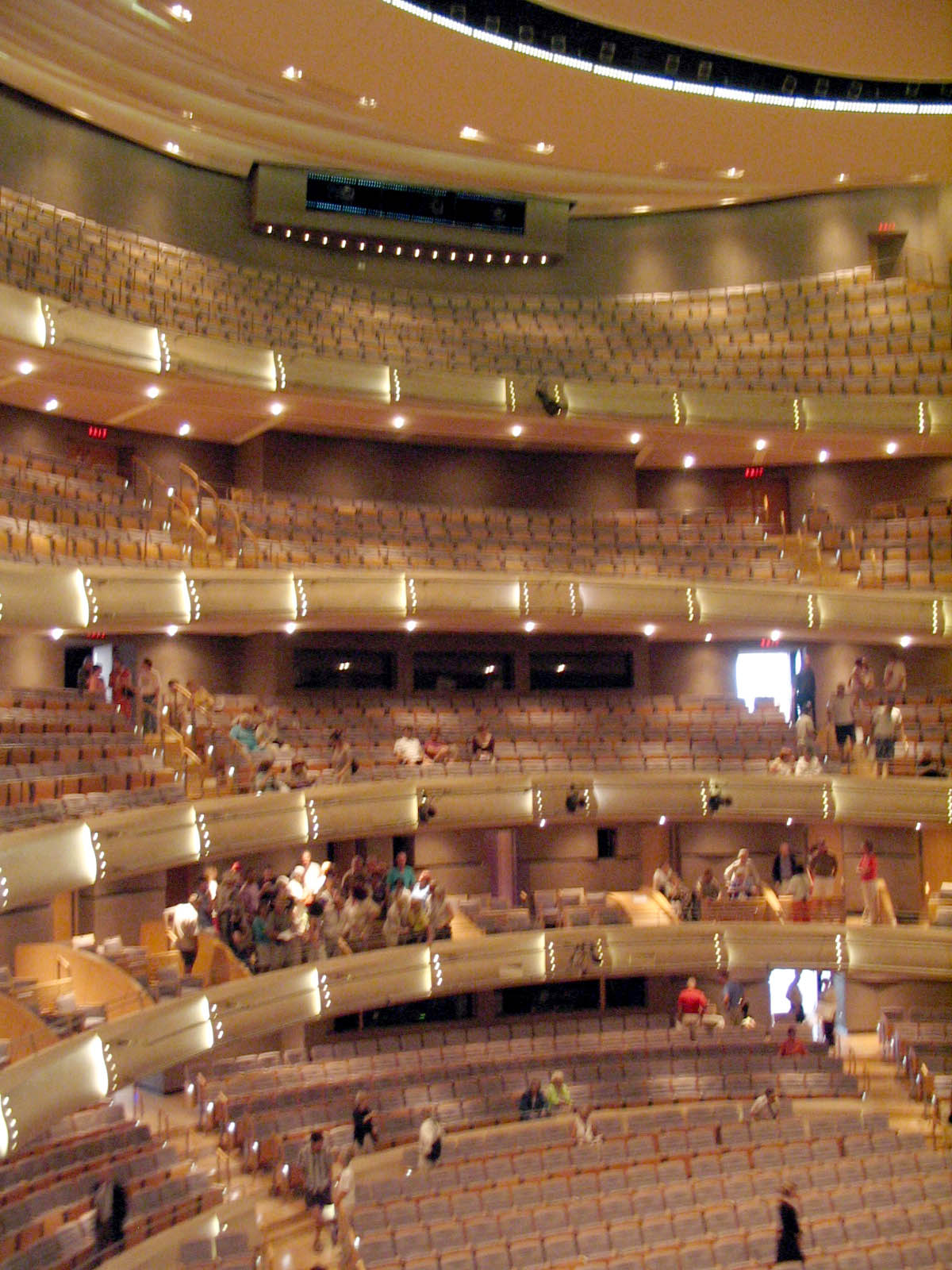
R. Fraser Elliott Hall

The five-tiered, horseshoe-shaped auditorium was modelled after European opera houses and, specifically, on the dimensions and configuration of the National Theatre Munich with which Richard Bradshaw was well acquainted. Collaborating with Diamond Schmitt, New York-based theatre planning and design specialists Fisher Dachs Associates arranged the room's geometry and seating configuration to bring each of the 2,000 seats, including tiered balconies, as close to the stage as possible while maintaining an unobstructed view. Other design elements reflect historic performance halls, including the Roman Amphitheatre.

The acoustics were designed by Bob Essert of Sound Space Design and a team that included Aercoustics Engineering, Wilson Ihrig and Engineering Harmonics. The undulating back walls of the venue, which diffuse the sound throughout the auditorium by reflecting the sound waves back to the stage, account for about 90 percent of the audible sound for the audience. To prevent audience members from detecting specific sounds and vibrations including traffic noise, the rumble from the adjacent Line 1 Yonge–University subway line and 501 Queen streetcar line, and even the sirens of the emergency vehicles rushing to the nearby hospitals, the theatre sits on 489 rubber insulating pads.

The hall is named after Toronto lawyer and businessman R. Fraser Elliott, who contributed CA$10 million to the project. Elliott died one year before the hall opened. Elliott had served on the board of the Canadian Opera Company.

=== Exterior ===
The hall was constructed on a limited budget, using contrasting materials. The City Room glass walls, curtain walls held by steel fixtures, look out on University Ave and Queen Street. The east, south and north sides are clad in dark brick. Windows on the north side have a view of Osgoode Hall, but the exterior on that side is unadorned.

On the west is the sidewalk extension City Room, which is transparent and which illuminates the street. The solid, massive eastern facade broken only by horizontal windows, in contrast, blends into its office building and brick surroundings, towards York Street. John Bentley Mays states in his 2006 Canadian Architect article that East wall is "unresponsive to the need of vitality on the street." The southern, Richmond Street facade, also plain brick punctuated by dressing room windows, is opposite the Hilton Hotel. Architect Diamond defended his rather plain design, stating, "You do not make a city out of iconic pieces."

Two exterior features were omitted to reduce costs. Along Richmond Street, a glass facade overhanging the sidewalk was omitted and replaced with a blank wall. A roof garden was also not built.

=== Richard Bradshaw Amphitheatre ===
The Richard Bradshaw Amphitheatre in the City Room links Rings three and four. It provides seating for 100 patrons. During the season several concerts per week in a variety of genres are presented here.

== Operatic and other production history ==
Outside of the standard opera repertory, some of the less-often performed, new works, or national premieres performed by the Canadian Opera Company include:

- 2006: R. Wagner: Der Ring des Nibelungen (Canadian premiere)
- 2007: Shostakovich: Lady Macbeth of Mtsensk
- 2008: Janáček: From the House of the Dead
- 2010: Donizetti: Maria Stuarda
- 2011: Iphigenia in Tauris
- 2012: Kaija Saariaho: Love from Afar
- 2012: Zemlinski: A Florentine Tragedy / Puccini: Gianni Schicchi
- 2012: Semele
- 2018: Rufus Wainwright: Hadrian

Dancap Productions presented musicals at the Four Seasons Centre, including:

- 2010: Schönberg/Boublil/Maltby Jr: Miss Saigon
- 2010: Rodgers/Hammerstein: South Pacific
- 2011: Tom Kitt/Brian Yorkey: Next to Normal
- 2011: Colm Wilkinson in Concert
- 2011: Twyla Tharp: Come Fly Away

== See also ==
Other performing arts venues in the city include:

- Budweiser Stage
- Massey Hall
- Meridian Arts Centre
- Meridian Hall
- Roy Thomson Hall
- St. Lawrence Centre for the Arts
