= Lubbock Symphony Orchestra =

Orchestra based in Texas

- Orchestra
- Short name: LSO
- Founded: 1946
- Location: Lubbock, Texas
- Concert hall: Buddy Holly Hall
- Music director: David Cho
- Website: lubbocksymphony.org

The Lubbock Symphony Orchestra (LSO) is an orchestra based in Lubbock, Texas, and is one of the oldest community organizations in the region. The orchestra is composed of professional musicians from all parts of the Lubbock community. The orchestra currently performs at Lubbock Memorial Civic Center Theatre but will relocate to the Buddy Holly Hall of Performing Arts and Sciences following the hall's completion. The ensemble is led by David Cho, the orchestra's seventh music director, who has been with the orchestra since 2012.

== History ==
In October 1946, the Lubbock Symphony Orchestra was organized and presented its first concert under the baton of founding conductor William A. Harrod. At that time, the orchestra was entirely a volunteer effort. In 1967, the LSO became a professional organization with paid musicians. Mr. Harrod continued to conduct the orchestra through the spring of 1984. He has been followed by a number of dynamic, and talented conductors including Andrews Sill and Tomasz Golka. The current music director and conductor is David Cho, who began his tenure with the LSO fall 2012.

The Lubbock Symphony Orchestra is now classified by the American Symphony Orchestra League as a group VI Orchestra.

William A. Harrod was introduced to Lubbock while he was in the Air Force and a member of the Air Force Band. He formed a dance band for the enlisted men and women who also were stationed in Lubbock, and soon was "asked to form a community orchestra by the local preachers," he said. "The thing that kept us going early on was the Texas Tech Band and its wonderful musicians. The problem was the lack of strings," he said. "Lubbock only had school bands back then, not school orchestras, so I had to put together a scrub team of fiddle players."

Other Lubbock citizens played major roles in the development of the orchestra, with Harrod more than once citing the contributions of Asher Thompson and Charley Pope.

The orchestra, while founded in 1946, did not become a professional, paid organization until 1967. That played havoc with Harrod's attempts to even hold rehearsals. "That was by far the toughest part," Harrod said. "You see, I could schedule a rehearsal for a concert, but never know for certain who all would be showing up. Musicians would come up to me and say, 'Mr. Harrod, I can play in Amarillo or Abilene or Roswell (N.M.) and all of them will pay me.' They deserved to be paid. That went on until Asher Thompson and Charley Pope made arrangements for the Lubbock Symphony Orchestra members to at least receive token payments," he continued.

== Education and Outreach ==
More than 12,300 learners are served annually through education programs. Each year, the LSO invites students in grades five through twelve to experience a live symphonic performance. Public, private, and home schools from Lubbock and the surrounding communities participate in these free interactive education concerts, which are led by Music Director David Cho. Additionally, the LSO sponsors teaching artists that currently work in 45 classrooms on 12 Lubbock Independent School District campuses, reaching approximately 1035 students. Plans are underway to expand the program to all LISD elementary schools. The LSO also brings music to the schools through the Chamber Ensemble Outreach Program. The educational brass and woodwind quintets and string quartet are composed of LSO musicians and Texas Tech University graduate students. They perform for local third and fourth graders. Students are introduced to each instrument and experience a live performance in an up-close and personal setting. These small ensembles also perform in other settings throughout the community including assisted living facilities, after-school programs, and the Lubbock County Juvenile Justice Center.

== Music directors ==
- William Harrod (1946–1984)
- Patrick Flynn (1985–1986)
- Gürer Aykal (1987–1991)
- Albert George Schram (1992–2000)
- Andrews Sill (2001–2006)
- Tomasz Golka (2007–2012)
- David Cho (2012–)

== David Cho ==
Born in Seoul, Korea, Cho immigrated to the United States in 1985. David received a variety of music lessons during his childhood in Palos Verdes, California, before focusing his energy exclusively on the piano. He later attended Oberlin College and Conservatory where he received his bachelor of music in piano performance.

In 1996, Cho won the E. Nakamichi Concerto Competition at the Aspen Music Festival and was awarded the Arthur Dann Prize at the Oberlin Conservatory. In 1999, while acquiring his master of music in piano performance at the Peabody Institute at Johns Hopkins University, Cho was invited by Robert Spano and Seiji Ozawa to attend the prestigious Tanglewood Music Center as a Merrill Lynch conducting fellow. Cho was then invited by Larry Rachleff to study at Rice University where he served as guest conductor for the Shepherd School Orchestras while acquiring his master of music in instrumental conducting. Cho was subsequently invited by the Vienna Philharmonic as an assistant conductor. As the recipient of the Karajan Fellowship, Cho has enjoyed residencies at the annual Salzburg Festival in Austria. In 2003, David was invited by Leonard Slatkin to participate in the National Conducting Institute during which time he made his début with the National Symphony Orchestra at the John F. Kennedy Center for the Performing Arts.

During the 2003–2004 season, Cho was selected to spend a year as the conducting fellow of the New World Symphony under the mentorship of Michael Tilson Thomas. While on tour with the New World Symphony in New York City, David made his Carnegie Hall début conducting works by Copland and Tchaikovsky. During the orchestra's Rome tour, David made his début at the Academy of Santa Cecilia conducting works by Luciano Berio and John Adams. Cho was then invited by his mentor Larry Rachleff to serve as the resident conductor of the San Antonio Symphony from 2004 to 2006. During the 2006–2007 season, Cho held the Bruno Walter Resident Conductor Chair with the ensemble.

During his tenure as the associate conductor of Utah Symphony and Utah Opera (2006–2011), Cho won first prize at the Eduardo Mata International Conducting Competition in Mexico City which resulted in numerous conducting engagements in Europe, Asia and South America. He has conducted the symphonies of Seattle, Houston, Austin, Memphis, Fort Wayne, Baton Rouge and Shreveport. He has collaborated with such guest artists as Yo-Yo Ma, Renée Fleming, Joshua Bell, Frederica von Stade, Sarah Chang, Daniel Müller-Schott, Jennifer Koh, Leila Josefowicz, Jennifer Frautschi and Alexander Kobrin. During previous summers, Cho made appearances at the Aspen Music Festival and the Grand Teton Music Festival.

After guest appearances with the Lubbock Symphony Orchestra in 2007 and 2009, Cho was appointed as the Lubbock Symphony Orchestra's seventh music director in 2011. He began his tenure with the LSO in the 2012–2013 season and is now actively involved in community engagements.

== Buddy Holly Hall ==
Resulting from years of community studies and focus groups and located in the heart of Downtown Lubbock, the Buddy Holly Hall of Performing Arts and Sciences is a unique model not found anywhere else in the world. The campus features two theaters, event space, a bistro and a ballet academy under one roof.

Designed by Diamond Schmitt Architects, both theatres feature an acoustic value of NC15. A notable feature of the Buddy Holly Hall is the guitar wall, depicting the image of Buddy Holly playing a Stratocaster. Designed by Texas artist Brad Oldham, the image is a 9,000 piece sculpture made of multiple sizes of guitar picks cast of aluminum with brushed bronze.

The Buddy Holly Hall is privately funded, owned and operated by the Lubbock Entertainment and Performing Arts Association, with 100% of all contributions directly funding construction of the project. Innovative partnerships with local arts organizations, public schools and universities, and private corporations will allow the Buddy Holly Hall to be financially self-sustaining upon opening in 2020.
