= Ford Center =

Ford Center may refer to:

- Ford Center (Evansville) - a multi-purpose arena located in downtown Evansville, Indiana
- Ford Center (Oklahoma City), now known as Paycom Center, a multi-purpose arena located in downtown Oklahoma City
- Ford Center at The Star, an indoor stadium and practice facility of the Dallas Cowboys
- Ford Center for the Performing Arts (disambiguation)
