= Montreal Symphony House =

Concert hall in Quebec, Canada

- Maison symphonique de Montréal
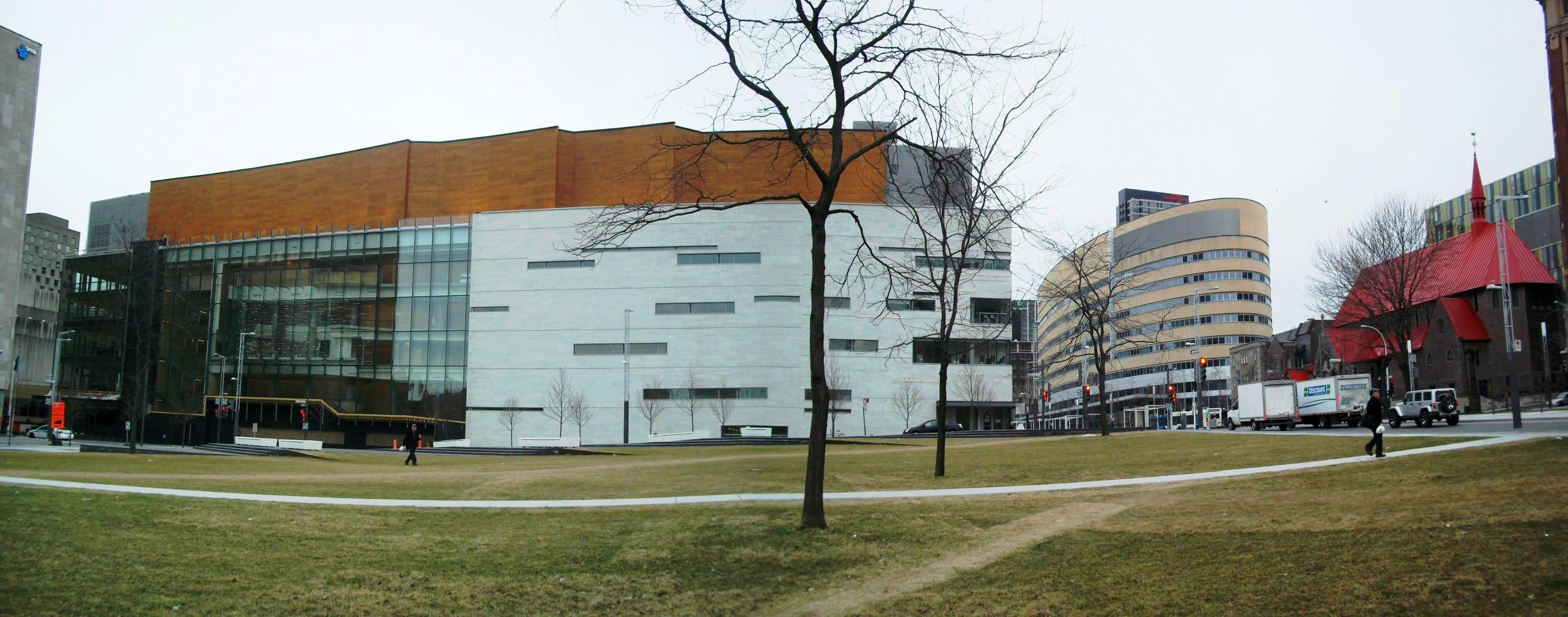
- Interactive map of the Montreal Symphony House area
- Former names: Adresse symphonique

General information
- Location: 1600, rue Saint-Urbain; Montreal, Quebec, Canada; H2X 0S1
- Coordinates: 45.509257°N 73.566856°W
- Construction started: May 2009
- Completed: September 7, 2011

Design and construction
- Architect: Jack Diamond
- Architecture firm: Diamond and Schmitt Architects
- Main contractor: SNC-Lavalin

Other information
- Seating capacity: 2,117

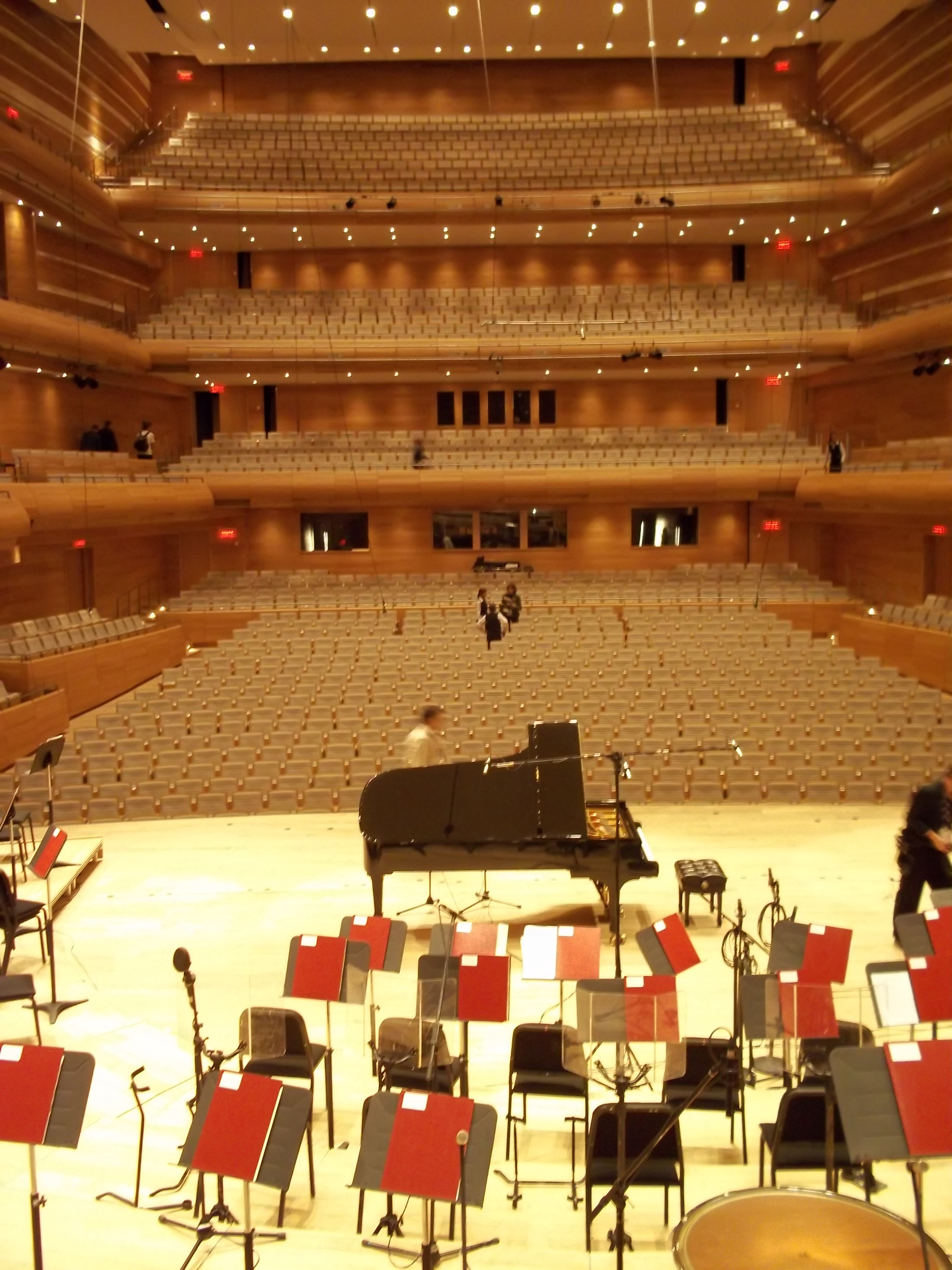
The interior of the Montreal Symphony House.

The Montreal Symphony House (French: Maison symphonique de Montréal) is a concert hall in Montreal, Quebec, Canada. The Montreal Symphony House is located at the corner of de Maisonneuve Boulevard West and Saint Urbain Street, on the northeastern esplanade of Place des Arts in the Quartier des Spectacles.

Construction began in May 2009 and the concert hall was inaugurated September 7, 2011. Initial plans were to name the 2,100-seat venue "Adresse symphonique", however the Quebec government announced on opening day that the hall would be the "Maison symphonique". The hall is home to the Montreal Symphony Orchestra, the Metropolitan Orchestra, I Musici de Montreal, Les Violons du Roy and other classical music ensembles.

On May 24, 2014, the hall inaugurated a $4,000,000 organ (op.3900) by Casavant Frères. The four manual, 83 rank work contains 6,489 pipes. The instrument was a gift of Jacqueline Desmarais in memory of her husband, financier Paul Desmarais.

In 2014, SNC-Lavalin sold its concession rights in a deal worth some $77.6 million. SNC will continue to operate and maintain services for the owner, IA Financial Group, until 2038.
