= Richmond Hill Centre for the Performing Arts =

Coordinates: 43.877193°N 79.439049°W

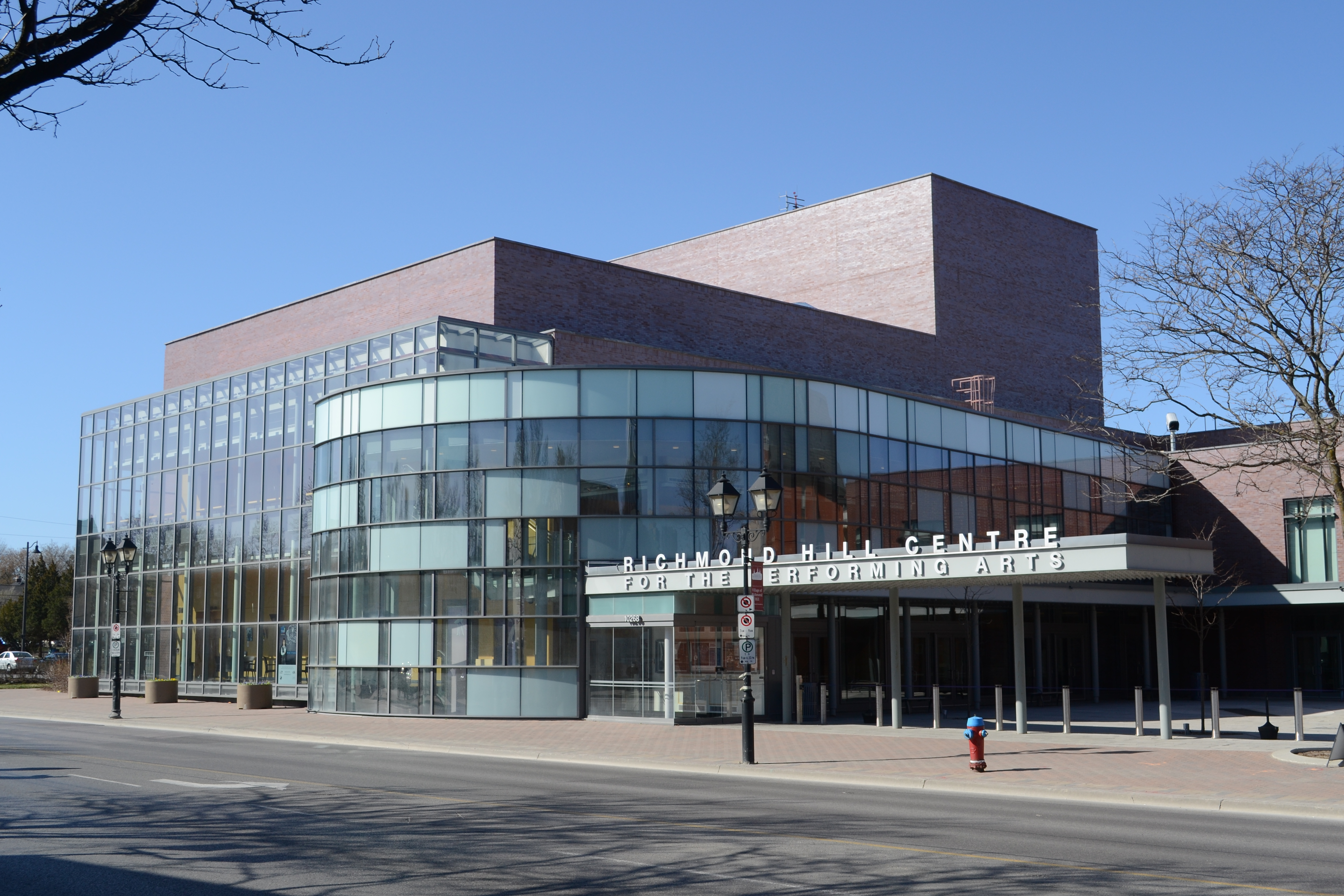

General information
- Location: 10268 Yonge Street; Richmond Hill, Ontario; L4C 3B7
- Construction started: October 5, 2006
- Inaugurated: February 28, 2009

Design and construction
- Architect: Jack Diamond

The Richmond Hill Centre for the Performing Arts is a 43,000-square-foot (4,000 m^{2}) multi-use cultural facility in Richmond Hill, Ontario, Canada.

== History ==
The Town of Richmond Hill Council approved the site of the Richmond Hill Centre for Performing Arts at the former site of the old Town Hall in September 2003. The centre was designed by Jack Diamond and his firm Diamond and Schmitt Architects . The 30 million dollar construction project was the largest ever undertaken by the town. The centre integrated the fully restored Richmond Hill High School (circa 1897), which houses the Centre's administrative offices and a commercial space (Covernotes Tea and Coffee House).

== Location and description ==
The centre is located on 1.5 acres (6,100 m^{2}) of land directly on Yonge Street in Richmond Hill's downtown core, at the corner of Yonge and Wright Streets.

The centre includes:

- Main Auditorium, seating 631 guests, the largest seating capacity of any theatre in York Region.
- The 150-seat Rehearsal Hall with a flexible configuration for interactive presentations, dinner theatre, award ceremonies and corporate events.
- Lobby Galleries where an array of visual arts are displayed.
- Outdoor Piazza for exhibitions of large-scale art and for productions and presentations in the open air (alfresco).
- Multi-purpose rooms for meetings, classrooms etc.
- Restored Heritage Building which houses the Centre’s administrative offices on the second floor while future commercial and/or retail spaces are being considered for the ground level.

In addition, the theatre is the largest of its kind in York Region with a full hydraulic orchestra pit.

== Educational series ==
The theatre offers an annual educational series featuring productions (theatre, dance, and music) and workshops for young people.
