= Aubrey Dan =

Canadian businessman and philanthropist

Aubrey Dan CM (born October 4, 1963) is a Canadian businessman and philanthropist as well as a producer and impresario. He is the son of Leslie Dan, a Canadian entrepreneur and founder of the generic pharmaceutical manufacturer Novopharm. He graduated from the University of Western Ontario and received a Bachelor of Administrative and Commercial Studies in 1985. The department was later renamed after Aubrey Dan in 2006, and is now called the DAN Department of Management & Organizational Studies.

== Business ventures ==
According to the Dancap website, Dan founded a number of companies under the Dancap moniker including: Dancap Private Equity, Dancap Global Asset Management, Dancap Productions and Dancap Catering.

== Philanthropy ==
As a philanthropist, Dan has donated millions to various charitable organizations including: $5 million to the Baycrest Centre Foundation; $8 million to the Sunnybrook Foundation's Centre for High Risk Mothers & Babies; and $350,000 to Ontario Wound Care Inc. for the hyperbaric oxygen treatment of diabetic wounds.

On April 7, 2016, the School of Drama and Music at Queen's University was renamed the DAN School of Drama and Music in recognition of a $5-million donation from Dan, whose daughter is a graduate of the school's Drama program.

== Awards and recognition ==
Additional accolades for Dan include an honorary Doctorate of Laws Degree from Assumption University in 2008 and Member of the Order of Canada in 2019.
