= Reina Bendayan =

Canadian researcher and professor

Academic background
- Education: BSc, Université de Montréal; PharmD, University of Florida

Academic work
- Institutions: Leslie Dan Faculty of Pharmacy

Reina Bendayan is a Canadian pharmacologist. She is a professor in the Department of Pharmaceutical Sciences in the Leslie Dan Faculty of Pharmacy at the University of Toronto and Career Scientist at the Ontario HIV Treatment Network.

== Early life and education ==
Bendayan earned her Bachelor of Science degree in Pharmacy at the University of Montreal before obtaining her Doctor of Pharmacy at the University of Florida and completing a three-year Medical Research Council Post-Doctoral Fellowship at the University of Toronto (U of T).

== Career ==
Following her PhD and fellowship, Bendayan accepted a faculty position in the Leslie Dan Faculty of Pharmacy at U of T as a Graduate Coordinator. During this time, she received funding for her project "Transport of Antiretroviral Drugs in the Human Brain." Upon stepping down as Graduate Coordinator, Bendayan became the chair and Associate Dean Graduate Education of the Graduate Department of Pharmaceutical Sciences at U of T. In this role, Bendayan focused her research on the field of anti-HIV drug distribution in several compartments of the brain. She was elected a Fellow of the American Association of Pharmaceutical Scientists after her research team became the first to demonstrate that "specific proteins localized in the brain can play a significant role in the permeability of these drugs at primary sites of infection in the Central Nervous System and contribute to antiviral drug resistance." She later received the 2013 AFPC Pfizer Research Career Award as a result of her accomplishments.

In March 2021, Bendayan received funding to examine whether compounds used to treat Type 2 diabetes were able to reverse HIV-associated brain inflammation and neurological disorders. Following this, she was elected a Fellow of the Canadian Academy of Health Sciences for being "a leading expert in research to study how drugs are regulated and transported across blood-tissue barriers, including the blood-brain barrier."
