= The Image Centre =

Art museum at Toronto Metropolitan University, Canada

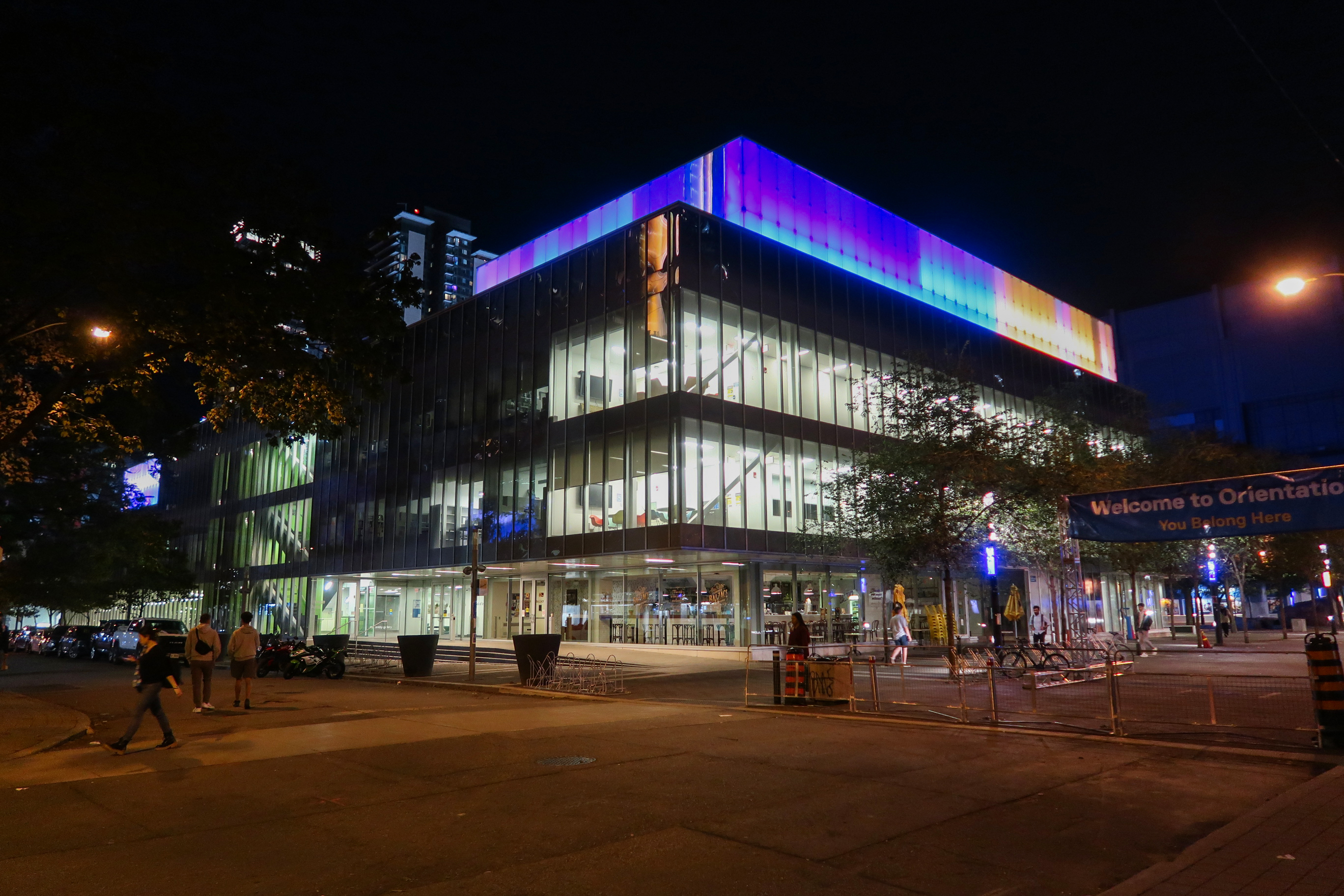

- Location of the gallery in Toronto
- Established: September 2012
- Location: 33 Gould Street; Toronto, Ontario, Canada
- Coordinates: 43°39′27″N 79°22′45″W
- Type: Photography, art museum and education centre
- Director: Paul Roth
- Curator: Gaëlle Morel
- Public transit access: TMU; 505
- Website: theimagecentre.ca

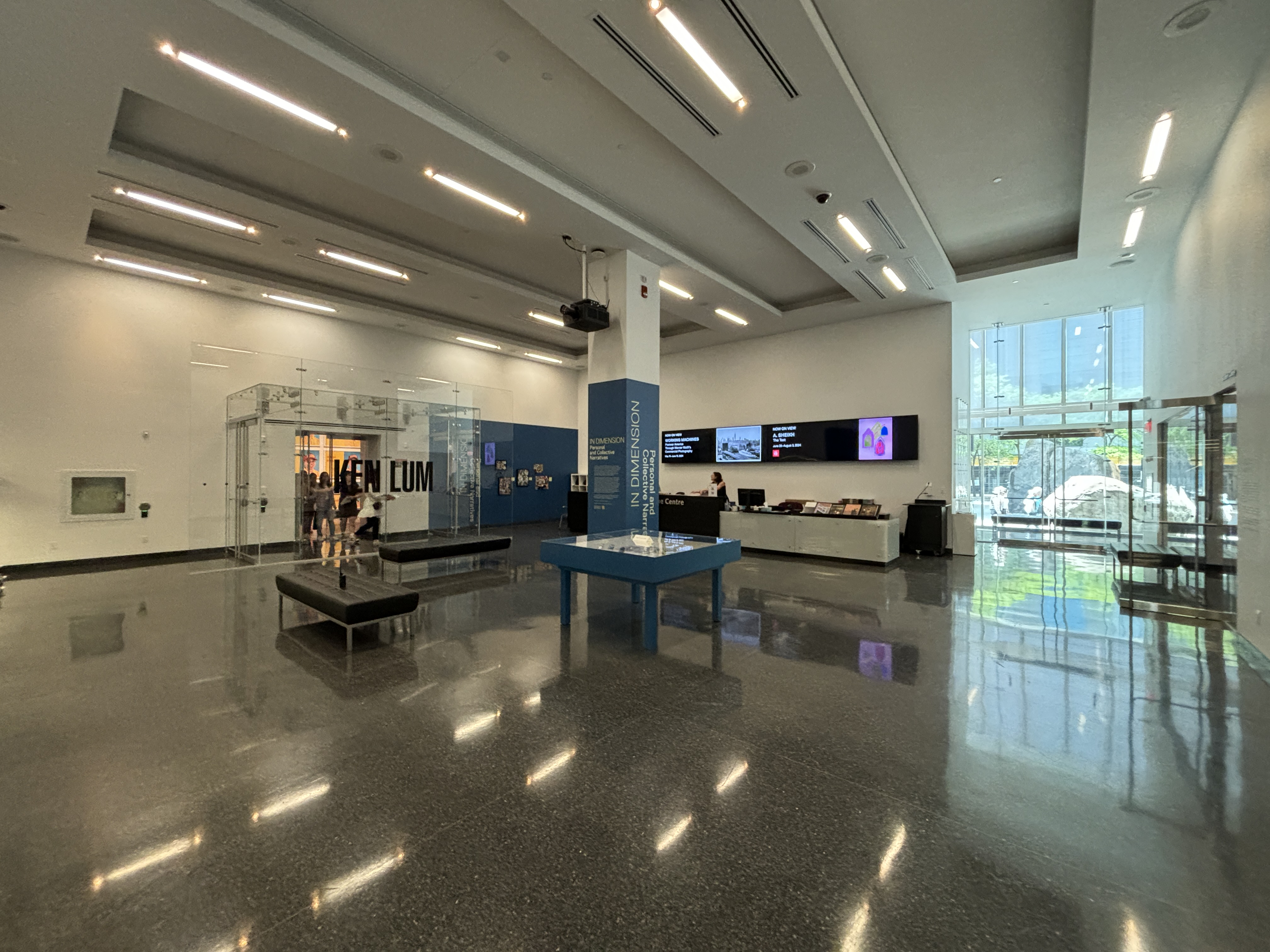
The Image Centre Lobby

The Image Centre (formerly known as the Ryerson Image Centre and the Ryerson Gallery and Research Centre) is a photography and art museum in Toronto, Ontario, Canada. The centre is a university museum operated by Toronto Metropolitan University (TMU), and is housed in a renovated and remodelled former warehouse building at Gould and Bond Streets on TMU's campus. The centre includes gallery, collections, teaching, research and exhibition spaces and shares the building with the School of Image Arts.

== History ==
Former logo for the centre, used until July 2022.

The gallery was officially opened on September 29, 2012.

The new building, designed by Toronto architect Donald Schmitt of Diamond and Schmitt Architects contains:

- Three public gallery spaces
- Glassed in entrance Colonnade that hosts the Salah J. Bachir New Media Wall
- A fully staffed professional research centre with museum-quality environmental controls
- A climate controlled vault to house the collections, including The Black Star Collection

The centre was in part created to display some of the 292,000 photos from Black Star which it had received as an anonymous donation.

In August 2013, Paul Roth, a former senior curator and director of photography at Corcoran Gallery of Art was appointed as new director of the Ryerson Image Centre. In March 2015, the museum has acquired the archive of Berenice Abbott, which included more than 6,000 photos and 7,000 negatives.

In July 2022, the centre renamed itself "the Image Centre". This followed the renaming of Ryerson University to Toronto Metropolitan University in April 2022, in response to concerns about Egerton Ryerson's influence on the Canadian Indian residential school system.
