= Ford Center for the Performing Arts =

Ford Center for the Performing Arts can refer to:

- Ford Center for the Performing Arts Oriental Theatre, now known as the James M. Nederlander Theatre, Chicago
- Ford Center for the Performing Arts, New York City, renamed the Hilton Theatre, then the Foxwoods Theatre, and now the Lyric Theatre
- Ford Centre for the Performing Arts, North York, Toronto, now the Toronto Centre for the Arts
- Gertrude C. Ford Center for the Performing Arts, University of Mississippi
