= Jack Diamond (architect) =

Canadian architect (1932–2022)

- Born: Abel Joseph Diamond; November 8, 1932; Piet Retief, South Africa
- Died: October 30, 2022 (aged 89); Toronto, Ontario, Canada
- Education: University of Cape Town; University College, Oxford; University of Pennsylvania
- Occupation: Architect
- Awards: Order of Canada; Order of Ontario

Abel Joseph "Jack" Diamond, OC OOnt (November 8, 1932 – October 30, 2022) was a South African-born Canadian architect. Diamond arrived in Canada in 1964 to teach at the University of Toronto. In 1974, he established his architectural practice, A.J. Diamond Architects. This practice evolved into Diamond Schmitt Architects.

== Personal life and education ==
Jack Diamond was born on November 8, 1932, in Piet Retief, South Africa, and he belongs to a Jewish family. Diamond's great-grandfather was a rabbi in London, England. In 1917, Diamond's grandfather died in a pogrom in Lithuania. Diamond's father, Jacob Diamond, migrated to South Africa before the Second World War.

Diamond's mother had kept a house plan that Diamond drew when he was four. His love of architecture began at a young age. To Diamond, buildings have been a unique way of playing house. Diamond has a passion for various forms of art; painting, sketching, and music.

Diamond had a love of watercolor paintings and sketches. His house was decorated with cities and landscapes paintings from throughout his career. His sketches are published in a book by Douglas & McIntyre, called Sketches: From Here and There. The book consists of many sketches that resemble his very own sketch book.

In 1956, Diamond received a Bachelor of Architecture from University of Cape Town. He subsequently studied philosophy, politics and economics at University College, Oxford, graduating in 1958. Diamond received his Masters of Architecture at University of Pennsylvania in 1962. It was at Oxford University where Diamond met his wife, Gillian. In Philadelphia, Diamond worked with the reputable architect, Louis Kahn. In 1964, Diamond moved to Canada and became the director of the Architecture Program at University of Toronto.

In 1995, Diamond was made an Officer of the Order of Canada, and he was awarded the Order of Ontario in 1997.

Diamond served as a member of the Ontario Human Rights Commission from 1986 to 1989, as chairman of the Design Advisory Committee for the National Capital, Ottawa, and as a commissioner of the Greater Toronto Area Task Force.

Diamond died at his Toronto home on October 30, 2022, at the age of 89.

== Career and design approach ==
Diamond began his career in architecture in 1968, shortly after he joined University of Toronto. He stayed with the University of Toronto until 1970.

In 1970, Diamond persuaded people in Toronto to consider heritage preservation of an old ceramics manufacturing plant. At the time, the idea of preserving an old warehouse was a bizarre concept. Diamond had borrowed money and renovated the building and lived in one of the floors. The project was successful and other individuals showed interest. The old warehouse went under renovation and was later sold to Ed Mirvish. Diamond is a known pioneer in Toronto's heritage restoration.

In 1975, Diamond established his practice A. J. Diamond Architects. In 1978, he formed a partnership with Donald Schmitt and Company and the practice evolved into Diamond and Schmitt Architects employing over 120 staff. Diamond Schmitt Architects have designed academic, cultural, commercial, healthcare, civic and residential buildings. Their approach to architecture revolves around human activity. They challenge design in hopes of creating spaces that create a better way of living by using creative design strategies.

== Notable projects ==
=== Four Seasons Centre for the Performing Arts ===
The Four Seasons Centre for the Performing Arts opened in 2006. It is home to the Canadian Opera Company and the National Ballet of Canada. The Performing Arts Centre design keeps the city noise of Toronto out.

=== United Kingdom Holocaust Memorial Competition ===
The United Kingdom Holocaust Memorial was an international design competition held in 2017. Diamond Schmitt's entry was among the finalists, although it was ultimately not selected. Located in Victoria Tower Gardens, the entrance of the Memorial is a ramp that circles around the middle. The cast-iron walls are a darker material, a reminder of the events that took place in the Holocaust. The sunken middle opens up to the sky to bring lightness into the memorial and contrast to the darker walls. The middle of the Memorial is the "Court of Conscience". The recitation of the names of the victims are the only sounds heard within the quiet memorial.

=== Mariinsky II ===
The Mariinsky II opened in 2013 in St. Petersburg, Russia. This theater was one of the first major Russia opera houses to be constructed in over a century. Acoustic quality and the experience of a performance were two main goals when designing the Mariinsky II. The main auditorium of the theater is clad in onyx. The warm glow from the onyx can be seen at street level outside. The warm glow is considered to be the artistic spirit from art institutions in Russia. The backstage is designed to allow for 5 stages to be worked on simultaneously, making it easier for crews working on productions. The theater is a symbolism of the power art has within Russia.

== Other projects ==
- 1975: Innis College, University of Toronto, Canada
- 1978: Citadel Theatre, Edmonton, Alberta, Canada
- 1981: Central YMCA Toronto
- 1981: Village Terraces, 260 Heath Street West, Toronto
- 1986: Arcadia Artists Co-Operative, Toronto
- 1986: Newcastle Town Hall
- 1988: Jerusalem City Hall, Israel
- 1988: York University Student Centre, Toronto, Ontario Canada
- 1989: Richmond Hill Library, Richmond Hill, Ontario Canada
- 1995: Baycrest Apotex Retirement Centre, Toronto, Ontario, Canada
- 2001: Jewish Community Center in Manhattan
- 2006: Four Seasons Centre for the Performing Arts, Toronto, Ontario Canada
- 2007: Harman Center for the Arts, Washington D.C., USA
- 2008: Southbrook Vineyards, Niagara-on-the-Lake, Ontario, Canada
- 2009: Women's College Hospital Master Plan, Toronto, Ontario Canada
- 2009: Richmond Hill Centre for the Performing Arts, Richmond Hill, Ontario, Canada
- 2010: Corus Quay Building, Toronto, Ontario Canada
- 2011: Montreal Symphony House, Montreal, Quebec, Canada (with SNC Lavalin and Aedifica, Montreal)
- 2011: Li Ka Shing Knowledge Institute, Toronto, Ontario Canada
- 2011: Burlington Performing Arts Centre, Burlington, Ontario, Canada
- 2012: Osgoode Hall Law School, Toronto, Ontario Canada
- 2013: Bridgepoint Health Chronic Long Term Health Care Complex, Toronto, Ontario Canada
- 2013: The Mariinsky Theatre (Second Stage) New Opera, St. Petersburg, Russia

== Work in progress ==
- Black Sea Residential Resorts, Obzor, Bulgaria (with Urbiarch, Obzor)

== Publications ==
- 1996: Works: The Architecture of A. J. Diamond, Donald Schmitt and Company, 1968–1994
- 2007: "Urban Form, Transportation and Sustainability". Ideas that Matter, July 30
- 2007: "Sprawl is our 'Inconvenient Truth'". The Globe and Mail, May 18
- 2008: Insight and On Site, The Architecture of Diamond and Schmitt.
- 2010: Sketches from Here and There
- 2022: Context and Content: Memoirs of a Fortunate Architect

== Honors and awards ==
- 1976: Governor General's Medal in Architecture for the Citadel Theater in Edmonton
- 1984: Governor General's Medal in Architecture for the Metropolitan Toronto Central YMCA
- 1989: Toronto Arts Award for Architecture and Design
- 1990: Governor General's Medal in Architecture for the Earth Sciences Centre at University of Toronto
- 1991: Governor General's Medal in Architecture for the York University Student Centre
- 1993: Governor General's Medal in Architecture for the Richmond Hill Central Library
- 1995: Doctor of Engineering (Honoris Causa), Dalhousie University
- 1995: Officer of the Order of Canada
- 1997: Order of Ontario
- 2001: Royal Architectural Institute of Canada Gold Medal
- 2001: Royal Architectural Institute of Canada Award of Excellence for Innovation in Architecture
- 2005: Royal Architectural Institute of Canada Award of Excellence for Innovation in Architecture
