= Tomasz Golka =

Polish-American conductor and composer (born 1975)

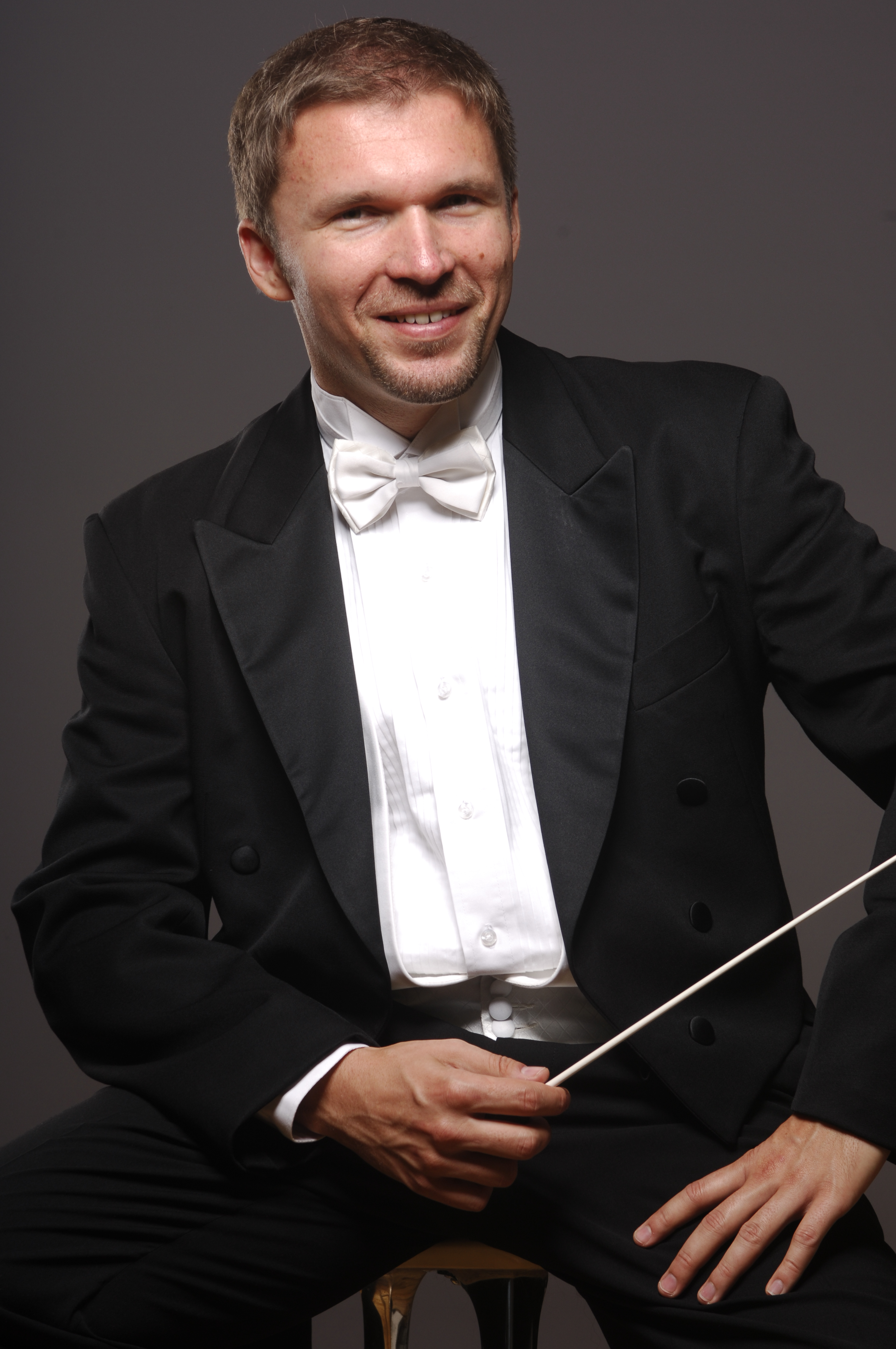
Tomasz Golka

Tomasz Golka (born 1975) is a Polish-American conductor, composer and violinist. Golka is the son of pianist Anna Karczewska-Golka and trombonist George Golka. He is the great-grandson of Max Stern. His younger brother Adam Golka is a pianist.

== Career ==
Golka was born in 1975 in Warsaw, in Poland. His family emigrated to Mexico when he was young. He completed bachelor's and master's degrees in violin at the Shepherd School of Music of Rice University in Houston, Texas, and became an American citizen in 1996. He studied conducting under David Effron at Indiana University and later under Markand Thakar and Gustav Meier at the Peabody Conservatory of Music of Johns Hopkins University.

In 2003, Golka won first prize at the Eduardo Mata International Conducting Competition in Mexico City.

From 2003-04, Golka was a visiting professor at Ball State University in Muncie, Indiana and served as a conductor for the Ball State Symphony Orchestra.

In 2006, Golka was a conducting fellow at the Tanglewood Music Festival. His work at Tanglewood included conducting a performance of Stravinsky's The Soldier's Tale with composers Elliott Carter, Milton Babbitt, and John Harbison as narrators.

From 2007 to 2012, Golka was music director of the Lubbock Symphony Orchestra.

From 2008 to 2010, Golka was music director of the Williamsport Symphony Orchestra. In 2010, Golka became music director of the Riverside Philharmonic. From 2014 to 2015, he was Chief Conductor of the Orquesta Sinfónica Nacional de Colombia in Bogotá. With the Orquesta Sinfónica Nacional de Colombia, he gave several world premieres, including the Colombian premiere of Thomas Adès's Asyla.

Golka received a certificate in film scoring from UCLA Extension, where he was the recipient of the BMI/Jerry Goldsmith Scholarship.

On 1 September 2014, Golka married Anna Kostyuchek, associate concertmaster of the Riverside Philharmonic. The couple reside in Los Angeles, California.

== List of Works ==
- Celsius 233 for orchestra (2010)
- Valhalla Fanfare for brass and percussion (2010)
- Orchestration of J.S. Bach's Passacaglia and Fugue in c minor, BWV 582 (2012)
- The Transit of Venus for violin and orchestra (2013)
- Festivus, Festivus for voice and orchestra or voice and piano (2015)
- Ukrainian Christmas Overture for orchestra (2016)
- Variation on "The Battle Cry of Freedom" for orchestra (2017)
- An Animated Adventure for orchestra (2018)
- Garryowen Variations for orchestra (2018)
- True Green for any instrument and piano (2018) or for 13 instruments (2020)
- Felix in Hollywood, a symphonic score to accompany the 1923 cartoon (2019)
- Afikoman for clarinet and piano (2021)
- The Grief of Ave Maria for violin and piano (2023)

== Discography ==
- Villa-Lobos, Heitor: Ciranda das sete notas. Ezequiel Fainguersch, bassoon / Bloomington Chamber Orchestra. Melo Records, 2004.
- Stravinsky, Igor: L'Histoire du soldat. Elliott Carter (The Soldier) / Milton Babbitt (The Devil) / John Harbison (Narrator), Fellows of the Tanglewood Music Center. Tanglewood Audio Archives, 2006.
