= Leslie Dan Faculty of Pharmacy =

Pharmacy school of the University of Toronto

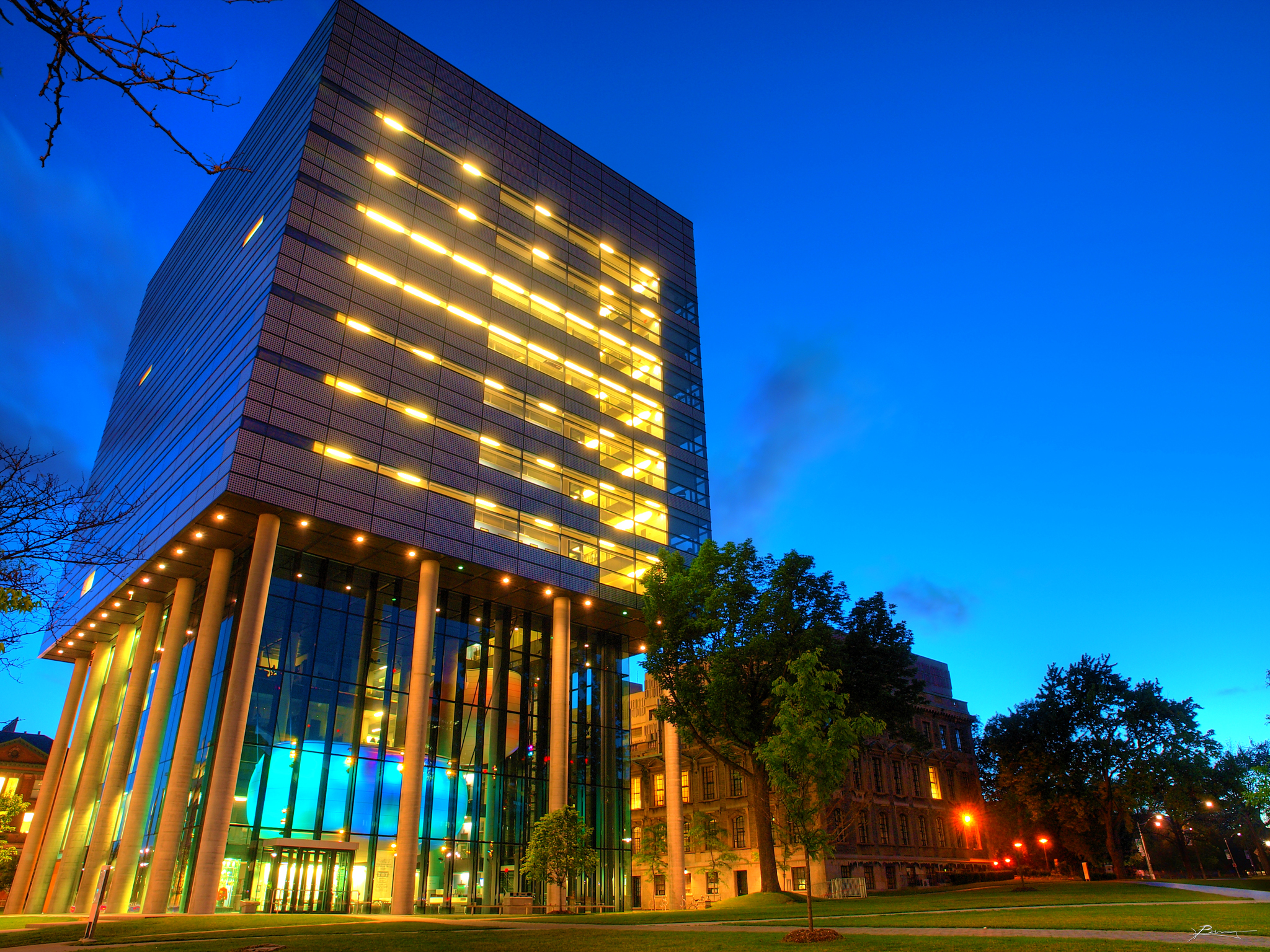
- Evening view of the Leslie L. Dan Pharmacy Building's southeastern corner
- Motto: Trutina penso doctrinae (Latin)
- Motto in English: "I weigh by the balance of learning"
- Type: Public pharmacy school
- Established: 1882; 144 years ago
- Parent institution: University of Toronto
- Dean: Lisa Dolovich
- Total staff: 180
- Undergraduates: 1,000
- Postgraduates: 140
- Location: 144 College Street, Toronto, Ontario, Canada; 43°39′36″N 79°23′30″W
- Named for: Leslie Dan
- Website: pharmacy.utoronto.ca

The Leslie Dan Faculty of Pharmacy is the pharmacy school and an academic division of the University of Toronto. The school is based on the St. George campus at the northwestern corner of College Street and University Avenue, placing it across from the Ontario Legislative Building and at the entrance to Queen's Park station. It is also situated near four internationally renowned hospitals in the Toronto Academic Health Science Network—The Hospital for Sick Children, Princess Margaret Cancer Centre, Toronto General Hospital and Mount Sinai Hospital. It is part of Toronto's Discovery District.

== History ==
The Faculty of Pharmacy at the University of Toronto began in 1953, when the Ontario College of Pharmacy (now Pharmacists) who first operated at the school had merged into the school curriculum. By 1868, the pharmacy program consisted of only a few evenings of voluntary classes, with no practically prerequisite classes. However, the long, traditional apprenticeship of this professional field had pressed a strong emphasis onto the students. Today, the program has evolved into "a compulsory, four-year second-entry scientific and professional university course with a supervised period of professional practice." The organisation of this program has become significantly more structured. This change in focus strayed away from the predominant emphasis of the practice of training through an apprenticeship to today's emphasis of a theoretical study and application of those skills in real-life situations. Students are better equipped with the skills which are required to meet the present needs of the profession. The University of Toronto was the only school in Ontario to offer a pharmacy education until the opening of the University of Waterloo School of Pharmacy in 2008.

In 1877, the Faculty moved into the University of Toronto's St. George campus, and new levels of pharmaceutical education was offered as a PhD degree at the University of Toronto was being arranged. As the demands for more pharmacists increased, the demands of professional education in this particular field increased as well. As a result, in 1992, the faculty introduced the PharmD (Doctor of Pharmacy) in hopes to accommodate for the growing need for graduates in the field. Within the past decade, enrolment in the undergraduate and graduate programs and doubled and tripled in size respectively. The Faculty had no choice but to expand their facilities, thus moving to their current location at 144 College Street in 2006 (also site of the Faculty of Botany greenhouses which were later demolished except the oldest (c. 1932) relocated to Allan Gardens in 2002-2003) in 2006. The Faculty of Pharmacy of the University of Toronto's Arms and Badge were registered with the Canadian Heraldic Authority on 17 May 2001. The Latin motto is "Trutina Penso Doctrinae" which means "I weigh by the balance of learning."

As the only faculty of pharmacy in Ontario until 2007, the Faculty needed to expand beyond 120 students per year, but could not do so in its limited space. The largest room in the former Pharmacy Building (the F. Norman Hughes building, now the Anthropology Building, located at Huron St. and Russell St.) held only 30 students, and each year (at the time of the proposal) had 120 students. None of the pharmacy classes could be held within the main building, which posed a problem for the faculty. As well, the various pharmacy research labs were interspersed throughout the St. George campus.

Construction of a new building enabled the pharmacy program to gradually increase its student intake to 240 new students per year in September 2006, doubling its previous capacity; between 2000 and 2008, the total enrolment in the pharmacy program (all 4 years) increased from 499 to 1,011 students. Other programs administrated by the Faculty, including the graduate-level advanced Pharm.D. program (not to be confused with an entry-level Pharm.D.), the Bachelor of Science specialisation in pharmaceutical chemistry, the MSc and PhD programs in pharmaceutical sciences and the International Pharmacy Graduates bridging programme also experienced significant growth. On 19 April 2011, the Faculty announced a $1 million donation from Walmart Canada to create the Walmart Canada International Pharmacy Education Centre. This centre will feature enhanced facilities including a one hundred seat classroom, and will allow increased enrolment into the program.

The $75-million (CAD) building was funded by numerous alumni and organisations, along with the Government of Ontario's SuperBuild fund. The building was named the Leslie L. Dan Pharmacy Building in 2001 in honour of the generous donation made by Leslie Dan, an alumnus of the school and a noted pharmacist, philanthropist, entrepreneur and Member of the Order of Canada, as well as founder of the generic drug manufacturer Novopharm and the Canadian Medical Aid Programme. Dan donated $8 million earmarked specifically for the building in 2000, at which point the building was named for him; this was followed up with a $7 million donation to his alma mater in 2002, resulting in the Faculty of Pharmacy being renamed to the Leslie Dan Faculty of Pharmacy.

=== COVID-19 pandemic ===
During the COVID-19 pandemic, the Leslie Dan Faculty of Pharmacy received a $554,792 grant from the Public Health Agency of Canada's Immunization Partnership Fund to reduce adult vaccine hesitancy through the CARD (Comfort, Ask, Relax and Distract) system previously developed for children. This strategy was implemented to increase uptake of COVID-19 vaccines.

== Leslie L. Dan Pharmacy Building ==
The faculty is based in the Leslie L. Dan Pharmacy Building on the St. George campus, noted for its two orb-shaped classrooms referred to as the "pods", which are suspended lecture halls. The pods are lit at night with coloured stage lights visible from afar, giving the building a "Star Trek feel" and likened to giant glowing pills. The Pharmacy Building has received international coverage and awards, in part because of its design team, including Sir Norman Foster and Claude Engle, as well as its sponsor Leslie Dan. It was also featured on the cover of, as well as profiled in, the book Detail in Process.

== Academics and curricula ==
The Leslie Dan Faculty of Pharmacy offers the following degrees:

- Master of Science in Pharmacy (MScPhm)
- Doctor of Pharmacy (PharmD)
- Doctor of Philosophy in Pharmaceutical Sciences (PhD)
- Master of Science in Pharmaceutical Sciences (MSc)
- Bachelor of Science in Pharmaceutical Sciences (BSc)

The current entry-to-practice PharmD program graduated its first class in 2015, coinciding with the graduation of the last class of traditional post-graduate PharmD students. This change mirrors that of the pharmacy curriculum in the United States: introducing advanced pharmacy practice experiences, increasing program admission requirements, thereby reducing and streamlining the didactic portions of the curriculum. Practicing pharmacists holding BScPhm may choose to elect to bridge to the current PharmD degree via the PharmD for Pharmacists program. Graduates from this program hold both the traditional BScPhm and current PharmD degrees. Since the traditional post-graduate PharmD program is also no longer available, a new post-graduate degree in the form of MScPhm was established to further the clinical and research skills of practicing pharmacists.

In addition, the Faculty offers a non-professional undergraduate Bachelor of Science in Pharmaceutical Science program along with graduate research programs that lead to Master of Science and Doctor of Philosophy (MSc and PhD) degrees in pharmaceutical science.

=== Reputation ===
Quacquarelli Symonds ranked the University of Toronto 12th in the world and first in Canada for pharmacy a pharmacology in its QS World University Rankings by Subject 2025.

== See also ==
- List of pharmacy schools
- Dalla Lana School of Public Health
- Lawrence Bloomberg Faculty of Nursing
- University of Toronto Faculty of Medicine
