= Leslie Dan =

Canadian businessman (born 1929)

Leslie Lewis Dan
- Born: November 26, 1929 (age 96); Budapest, Hungary
- Education: Leslie Dan Faculty of Pharmacy
- Known for: Founder of Novopharm
- Children: Michael D. Dan, Aubrey Dan, and Andrea Dan-Hytman
- Awards: Order of Canada; Order of Ontario

Leslie Lewis Dan, CM OOnt (born November 26, 1929) is a Canadian-Hungarian businessman and pharmacist. The founder of Novopharm, a successful generic pharmaceutical company which he subsequently sold to Teva Pharmaceuticals. A noted philanthropist, Dan has been awarded the prestigious Order of Canada and the Order of Ontario for his charitable efforts.

== Early life ==
Born in Budapest, Dan moved to Canada in 1947. As a teenage Jew, he survived the Holocaust by using false identity papers. He moved to Canada in 1947 and graduated from the University of Toronto School of Pharmacy in 1954 obtaining a Bachelor of Science degree. He completed his Master of Business Administration degree in 1959. In 1960, he founded a company which distributed over-the-counter drugs.

== Business ventures ==
In 1965, he founded Novopharm. In 2000, when he sold the company to Teva Pharmaceuticals of Israel for an estimated $430 million, it had sales of $750 million and employed 3,000 people. He then started a new company, Viventia (formerly Novopharm Biotech), which specializes in the discovery and development of products for the treatment of cancer. He is currently the chairman.

As of April 2021, he has an estimated net worth of $1.04 billion Canadian dollars (approximately $830 million USD), making him the 91st richest person in Canada.

== Philanthropy ==
Dan is well known as a philanthropist. His perspective on helping others is formed out of faith in truths from the Jewish Torah and Talmud. From the latter, Dan has noted writings in the Bava Bathra chapters, including: "Charity is equal in importance to all other commandments combined." And, "Who gives charity in secret is greater than Moses."

His donations include:

- He donated $15 million to the University of Toronto to fund the Leslie L. Dan Pharmacy Building and the Leslie Dan Faculty of Pharmacy
- He founded the Canadian Medicine Aid Programme (CAN-MAP) in 1985. This organization provides life-saving medicines and other aid to the sick in the Third World
- He has donated to Yad Vashem

== Honours ==
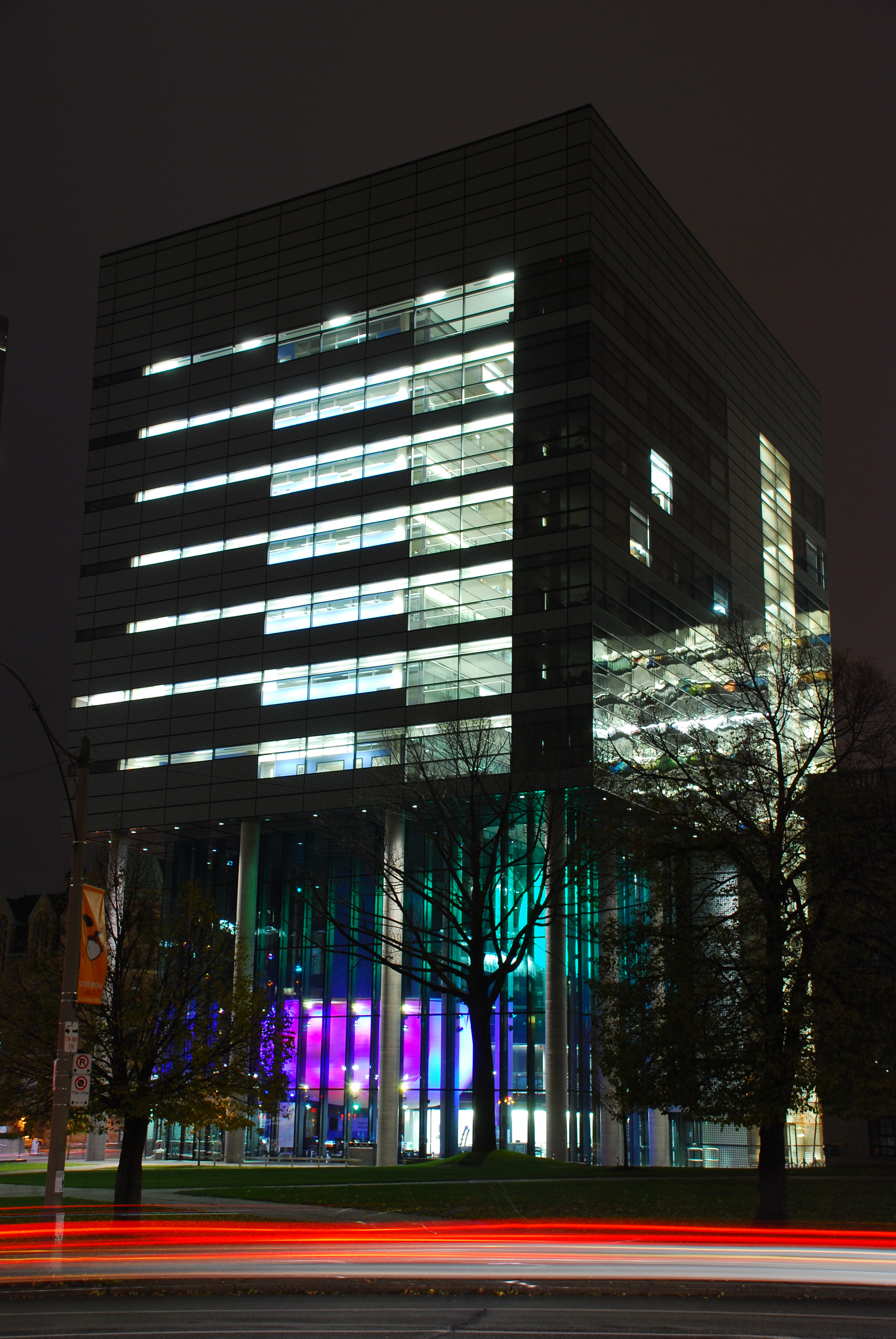
University of Toronto Leslie L. Dan Pharmacy Building

His honours include:

- Canadian Society for Pharmaceutical Sciences (CSPS) Leadership Award in 2012
- The University of Toronto Leslie L. Dan Pharmacy Building, designed by Sir Norman Foster and completed in 2006, is named in his honour.
- In 1996, he was made a Member of the Order of Canada and awarded the Order of Ontario.
- He received an honorary Doctorate of Laws Degree from Dalhousie University in 1996 and the University of British Columbia in 1995.
- In 1997, he received the Distinguished Business Alumnus Award by the University of Toronto Joseph L. Rotman Faculty of Management.
- Aish HaTorah's Dan Family Building is named in his honour.

== Family ==
Dan married Judith in 1958. She died in 1995. They had three children, Dr. Michael D. Dan, Aubrey Dan, and Andrea Dan-Hytman. He married Anna in 1996. They share no children. Aubrey Dan is president of Dancap Private Equity and Andrea Dan-Hytman is co-owner of Viventia Biotech Inc.

== See also ==
- Canadians of Hungarian ancestry
