= Mariinsky Theatre Second Stage =

Stage at a theatre complex

Coordinates: 59.9250°N 30.2958°E

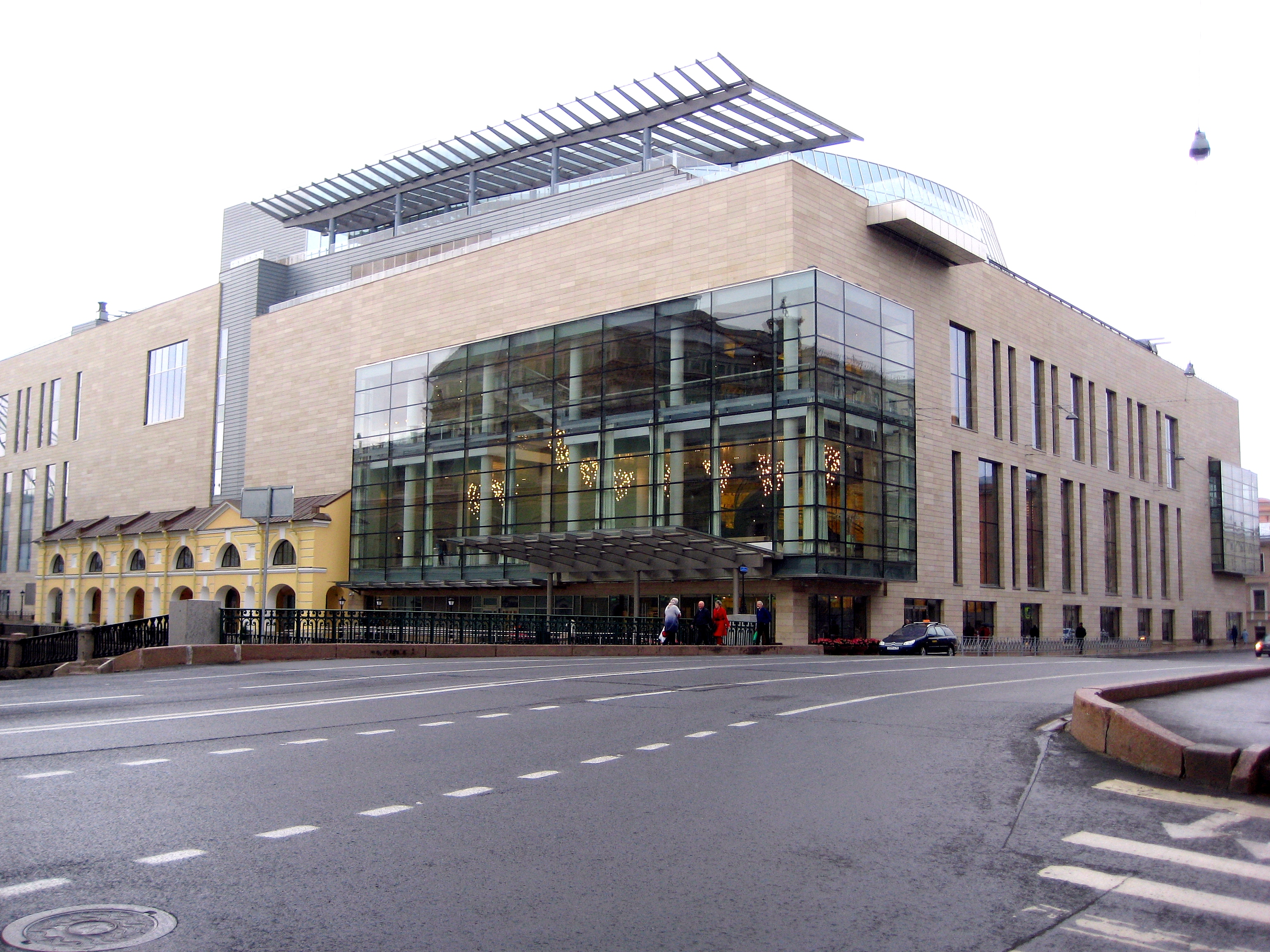
Mariinsky Theatre Second Stage Entrance.

The Mariinsky Theater Second Stage is the second part of a theatre complex which is made up of the original 1860 Mariinsky Theatre and the 2007 Mariinsky Theatre Concert Hall. The Second Stage has been completed and a gala concert celebrating the opening, and featuring performers Plácido Domingo, Rene Pape and Anna Netrebko, was presented on 2 May 2013. The concert also celebrated the sixtieth birthday of musical director Valery Gergiev.

The post-modernist French architect Dominique Perrault won a much-publicised contest for his design for a new home for the theatre, which is to be located adjacent to the current building. At the same time, the historic original structure had been due to undergo a complete renovation and this was planned to begin in the Autumn 2006.

After seeing projected costs rise to $244 million (U.S.) from $100 million, the Russian government announced in November 2008 that it was killing the Perrault plan. The Russian Prime Minister Vladimir Putin overruled both Valery Gergiev (the artistic director of the Mariinsky Theatre) and the Minister for Culture, announcing in early June 2009 that there would be a new competition to solicit proposals. A total of 15 proposals were received, a list which was then shortened to five. "We wanted to give the impression that although we were in a tense situation and we didn't want to delay forever ... no one felt like it was the best way to simply sit down quietly and say, 'You are a great architect; just come and do it,'" Mr. Gergiev explained.

With a budget of €295-million (about US $452-million), all of which will be paid by the Russian government with a completion date of no later than December 2011, the Canadian firm, Diamond and Schmitt Architects, prevailed over four other finalists, one of which came from Germany and three from Russia. The building has been hyped as "Russia's most important building project in 70 years". As noted by Mr. Diamond, (it is) "the first major opera house to be built in Russia since the Czars."

== Building construction history ==
At the end of the design competition for The Second Stage of the Mariinsky Theater in 2003, 11 proposals had been received. The winner was well-known French architect Dominique Perrault with «a gold cocoon» (an external cover of a building of the wrong form from glass and aluminium).

By 2005 experts discovered that detailed proposals presented by the competition winner did not meet Russian building codes. They failed to include sections relating to water supply, drainage, and ventilation. The result was that in 2007, FGU ("Northwest management on building, reconstruction and restorations") terminated the contract with the French architectural firm.

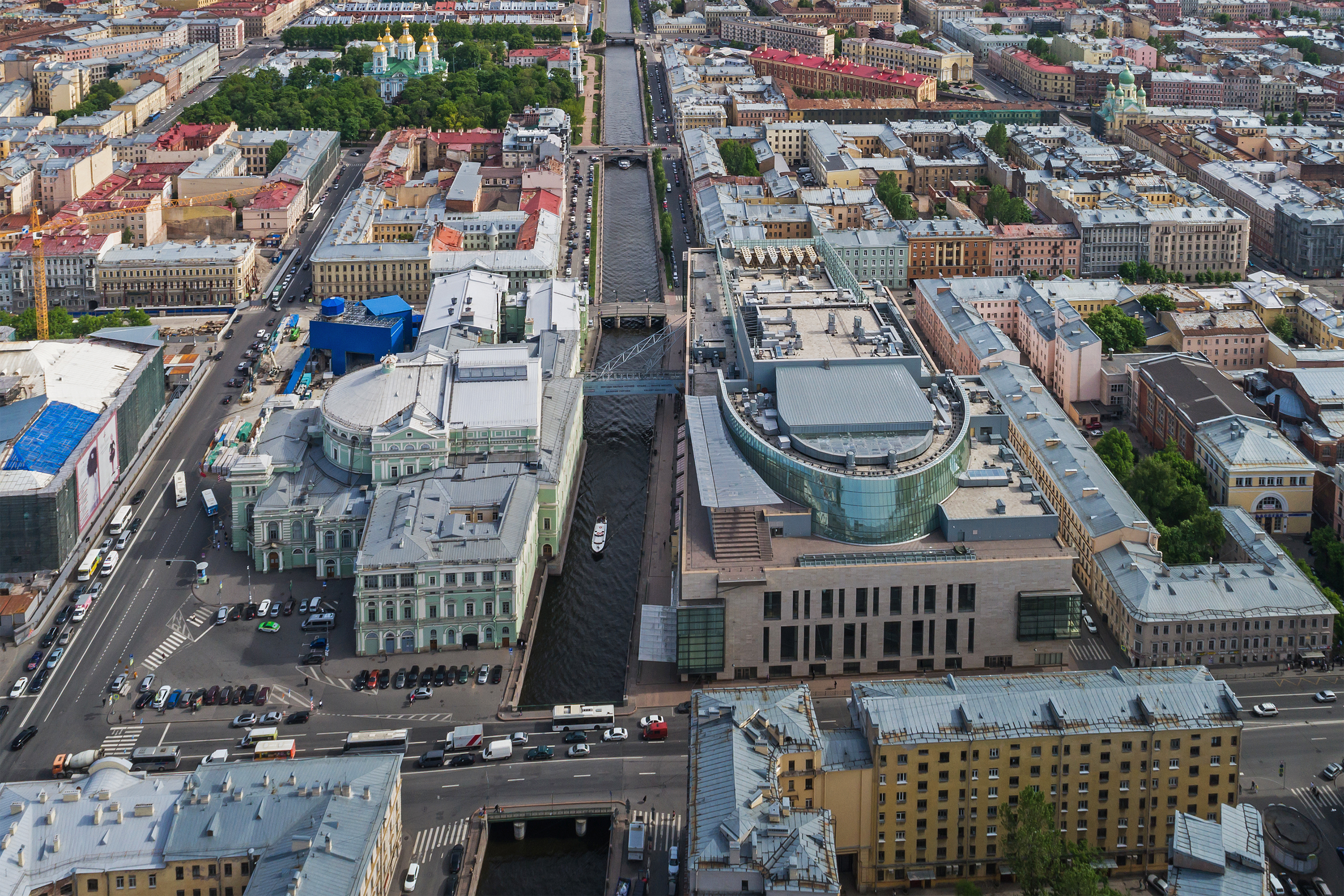
Aerial view: old building of the Mariinsky Theater at the left, the Second stage at the right

However, in June of that year the new general contractor, "Joint-Stock Company "NPO" Georeconstruction-fundamentproekt", in a short space of time removed all 286 obstacles shown on the working drawings of Perrault. As had become clear, the winning design was far from that presented when it won the international competition. In particular, it was necessary to make changes – based on the Saint Petersburg climate – in order to strengthen load-bearing structures above which the gold cupola would be located. As a result, the building would not look so open to the air. By July, the project had been simplified as much as possible, and it was determined that it would "not intrude so much into the existing city environment", Gergiev said. The height of the building was reduced and other elements were also reconsidered.

In 2008 the foundation work for the building of the theatre continued, but by April, it was found that the consistency of the soil under the construction area was unpredictable. (Later builders have compared the properties of the soil to those of sour cream). In order to overcome these problems, the builders strengthened the consistency of the soil to a depth of 12 to 14 metres and, as a result, cost estimates had to be increased. Moreover, the builders informed the authorities that the construction of a glass dome, as planned by Dominique Perrault's architectural firm, was impossible. Therefore that part of the project would have to be changed.

By June, the project had a new local architect partner, KB ViPS Architects, a firm working on high-rise and underground construction, and it became the third firm to work on the building.

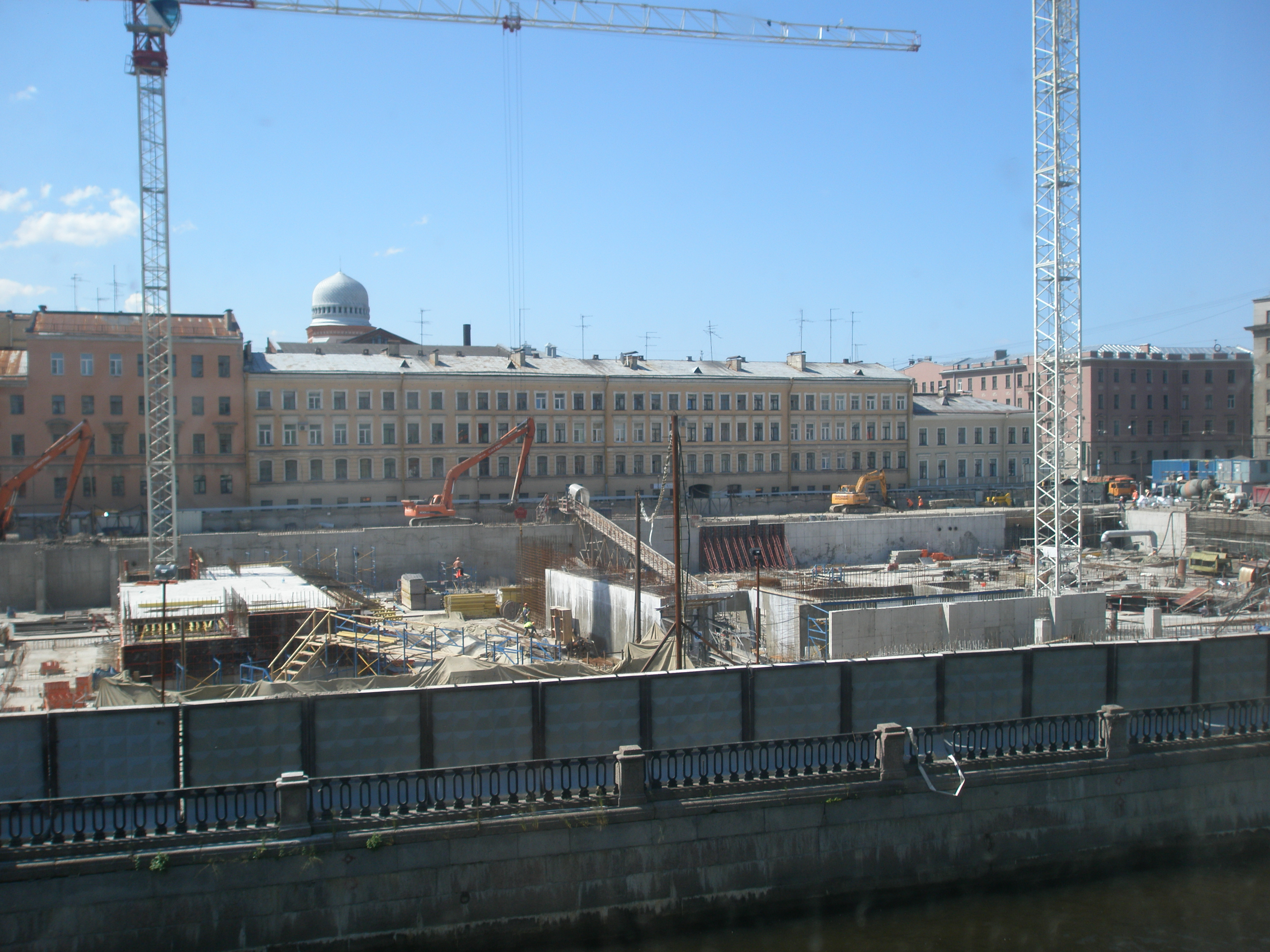
Construction progress as of June 2009

During 2009 foundation work was completed. Valery Gutovsky, a specialist in high-rise and underground construction, became the new head of construction for the project., and on 29 May Vladimir Putin held a meeting at which he confirmed that the building would be completed in 2011 at the cost estimated in the published budget.

On 28 July, the result of the last competition was announced, the winner being KB ViPS Architects, a specialist in high-rise and underground construction. Within a month, a contract was signed with that company and construction proceeded, with some parts of the building then reaching a height 5 metres. At the same time, according to Valery Gutovsky, the project was to be submitted to the town-planning council of St. Petersburg in October 2009 and to Glavgosekspertiza ("The General State Expert Review Department of the State Committee for Construction, Housing and Utilities" which was authorized to perform the state expert review of all projects by spring 2010. The construction cost was estimated at 8.5 billion roubles.

== Architecture and interior ==
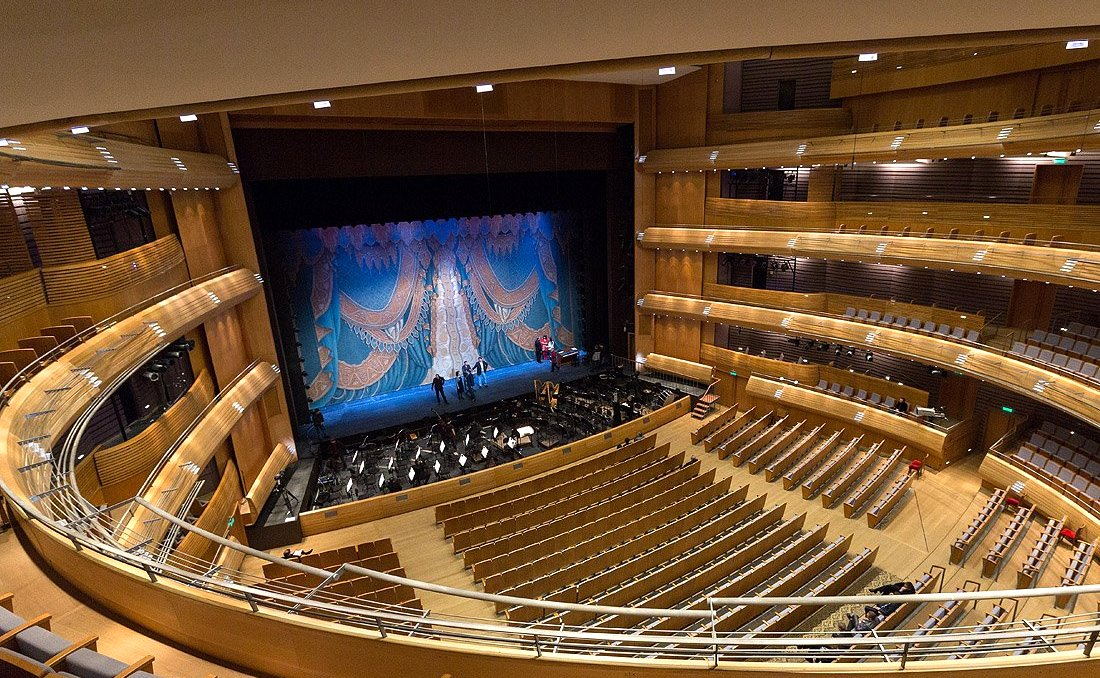
The Auditorium

The theater has been described as too modern and not modern enough, too ambitious and too restrained. The theater was built on a surface of 567,700 square foot, has 1,830 seats and facilities for 2,500 staff members. The last architect Diamond Schmitt Architects finished the design by creating an onyx wall which is visible from outside and illuminated. The lobby has a modern style with several straight and spiral staircases with glass balustrades. For the glass stairs and balustrades Diamond Schmitt Architects co-operated with Malishev Engineers, who were instrumental in designing Award Winning structures, most notably 36m long structural glass stair (first use of structural glass in public building in Russia) and large 100t spiral staircase which is hung from the ceiling.
