= Donald Schmitt =

Canadian architect (born 1951)

- Born: 1951 (age 74–75); South Porcupine, Ontario
- Education: University of Toronto Faculty of Architecture
- Occupation: Architect
- Practice: A.J Diamond; Diamond Schmitt Architects Incorporated

Donald Schmitt (born 1951) is a Canadian architect.

Born in 1951 in South Porcupine, a mining town in northern Ontario, he went to high school at the University of Toronto Schools (UTS) and studied afterwards at the University of Toronto Faculty of Architecture.

Donald Schmitt has practiced architecture with A.J Diamond since 1978 and is a Principal in the firm currently known as Diamond Schmitt Architects Incorporated.

He is the Founding Chair of the Public Art Commission for the City of Toronto for which he was awarded the Civic Medal and is currently a member of the University of Toronto Design Review Panel. He served on the Design Review Panel of the National Capital Commission for over a decade and for many years for Waterfront Toronto.

== Buildings of note ==
- 1983: Metro Toronto YMCA, Toronto, Ontario, Canada
- 2002: Bahen Centre for Information Technology, University of Toronto, Toronto, Ontario, Canada
- 2002: University of Ontario Institute of Technology Master Plan
- 2003: Max M. Fisher Music Center, Detroit, Michigan, USA
- 2004: Pierre Berton Resource Library, Vaughan, Ontario, Canada
- 2005: University of Guelph-Humber Academic Building, Toronto, Ontario, Canada
- 2008: Cambridge City Hall, Cambridge, Ontario, Canada
- 2010: Evergreen Brick Works Centre for Sustainability, Toronto, Ontario, Canada
- 2012: Daniels Spectrum, Toronto, Ontario, Canada
- 2013: Peter Gilgan Centre for Research and Learning at the Hospital for Sick Children, Toronto, Ontario, Canada
- 2017: Emily Carr University of Art+Design, Vancouver, British Columbia, Canada
- 2017: National Arts Centre Rejuvenation, Ottawa, Ontario, Canada
- 2017: The Globe and Mail Centre, Toronto, Ontario
- 2019: The Senate of Canada Building, Ottawa, Ontario, Canada
- 2021: The Drake Hotel's new Modern Wing, Toronto, Ontario, Canada
- 2022: David Geffen Hall, New York, New York, USA

== Work in Progress ==
- Ādisōke, Ottawa Public Library - Library and Archives Canada joint facility, Ottawa, Ontario
- Dani Reiss Modern and Contemporary Gallery at the Art Gallery of Ontario, Toronto, Ontario
- Clinical Support and Research Centre at St. Paul's Hospital, Vancouver, British Columbia
- New Brunswick Museum, Saint John, New Brunswick
- Park Road, Toronto, Ontario
- Temerty Faculty of Medicine's new James and Louise Temerty Building at the University of Toronto, Toronto, Ontario

== Publications ==
1996: Works: The Architecture of A.J. Diamond, Donald Schmitt and Company, 1968-1995

2008: Insight and On Site, The Architecture of Diamond and Schmitt

2024: Set Pieces: Architecture for the Performing Arts in Fifteen Fragments

== Awards ==
- 2019 Order of Canada
