= Dancap Productions =

Canadian theatre production company

- Founded: 2007
- Founder: Aubrey Dan
- Dissolved: 2012
- Type: Theatrical productions
- Location: Toronto, Ontario

Dancap Productions was a Canadian theatrical production company, based in Toronto, Ontario, Canada. Founded in 2007 by Aubrey Dan, the company presented large-scale musicals and plays in Toronto. The company initially found success with its Canadian production of Jersey Boys, which ran in Toronto for two years. After six years, Dancap Productions closed in July 2012.

== History ==
=== Formation ===
In 2004, Aubrey Dan was approached by the non-profit Canadian Stage Company to consider a sponsorship deal for some of the productions they were presenting in Toronto. Dan's interest in live theatre led to him (through his Dancap Private Equity company) partnering with the Canadian Stage Company to present three shows in Toronto between 2004 and 2006. This included the Canadian premiere of Urinetown at the Bluma Appel Theatre, between May 19 and July 11 2004. Ain't Misbehavin' played at the Bluma Appel Theatre between April 14 and June 25, 2005. In 2006, Hair was presented at the Bluma Appel Theatre between March 30 and June 17, 2006.

Following these experiences, Dan exited his partnership with the Canadian Stage Company and established his own theatrical production company, Dancap Productions. He sought to present more Broadway quality shows in Toronto, and envisioned Dancap Productions becoming a viable alternative and competitor to Mirvish Productions for commercial theatre productions in Toronto. Despite this, Mirvish offered Dan an opportunity to join as a co-producer on the Canadian production of We Will Rock You, but Dan was not optimistic about the show's chances and declined. The Canadian production of We Will Rock You ultimately was financially successful and ran for sixteen months.

Early on, Dancap Productions presented their shows in downtown Toronto at the Elgin and Winter Garden Theatres, which was rented from the Government of Ontario. However, in April 2008, Dancap Productions reached an agreement with the City of Toronto to rent the Toronto Centre for the Arts. This gave Dancap Productions another theatre to present their shows in, albeit a theatre located in North York rather than in downtown Toronto.

=== Initial successes ===
In July 2007, Dancap Productions partnered with Elephant Eye Theatrical to develop several new musicals with the aim of eventually bringing them to Broadway. As part of the agreement, Dancap had the first right to present these productions in Canada. This partnership developed The Addams Family, which was critically panned but financially successful on Broadway and had a tour stop in Toronto. They also co-produced Saved, a musical based on the 2004 film that was presented off-Broadway in 2008. Other planned productions did not pan out, however, which included a musical based on the life of Bruce Lee and a musical that features the songs of Sheryl Crow.

Between August 21, 2008, and December 6, 2008, Dancap Productions presented a national tour of Jersey Boys at the Toronto Centre for the Arts, which quickly performed to sell-out audiences and received critical acclaim. Following the success of the tour stop, Dancap Productions subsequently announced a Canadian production of Jersey Boys. The production opened on December 12, 2008 at the Toronto Centre for the Arts. It starred Jeremy Kushnier as Tommy Devito, Derek Krantz as Bob Gaudio, Michael Lomenda as Nick Massi, and Jeff Madden as Frankie Valli. The production ran for two years, closing on August 22, 2010, and was the longest running musical in the venue's history.

=== Decline and closure ===
In early-2008, Dan purchased a 12.5% equity stake in Key Brand Entertainment, who owned and operated the Canon Theatre and Panasonic Theatre in downtown Toronto. Despite this, Mirvish had already signed an agreement with Key Brand Entertainment in 2001 to manage both theatres through 2015 and retained a first right to bid for both theatres upon being placed for sale. Later in 2008, Mirvish successfully bid $35 million for both theatres after they were placed up for sale. Subsequent legal challenges that occurred in the following years attempted to prevent the sale, but were ultimately unsuccessful. This left Dancap Productions without a theatre that they owned where they could present their productions. This forced Dancap Productions to continue renting theatres, a factor which Dan attributed to the company's ultimate downfall.

As part of their 2012 season, Dancap announced they would be presenting non-equity tours of In the Heights and Shrek the Musical as part of their subscription series. This was met with significant criticism from the Canadian Actors’ Equity union, who protested this decision and asked Toronto critics to not review these productions. Dan defended his decision to present non-equity tours, stating that, while the company was mitigating their own financial risk, they were nevertheless still quality productions.

In April 2012, Dancap Productions announced that it would be closing at the end of their 2012 season. In a statement announcing the closure, Dan wrote, "With a heavy heart, I am announcing that Dancap Productions will not be presenting a 2013 subscription season. Looking toward the near-future, I do not see enough quality shows that I would like to bring to Toronto in 2013."

The final Dancap Productions show presented in Toronto was Million Dollar Quartet, which closed on 22 July 2019.

=== Subsequent events ===
In 2017, Dan returned to the Toronto theatre to present a local, re-imagined production of The Jazz Singer in partnership with the Harold Green Jewish Theatre Company. The play ran between May 23 and June 18, 2017 at the Toronto Centre for the Arts.

Also in 2017, Dan worked with Mirvish to co-produce An American in Paris on Broadway, and, in 2018, present the musical in Toronto at the Princess of Wales Theatre.

== Theatrical production history ==
=== 2007 ===
The lone show presented in the 2007 season was:

- The Drowsy Chaperone

=== 2008 ===
The shows presented in the 2008 season were:

- The 25th Annual Putnam County Spelling Bee
- 3 Mo Divas
- My Fair Lady
- Avenue Q
- Jersey Boys

=== 2009 ===
The shows presented in the 2009 season were:

- Happy Days
- Anne of Green Gables: The Musical
- The Toxic Avenger

=== 2010 ===
The shows presented in the 2010 season were:

- Miss Saigon
- South Pacific

=== 2011 ===
The shows presented in the 2011 season were:

- South Pacific
- 9 to 5
- Donny & Marie Live
- Next to Normal
- Colm Wilkinson in Concert
- Come Fly Away
- The Addams Family
- Memphis

=== 2012 ===
The shows presented in the 2012 season were:

- American Idiot
- In the Heights
- Shrek The Musical
- West Side Story
- Beauty and the Beast
- Million Dollar Quartet
