= Buddy Holly Hall of Performing Arts and Sciences =

Venue In Lubbock Texas

The Buddy Holly Hall of Performing Arts and Sciences
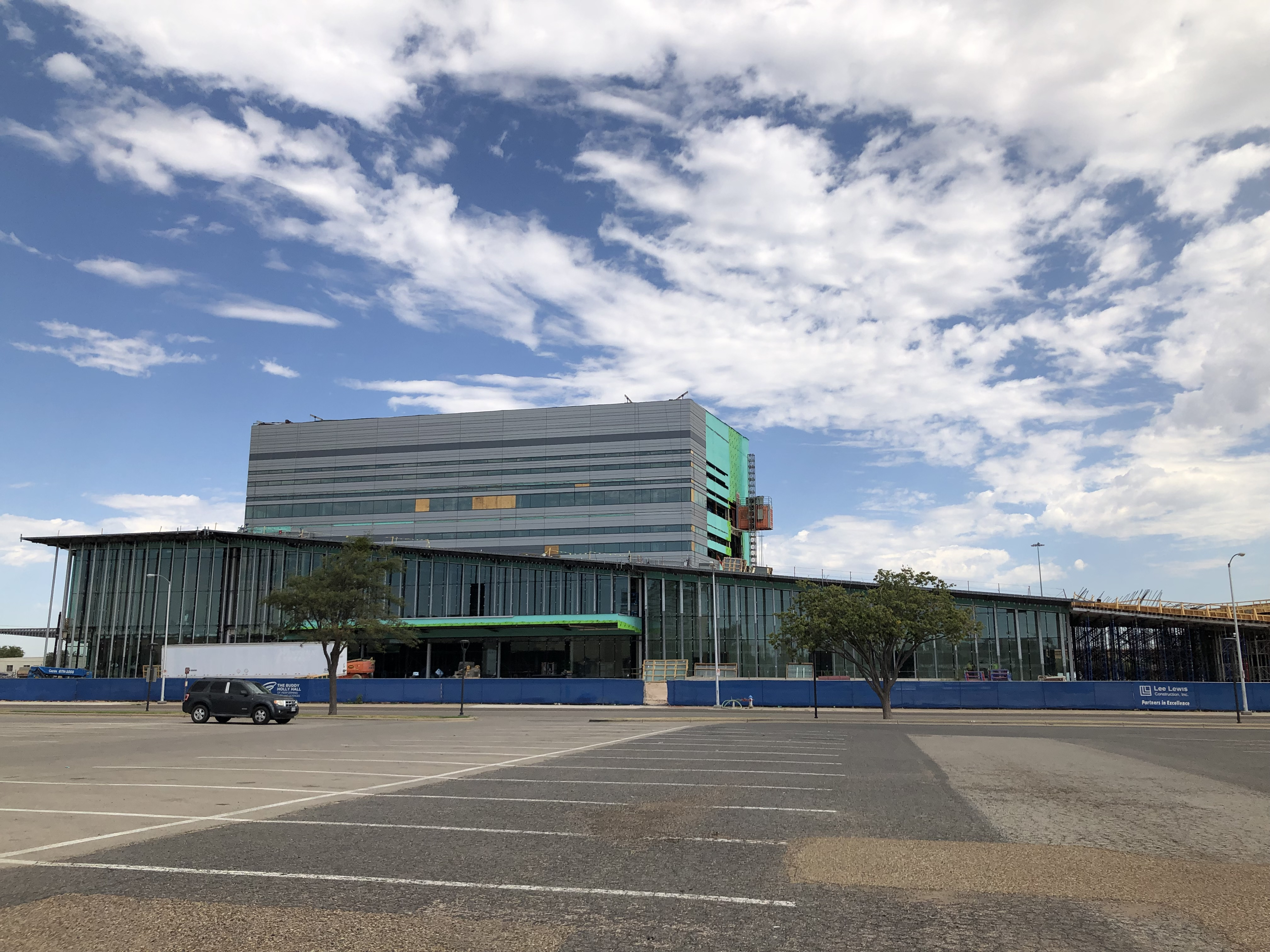
- South facade under construction, August 2019
- Interactive map of The Buddy Holly Hall of Performing Arts and Sciences
- Address: 1300 Mac Davis Lane; Lubbock, Texas 79401
- Coordinates: 33.59059°N 101.84928°W
- Owner: Lubbock Entertainment and Performing Arts Association
- Operator: ASM Global
- Type: Cultural center
- Events: Arts and sciences
- Field size: 220,000 square feet

Construction
- Groundbreaking: April 20, 2017
- Built: 2017 - 2021
- Opened: January 6, 2021
- Cost: $158 million
- Architects: Diamond Schmitt Architects, with MWM Architects and Parkhill
- Builders: Lee Lewis Construction, Inc.
- Project manager: Garfield Public/Private LLC

Website
- http://www.BuddyHollyHall.com

The Buddy Holly Hall of Performing Arts and Sciences is a new performing arts venue in Lubbock, Texas. Groundbreaking took place on April 20, 2017, with more than 500 people in attendance, including Lubbock Mayor, Dan Pope, board chairman of the Lubbock Entertainment Performing Arts Association, Tim Collins, and executive director of Ballet Lubbock, Nicholas Dragga. The venue opened in January 2021 at a cost of $158 million. To-date, LEPAA has raised more than $128 million needed to complete construction expense of The Buddy Holly Hall, with an additional $5 million raised in capital endowment funds.

== History ==
In 2013, the non profit organization Lubbock Entertainment and Performing Arts Association (LEPAA) was created in order to raise funds for the construction of a new performing arts center in Lubbock, based on the recommendations of a strategic business plan led by Garfield Public/Private LLC, the developer. In July of that year, Lubbock City Council granted the land on Mac Davis Lane soon to be vacated by Department of Public Safety Headquarters as the site for the new building, as well as up to $300,000 toward demolition of the DPS facility.

Initial plans for the building were for a 116,000 gross square foot building projected to cost $85 million; however, after collaborating further with community partners, scope for the building increased to 220,000 gross square feet at a total development cost of $156 million. The expanded program resulted in projected increased building activity and operational feasibility. Over the course of construction, Owner-directed enhancements were added to the facility resulting in a final total development cost of $158 million.

In June 2014, Buddy Holly's widow, Maria Elena Holly, gave LEPAA permission to use the name of her late husband in the title of the center, royalty free.

As of December 2022, funding for completing the construction of the building requires a further $30 million.

== Facilities ==
The building has a footprint of 220,000 square feet, and provides the following facilities:

- Helen DeVitt Jones Main Theater consisting of a four-level, 2,290-seat theater with two VIP lounges.
- The Crickets Studio Theater', a 24,225-square-foot, 386-seat theater with concessions, lounge area, dedicated lobby and private entrance.
- Ballet Lubbock Pre-Professional Academy, a 22,000-square-foot dance center complete with office and storage.
- Multipurpose Event Room will be a dividable 6,000-square-foot area suitable for a variety of functions such as lectures, receptions, music rehearsals, banquets and meetings.
- Food and Dining. A 2,500-square-foot commercial kitchen to accommodate venue catering, plus an on-site restaurant named "Rave On" with seating for 100 people.
- Christine DeVitt Main Lobby. This area will serve as the main entrance to the hall and will accommodate 300 people for banquets, galas and weddings.

== Opening ==
The Buddy Holly Hall opened in January 2021 with COVID-19 restrictions in place. Although the first few events were mainly Lubbock Independent School District or Lubbock Symphony Orchestra performances, comedian Steve Treviño was the first event open to the public on Jan. 30.
