= Teva Canada =

Canadian generic pharamcutical manufacturer

Teva Canada Limited
- Industry: Health Care
- Founded: 1965
- Headquarters: 30 Novopharm Court; Toronto, Ontario; M1B 2K9
- Products: Generic Pharmaceuticals
- Website: www.tevacanada.com

Teva Canada is one of Canada's largest generic pharmaceutical companies. The company was founded as Novopharm by Leslie Dan in 1965. After its acquisition by pharmaceutical giant Teva Pharmaceutical Industries in 2000, it was renamed Teva Novopharm. The Novopharm name was dropped in 2010, when it became Teva Canada.

== History of the company ==
Novopharm was founded by pharmacist and businessman Leslie Dan in 1965. Its first product was the generic antibiotic, tetracycline. The company expanded to become Canada's second largest generic drug manufacturer and it also owned sites in the US and Hungary by the mid 1990s. In Hungary, the company owned a small subsidiary called Human. In the US, it operated a distribution centre in Schaumburg, Illinois, although all products continued to be made in Canada. Novopharm was the first generic company to market a generic version of Glaxo's Zantac for the US market.

Novopharm remained privately held by the Dan family until 2000, when it was acquired by Teva Pharmaceuticals. At the time, Novopharm was Canada's second largest drug manufacturer. Teva, a generic drug manufacturer based in Jerusalem, Israel, was already one of the world's largest generic manufacturers. The acquisition made Teva the largest generic drug company in North America.

== Facilities and markets served ==
Teva Canada maintains several facilities in the Toronto area, including its headquarters in Scarborough, a specialized antibiotics manufacturing facility in Markham, and their main manufacturing facility in Stouffville. Their headquarters is also home to their main laboratory, packaging, and warehousing operations. According to their promotional brochure, their Markham site, which underwent a major expansion in 2004, is the largest antibiotic manufacturing facility in North America.

In addition to the Canadian drug market, products manufactured by Teva Canada are exported worldwide under the Teva name.
