= Meridian Arts Centre =

Toronto performing arts venue

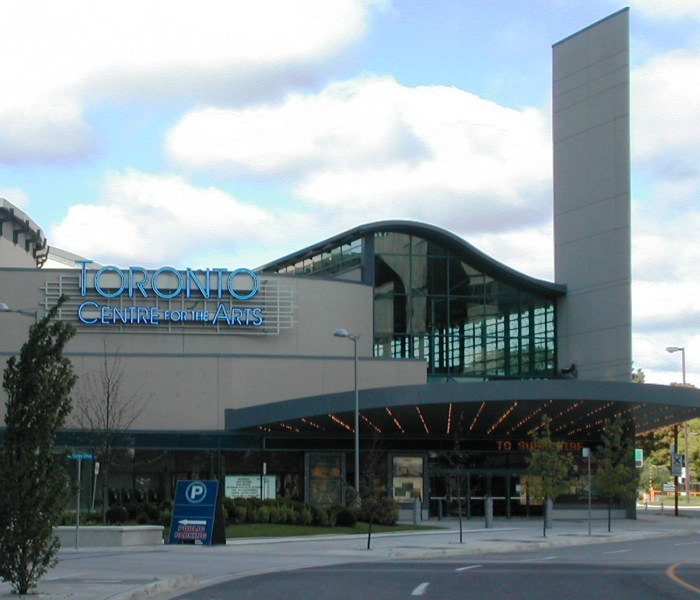
- Interactive map of Meridian Arts Centre
- Former names: North York Performing Arts Centre (1993–94); Ford Centre for the Performing Arts (1994–98); Toronto Centre for the Arts (1998–2019)
- Address: 5040 Yonge Street; Toronto, Ontario; M2N 6R8
- Coordinates: 43.766159°N 79.414549°W
- Owner: City of Toronto

Construction
- Opened: October 16, 1993
- Architect: Eberhard Zeidler

Website
- www.meridianartscentre.com

The Meridian Arts Centre is a performing arts venue in the North York district of Toronto, Ontario, Canada. It opened on October 16, 1993, as the North York Performing Arts Centre and was designed by Canadian architect Eberhard Zeidler for musicals, theatre productions and other performing arts. At opening, North York awarded management of the centre to Livent, which sold the naming rights in 1994 to Ford Motor Company of Canada. It became the Ford Centre for the Performing Arts. Later, it debranded as the Toronto Centre for the Arts.

In January 2019, TO Live (formerly Civic Theatres Toronto, a City of Toronto agency which manages and operates the St. Lawrence Centre for the Arts, Toronto Centre for the Arts, and the Sony Centre for the Performing Arts) announced a new sponsorship deal with Meridian Credit Union, which saw the theatre rebranded in September 2019.

== Facility ==
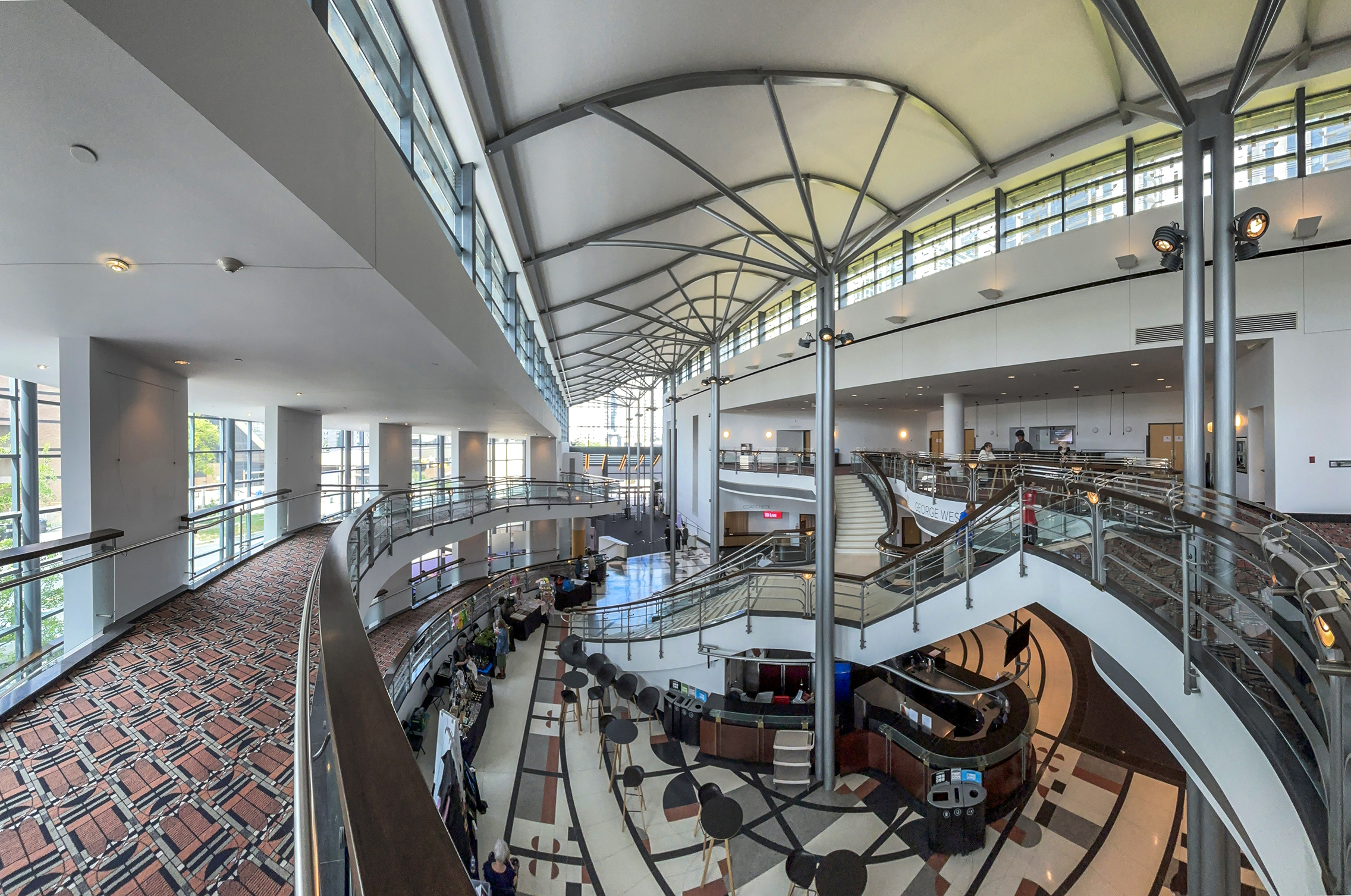
Lobby

The building originally housed three theatres: the Main Stage Theatre with 1,727 seats, the George Weston Recital Hall with 1,036 seats, and the multi-purpose, 200-seat Studio Theatre. When Livent declared bankruptcy in 1998, the City of Toronto government assumed control of the facility.

The Main Stage was home to Dancap Productions' Canadian production of Jersey Boys from August 2008 until August 2010. Prior to Jersey Boys, the facility was the home of the Andrew Lloyd Webber musical Sunset Boulevard in 1995 and a 1993 production of Show Boat that transferred to Broadway.

After Dancap ceased operation, the centre had difficulty finding enough tenants for the Main Stage, and began a series of renovations from 2014 to 2016 that divided the Main Stage into two smaller theatres. The Greenwin Theatre seats 296 and was built on the original stage and backstage areas, while the remainder of the original auditorium became the Lyric Theatre, seating 576 and featuring LED backlit acoustic panels that can change colour with the lighting design.

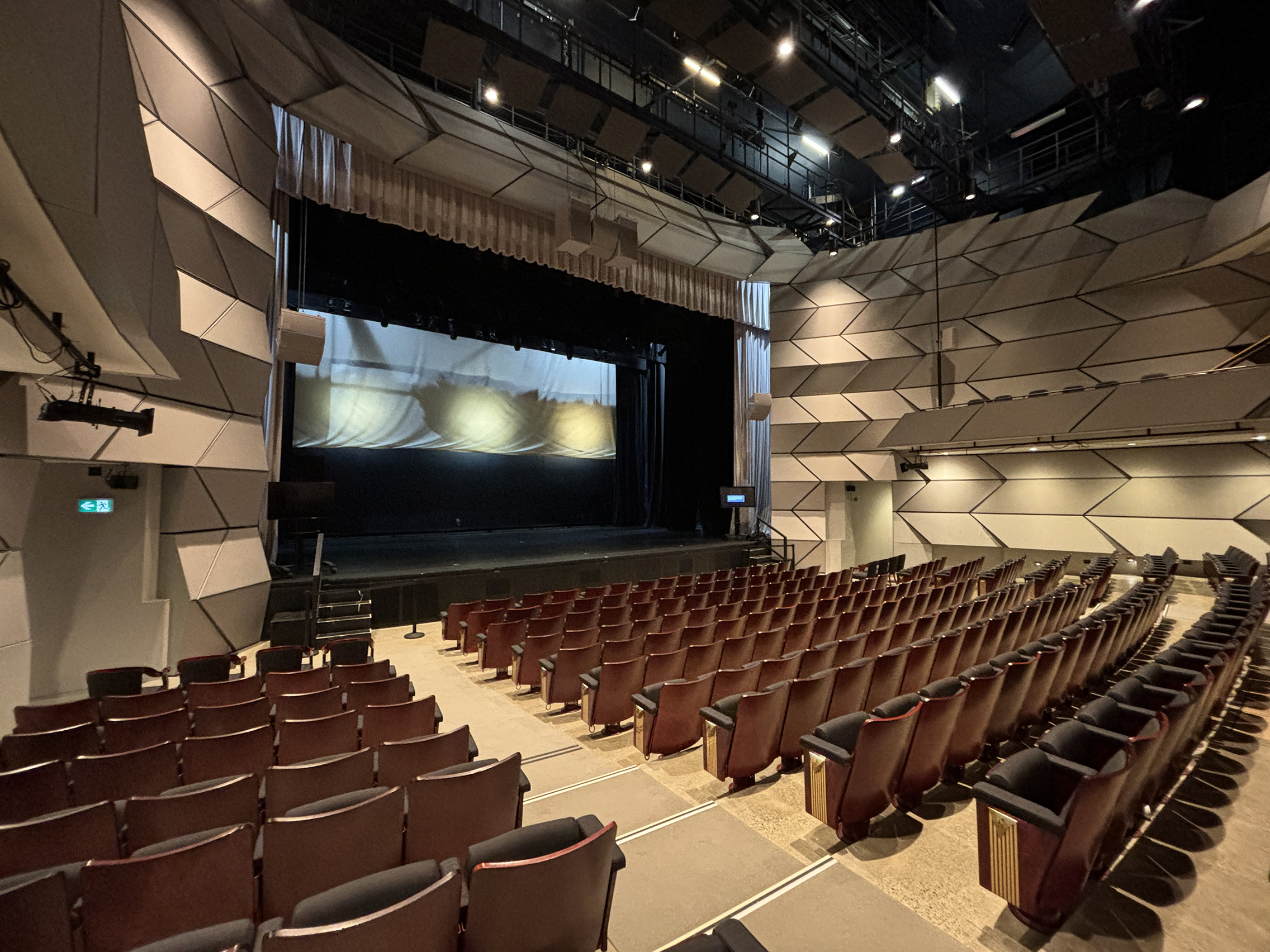
Lyric Theatre

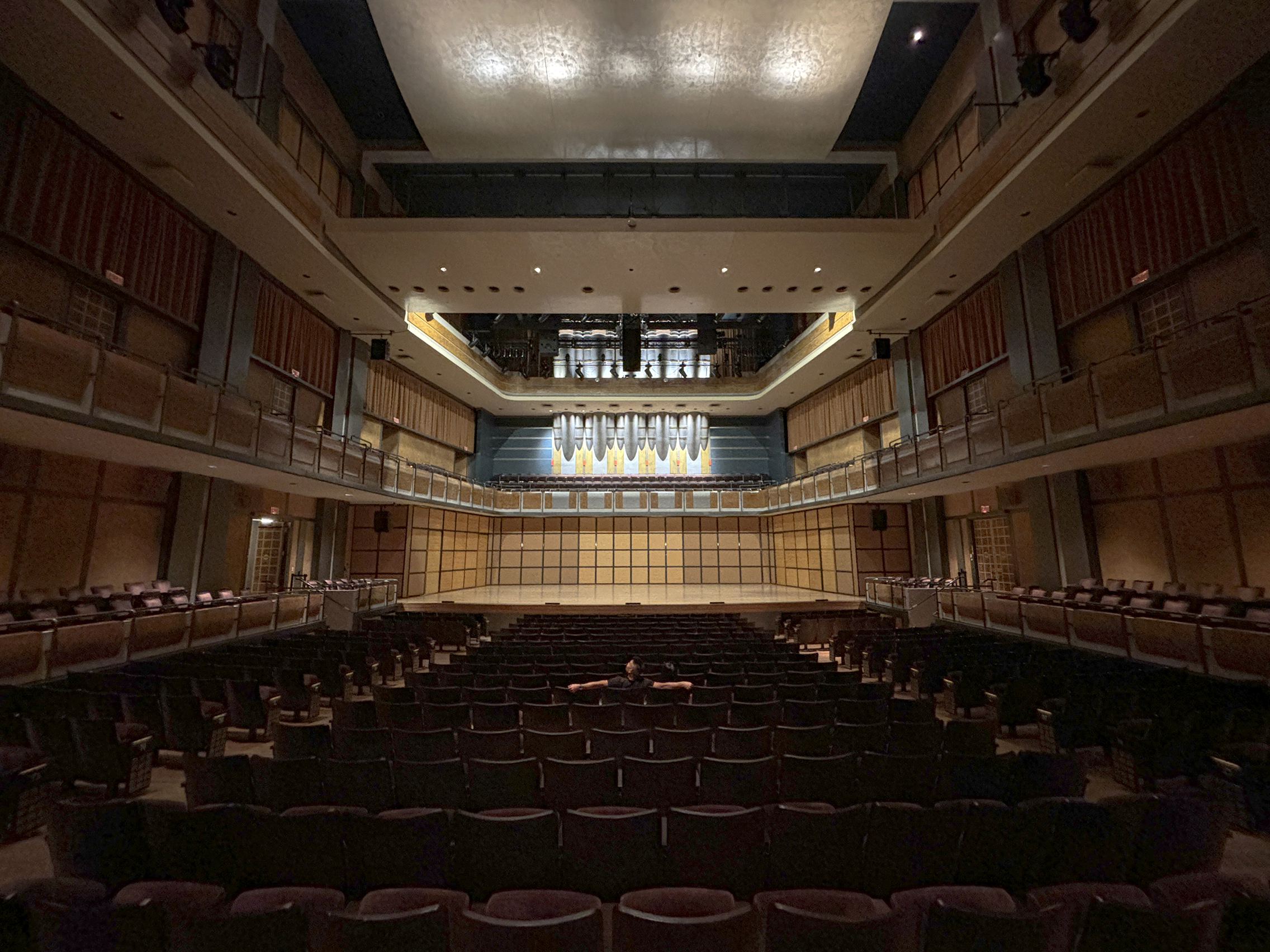
George Weston Recital Hall

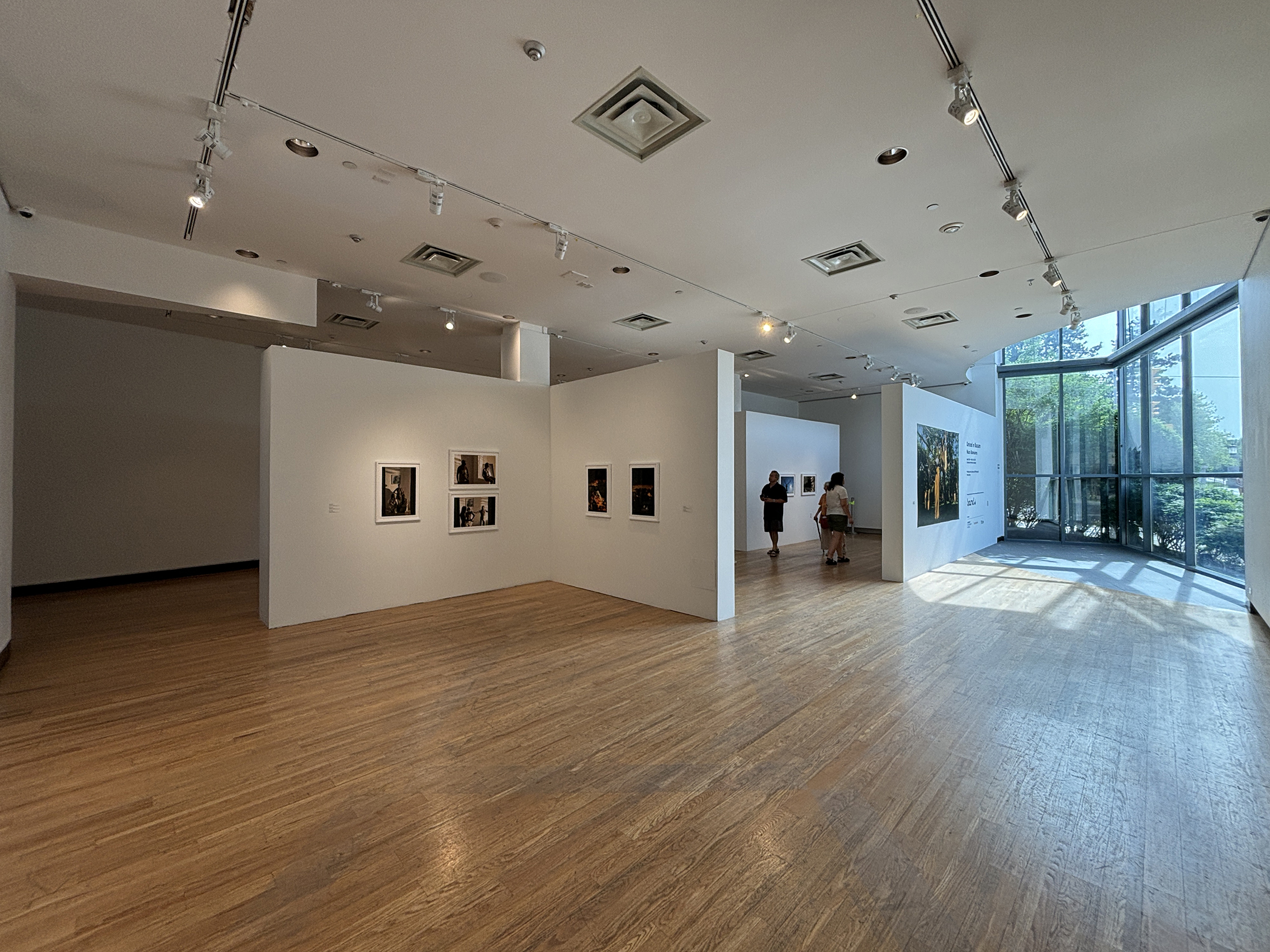
Lower Galleries

== See also ==
- List of music venues in Toronto
