= Diamond Schmitt Architects =

Canadian architectural firm

Diamond Schmitt Architects Inc.
- Type: Private
- Industry: Architecture
- Founded: 1975
- Founders: Jack Diamond; Donald Schmitt
- Headquarters: Toronto, Ontario, Canada
- Services: Architecture, Urban Design, Master Planning
- Website: www.dsai.ca

Diamond Schmitt Architects is a Canadian architectural firm founded in 1975. It is headquartered in Toronto, Ontario. The firm was founded by architects Jack Diamond and Donald Schmitt.

== History ==
Diamond was the founding director of the University of Toronto's Master of Architecture program. Diamond worked closely with Barton Myers, an American and Canadian architect, and is currently the president of Barton Myers Associates Inc. Myers established his own practice with Diamond in Toronto in 1968. Starting this year, the architects founded their new firm Diamond and Myers. The two eventually split in 1975. Diamond Schmitt Architecture would not officially begin until 1974 when Jack Diamond established his own firm, A.J Diamond Architects.

It was around this time that the partnership between Jack Diamond and Donald Schmitt began. Schmitt studied architecture at the University of Toronto where Diamond had worked, continuing his education until 1978. After thirteen years of A.J. Diamond Architects, in 1989, the firm had developed further when Jack Diamond partnered with Schmitt.

== Founding ==
Abel Joseph "Jack" Diamond was born in 1932 in South Africa, and had arrived in Canada in 1964, the same year he started working for the University of Toronto. In 1970, Diamond had begun renovating a ceramics manufacturing plant, and adding living spaces on one of the floors. Five years later, Diamond established his company A.J Diamond architects, and three years later he would form his partnership with Donald Schmitt and Company.

Donald Schmitt was born 1951 in South Porcupine, a small mining town in northern Ontario. He went to high school at the University of Toronto Schools (UTS) and studied afterwards at the University of Toronto's Faculty of Architecture.

Apart from the firm's founding principals, there are also 19 other principals, 12 senior associates, 37 associates, 8 directors, 129 registered graduates and student architects, and a support staff of 43.

== Works ==
Buildings designed either in part or in full by Diamond Schmitt Architects
Building name	Image	Location	Years built	Notes
Canada
Bahen Centre for Information Technology		Toronto, Ontario	2002–2003	Located on the St. George campus of the University of Toronto.
The Image Centre		Toronto, Ontario	2008–2012	Formerly the Ryerson Image Centre, located at Toronto Metropolitan University.
Environmental Science and Chemistry Building		Toronto, Ontario	2013–2015	Located on the Scarborough campus of the University of Toronto.
Senate of Canada Building		Ottawa, Ontario	2014–2018	Interior renovation.
Robarts Common		Toronto, Ontario	2017–2022	Addition to Robarts Library on the St. George campus of the University of Toronto.
York University Markham Campus		Markham, Ontario	2020–2024	A new campus of York University in Markham.
Oak House		Toronto, Ontario	2021–2025	Student residence on the St. George campus of the University of Toronto.
TMU School of Medicine		Brampton, Ontario	2024–2025	A new satellite campus of Toronto Metropolitan University in Brampton.
Ādisōke		Ottawa, Ontario	2020–present	New joint facility between Ottawa Public Library and Library and Archives Canada.
Myron and Berna Garron Health Sciences Complex		Toronto, Ontario	2024–present	Building to house the new Scarborough Academy of Medicine and Integrated Health on the Scarborough campus of the University of Toronto.
Atlantic Science Enterprise Centre		Moncton, New Brunswick	2024–present	
Clinical Support and Research Centre		Vancouver, British Columbia	2024–present	Located at St. Paul’s Hospital.
New Brunswick Museum		Saint John, New Brunswick	2024–present	
McGill Sustainability Park		Montreal, Quebec	2025–present	Formerly the New Vic Project, located at the Royal Victoria Hospital, McGill University.
Dani Reiss Modern and Contemporary Gallery		Toronto, Ontario	TBA	Part of the Art Gallery of Ontario.
James and Louise Temerty Building		Toronto, Ontario	TBA	Will house the Temerty Faculty of Medicine on the St. George campus of the University of Toronto.
United States
Buddy Holly Hall of Performing Arts and Sciences		Lubbock, Texas	2017–2021	

== Awards ==
Diamond Schmitt Architects has received numerous regional, national and international awards for excellence in design. The firm was recognized in 2009 by Deloitte LLP, the Canadian Imperial Bank of Commerce, KPMG, and the Queen's University School of Business as being one of the 50 Best Managed Companies in Canada.

=== Canadian Governor General's Awards for Architecture ===
- Village Terrace, Toronto, Ontario, 1985
- Citadel Theatre, Edmonton, Alberta, 1986
- Metro Toronto YMCA, Toronto, Ontario, 1986
- Earth Sciences Centre, University of Toronto, Toronto, Ontario, 1994
- Richmond Hill Central Library, Richmond Hill, Ontario, 1994
- York University Student Centre, Toronto, Ontario, 1996
- Bridgepoint Hospital, Toronto, Ontario 2016

=== Ontario Architect's Association Awards ===
- 2024: David Geffen Hall
- 2022: Buddy Holly Hall of Performing Arts and Sciences
- 2020: Senate of Canada Building in joint Venture with KWC Architects Inc
- 2007: Four Seasons Centre for the Performing Arts

=== BusinessWeek/Architectural Record Awards ===
- 2004: Israeli Ministry of Foreign Affairs, Jerusalem, Israel
- 2007: The Four Seasons Centre for the Performing Arts, Toronto, Ontario, Canada
- 2008: Shakespeare Theatre at the Harman Center for the Arts, Washington, D.C., USA
