= Mowat Block =

Government building in Toronto, Ontario

Coordinates: 43.66319°N 79.38730°W

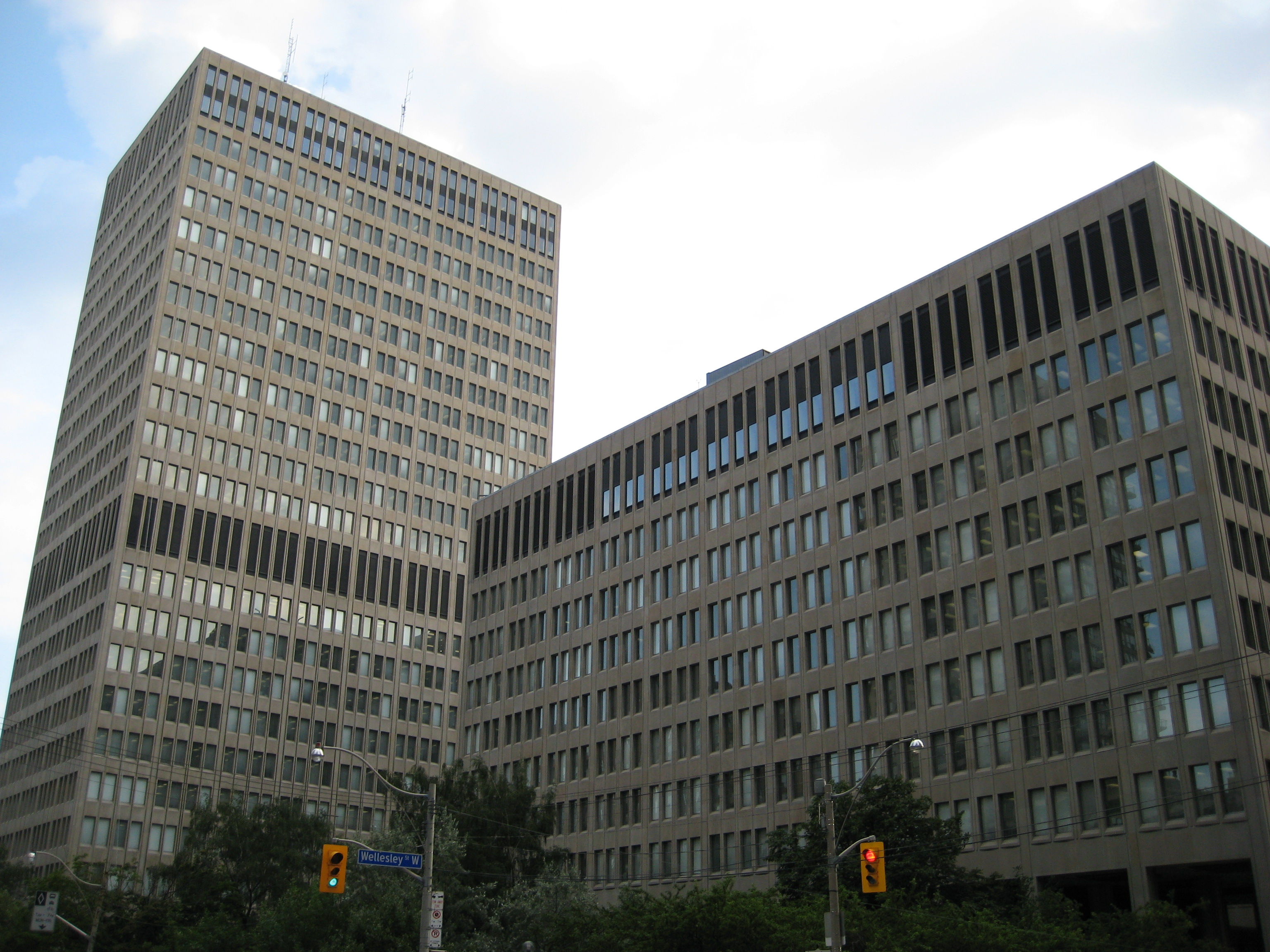
Mowat (left) and Hearst (right) Blocks

The Mowat Block is an office building in Toronto, Ontario, home to the provincial Ministry of Education, Ministry of Advanced Education and Skills Development (MAESD), and Infrastructure. It is part of a massive 24 storey government complex east of Queen's Park at College Street and University Avenue. It is one of the buildings of the large complex called Ontario Government Buildings next to the Ontario Legislative Building.

The International Style office building was designed by Shore Tilbe Henschel Irwin Architects and Engineers (now Shore Tilbe Irwin + Partners), and built in the 1960s and named for former Premier and Father of Confederation Sir Oliver Mowat. Mowat Block is also home to other provincial offices. It is located at 900 Bay Street.

Other government buildings nearby include:

- Macdonald Block
- Ferguson Block
- Whitney Block
- Ontario Power Building
- Hearst Block
- 222 Jarvis Street
