= Macdonald Block =

Macdonald Block may refer to:

- Macdonald Block (Victoria, British Columbia), Canada
- Macdonald Block Complex, Toronto, Canada
