= Frost Building =

Building in Ontario, Canada

Coordinates: 43.660968°N 79.389508°W

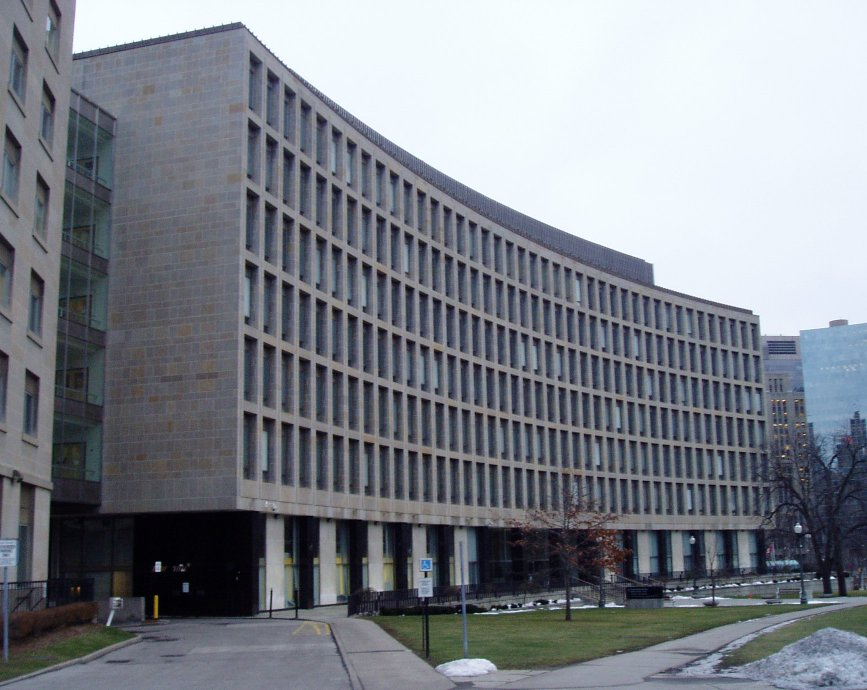
The Frost Building

The Frost Building is a curved 7 and 6 storey office building complex on the south east side of Queen's Park Crescent in Toronto, Ontario, Canada. The Government of Ontario owns the building and is part of the large Queen's Park campus. The Frost Building is home to the Ontario Ministry of Finance and Treasury Board Secretariat. It is divided into a North block, located on 95 Grosvenor St, and a South block, located on 7 Queen's Park Crescent. A five-storey glass walkway connects the two blocks from the 2nd and 6th floors.

The building is named after Leslie Frost, Premier of Ontario for over a decade starting in 1949.

The Frost Building is also commonly referred to as the Ontario Treasury Building. The south block of the building has seven floors. The top floor houses the Office of the Minister of Finance and the Office of the Deputy Minister of Finance. The current Finance Minister of Ontario is Peter Bethlenfalvy and the Deputy Minister of Finance is Jason Fitzsimmons.

The building is a landmark of modern office building architecture in Canada, dating from the early 1950s. It was one of the first totally "modern look" buildings without any of the fancy curlicues of older buildings. It was also original in that it follows the curve of the street on which it resides. The north block was built in the 1960s as an addition to the South Block.

The Ontario Firefighters' Memorial is located in a small parkette to the southwest corner of the building.

The building is connected by tunnel to the Queen's Park (TTC) subway station, Whitney Block, and Macdonald Block Complex.

== See also ==
- Ontario Government Buildings
- Whitney Block
- Ontario Power Building
