= Stephen Irwin (architect) =

Canadian architect (1939–2019)

- Stephen Irwin in his office at Shore Tilbe Irwin + Partners in Toronto
- Born: Stephen Van Egmond Irwin; March 10, 1939; Oakville, Ontario
- Died: March 5, 2019 (aged 79); Toronto, Ontario
- Education: Harvard University
- Occupation: Architect
- Awards: British Prix de Rome (1963); Fellow of the Royal Architectural Institute of Canada
- Practice: Shore Tilbe Irwin + Partners
- Buildings: Toronto Police Headquarters; Xerox Research Centre, Mississauga; Queen's University Bioscience Complex; Purdy's Wharf, Halifax; Mississauga Central Library.

Stephen Van Egmond Irwin RAIC, RIBA, OAA, BArch, MArch (March 10, 1939 – March 5, 2019) was a Canadian architect and "partner emeritus" of Shore Tilbe Irwin + Partners in Toronto, Ontario.

== Biography ==
Irwin trained at the University of Toronto, where he was a member of the Alpha Delta Phi fraternity. He later studied at Harvard University, where he received MArch. In 1963 he received the British Prix de Rome in Architecture.

Irwin began his design career in 1962 in Sweden, for Gronwall-Hirsch, and worked for one year in London, England, for Casson, Conder and Partners. He returned to Canada in 1965, where he joined Shore & Moffat (now Shore Tilbe Irwin + Partners). He was a partner of the firm from 1971.

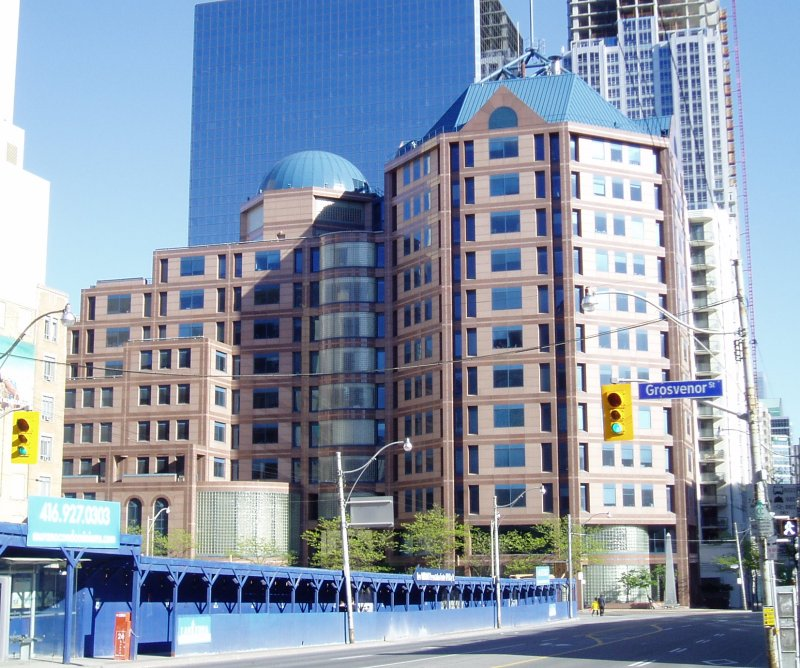
Toronto Police Headquarters

Irwin died on March 5, 2019.

== Buildings ==
- Bioscience Complex, Queen's University, Kingston, Ontario
- Central Library, Mississauga, Ontario
- Xerox Research Centre, Mississauga, Ontario
- Toronto Police Headquarters
- Purdy's Wharf office complex, Halifax, Nova Scotia
