= Whitney Block =

Provincial government building in Ontario, Canada

Coordinates: 43.663124°N 79.389774°W

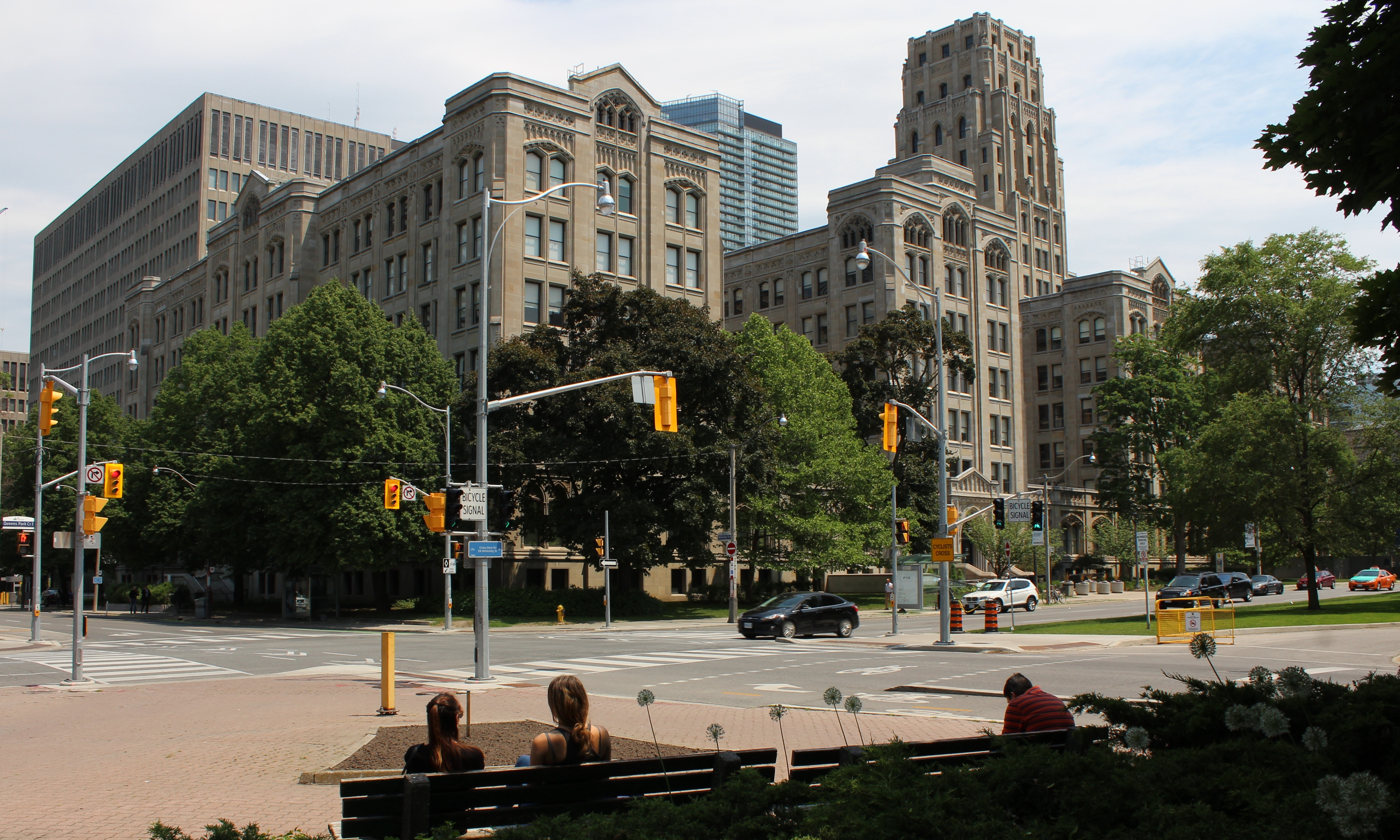
- View of Whitney Block from Queen's Park
- Interactive map of the Whitney Block area
- Former names: East Block

General information
- Architectural style: Modern Gothic/Art Deco
- Location: 99 Wellesley Street West, Toronto, Ontario, Canada
- Current tenants: Government of Ontario
- Named for: James Whitney
- Completed: 1926
- Renovated: 1932 (tower constructed)
- Owner: The Crown in Right of Ontario

Design and construction
- Architect: Francis R. Heakes

The Whitney Block is a Government of Ontario office building located in Toronto, Ontario, Canada. It is located across the street from the Ontario Legislative Building, and contains the offices of the premier of Ontario and most cabinet ministers. The street address of Whitney Block is 99 Wellesley Street West, though the principal facade faces west towards Queen's Park Crescent and the Ontario Legislature. The building is linked to the legislature by a tunnel under the street, by a bridge to the Macdonald Block, and through there via another tunnel to the subway. The Modern Gothic-Art Deco structure was built in 1926 by architect F. R. Heakes and the tower was added in 1932. Whitney Block is faced with Queenston limestone. The facade is ornamented by repeated sequences of quatrefoils, and figures designed by Charles Adamson, which represent abstract ideals like justice, tolerance, wisdom and power, as well as more ordinary pursuits such a mining, forestry, labour, law, education and farming. The floors are made of marble mined in Bancroft.

At its completion it was one of the tallest buildings in Toronto. It was originally known as the East Block, but it is now known as the Whitney Block in honour of former premier James P. Whitney.

While no longer used for office space, the tower remains a distinctive feature of the building and contains one of the few operational hand-cranked elevators remaining in Toronto. The building also once contained a bowling alley and a section set aside for live domestic and farm animals.

Being one of Ontario’s oldest government buildings, Whitney Block went under a rehabilitation project contracted by Brown Daniel Associates. Starting in January 2018 and completing in August of 2023, it received new HVAC systems, modernized office spaces, new windows and frames with some that feature Ontario’s trillium symbols, and much more.

The Ministries of Natural Resources and Forestry, Government and Consumer Services, and Northern Development and Mines are located at Whitney Block.

Other government buildings nearby include:

- Mowat Block
- Macdonald Block
- Ontario Power Building
- Hearst Block
- Frost Building
