= Ontario Legislative Building =

Legislative building in Toronto, Canada

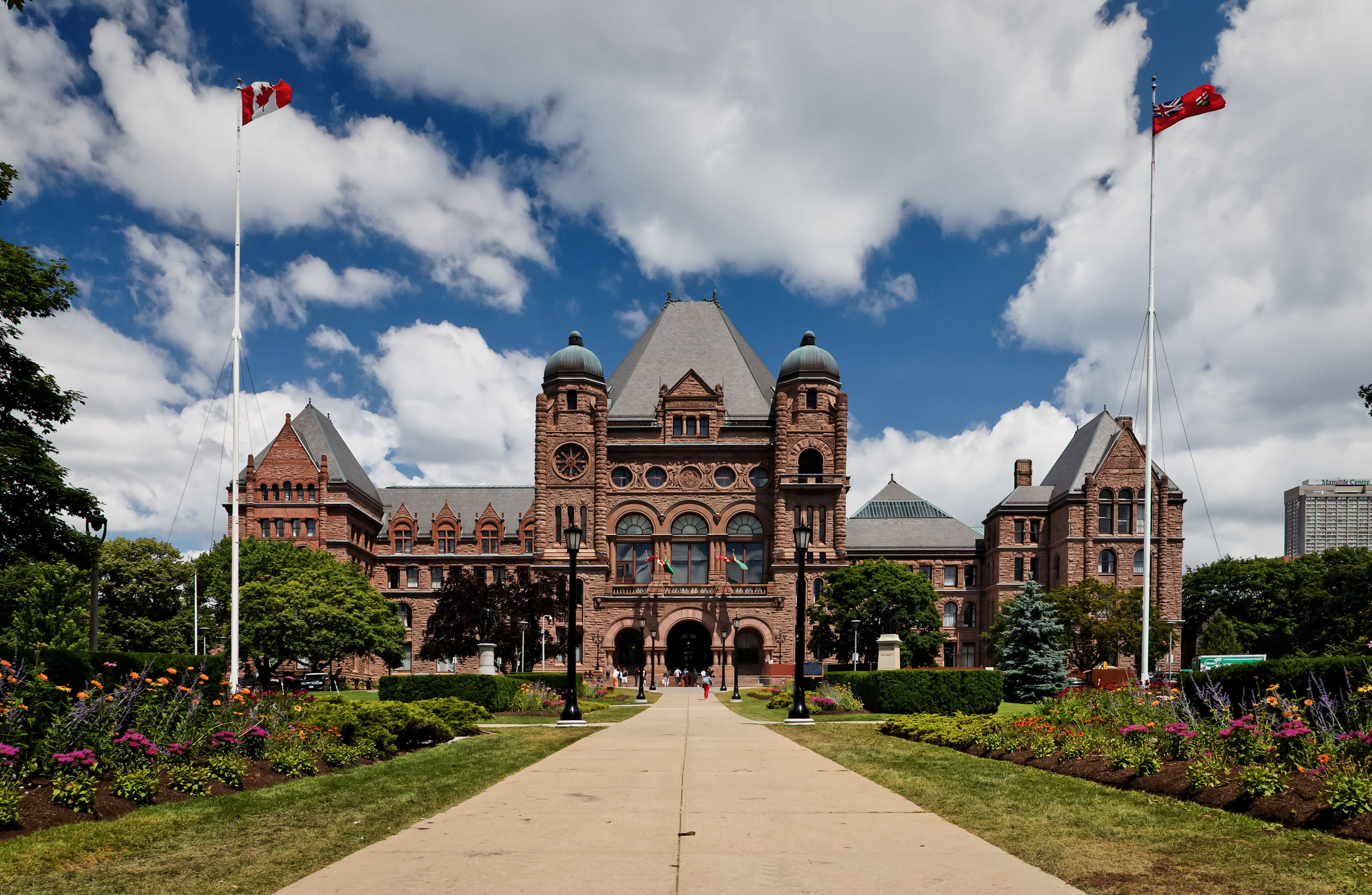
- The south façade of the Ontario Legislative Building

General information
- Architectural style: Richardsonian Romanesque
- Location: Toronto, Ontario, Canada
- Coordinates: 43.662447°N 79.391708°W
- Construction started: 1886; 140 years ago
- Completed: 1909; 117 years ago
- Opened: 4 April 1893; 133 years ago
- Client: The King in Right of Ontario
- Owner: The King in Right of Ontario (building); University of Toronto (land)

Technical details
- Structural system: Iron and timber framing

Design and construction
- Architects: Richard A. Waite (main wing); George Wallace Gouinlock (north wing); E.J. Lennox (additional floors to west wing)

The Ontario Legislative Building (French: L'édifice de l'Assemblée législative de l'Ontario) is a structure in central Toronto, Ontario, Canada. It houses the Legislative Assembly of Ontario, and the viceregal suite of the Lieutenant Governor of Ontario and offices for members of the provincial parliament (MPPs). The building is surrounded by Queen's Park, sitting on that part south of Wellesley Street, which is the former site of King's College (later the University of Toronto), which was leased from the university by the municipal government of Toronto in 1859, for a "peppercorn" payment of CAD$1 per annum on a 999-year term. The southern portion of the site was later handed over to the provincial government.

The building and the provincial government are both often referred to by the metonym "Queen's Park".

== Architecture ==
=== Exterior ===
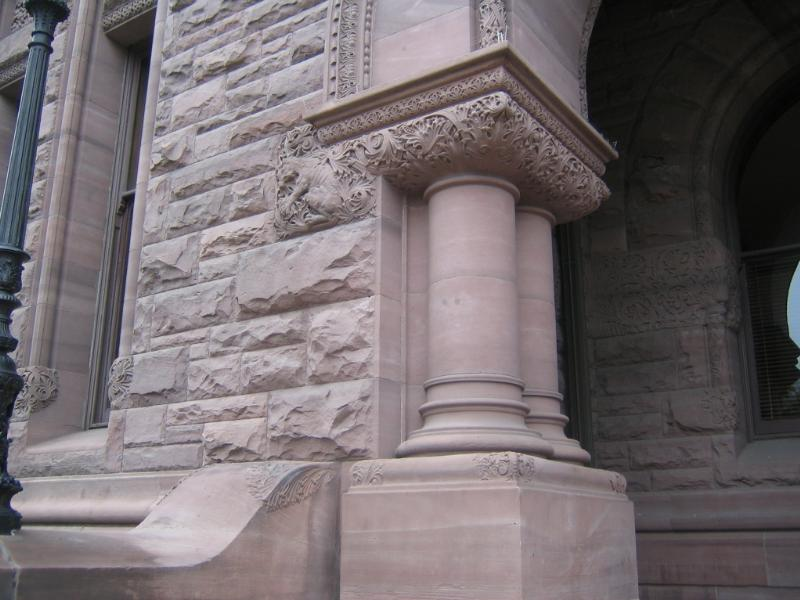
The building's exterior is defined by its characteristic pink-hue sandstone.

Designed by Richard A. Waite, the Ontario Legislative Building is an asymmetrical, five-storey structure built in the Richardsonian Romanesque style, with a load-bearing iron frame. This is clad inside and out in Canadian materials where possible; the 10.5 million bricks were made by inmates of the Central Prison, and the Ontario sandstone—with a pink hue that has earned the building the colloquial name of The Pink Palace—comes from the Credit River valley and Orangeville, Ontario, and was given a rustic finish for most of the exterior, but dressed for trim around windows and other edges. There can also be seen over the edifice a multitude of stone carvings, including gargoyles, grotesques, and friezes. The exterior is punctuated with uncharacteristically large windows, allowed by the nature of the iron structure.

The 1909 North Wing was built by noted Toronto architect George Wallace Gouinlock and E.J. Lennox added two floors to the west wing.

The main façade fronts south, with the central axis of the building an extension of that for University Avenue, meaning that the Legislative Building creates a terminating vista for the north end of that main thoroughfare. The Legislative Chamber is directly on this axis, in the centre of the building, and is lit by the three large and prominent arched windows above the main portico. This block is flanked by two domed towers, the west of which was originally intended to hold a clock, but was fitted with a rose window instead, after funds for the clock were never amassed.

The asymmetry of the south face was not originally as strong as it is at present; the west wing was designed to have three storeys under a pyramidal roof, as the east wing is still formed nowadays. After the fire of 1909, however, the west side of the Legislative Building was repaired and expanded, with an added fourth floor that bears wall dormer windows in a long, gabled roof. At the far termini of the east–west axis, the wings each turn at right angles and extend north, enclosing a three-sided courtyard, in which sits the 1909 block, a free-standing, four storey structure that is rectangular in plan.

=== Interior ===
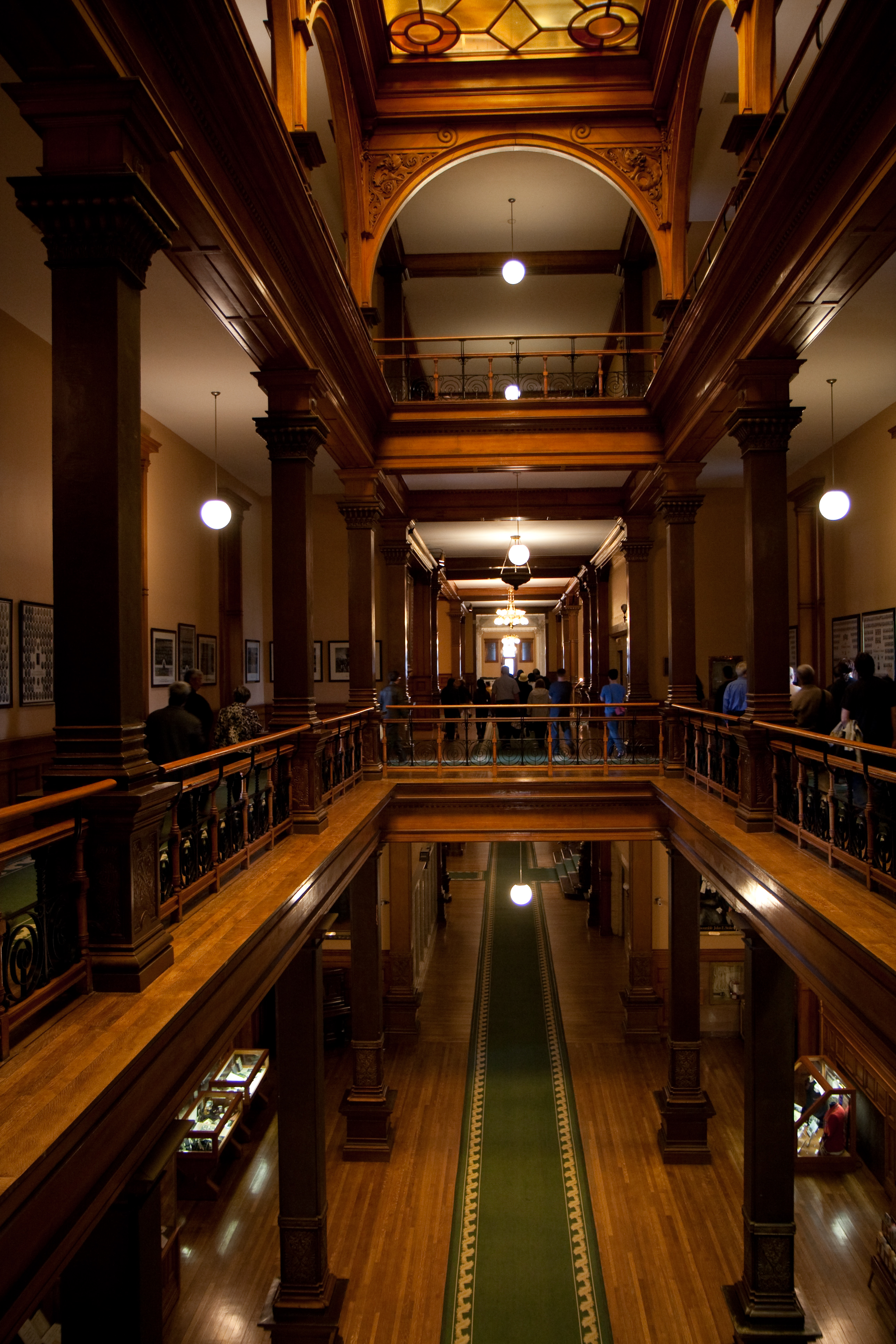
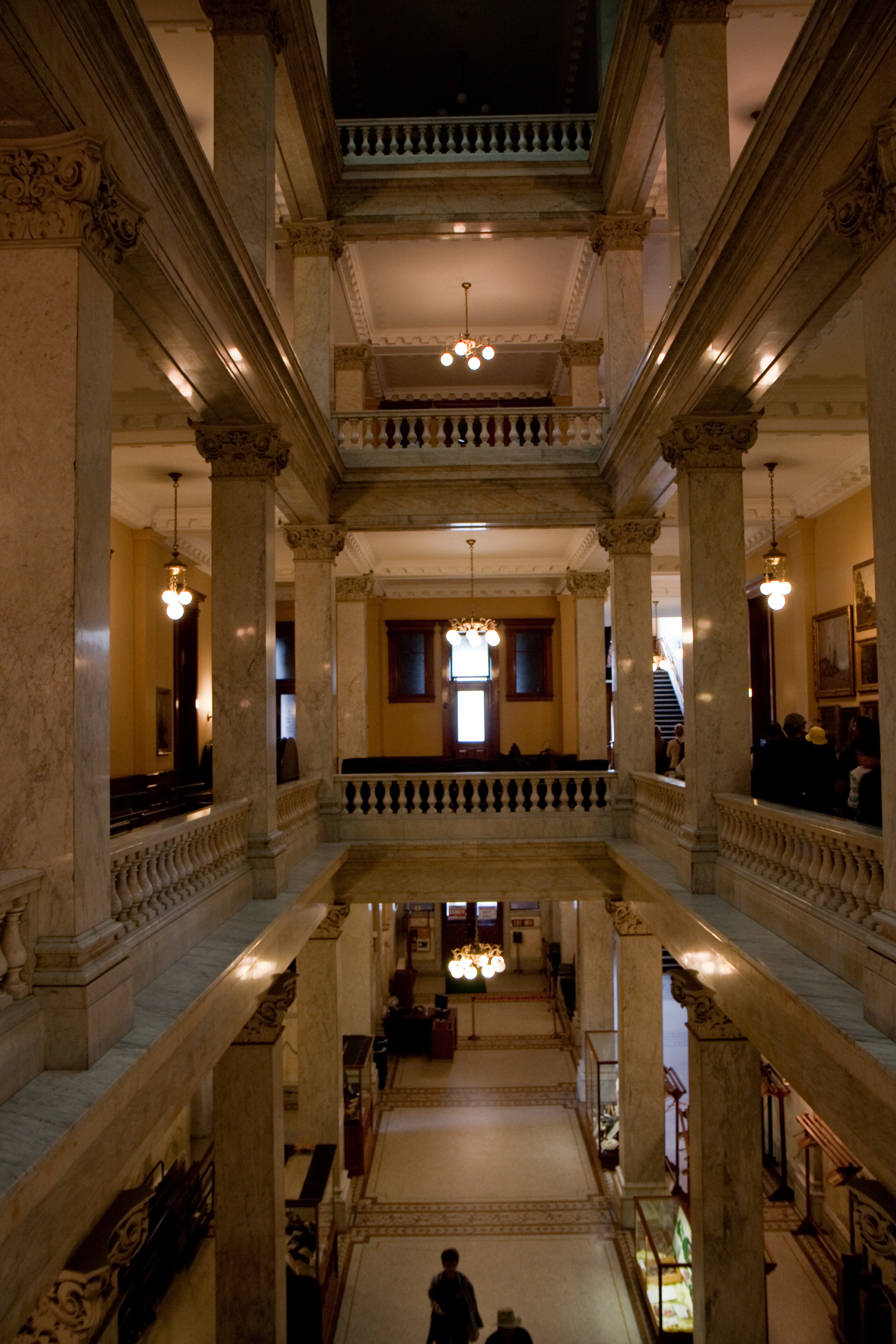
Interior of the building's east wing (left) and west wing (right).

Inside, a central hall runs between the main entrance at the south and a grand staircase directly opposite, from the mid-landing of which is accessed the parliamentary library in the 1909 block. At the top landing of this stair is the lobby of the legislative chamber, with the door to which centrally aligned in the south wall. From this core, wide corridors extend east and west, each bisected by a long and narrow atrium lined with ornate railings; the east wing is decorated more in the Victorian fashion in which it was built, with dark wood panelling, while the west wing corridor is more Edwardian Neoclassical in style, the walls lined with white marble, and reflecting the time in which it was built.

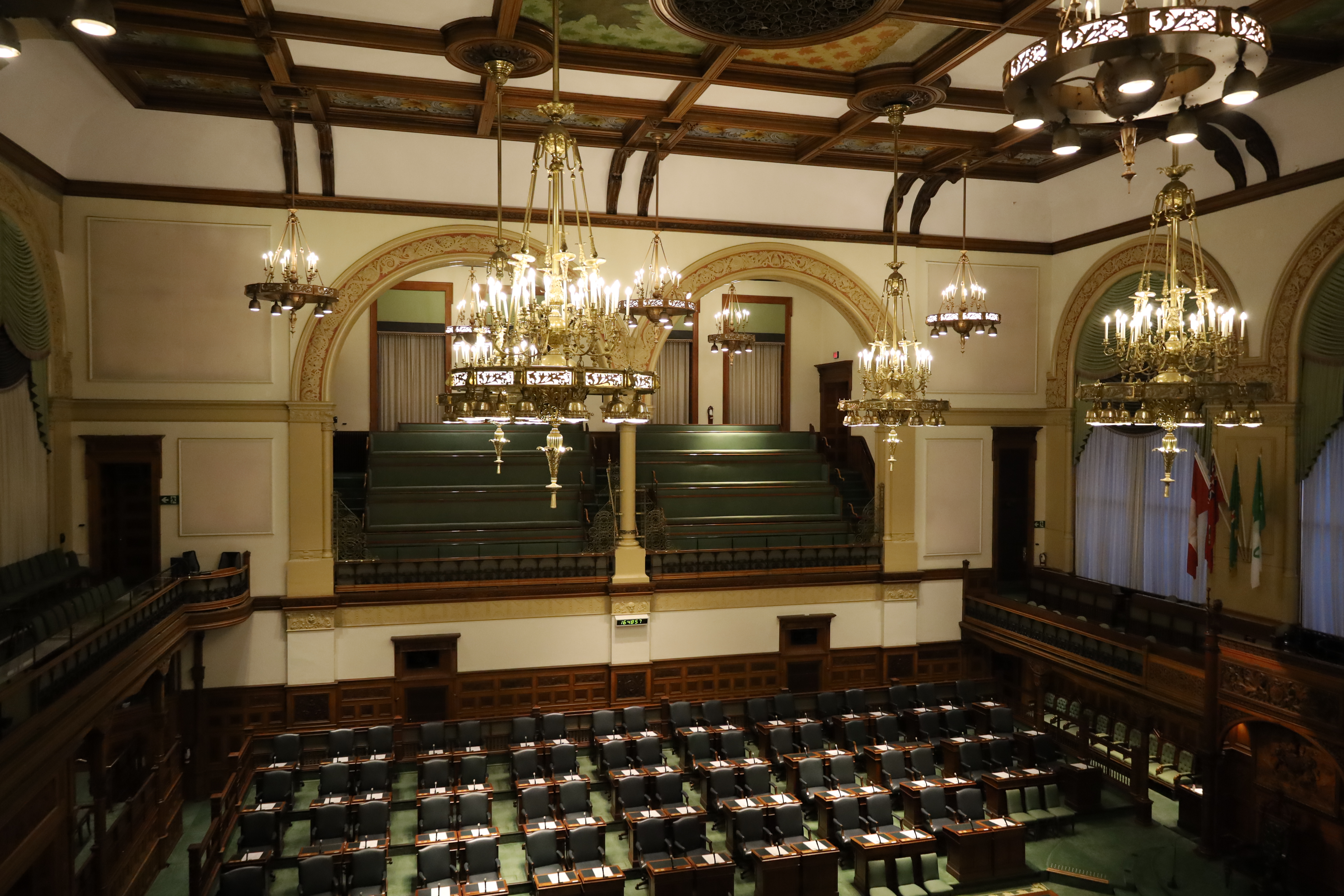
Chamber of the Legislative Assembly of Ontario in 2023

To the south of the Legislative Building is an open area with extensive tree cover, which is often used for public gatherings and demonstrations. The provincial ministries are housed in the separate Ontario Government Buildings complex to the east, including the Macdonald complex (composed of the Hearst, Mowat, Ferguson and Hepburn towers) and the Whitney Block.

The building is featured on both the front and back covers of Rush's 1981 album Moving Pictures.

==== Lieutenant Governor's Suite ====
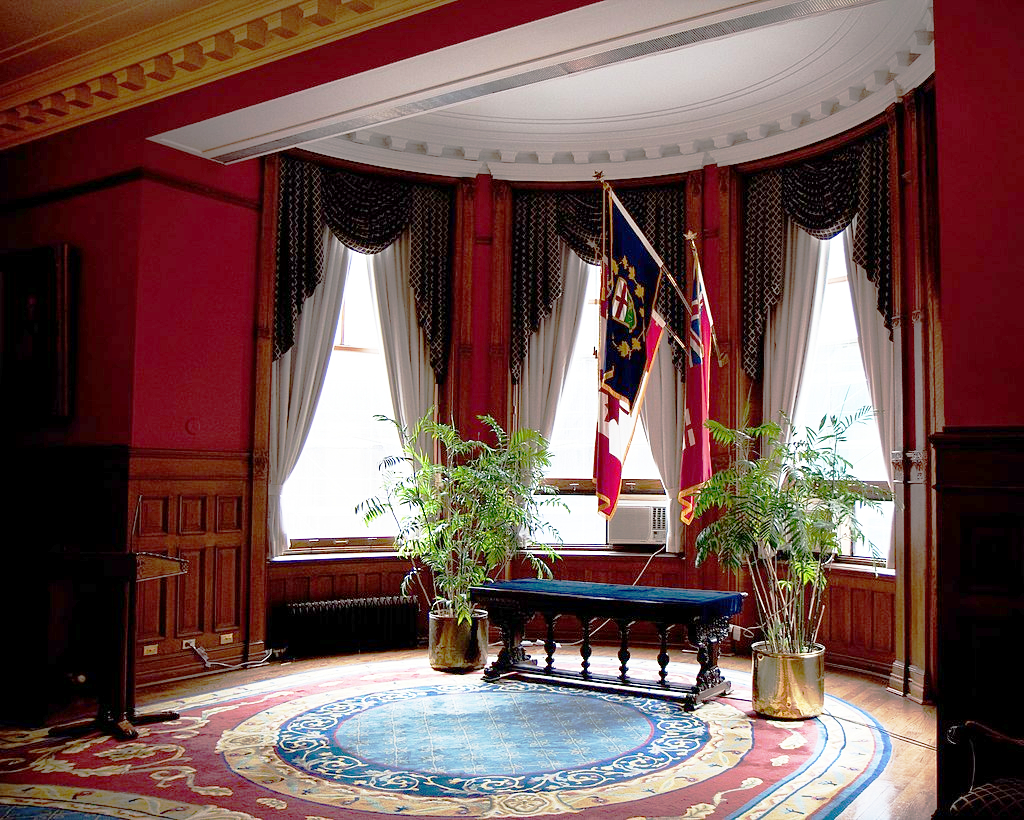
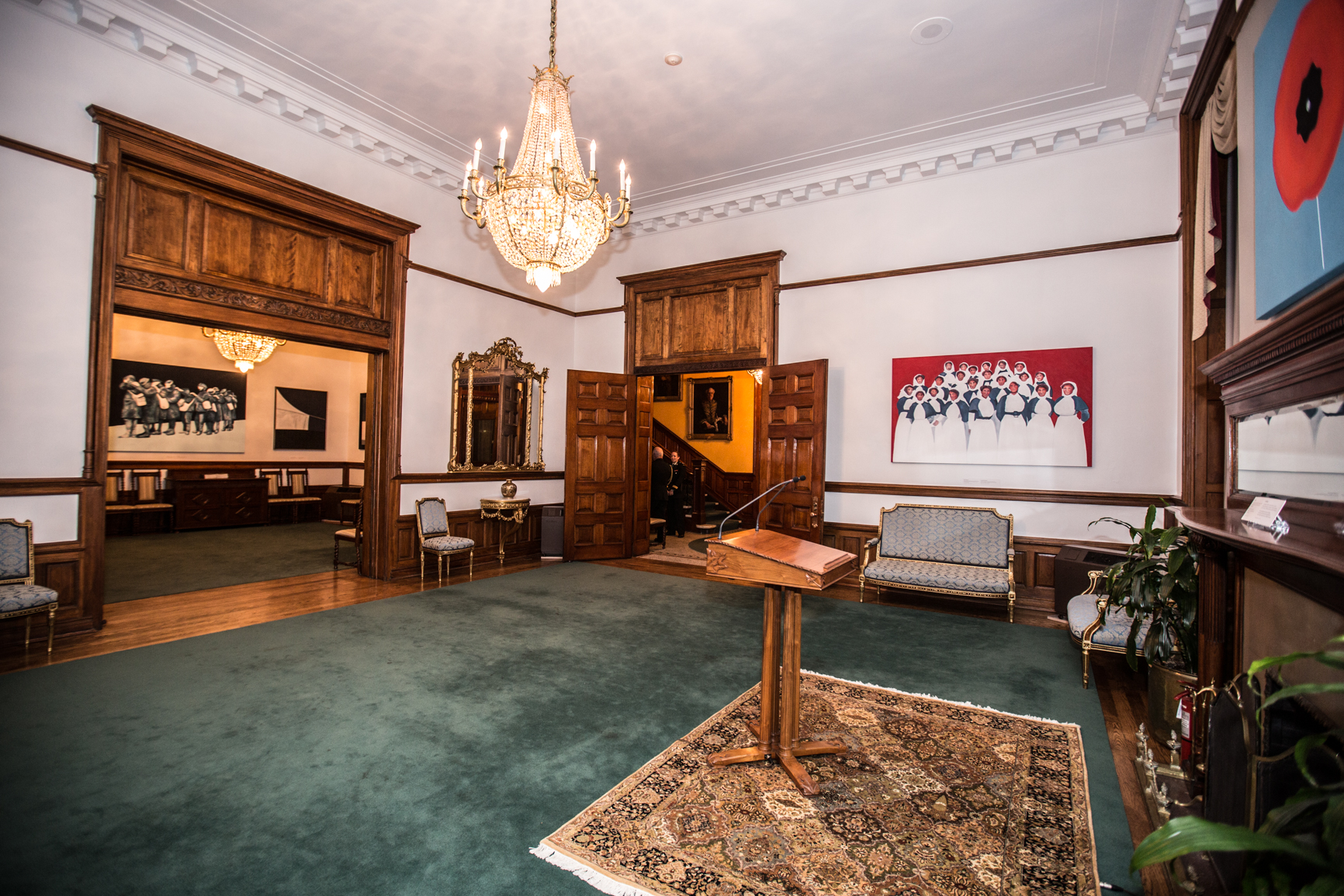
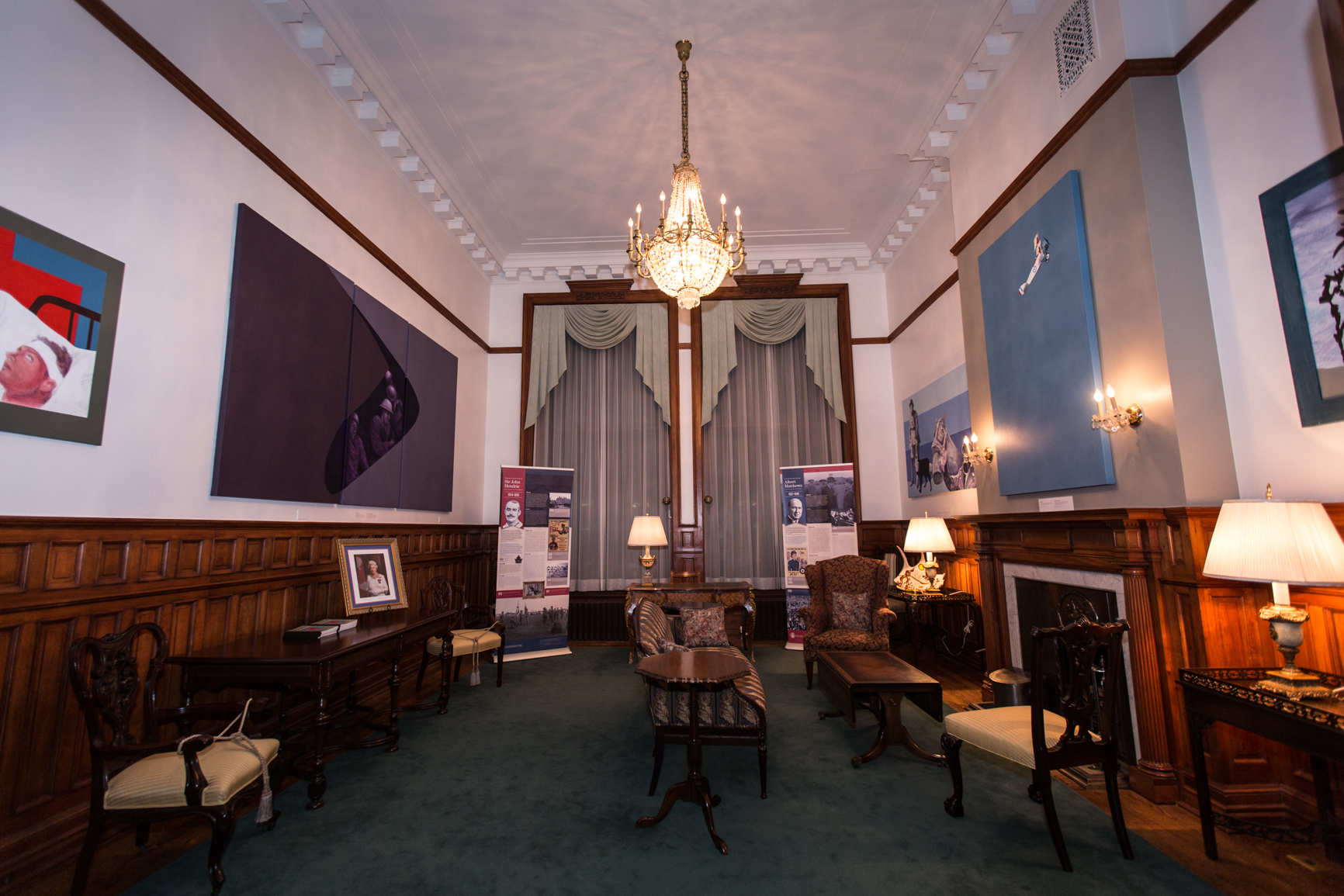
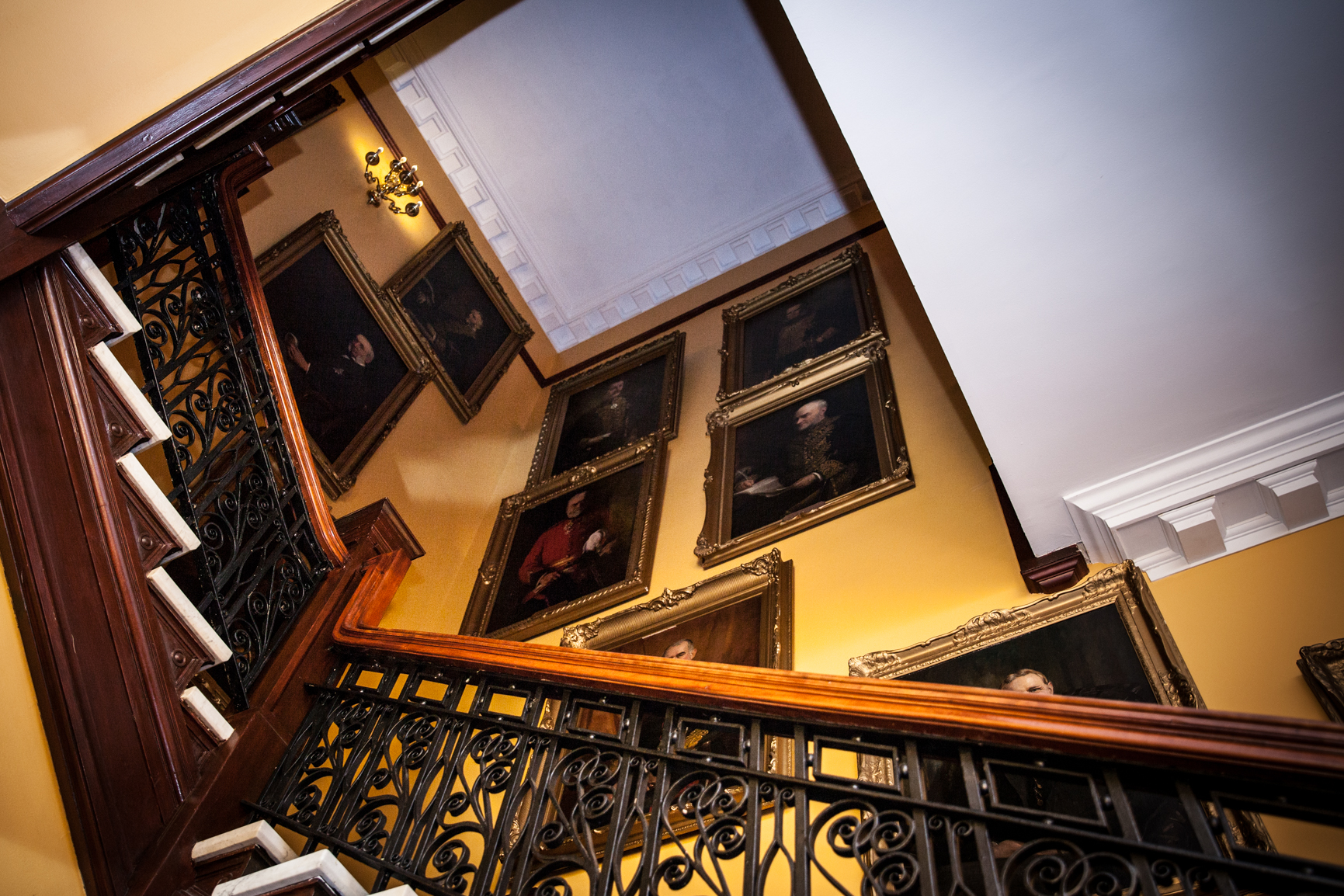
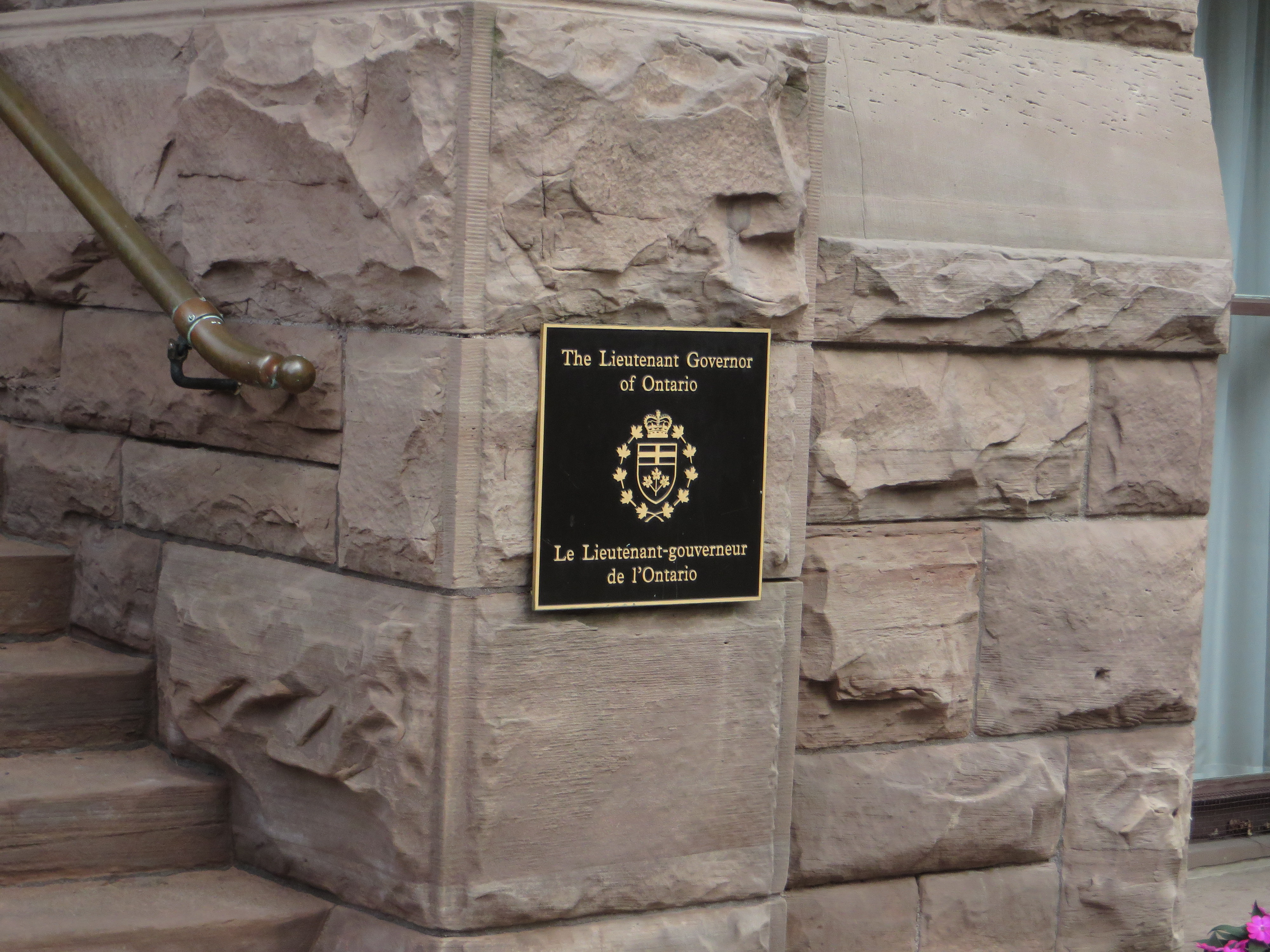
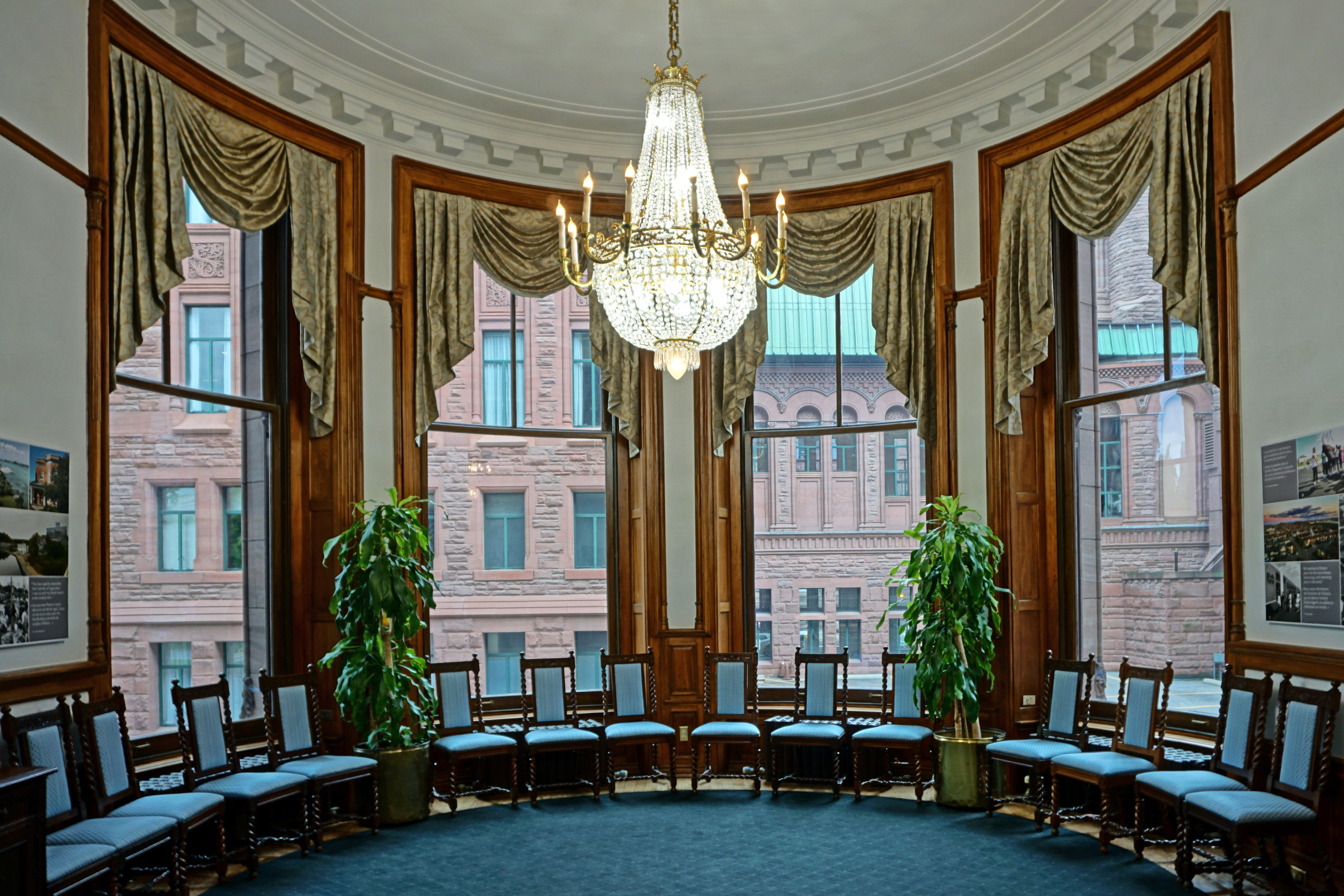
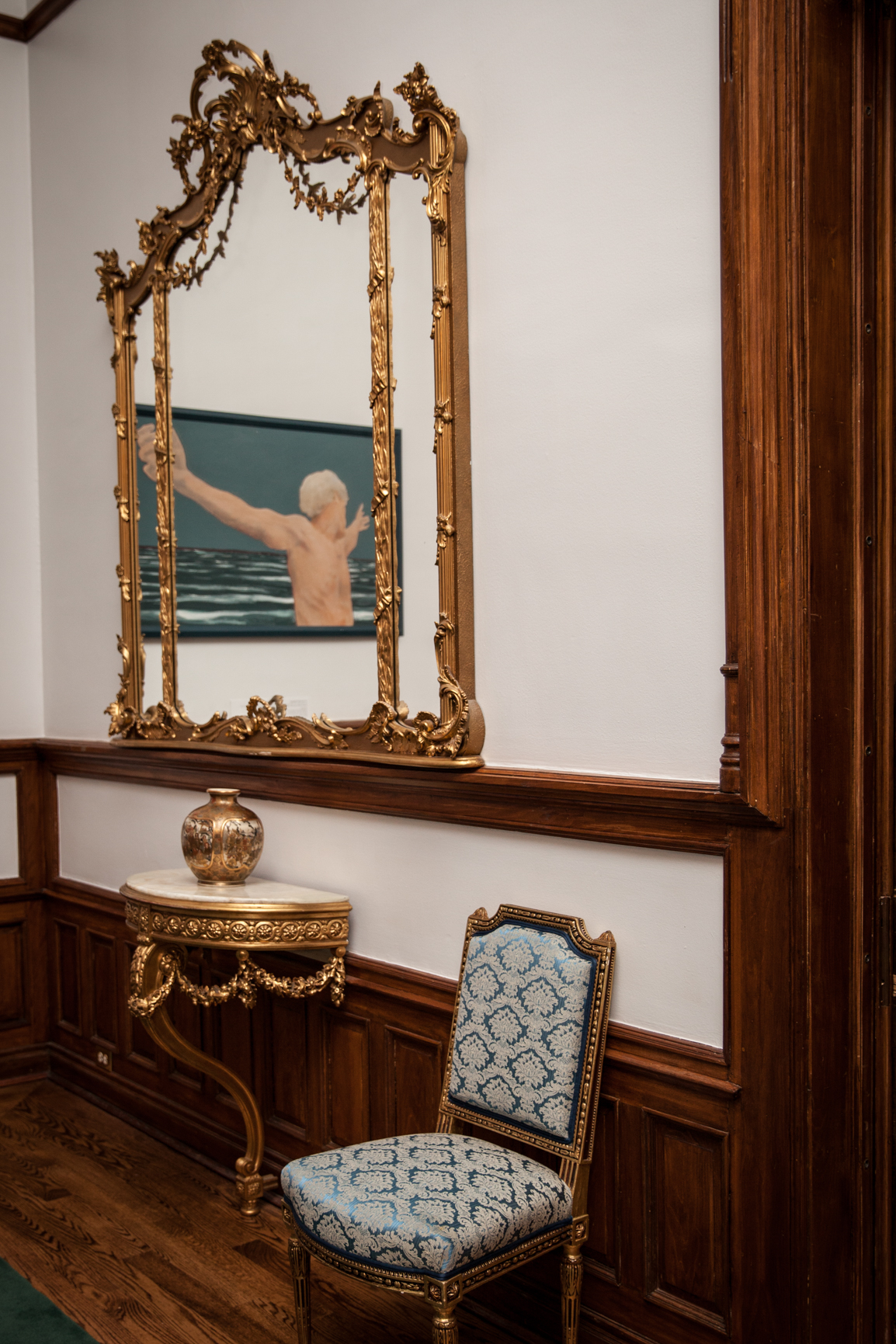
(left to right, top): Music Room; Dining Room; (middle) Large Salon; main staircase; (lower) Entrance plaque; Reception Room; frunishing from Chorley Park

At the north-west corner of the building is the Lieutenant Governor's Suite, which has housed the office of the lieutenant governor of Ontario since 1937, when the government of Ontario sold Government House to the federal government. The space was previously used as the Cabinet dining room and the speaker's apartment.

The suite is a three-storey complex, with its own ceremonial stairway and elevator entrances, where members of the Canadian royal family and visiting dignitaries are greeted. A rose garden, donated by the Monarchist League of Canada in honour of the Silver Jubilee of Elizabeth II in 1977, and added to for the Golden and Diamond Jubilees, sits across the driveway from the suite's entrance portico.

Inside are reception rooms, a state dining room, staff offices, and a kitchen, arranged around a central stair hall. The furnishings and chandeliers throughout the suite came from the last government house, Chorley Park, and paintings from the Government of Ontario Art Collection and the Toronto Public Library. The suite is also home to portraits of some past lieutenant governors (including a large rendition of Upper Canada's first lieutenant governor, John Graves Simcoe, painted by Edmund Wyly Grier and on loan from the Toronto Public Library), as well as of Elizabeth II, Queen of Canada, and Prince Philip, Duke of Edinburgh. Special art exhibitions are also commissioned from time to time.

The Music Room is the largest space in the viceregal suite and is the site of New Years' levées, swearing-in ceremonies for cabinet ministers, and presentations of, and investitures for, provincial honours.

== History ==
Locations and structures at a glance
Years	Location	Building & notes
1792-1796	Newark (Note: Present day Niagara-on-the-Lake)	Various mentioned, including: the Anchorage; Freemanson's Hall; Navy Hall (Note: Official residence of LG Simcoe)
1796-1813	Town of York (until 1834) Toronto	Palace of Parliament (Note: Destroyed on 27 April 1813 by arson by American soldiers); Front and Parliament Sts.
1814 (once)	Town of York (until 1834) Toronto	Jordan's York Holel; Between King and Front Sts. (Note: Present day location of Toronto Sun Building)
1815-1820	Town of York (until 1834) Toronto	The Lawn; Wellington and York Sts. (Note: Personal residence of Chief Justice William Henry Draper)
1820-1824	Town of York (until 1834) Toronto	Upper Canada's Second Parliament Building (Note: Destroyed by accidental fire on 30 December 1824); Same location as Palace of Parliament (Note: Structure located further northwest (King and Berkeley))
1825-1828	Town of York (until 1834) Toronto	The later York General Hospital (Note: Consequently delay the opening of the hospital); King and Hospital (Note: Present day Richmond Street) Sts.
1829-1832	Town of York (until 1834) Toronto	The former Court House; Bordered by King/Church/Court/Toronto Sts. (Note: South of present day location of the Courthouse Square Park)
1832-1840	Town of York (until 1834) Toronto	First Ontario Parliament Buildings (third for Upper Canada); Bordered by Front/John/Simcoe/Wellington Sts. (Note: Present day location of Metro Hall/CBC Broadcasting Centre)
1841-1843	Kingston	Government House (Alwington House) (Note: Destroyed later by fire in 1958 and demolished)
1844-1849	Montreal	Government House (the Monklands)
1849-1851	Toronto	First Ontario Parliament Buildings
1852-1855	Quebec City	Government House (Maison Sewell) (Note: Still standing, not to be confused with the Quebec's former Government House, known as Spencer Wood, which did not serve as Government House until 1870)
1855·1859	Toronto	First Ontario Parliament Buildings
1859·1866	Quebec City	Government House (Maison Sewell)
1861-1892	Toronto	First Ontario Parliament Buildings
1892·1964	Toronto	Queen's Park Building

=== Early structures ===
The present Ontario Legislative Building is the seventh such structure to serve as Ontario's parliament building. Either Navy Hall or the Freemasons Hall in Newark, Upper Canada (today Niagara-on-the-Lake, Ontario), served as the first legislature, where the initial meeting of the House of Assembly occurred on 17 September 1791.

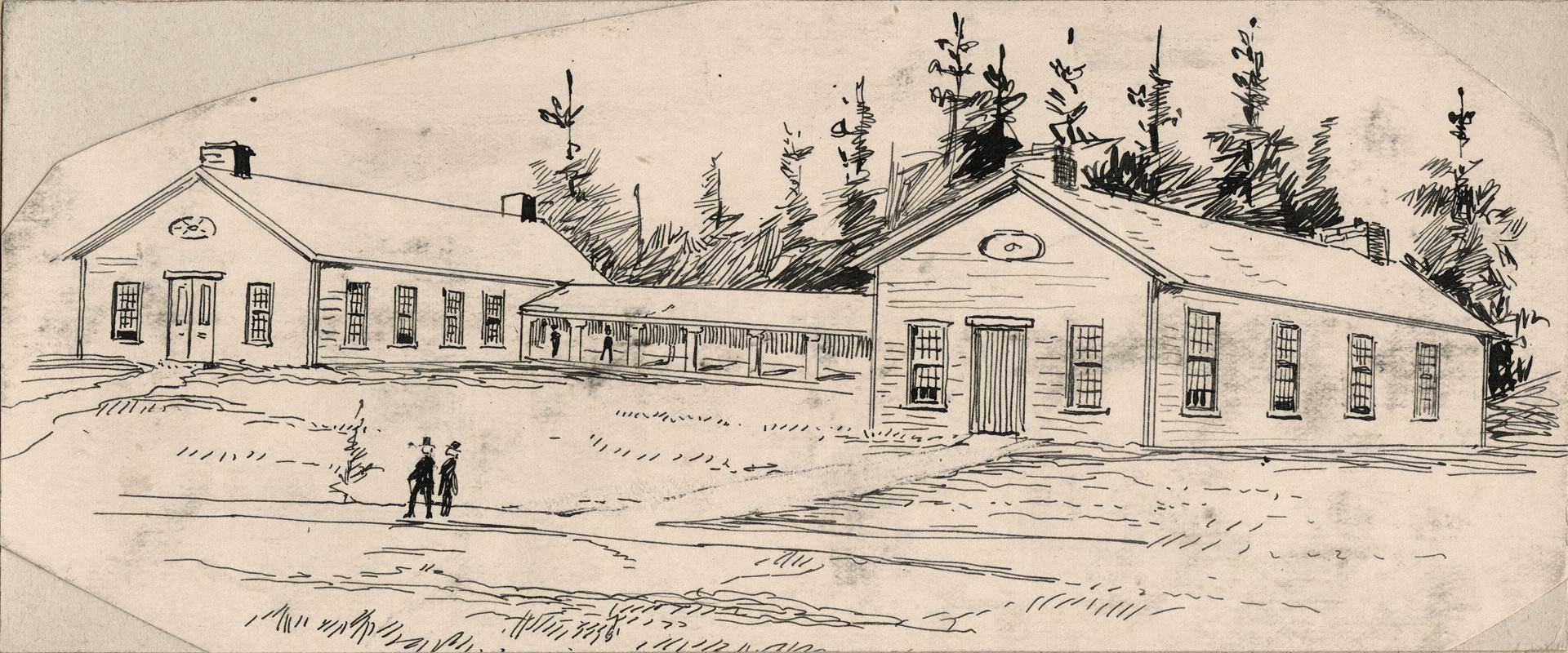
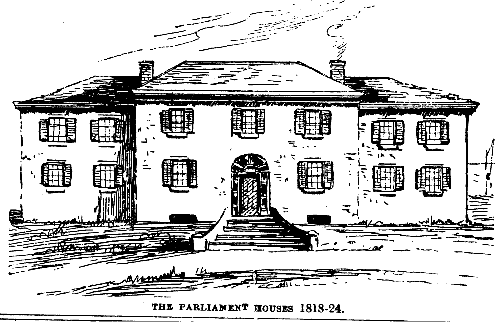
The first and second dedicated parliamentary buildings for the Legislature of Upper Canada, both located at Front and Parliament. The first was in use from 1794 to 1813, while the second was in use from 1820 to 1824

Only three years later, however, construction began on a dedicated parliament building in York (now Toronto), as it was felt by Lieutenant Governor John Graves Simcoe that the presence of a provincial capital directly across the border from the United States was too great a risk, especially as the relations between the US and Britain were then tense. By June the complex, located at the intersection of Front and Parliament Sts., was completed, and the humble wood structures were dubbed the Palace of Parliament (The structure resembled two military barracks). The relocation to York did not ensure the protection of the capital, however, and the Palace of Parliament was destroyed by fire on 27 April 1813, as a consequence of an attack on the city in the War of 1812. The House of Assembly then met once in the ballroom of the York Hotel (between King and Front Sts.), and regularly, from then until 1820, at the home of Chief Justice of the Court of the King's Bench William Henry Draper, which was located at the present intersection of Wellington and York Sts. The new parliament buildings was a two-storey Georgian architecture structure, put up on the site of the previous structure, stood only for four years, succumbing to an accidental fire on 30 December 1824. From then until 1829, the House of Assembly gathered at the newly built York General Hospital, located on the south-east corner of the block bounded by King, Adelaide, John, and Peter Sts.; a move that delayed the hospital's opening until the legislative body moved on to the old Court House, which stood on the north side of King Street, between Toronto and Church Sts.

=== First Ontario Parliament Buildings ===
In 1832, a new structure was built on Front Street, west of Simcoe Street, and served continuously as the third parliament building of Upper Canada until the province was united with Lower Canada in 1840, after which the joined assembly was relocated by the then Governor General, Charles Poulett Thomson, Baron Sydenham, to the general hospital building in Kingston. The House of Assembly moved in and out of the Front Street building over the ensuing years, relocating for brief periods to Montreal and Quebec City, even at one point adopting a perambulation system that saw parliament relocate between Toronto and Quebec every four years. With mounting displeasure over the transient nature of the Canadian parliament, and an inability on the part of politicians to agree as to where to locate the legislative building, Queen Victoria was asked to make a selection; over all the other cities in the Province of Canada, she chose Bytown (later Ottawa) in 1857.

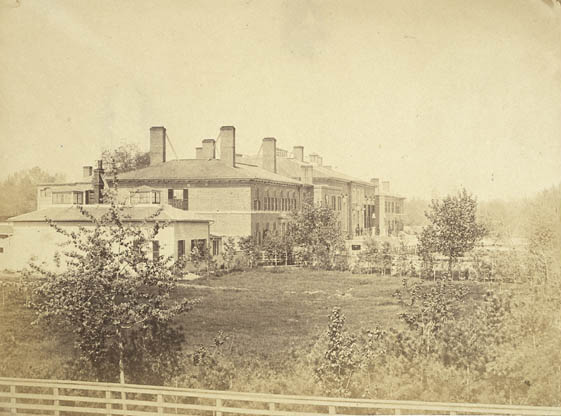
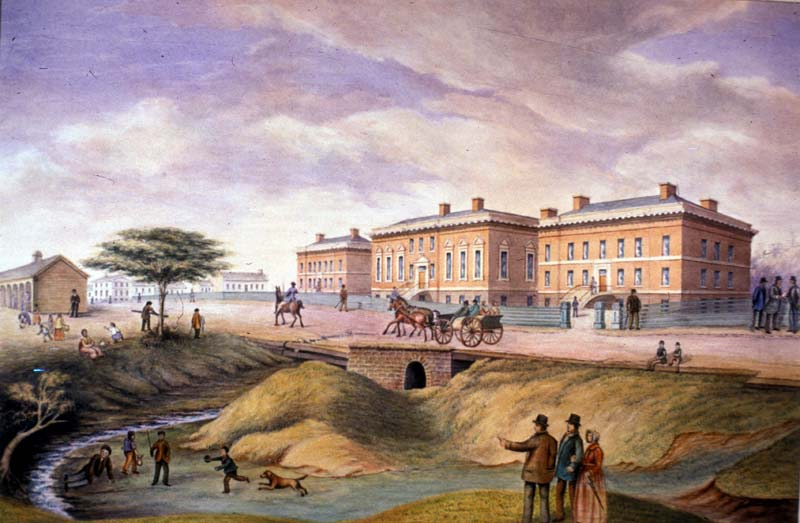
In 1832, the third parliament building for Upper Canada was completed. It was used by the legislature until 1840, when the colony united with Lower Canada to form the Province of Canada.

Today, the site of the first parliament buildings in York is a parking lot for a car wash, a car rental company and a car dealership. Archaeological excavations at the site in 2000 undercovered evidence of the buildings. Subsequently, the property was bought by the Ontario Heritage Trust which operated a Parliament Interpretive Centre at the site from 2012 to 2015. The dig was covered up to await future plans for the site.

On 1 July 1867, however, the province joined with two others in confederation and was split into the present-day provinces of Ontario and Quebec, meaning that new legislatures were established for each of the two new provincial entities. Toronto was chosen as the capital of the former, and the legislative assembly moved back to the same Front Street property that had been home to the House of Assembly for the Province of Canada, despite the structure having been damaged by fire in 1861 and 1862.

=== Queen's Park Building ===
By 1880, a request was made for designs for a new parliament building for the province of Ontario, and, when none of the entries was found to be less than CA$500,000, the legislature approved during 1885 a budget of CA$750,000 for the chosen scheme by Richard A. Waite.

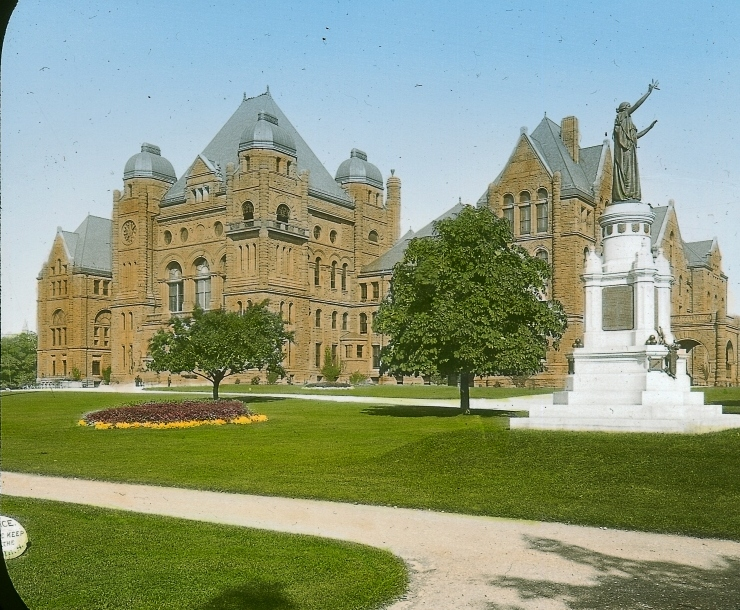
Queen's Park and Ontario Legislative Building, c. 1890s. The building was officially opened in 1893.

Construction then commenced in 1886, and the Ontario Legislative Building was (though still incomplete) officially opened on 4 April 1893, by the then Lieutenant Governor of Ontario, George Airey Kirkpatrick. The final cost was tallied at approximately CA$1,250,000, and the design was criticised by some as "too American". This left the old parliament building on Front Street vacant, and it stood as such for nearly a decade before it was demolished from 1900 to 1903. The site was then sold to the Grand Trunk Railway, which used the former parliamentary land for freight sheds and marshalling yards. The location is now occupied by the Canadian Broadcasting Centre, a public square, and a number of high-rise buildings.

With an increasing population in the province, it became necessary in 1909 to add a wing to the north side of the Ontario Legislative Building, enclosing the courtyard. As construction was underway, on 1 September men repairing galvanised roofing on the west wing accidentally sparked a fire that eventually destroyed the interior of that part of the edifice, including the legislative library. It then took until 1912 for repairs and reconstructions to be made, and the new wing to be completed. Further expansions of the parliamentary infrastructure were from then on built across the east side of Queen's Park Crescent, with the Whitney Block built in 1925, the Macdonald and Hepburn Blocks completed in 1968, the Mowat and Hearst Blocks in 1969.

=== State of Disrepair, Planned Renovation and Decanting Process ===
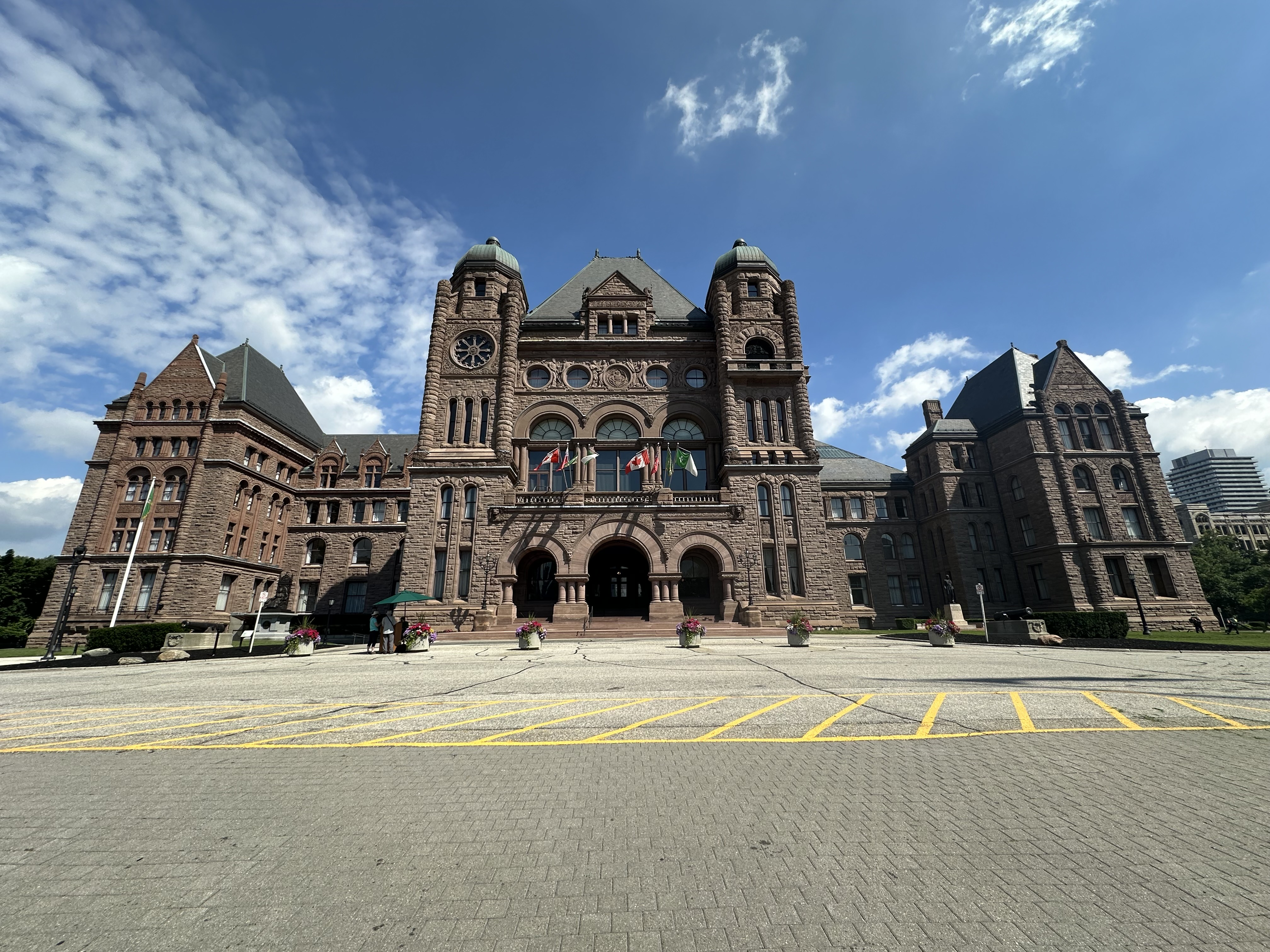
View of the front of the Ontario Legislative Building in July 2024

In the early 2010s, a report found that the building and its infrastructure were in need of repair. Since its construction in 1893, the Main Legislative Building has "only undergone piecemeal repairs" and upgrades, leaving "critical building systems...at risk of total failure" according to Government Press Releases. The infrastructure issues within the building include poor ventilation, the widespread presence of asbestos, not enough emergency exits to comply with fire codes, undrinkable tap water due to lead pipes, exposed wiring, and "mechanical systems that are close to, or already, failing." There are also not enough "sprinkler systems, and unprotected openings in the ceilings and walls could allow smoke and fire to easily spread between floors."

In order to fix the "hazardous and severely deficient" conditions within the Main Legislative Building, a renovation requiring the full decamp of the staff and MPPs who currently work within the Legislative Building to an alternate location (similar to the renovation currently underway at Parliament Hill in Ottawa) is being planned, with a projected timeline of 10 years to complete once started and at a projected cost of more than a billion dollars. In March 2023, the Queen's Park Restoration Secretariat was created by the governing Progressive Conservative Government to lead this planning, working with the Legislature's Procedure and House Affairs Committee. However, the plans to temporarily and completely close the building have been slowed by the problems inherent to the building's role, location, and historical significance. It has been estimated that any alternative site chosen must have at least 500,000 square feet of space to house the hundreds of offices which are currently within the Legislative Building, not to mention an additional 5,000 square feet of space to house the Legislative Chamber where MPPs meet to debate. Not only that, but the temporary lodgings will need to remain in the Downtown Area, as various Ministry and Ontario Government Offices are scattered in buildings throughout the area around Queen's Park, including but not limited to the Whitney Block, which is directly adjacent to the Legislative Building, and the Macdonald Block, which is currently in the midst of its own 1.5 billion dollar renovation which is behind schedule. Moreover, a portion of the TTC's Line 1 Subway runs directly under the Legislative Building and Grounds, and there is presumed to be "abandoned and unknown" infrastructure that lies below the building. Finally, the building's history means there are a "multitude of exterior considerations for the project." There are more than 30 statues, monuments and plaques on the grounds, as well as three Japanese cherry trees, which were a gift from the Japanese Consulate in Toronto in 2005.

Due to these issues, the original goal of closing the building for the renovation by 2026 has been pushed back to at least 2028, and the former Minister formerly in charge of the project was quoted in March 2024 saying "the more you dig into it, the more comes up." According to a member of the Legislature's Procedure and House Affairs Committee involved in the planning of the renovation, a potential temporary relocation site has been identified and negotiations are underway, though the potential location has been kept secret.

== Security ==
Security within the Legislative grounds is provided by the Legislative Protective Service (LPS), under the direction of the Sergeant-at-Arms. In 2016, in response to the 2014 Parliament Hill Attack, then-Speaker Dave Levac announced the establishment of an Armed Response Unit within the Legislative Security Service (the precursor to the LPS), and some members were armed with handguns.

At present, the LPS consists of Protective Service Officers and Peace Officers who provide a full range of in-house security services to the Legislative Precinct. Protective Service Officers are detection and screening specialists who maintain a safe and secure environment within the Legislative Precinct and ensure that all visitors are screened before entering. Peace Officers of the LPS are responsible for the safety and security of MPPs, Legislative Assembly employees, visitors to the Legislature and the Precinct itself. LPS Peace Officers are armed and have full policing powers, enabling them to enforce legislation such as the Highway Traffic Act, the Provincial Offences Act, and the Criminal Code of Canada, and are subject to the mandate of the Special Investigations Unit.

In early 2021, a new Visitors' Centre located at the southwest side of the Assembly building was completed, acting as a single, accessible point of entry for all visitors to be screened before entering the building.

== See also ==
- First Ontario Parliament Buildings
- List of oldest buildings and structures in Toronto
