= Macdonald Block Complex =

Provincial government office block, Toronto, Ontario, Canada

Coordinates: 43.663924°N 79.387679°W

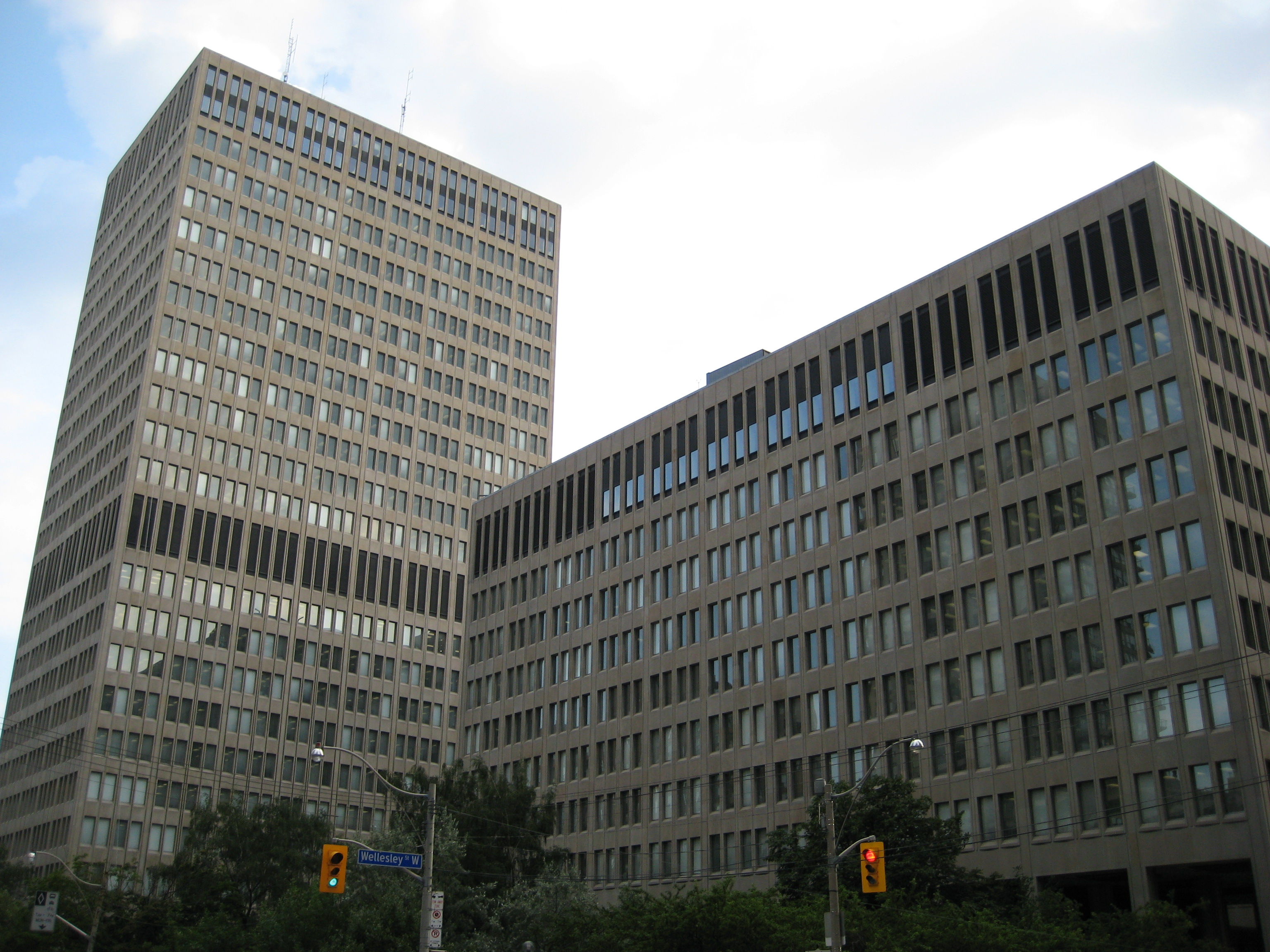
Two of the buildings of the complex: Mowat (left) and Hearst (right) Blocks

The Macdonald Block Complex is an office complex in Toronto, Ontario, Canada that houses various offices of the Government of Ontario and the largest concentration of Ontario public servants. Named after the first Ontario Premier John Sandfield Macdonald, it is located at the southwest corner of Bay Street and Wellesley Street, a short walking distance east of the Ontario Legislative Building located at Queen's Park.

== Function and Layout ==
Given its close proximity to the legislature, the complex houses the offices of the ministers and senior civil servants of about half of the Ontario government ministries. Designed in the International Style by Shore Tilbe Henschel Irwin Architects and Engineers (now Shore Tilbe Irwin + Partners), it has a total building area of approximately 1.7 million square feet across five interconnected buildings:

- The Ferguson Block, a 14-storey building named after Conservative Premier George H. Ferguson (1923-30), and is located at 77 Wellesley Street West
- The Hearst Block, a 10-storey building named after Conservative Premier William Howard Hearst (1914-19)
- The Hepburn Block: a 14-storey building named after Liberal Premier Mitchell Hepburn (1934-42)
- The Mowat Block: a 24-storey building named after Liberal Premier Sir Oliver Mowat (1872-96), Ontario longest serving premier and later Lieutenant Governor (1897-1903)
- The Macdonald Block, a podium that connects the four towers along the first two storeys of each, and also an indoor bridge to the first floor of Whitney Block from its second storey.

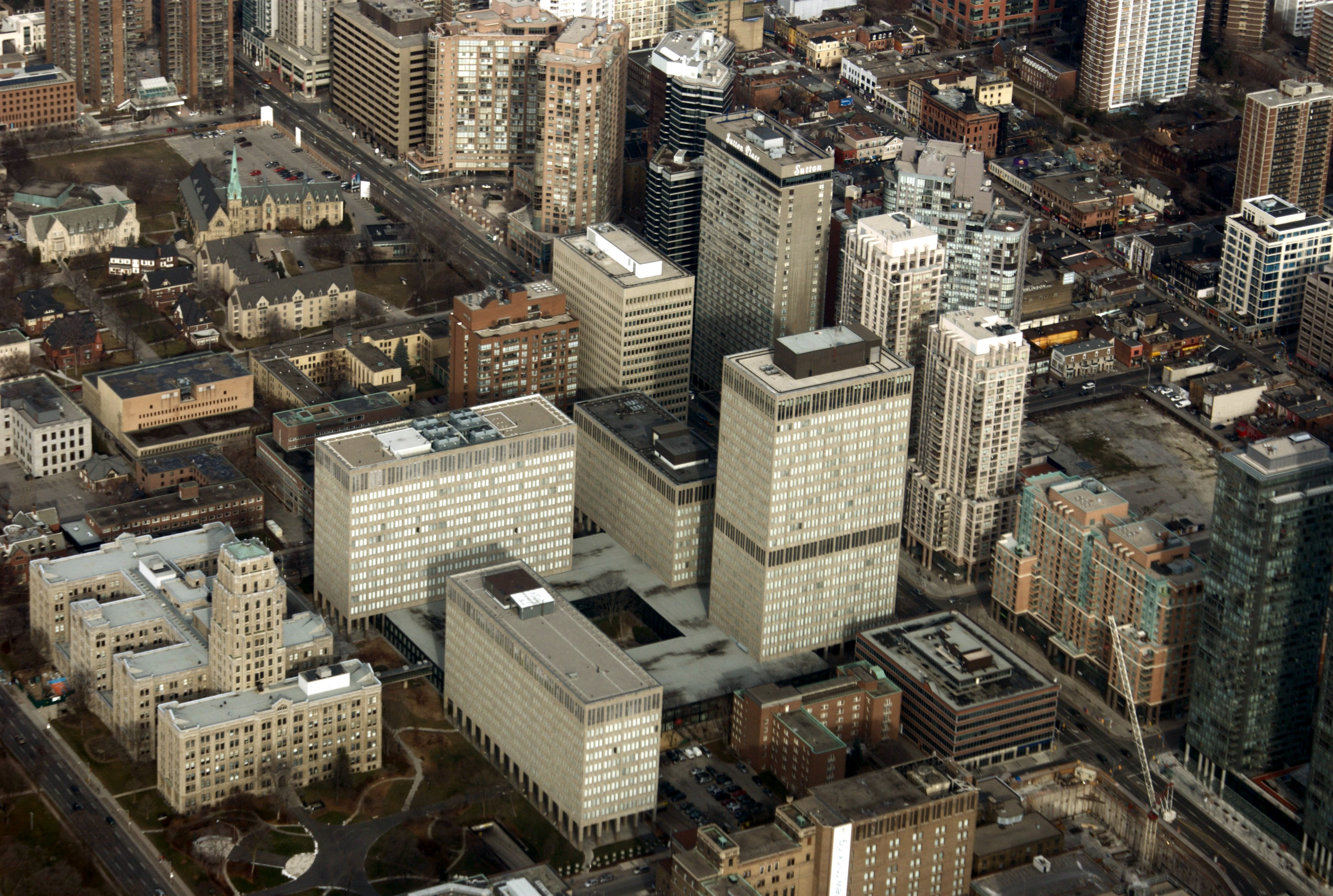
The Whitney Block (left) and the (clockwise from top left) Ferguson, Hearst, Mowat, and Hepburn Blocks, with the two-storey Macdonald Block connecting the four together.

== History ==
The complex was completed in 1971.

The massive construction site for the Macdonald Block was the filming location for Buster Keaton's last film, "The Reporter", an industrial safety short that was released under the title The Scribe.

In July 2016, the Government of Ontario announced an eight-year reconstruction project of the entire complex. Adamson Associates Architects served as the planning, design and compliance architect for the project. The complex was closed for the reconstruction in 2019, with all government offices temporarily relocated to commercial office buildings throughout downtown Toronto.

== Nearby government buildings ==
Other government buildings nearby include:

- Whitney Block
- Ontario Power Building
- Frost Building
