= Macdonald Block (Victoria, British Columbia) =

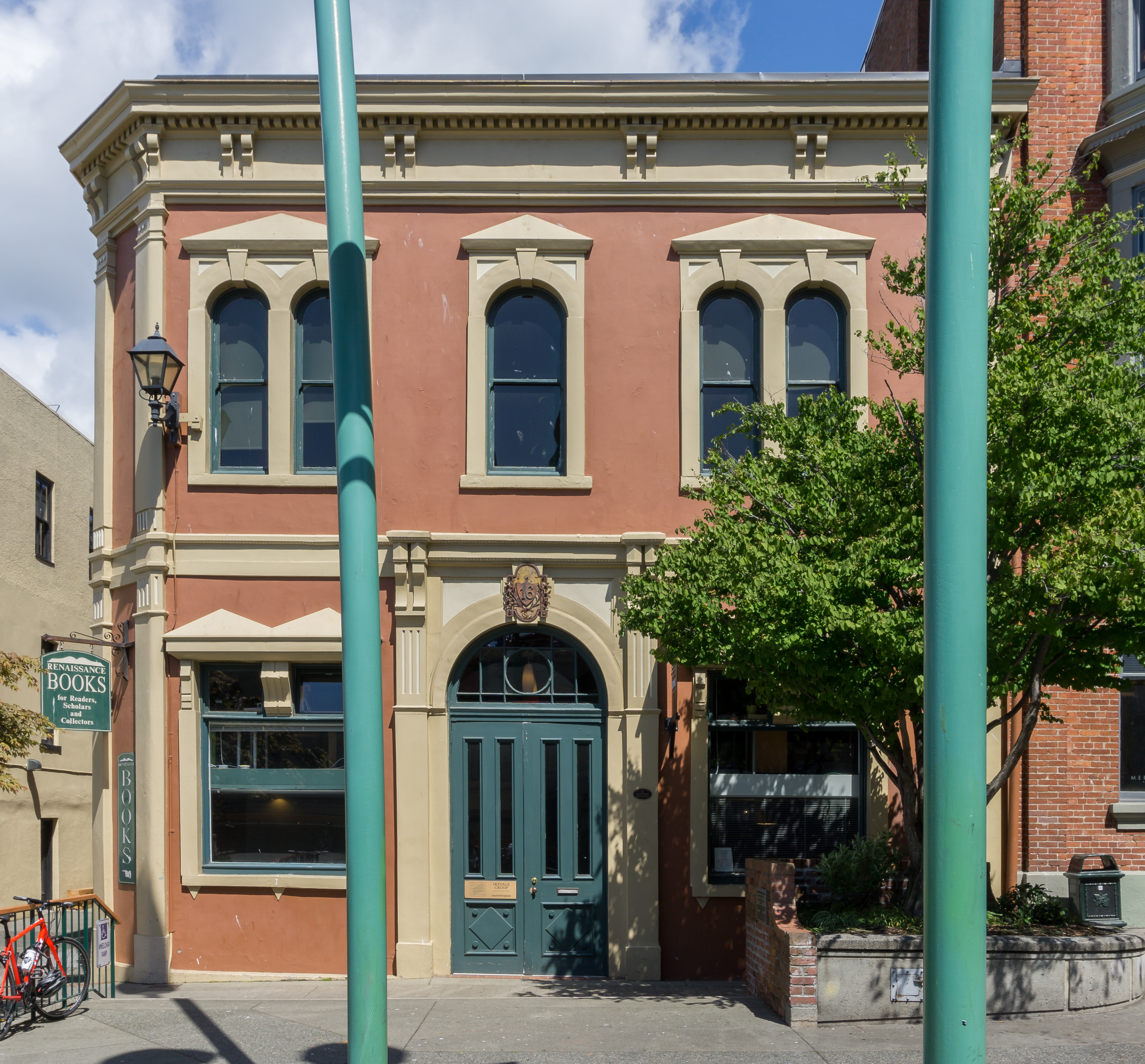
- The building's exterior in 2018
- Interactive map of the Macdonald Block area

General information
- Location: 12 - 16 Bastion Square, Victoria, British Columbia, Canada
- Coordinates: 48°25′34.266″N 123°22′9.797″W

Macdonald Block is an historic building in Victoria, British Columbia, Canada.

== See also ==
- List of historic places in Victoria, British Columbia
