= Shore Tilbe Perkins+Will =

Architecture firm

- Industry: Architecture
- Founded: 1945; 81 years ago (as Shore and Moffat)
- Headquarters: Toronto, Ontario, Canada
- Key people: Stephen Irwin; D'Arcy Arthurs; Andrew Frontini; Duff Balmer; Brian Aitken; Stephen Ploeger; David Mitchell
- Website: www.stipartners.com

Shore Tilbe Perkins+Will, formerly Shore Tilbe Irwin & Partners (STIP), is a Canadian architecture firm based in Toronto, Ontario. Since its founding as Shore and Moffat in 1945, and later as Shore Tilbe Irwin & Partners, the firm has completed numerous buildings, complexes and master plans across Canada, as well as at locations in the United States and Bermuda. From early educational and residential projects, the firm rose to prominence in the early 1950s, winning Governor General's Medals in Architecture and commissions from the government of Ontario for departmental buildings, and it went on to design prominent landmarks such as Purdy's Wharf in Halifax, Nova Scotia, and the redesign of Nathan Phillips Square in Toronto. The firm's scope today mostly encompasses community centres, libraries, pharmaceutical laboratories, offices and university teaching buildings, although the firm has also completed religious spaces, corporate interiors and public plazas.

== History ==
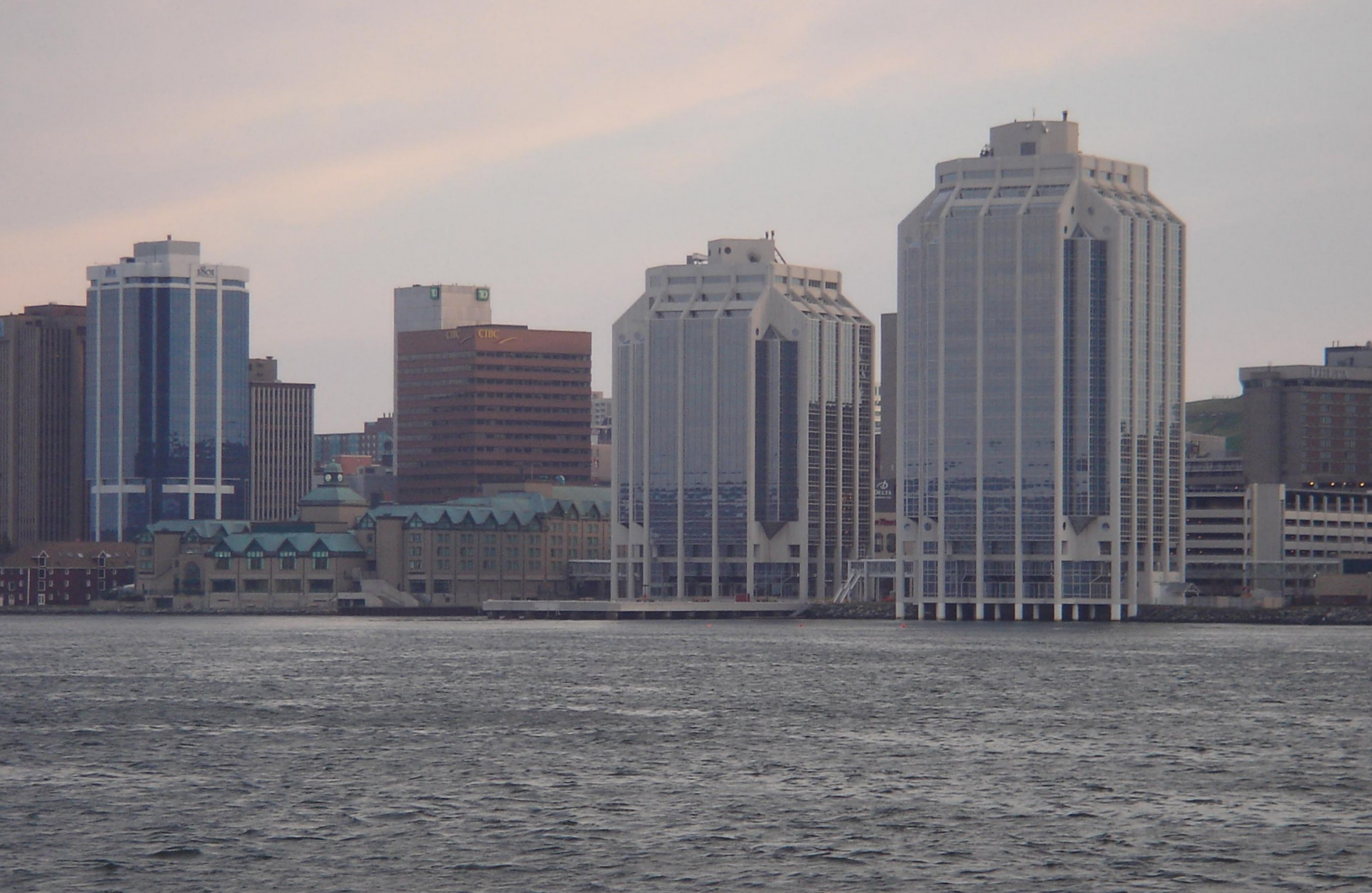
Purdy's Wharf in Halifax, Nova Scotia, designed by STIP in 1989.

Founded as Shore and Moffat by Leonard Shore and Bob Moffat in 1945, the first project completed was the Meaford Public School in Meaford, Ontario. After the completion of some small-scale residential and commercial projects, the two partners received their first large commission in 1947 from the Ontario Food Terminal Board in Toronto.

By the early 1950s, the firm had expanded to take on 10 employees, including Alfred Tilbe. Schools and other educational buildings supplied most of the work, and the firm completed Brock High School, Goderich Collegiate, Stayner Collegiate and Collingwood Collegiate. Shore and Moffat designed the York Township Municipal Offices in 1952, which won them the Massey Medal. They also submitted a proposal for the Toronto City Hall international competition, which was ultimately unsuccessful. The later part of the decade brought three significant projects: the William Lyon Mackenzie Building, which was to be the second-largest building in Toronto at the time, the Union Carbide Head Office, and the Imperial Oil Research Centre. The latter building won Shore and Moffat another Massey Medal and launched the firm into the research field, bringing them projects for Petro Canada, Royal Dutch Shell and Teck Cominco. By 1959, the firm had expanded to 40 staff, and was now providing engineering services as well.

In terms of design credentials, the Union Carbide Building was a significant project for the firm. Built near the intersection of Yonge Street and Eglinton Avenue, it was one of the first corporate headquarters built north of the downtown core. Said of it: "While one may not agree on its historicity, one can't dismiss the fact that the Union Carbide building is unique, both structurally and aesthetically. It was engineered in such a way that its weight is supported entirely by its outside columns; uncluttered by posts, these airy interiors could be easily adapted to different needs. The builders chose to give the building an interesting mix of materials; granite, nickel and stainless steel creating a countenance full of dignity and character. Equally significant was that Union Carbide was one of north Toronto's first major corporate headquarters." It was demolished in July 1999, an act lamented by the Toronto Star architecture critic, Christopher Hume.

In 1960, Bob Moffat died, and the firm of 150 was renamed Shore and Moffat and Partners. Projects included the master plans for the University of Waterloo and the York University campuses, as well as the National Research Science Library and the Alexander Campbell Building in Ottawa. Schools remained a staple source of income, however, into the 1970s demand for their construction was declining, and thus Shore and Moffat turned its focus elsewhere. The partners at the time, Len Shore, Art Henschel and Alf Tilbe, hired Stephen Irwin, appointed him partner, and changed the firm name to Shore Tilbe Henschel Irwin Architects and Engineers. Irwin's designs at this time included 52 Division Police Station in Toronto, the Xerox Research Centre, and the Kortright Centre. Within a few years the firm changed the company name to Shore Tilbe Henschel Irwin and Peters when Dennis Peters was brought aboard as a partner.

With the award-winning design of the North York YMCA by Terry Fitsialos in 1979, Shore Tilbe Henschel Irwin and Peters' long relationship with the YMCA began. Fitsialos, an associate at the time, became a partner in 1986. Other buildings designed by the firm during this time were H.J.A. Brown Education Centre, Peel Regional Police Headquarters, and the post-modern Metropolitan Toronto Police Headquarters.

Leonard Shore died in 1989, and as he had no immediate family, the Shore Foundation was created in his memory to assist the University of Toronto, and the L.E. Shore Memorial Library in Thornbury, Ontario. In early 1990, partners Arthur Herschel and Dennis Peters retired, and Brian Aitken and David Mitchell were made partners. The firm's name changed once again to Shore Tilbe Irwin & Partners. The scope of work expanded again to include extended care, academic facilities, pharmaceutical laboratories and recreational architecture. During this time, the L.E Shore Library was completed, as well as the Mississauga Public Library. In 1999, Alfred Tilbe died.

Even though STIP continued to win awards, the firm was seen as coasting on its reputation, failing to provide forward-looking design and planning, and faced the danger of becoming simply a drawing production office.

The new millennium brought about dramatic changes within the STIP's structure and direction, which was spearheaded by D'Arcy Arthurs. In 2000, the firm saw the expansion of Shore Tilbe Irwin & Partner's in-house interior design department and then in 2002 the addition of Andrew Frontini to the firm's team. Frontini became partner in 2005. Under Frontini's direction, the Whitby Public Library and Civic Square was completed and featured in, and on, the cover of Canadian Architect magazine. This project was hailed as marking Shore Tilbe's turning point. Frontini also designed the Hazel McCallion Academic Learning Centre at the University of Toronto Mississauga. Duff Balmer, the designer of the Angus Glen Community Centre in Markham, Ontario, was also an integral part of the renaissance at STIP. Balmer is credited as the lead designer on the Health and Wellness Centre at U of T Mississauga; the former winning the National Post/Design Exchange Silver Award in 2005.

In joint venture with Kohn Shnier Architects (KSa), STIP completed the award-winning renovations to the E.J. Pratt Library at Victoria University at U of T St. George. John Potter, who led the KSa team on the Pratt Library project, went on to join STIP in 2006. Another notable project was the Canadian National Institute for the Blind Headquarters in Toronto, done in joint venture with Sterling Finlayson Architects (currently Sweeny Sterling Finlayson &Co Architects Inc. as a result of a 2005 merger).

Environmental sustainability has become more and more prevalent in STIP's designs, demonstrated in the greenhouse gas reduction technology used in the Fathom Five National Marine Park/Bruce Peninsula National Park visitors' centre, The Wellness Centre at U of T Mississauga also incorporated green roofs, one of which was intended for use by the biology department. The Hazel McCallion Academic Learning Centre was the first project at the University of Toronto to achieve LEED Certification. STIP is currently working on a number of projects aiming for LEED Gold Certification including the London Community Recreation Centre & Library and the East Markham Community Centre & Library.

On March 8, 2007, it was announced at Toronto City Hall that STIP, along with PLANT Architect, had been awarded the $40 million redesign of the iconic Nathan Phillips Square.

In February 2010, Shore Tilbe Irwin & Partners merged with Chicago-based Perkins&Will to form Shore Tilbe Perkins+Will. In May 2011, the firm merged with Ottawa-based Vermeulen Hind Architects and, together with Vancouver-based Busby Perkins+Will, the three rebranded to form Perkins+Will Canada, a unified national practice.

== Partners, associates, and key staff ==
Partners

- Stephen Irwin
- D'Arcy Arthurs
- Duff Balmer
- Brian Aitken
- Stephen Ploeger
- David Mitchell

Associates

- Phil Fenech
- Jan-Willem Gritters
- Alan Mortsch
- Frank Park
- Linda Neumayer
- Werner Sommer

Interior design

- Liz Livingston
- Diana Shams

== Projects ==
A gallery of some of STIP's recent projects:

Grimsby Public Library and Art Gallery
Grimsby, Ontario
2004

Peterborough Sport and Wellness Centre
Peterborough, Ontario
2005

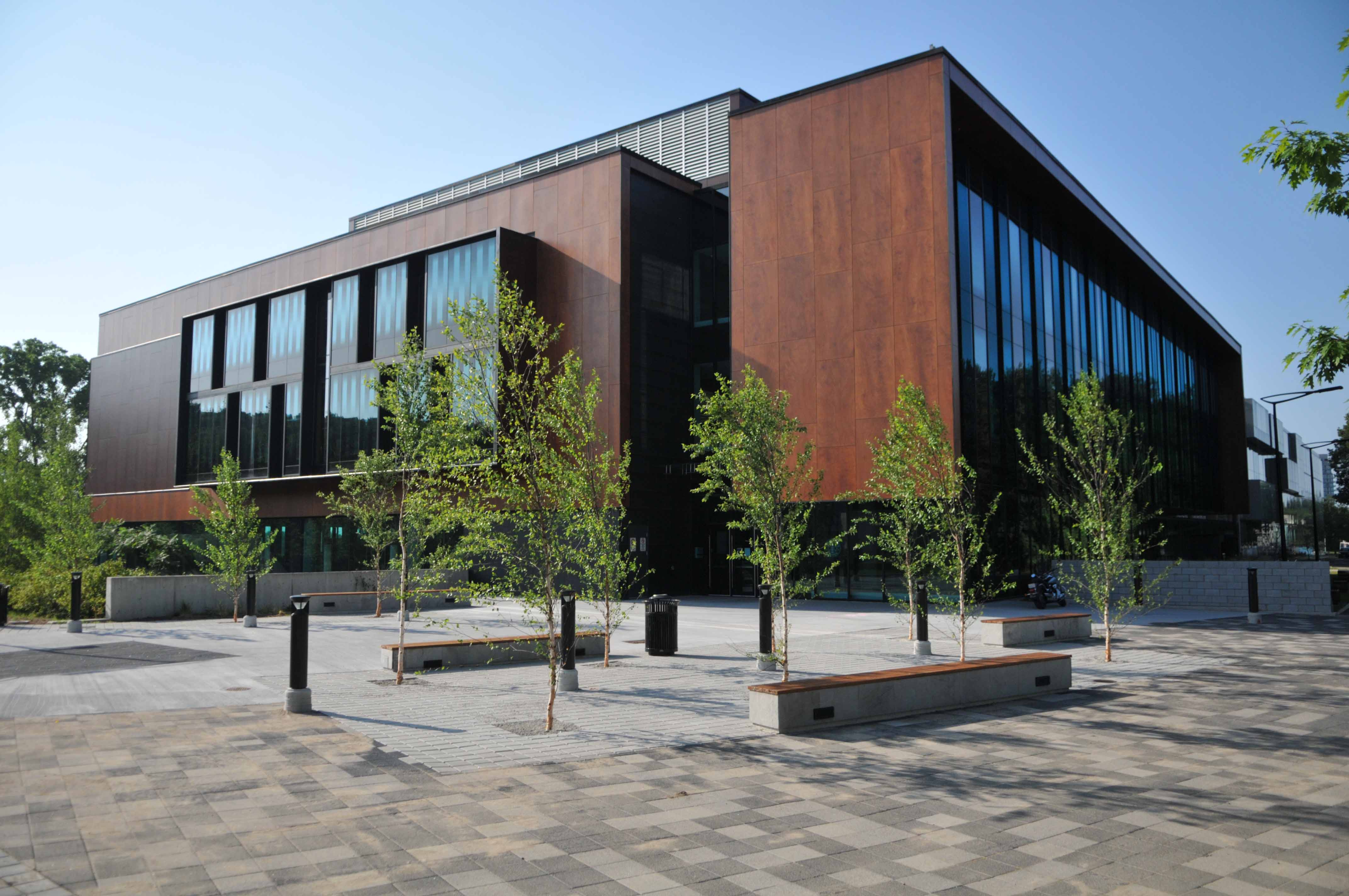
Hazel McCallion Academic Learning Centre at U of T, Ontario
2006

Brief list of some of STIP's other projects:

Year	Building	Image & info
1956	Burnhamthorpe Collegiate Institute	
1958	Union Carbide Building	@ Emporis Buildings
1960	30 Adelaide Street East	@ Emporis Buildings
1967	McLennan Physical Laboratories	@ Emporis Buildings
1969	Mowat Block	@ Emporis Buildings
1969	Ferguson Block	@ Emporis Buildings
1977	Joseph Sheppard Federal Building	@ Emporis Buildings
1988	Metropolitan Toronto Police Headquarters	@ Emporis Buildings
1994	180 Simcoe Street	@ Emporis Buildings
1999	Eglinton Spectrum Public School	-
2001	Steeles Technology Campus	@ Emporis Buildings
2004	CNIB Headquarters	-
2006	Recreation, Athletics and Wellness Centre, University of Toronto Mississauga	-
2006	Hazel McCallion Academic Learning Centre, University of Toronto Mississauga	-

== Awards ==
Year	Award	Level	Building
1964	OMRC Award for outstanding design and masonry workmanship	-	B/A Engine Testing Laboratory
1965	OMRC Award for outstanding design and masonry workmanship	-	Consolidated Mining Product Research Laboratory
1966	OMRC Award for outstanding design and masonry workmanship	-	Steacic Science Library
1968	OMRC Award for outstanding design and masonry workmanship	-	University of Waterloo Central Services Building
1969	OMRC Award for outstanding design and masonry workmanship	-	McLaughlin College, York University
1978	Habitation Space International Award	-	-
1980	Habitation Space International Award	-	-
1981	Habitation Space International Award	-	-
1981	Mississauga Urban Design Award	-	Gulf Oil High Bay Warehouse
1983	Mississauga Urban Design Award	-	Allelix Inc. Biotechnology Laboratory
1984	Mississauga Urban Design Award	-	Xerox Research Centre
1984	Mississauga Urban Design Award	Citation	H.J.A. Brown Education Centre
1986	Mississauga Urban Design Award	Citation	H.J.A Brown Education Centre
1989	Ontario Association of Architects Design Excellence Award	-	Xerox Research Centre
1989	Ontario Association of Architects Design Excellence Award	-	H.J.A. Brown Education Centre
1991	Mississauga Urban Design Award	Award of Excellence	Mississauga Central Library and Civic Square
1993	Mississauga Urban Design Award	Award of Excellence	Hewlett-Packard Canadian Head Office
1996	Canadian Architect Award of Excellence	-	-
1996	Ontario Association of Architects 25 Year Award	-	Union Carbide Building
1997	Ontario Library Association Library Design Award	-	Leonard E. Shore Memorial Library
2000	Toronto Urban Design Award	Honourable Mention	Eglinton Spectrum Public School
2000	Mississauga Urban Design Award	Millennium Design Icon	Mississauga Civic Centre and Library
2000	Mississauga Urban Design Award	Millennium Design Icon	Xerox Research Centre
2001	Mississauga Urban Design Award	Award of Merit	Erin Mills Multi-use Complex
2002	Oakville Urban Design Award	Award of Excellence	Oakville YMCA
2004	City of London Overall Urban Design Award	-	London Central Library
2005	National Post/Design Exchange Award	Silver	Angus Glen Community Centre
2006	Wood Works Design Award	Lerge institution	Angus Glen Community Centre
2006	Wood Works Design Award	Building the Future	General
2006	Ontario Association of Architects Good Design is Good Business Award	-	Angus Glen Community Centre
2006	Ontario Association of Architects Architectural Excellence Award	Honourable Mention	Chemical Sciences Building, Trent University
2006	ARIDO Public & Institutional Spaces Award	Award of Merit	Whitby Public Library and Civic Square
