= Toronto Police Headquarters =

Coordinates: 43.661348°N 79.385458°W

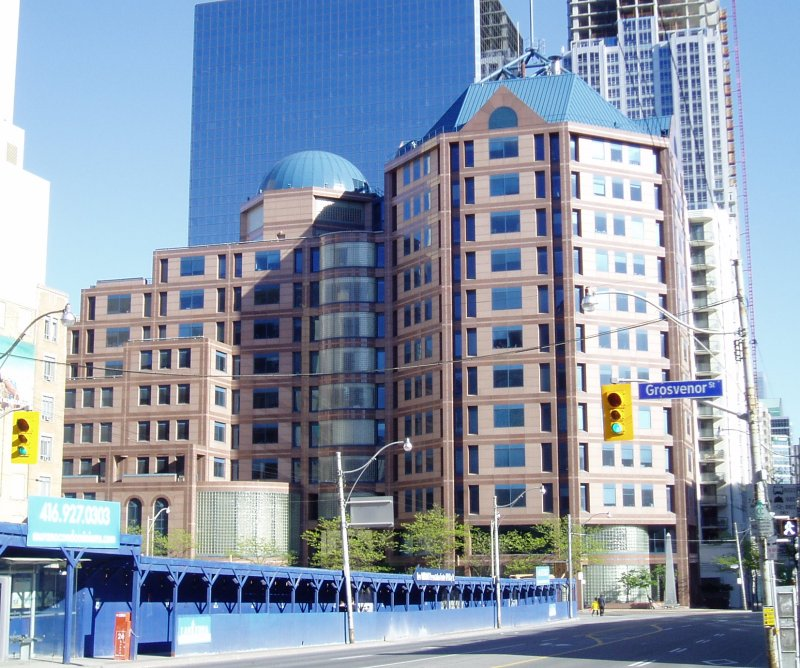
- Toronto Police Headquarters in 2006

General information
- Type: Office complex
- Architectural style: Postmodern
- Location: 40 College Street; Toronto, Ontario; M5G 2J3
- Current tenants: Toronto Police Service
- Construction started: 1985
- Completed: 1988
- Owner: City of Toronto

Height
- Height: 50.0 m (164.0 ft)

Technical details
- Floor count: 12

Design and construction
- Architects: Shore Tilbe Henschel Irwin & Peters and Mathers & Haldenby

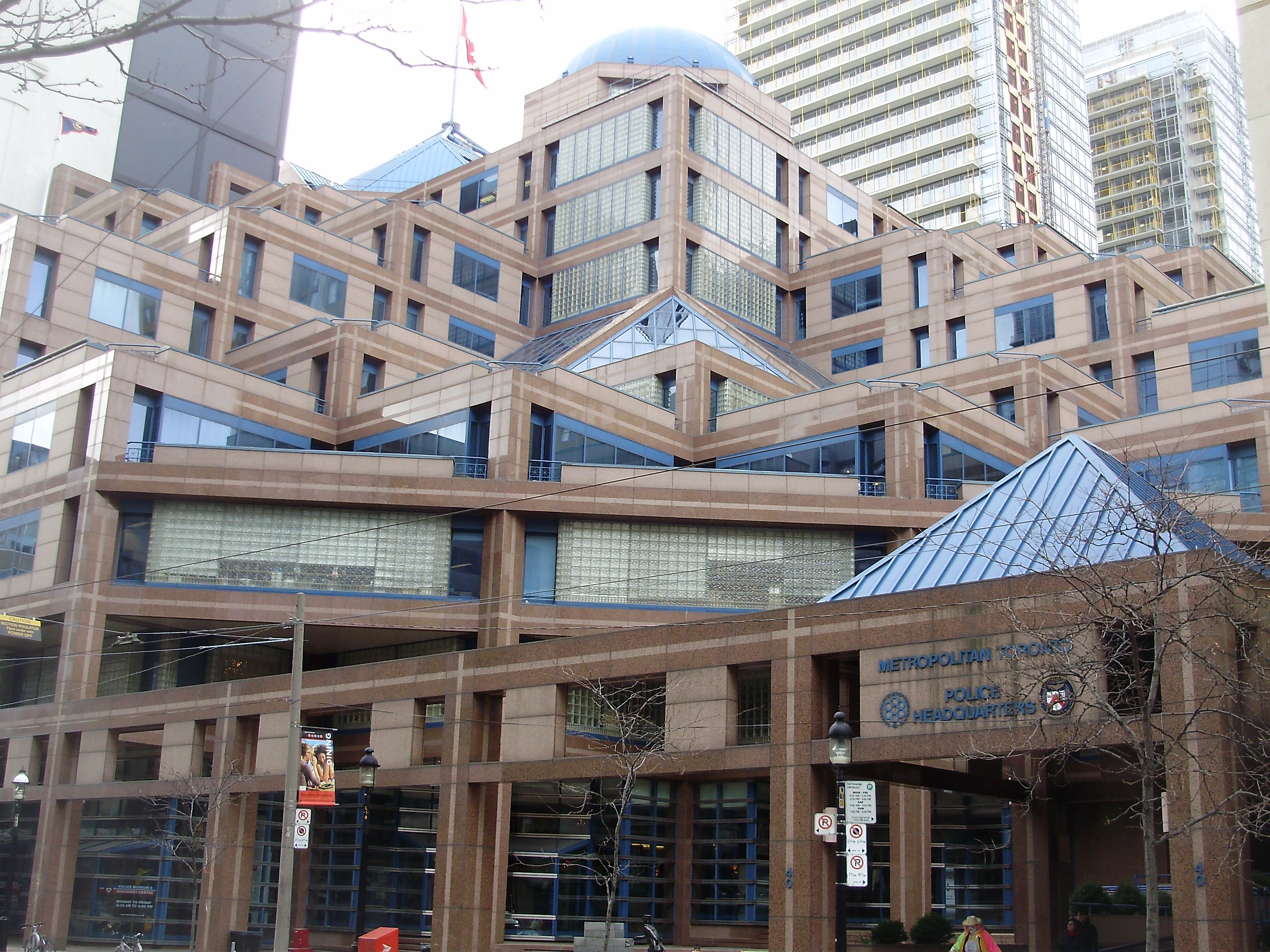
The main entrance on College Street

Toronto Police Headquarters (French: Quartier général de la police de Toronto) is the headquarters of the Toronto Police Service, located at 40 College Street in Toronto, Ontario, Canada. It is the first purpose-built police headquarters in Toronto since the formation of the city's original police force in 1835.

== History ==
The current headquarters is on the former site of the downtown Toronto YMCA building at Bay Street and Grenville Street. The Central YMCA Building was built in 1913 and vacated in 1984 for the new YMCA building on Grosvenor Street.

== Architecture ==
Completed in 1988 by Toronto firms Shore Tilbe Henschel Irwin & Peters and Mathers & Haldenby, the twelve floor, 50m tall (164 ft.) building is an example of Postmodern architecture. It was built to replace the older and smaller office on Jarvis Street.

The building is composed of a series of glass block and pink granite cubes, which step back as they rise along College and Grenville streets. An octagonal twelve-storey tower meets the southeast corner of Bay and Grenville streets. Natural light pours into the central area of the building through a ten-storey high atrium. A domed roof crowns the elevator lobby atop the terraced structure.

Street officer nicknames for the structure can vary, depending on the individual officer's opinion of headquarters as an institution: "the Pink Palace" and "the Pink Whorehouse" are two examples.

A fully stocked bar, the Executive Officers Lounge has been located on the 4th floor since 1988. Since 1989, it has been licensed by the Alcohol and Gaming Commission of Ontario. It is operated by the Toronto Police Senior Officers' Association, and access to the bar is limited to senior officers – those ranked inspector or above. In October 2022, the superintendent in charge of the Toronto Police Service's disciplinary tribunal pleaded guilty to driving with a blood alcohol content above the legal limit in January of that year after leaving the lounge. In June 2023, the Toronto Police Service announced that the bar's license would not be renewed and that it would be closed.

== Previous Police Headquarters (1835–1988) ==
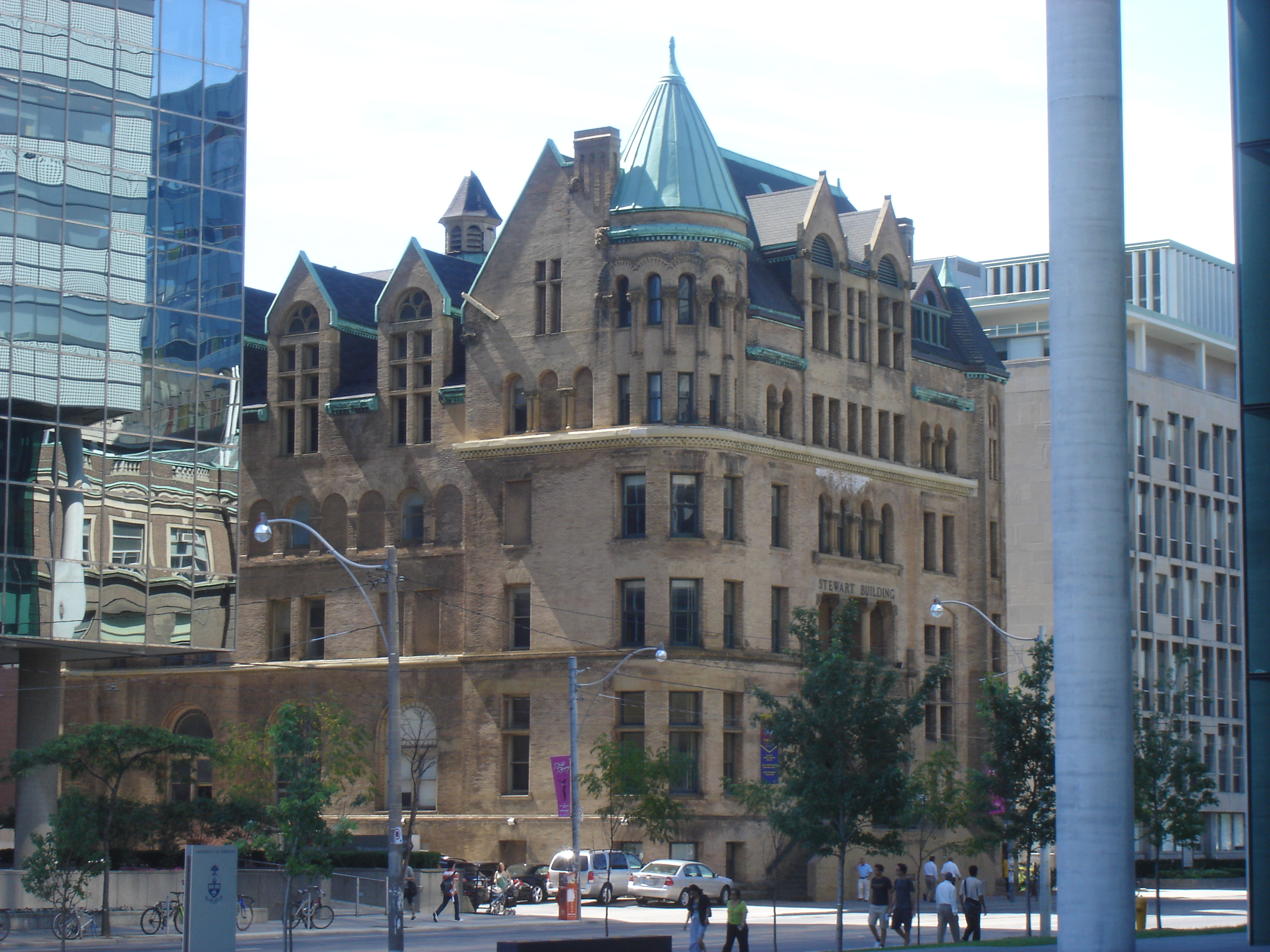
Toronto Police Department Headquarters from 1932 to 1960

- 590 Jarvis Street was a headquarters for the then Metropolitan Toronto Police from 1967 to 1988, then used by the City of Toronto until it was sold and torn down for residential development. The 6-storey building was built originally for the Foresters, until the group moved to Don Mills.
- Old Imperial Oil Building (92 King Street East at Church Street) became Police Headquarters in 1960 after Imperial Oil moved to the Imperial Oil Building in 1957. Police remained here until 1967.
- 149 College Street was headquarters for the then Toronto Police Department from 1932 (Metro Toronto Police from 1957) to 1960.

Toronto Police Department headquarters from 1835 to 1932:

- Old City Hall (Toronto) 1902-1932 - force was located in offices within City Hall building
- 8 Court Street 1876-1902 - co-shared as police station; demolished and now site of Court House Park since 1997
- St. Lawrence Market 1835-1876 - Constables based out of South Market building c. 1850 with earlier buildings torn down or burned down
