= Intact Centre =

Office building in Toronto, Ontario, Canada

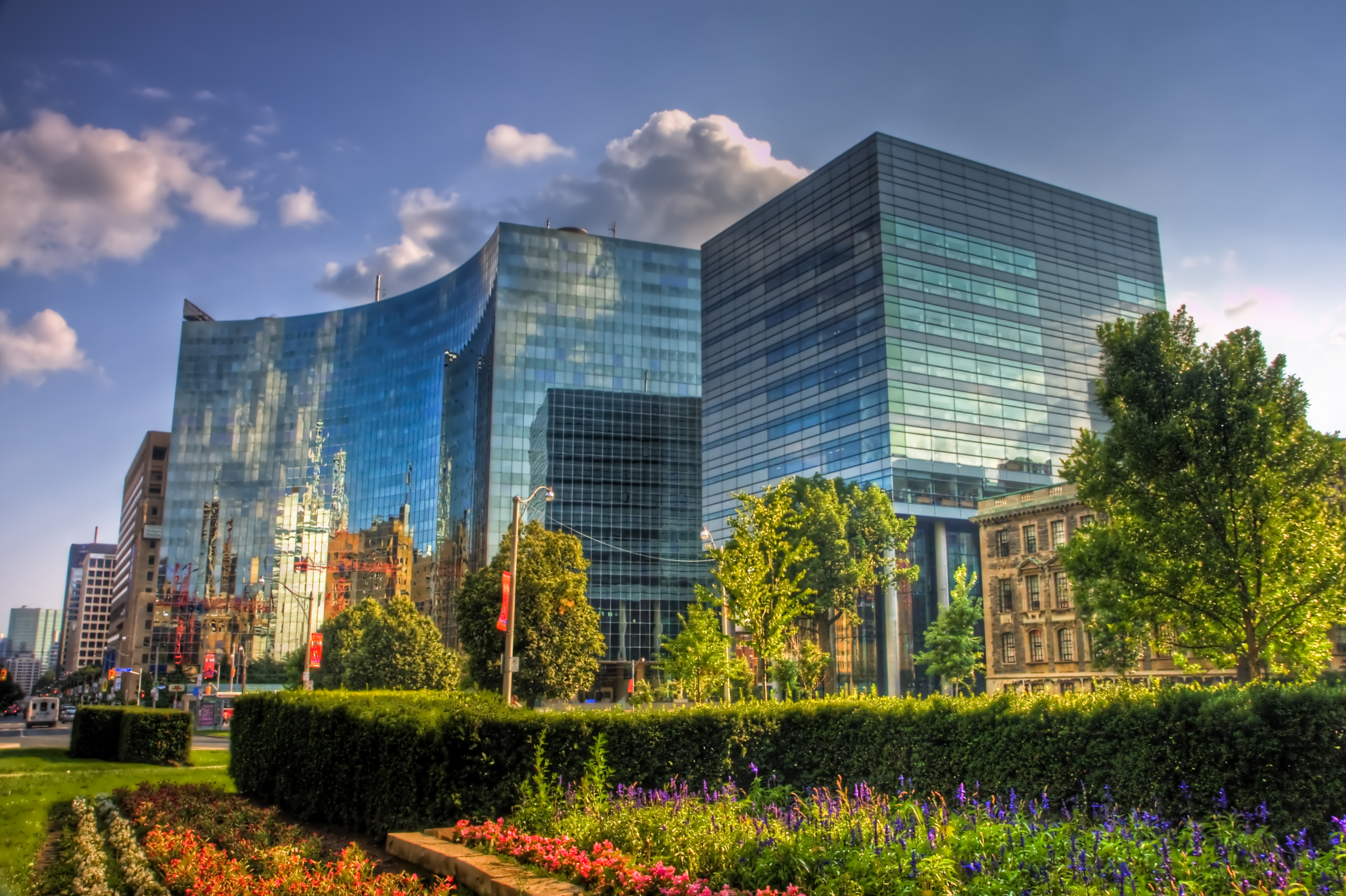
- Intact Centre with the Leslie L. Dan Pharmacy Building to the right
- Interactive map of the Intact Centre area
- Former names: Hydro Place, Ontario Hydro Building, Ontario Power Building

General information
- Type: Office building
- Architectural style: International
- Location: 700 University Avenue, Toronto, Ontario, Canada
- Coordinates: 43.658876°N 79.391273°W
- Completed: 1976
- Opened: 1976
- Owner: KingSett Capital Inc.

Technical details
- Floor count: 20
- Floor area: 113,898 m^{2} (1,225,990 sq ft)
- Lifts/elevators: 17

Design and construction
- Architects: Kenneth Raymond Cooper, Kenneth H. Candy
- Architecture firm: Gordon S. Adamson and Associates
- Awards: BOMA Canada 2020 TOBY
- Designations: LEED Gold, Fitwel 1 Star, BOMA BEST Gold, WiredScore Platinum, WELL, Rick Hansen Foundation Accessibility

Other information
- Public transit: Queen's Park

The Intact Centre is an office building located in Toronto, Ontario, Canada that serves as the head offices of Ontario Power Generation (OPG) and Intact Financial. The University of Toronto's Department of Statistical Science and Department of Sociology are also located inside. It was originally built in 1975 for Ontario Hydro (of which OPG is a successor company) and has been previously known as Hydro Place, Ontario Hydro Building and Ontario Power Building. The building was designed by Kenneth R. Cooper, Adamson Associates served as the architect of record. The building is owned by Triovest.

In 2015 the Minister of Energy directed OPG to sell 700 University Avenue and the parking garage at 40 Murray Street. The sale took place in January 2017. Proceeds were deposited in Ontario's Trillium Trust, which funds various infrastructure projects in Ontario.

== See also ==
- Ontario Power Generation
- Intact Financial
- University of Toronto
