= Economy of Toronto =

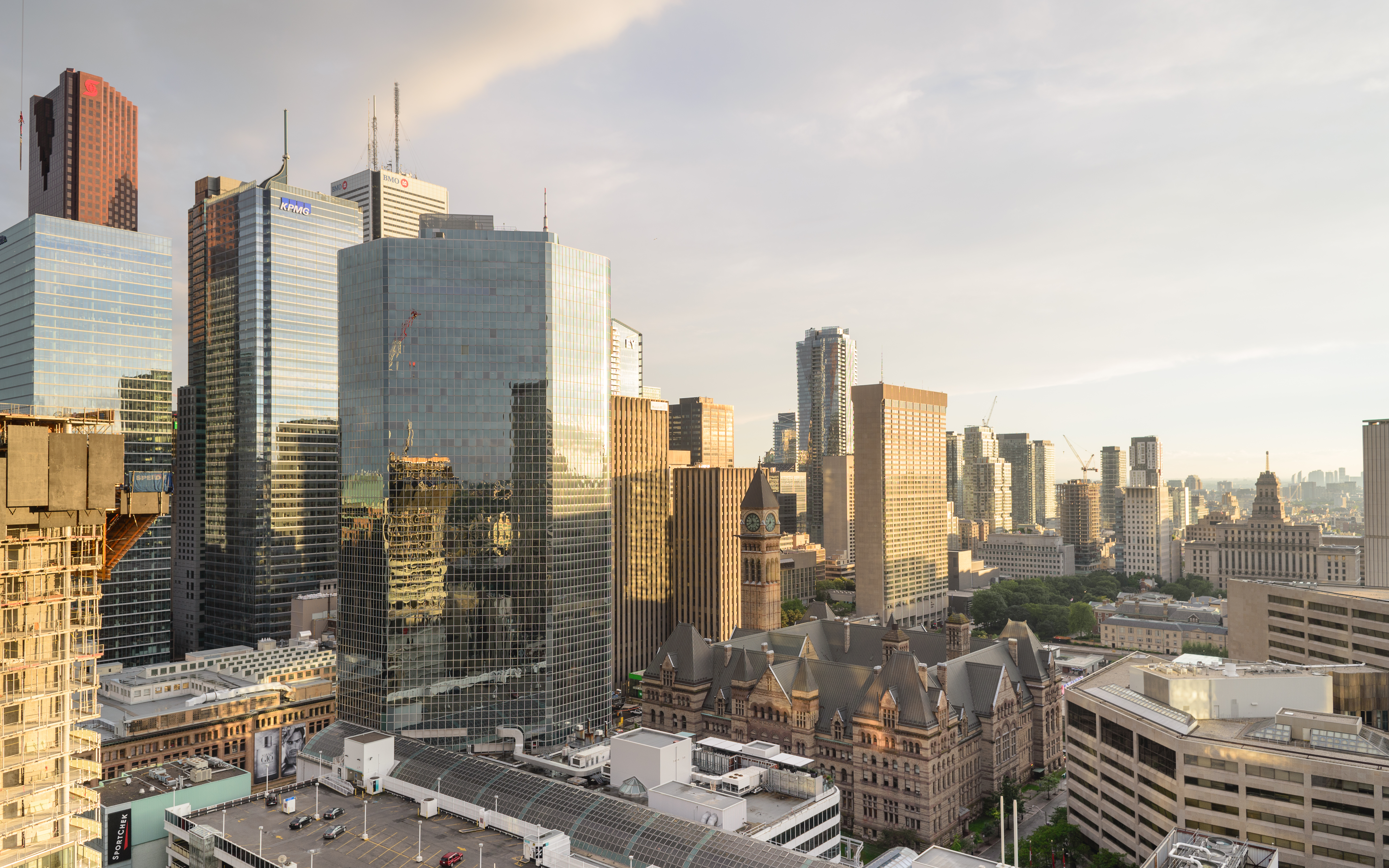
Toronto's Financial District from the northeast at the Pantages Tower. The district is the city's central business district.

The economy of Toronto is the largest contributor to the Canadian economy, at 20% of the national GDP, and an important economic hub in the world economy. Toronto is a commercial, distribution, financial and industrial centre. It is Canada's banking and stock exchange centre and is the country's primary wholesale and distribution point. Ontario's wealth of raw materials and hydroelectric power have made Toronto a primary centre of industry. The metropolitan area of Greater Toronto produces more than half of Canada's manufactured goods. The economy of Toronto has had a GDP growth rate of 2.4 percent annually since 2009, outpacing the national average. Toronto's population was 3.025 million people as of 2022, while the population of the Toronto census metropolitan area was 6.47 million during the same year.

== History ==
Toronto is located on a crossroads dating back to aboriginal times with excellent harbours with many rivers. The economy grew based on the settlement of Ontario. During the late 19th century, Toronto became the centre of railways and the supplier of goods to Ontario. Its status as a political centre gave it some stability during periods of economic uncertainty. Toronto saw a large boom after World War II when immigrants, especially from war-decimated Europe, chose the area to settle. Manufacturing, notably automotive manufacturing, grew to supply the population growth.

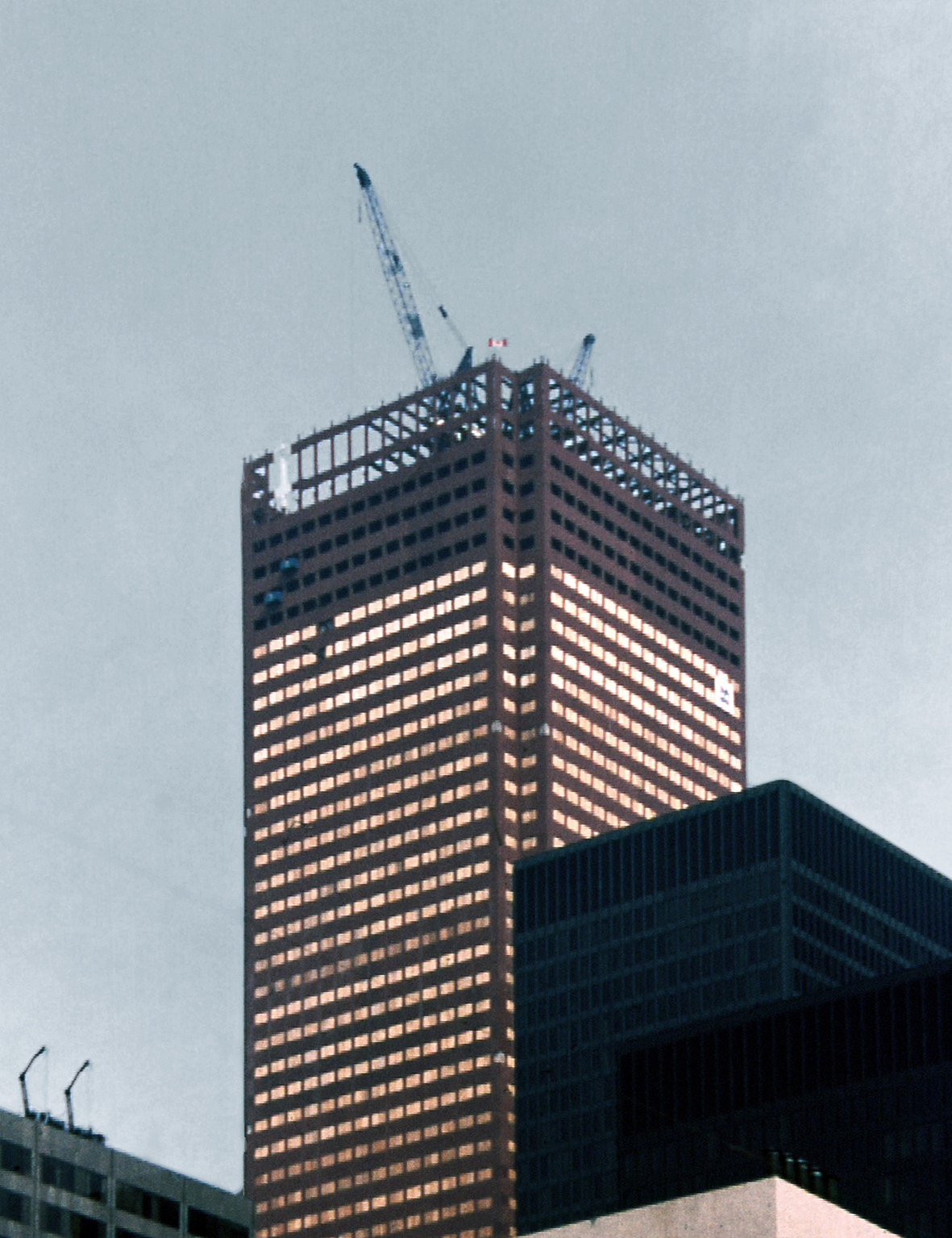
Construction of First Canadian Place, the operational headquarters of the Bank of Montreal, in 1975. The 1970s saw several Canadian financial institutions move to Toronto.

Toronto grew at a faster rate than the other great centre of Canada at the time, Montreal, and surpassed it in the 1970s. Shipping by water was instrumental in Toronto's early growth, but this has diminished to the point where the harbour is lightly used by industry. The area around Pearson Airport, the country's busiest airport, has become one of the largest industrial areas.

Further growth in the Toronto area is often attributed to the rise of Quebec separatism, though the extent of its influence is still contested by some, who argue that its effect was exaggerated by the English media. During the 1970s, the Quebec Liberal Party and the Parti Québécois enacted a series of French-language laws, which were perceived as unfavourable towards English-language businesses (especially multinational corporations, whose markets extended far beyond Quebec's borders) and English-speaking Montrealers. Some of the former (including the Bank of Montreal) and a number of the latter subsequently relocated to Toronto, where French proficiency is not a necessity for business or employment.

Much of Toronto's manufacturing sector has moved to outlying suburbs in the Greater Toronto Area, seeking lower land costs and land for expansion. This is not a new trend; it has been present for over 100 years. Early suburbs, such as West Toronto, developed for industry and were later engulfed by the expansion of the City of Toronto. West Toronto once had a large stockyard, which has moved well north of the city. Much of the older industrial land has been converted into new residential neighbourhoods, supporting loft and condominium development and the industrial concerns have moved further away. The sector remains a large employer, employing 25,000 directly.

Toronto itself has diversified into service-based industries. It is the centre of the Anglophone media industry in Canada, the advertising industry, the entertainment industry, the fashion industry, the communication and technology industry, the pharmaceutical industry, the retail industry and the centre of the financial industry in Canada. The area is a large site of computer software development. Toronto has also become the site of many headquarters of companies, which have their primary activities elsewhere, such as mining and real estate, which need to stay close to the centre of finance. As Toronto developed, it has also developed its tourism industry, developing attractions such as the Toronto Eaton Centre, Rogers Centre, Scotiabank Arena, Roy Thomson Hall, Art Gallery of Ontario, Royal Ontario Museum, Ripley's Aquarium and most notably the CN Tower, though it is also a communications tower.

== Key industries ==
=== Finance ===
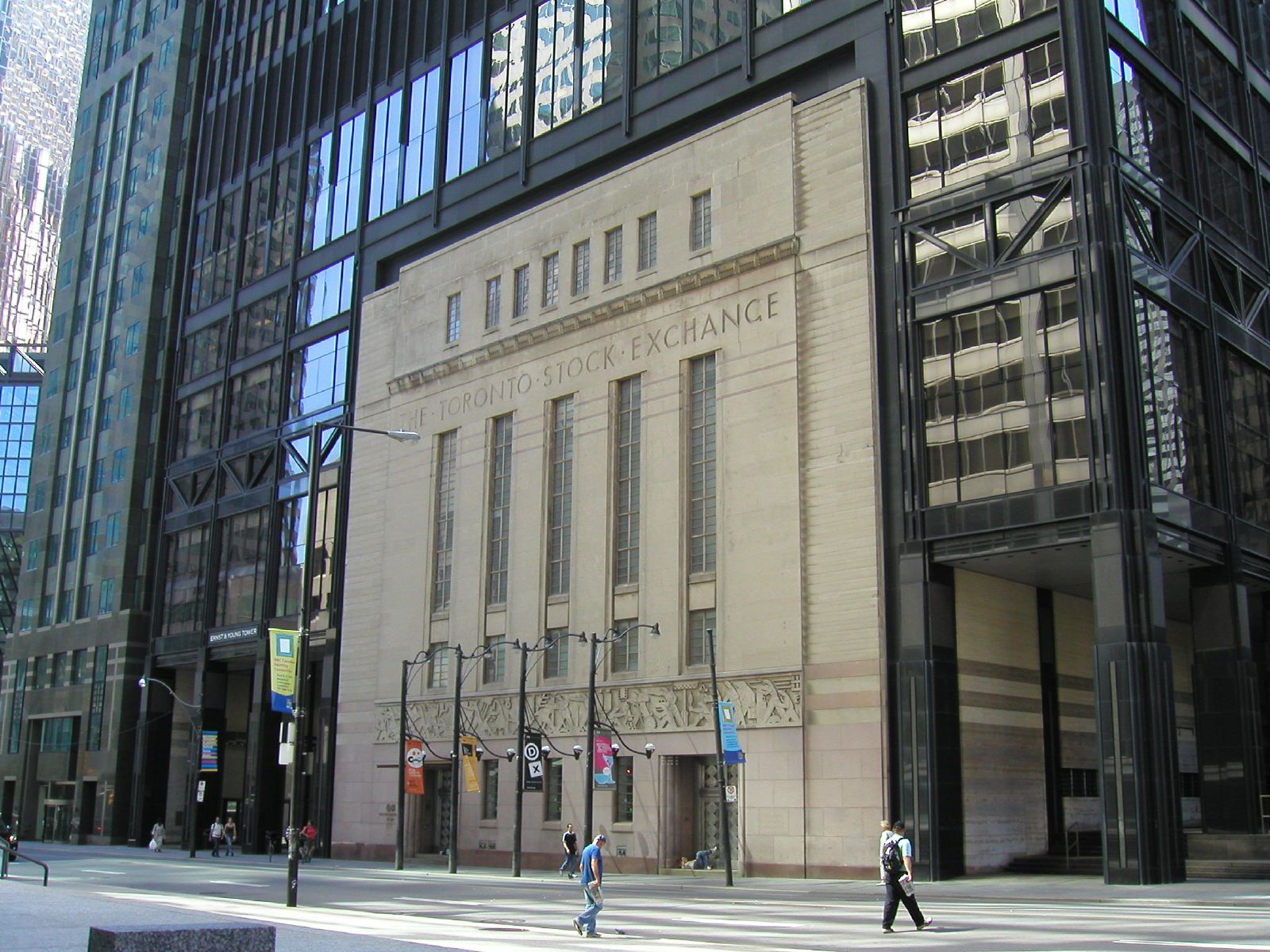
The Art Deco façade of the former Toronto Stock Exchange building. The Toronto Stock Exchange is the largest in Canada.

As the country’s commercial and financial hub and one of the largest financial centres in the world as per the British Global Financial Centres Index, Toronto hosts the Toronto Stock Exchange (TSX), the third largest stock exchange in the Americas by market capitalization and ninth in the world as of January 31, 2015. In the 2020 Global Financial Centres Index, Toronto was ranked as having the 31st most competitive financial center in the world (third in Canada after Vancouver and Montreal). The financial service sector, including banks and insurance companies, account for about 20% of Toronto's economy. Toronto was the first North American exchange to employ decimal pricing, and one of the first in the world to use a fully computerized system. The world's first exchange-traded fund (ETF) was listed in the exchange in 1990. The TSX is the world's largest exchange for the mining, oil and gas industry, the leader in clean-tech listings, and is second in North America in the number of technology companies listed. Toronto is the fastest growing financial center in North America and the second largest in North America, after New York City and Chicago, with approximately 205,000 staff in the Canada's biggest banks and brokerages. In 2008, Forbes Magazine named Toronto the 10th most economically powerful city in the world, ahead of Madrid, Philadelphia and Mexico City.

The Financial District in Toronto centers on Bay Street, the equivalent to Wall Street in New York. The city hosts the headquarters of all five of Canada's largest banks, Royal Bank of Canada, Toronto-Dominion Bank, Scotiabank, Bank of Montreal and Canadian Imperial Bank of Commerce, and was ranked as the safest banking system in the world between 2007 and 2014 the World Economic Forum. Toronto's economy has seen a steady boom in growth thanks to a large number of corporations relocating their Canadian headquarters into the city, and Canada's growing cultural significance.

The city's budget for the fiscal year 2019 was $11.559 billion and is funded primarily by property taxes (the net budget) totalling $4.398 billion.

=== Media and entertainment ===
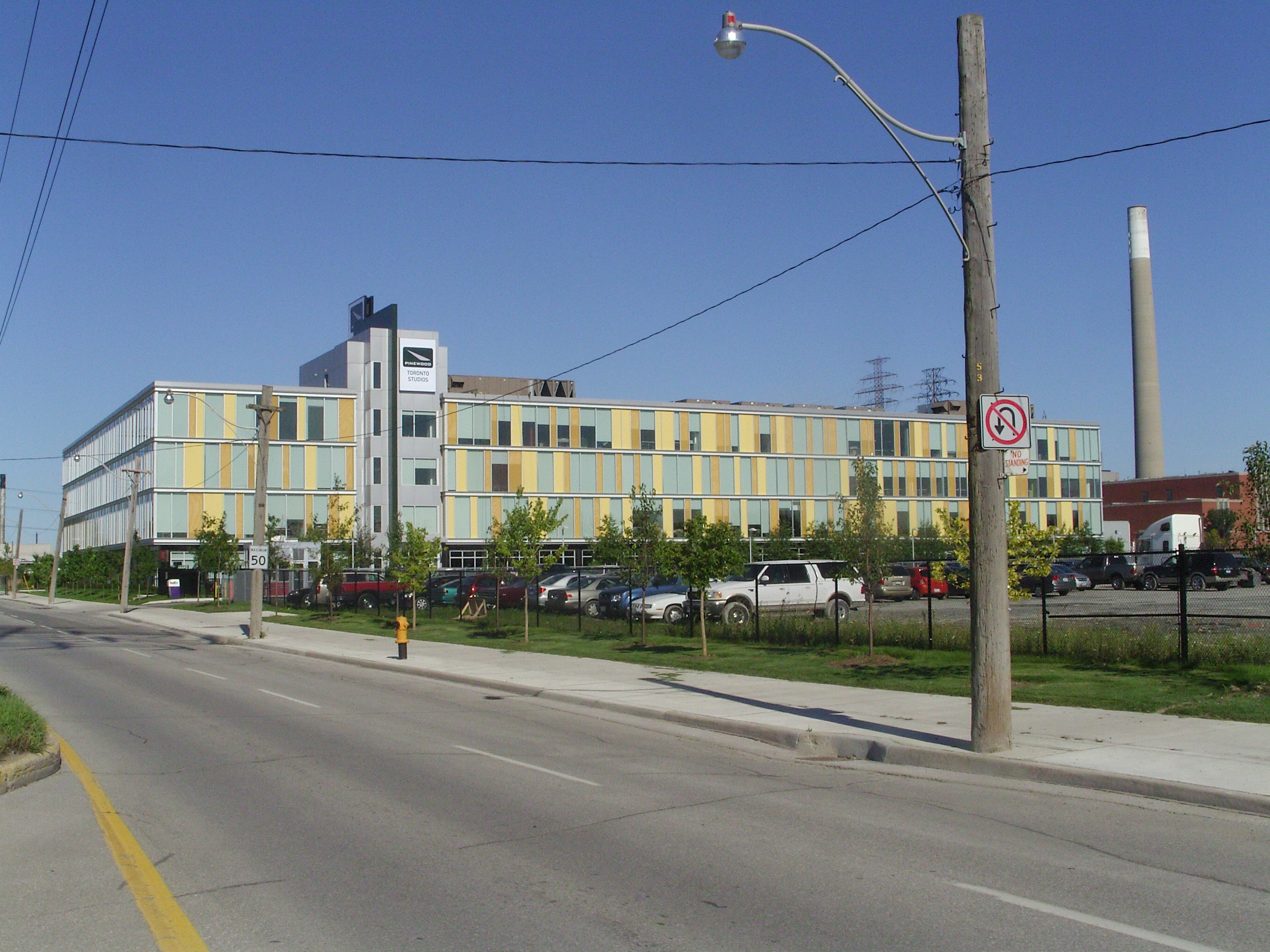
Pinewood Toronto Studios is Canada's largest film and television production complex.

Toronto is one of the centres of Canada's film and television industry, due in part to the lower cost of production in Canada. The city's streets and landmarks are seen in a variety of films, mimicking the scenes of American cities such as Chicago and New York. The city provides a diversity of settings and neighbourhoods to shoot films, with production facilitated by Toronto's Film and Television Office.

Toronto is home to major film studios such as Pinewood Toronto Studios, Cinespace Film Studios and Revival 629. While the surrounding region has seen the arrival of new production spaces such as CBS Stages Canada and Markham Movieland.

A major new film studio, Filmport, started construction in 2006, with the first phase opening in March 2008 and the second phase in 2010, and features the largest sound stage in North America, at 4,000 square metres (43,000 ft^{2}). The city also hosts the annual Toronto International Film Festival (TIFF), one of the largest in North America, as well as Hot Docs Canadian International Documentary Festival, the largest such festival in the continent.

Toronto's film industry has extended beyond the Toronto CMA into adjoining cities such as Hamilton and Oshawa.

As well as numerous film production spaces, Toronto is also home to the headquarters of many media and entertainment corporations, including Bell Media, Rogers Communications, Corus Entertainment and Canadian Broadcast Corporation.

=== Technology ===
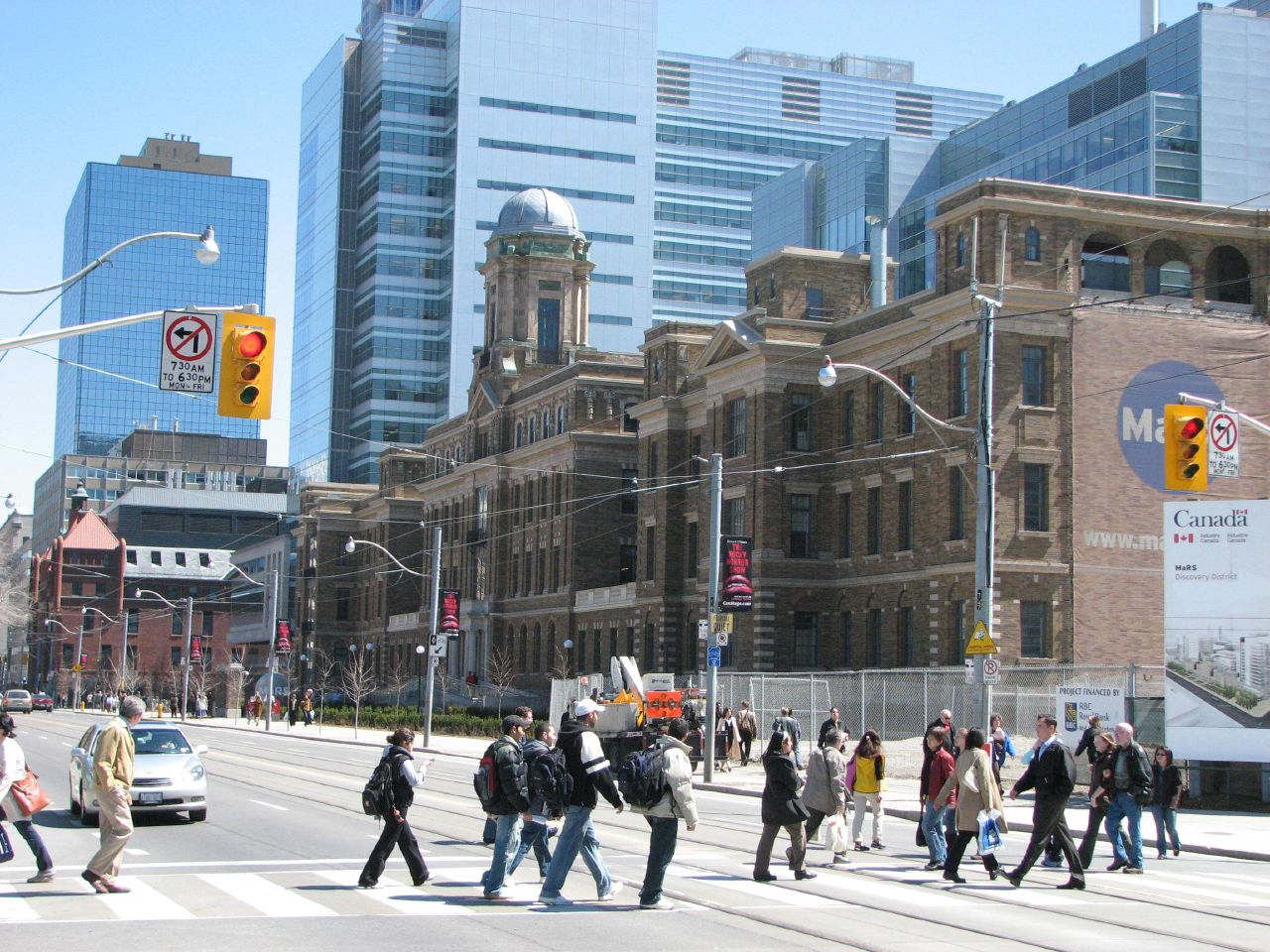
The MaRS building in Toronto's Discovery District. Most of Toronto's biotech industry is located there.

Toronto is a large hub of the Canadian and global technology industry, generating $52 billion in revenues annually. In 2017, Toronto tech firms offered almost 30,000 jobs which is higher than the combination of San Francisco Bay area, Seattle and Washington, D.C. The area bound between the Greater Toronto Area, the Kitchener-Waterloo region and the City of Hamilton was termed a "digital corridor" by the Branham Group, a region highly concentrated with technology companies and jobs similar to Silicon Valley in California. It is the third largest center for information and communications technology in North America, coming in behind New York City and Silicon Valley, with over 168,000 people and 15,000 companies working in the Toronto technology sector alone. Toronto is also home to a large startup ecosystem. In 2013, the city was ranked as the 8th best startup scene in the world and 3rd when it came to performance and support.

Between 2022 and 2025, Toronto added more tech jobs than any other North American market. It was ranked third in the tech sector behind only Seattle and San Francisco.

The region has also emerged as the Canada's largest biotechnology cluster, with over 50% of the country's life sciences companies based in the area. Toronto's biotech industry is centered around the Discovery District, a 2.5 km^{2} area of the downtown core hosting a number of large hospitals, leading research institutions, and the MaRS buildings.

=== Tourism ===
Toronto is home to a sprawling and diverse commercial infrastructure. The Toronto Eaton Centre is the primary tourist attraction in Toronto, with over 47 million visitors per year. Other commercial areas that receives many tourists include the PATH network, which is the world's largest underground shopping complex and the eclectic Kensington and St. Lawrence Market. The Mink Mile and Yorkville neighbourhood is one of the most elegant shopping and dining districts in Toronto.

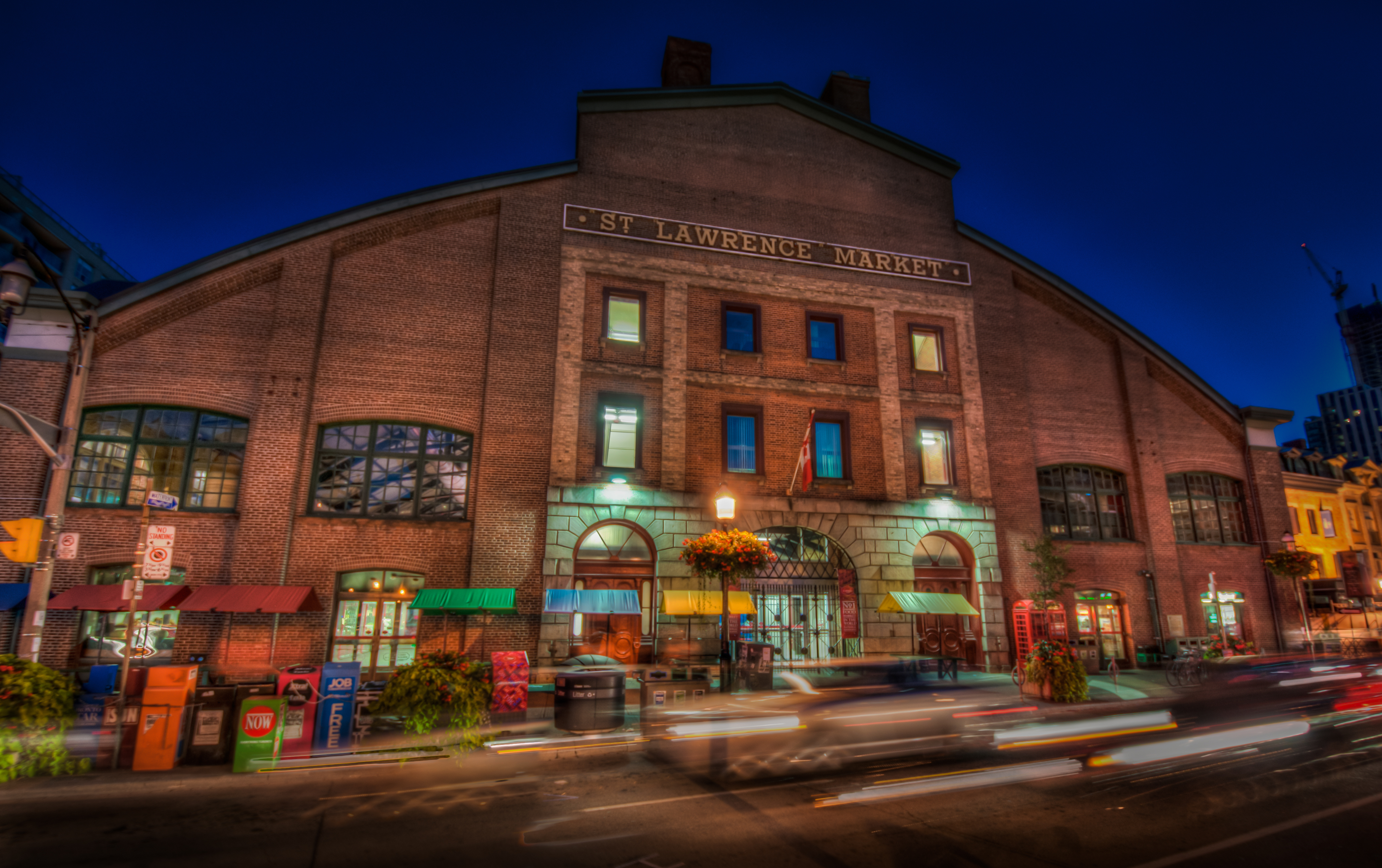
St. Lawrence Market is a major public market and tourist destination in the city.

The fashion district is located near King and Spadina, close to the old Chinatown to the north and entertainment district to the east. Sunday shopping in Toronto first got its start in the fashion district in the 1980s.

St. Lawrence Market is a large, historic vendors market with an open air section in summer selling fresh locally grown produce. Kensington Market also has an outdoor vendor section located close to Chinatown.

The city itself has many large and unique malls and shopping centers, such as CF Sherway Gardens and Fairview Mall. Shopping in Toronto has become a large draw for tourists, with, for example, the Eaton Center being designated as a tourist attraction in the 1980s. Toronto and its immediate area also boasts many large ethnic shopping malls, the largest of which is Pacific Mall in Markham, catering to the area's large Chinese population.

The Toronto Islands are a major tourist draw, attracting people for the beauty of the scenery, the ban of private motor vehicles on the islands outside of the airport, and proximity to downtown Toronto. As well, the CN Tower, Casa Loma, Toronto's theater and musicals as well as Sankofa Square (the former Yonge-Dundas Square), Ripley's Aquarium of Canada are magnets for tourists.

Toronto is considered one of the world's most multicultural cities due to its wide variety foreign-born transplants and ethnic enclaves which include Little Italy, Chinatown, Koreatown, and Greektown.

Toronto is home to a number of major league sports and is home to professional sports teams including the Toronto Argonauts, Toronto Blue Jays, Toronto FC, Toronto Maple Leafs, Toronto Raptors, and the Toronto Wolfpack. Major sporting events that take place in Toronto annually include the Canadian Open for tennis, (Note: The events of the Canadian Open for tennis alternate between the cities of Montreal and Toronto. In even-numbered years the men's tournament is held in Toronto, while the women's tournament is held in Montreal, and vice versa in odd-numbered years) Honda Indy Toronto, and the Toronto Waterfront Marathon. The Canadian Open for golf has also been held in Toronto on 20 occasions, the last in 2010 at the St. George's Golf and Country Club. Although five golf courses in Toronto have hosted the Canadian Open in the past, St. George's Golf and Country Club is the only golf course in Toronto that remains in the Canadian Open's rotation of venues. The city also boasts a number of major sporting facilities such as Scotiabank Arena, Rogers Centre and BMO Field.

=== Real Estate & Construction ===
Home to a variety of large commercial and residential real estate developers as well as construction, engineering and architectural firms, real estate and construction is a major component of Toronto's economy. In 2016 real estate and construction directly accounted for 18% of Toronto's economy.

Major commercial property developers and managers in Toronto include Brookfield Properties, Oxford Properties and Cadillac Fairview. Toronto also has a well-established condominium construction industry and is a major North American centre for multi-unit residential construction.

== Corporate headquarters based in Toronto ==
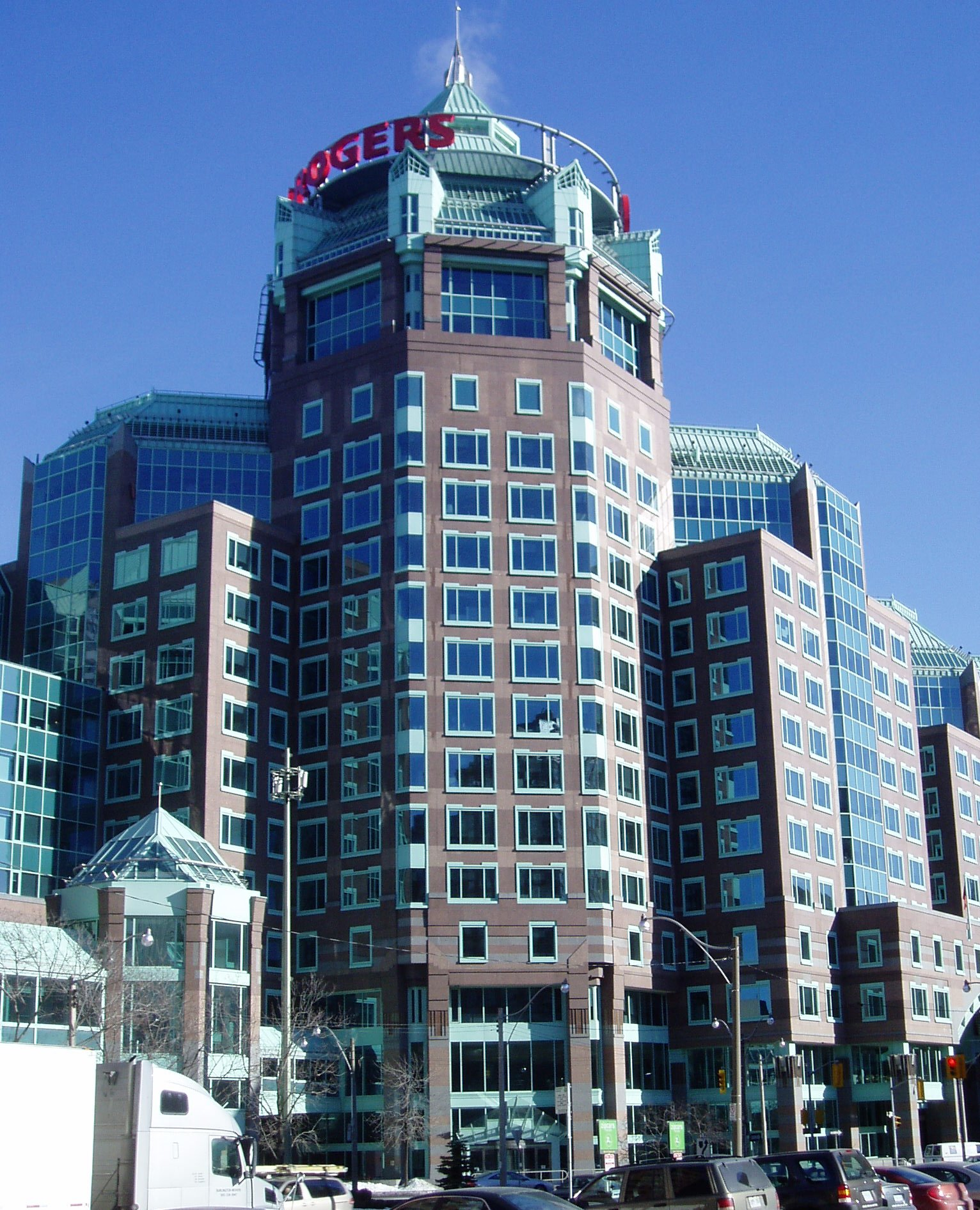
The Rogers Building is Rogers Communications head office building in Toronto.

Half of the largest companies in Canada are headquartered in the Greater Toronto Area as of 2013. A number of major corporations are based in the city, including Manulife Financial, TD Canada Trust, Canadian Imperial Bank of Commerce, Royal Bank of Canada, Scotiabank, Bank of Montreal, Celestica, Four Seasons Hotels and Resorts, Rogers Communications, and many others. Many other companies are also based in the Greater Toronto Area outside of the city limits, such as IBM Canada, General Motors, Magna International and Walmart Canada.

Several companies with their Canadian headquarters located in Toronto include:

- Apple Canada (communications & media)
- Ubisoft Toronto (video games & technology)
- ASUS (electronics)
- BMG Music Canada (media)
- Coca-Cola Company (non-alcoholic beverages)
- Citibank Canada (financial service)
- Google Canada (communications and media)
- Intel (electronics)
- McDonald's Canada (fast food restaurants)
- Marriott International (hotelier)
- Microsoft Canada (communication & media)
- Nordstrom (retail)
- SAP SE Canada (communication and media)
- Sirius Canada (satellite radio)
- Toyota Motor Manufacturing Canada (automaker)
- XM Radio Canada (satellite radio)

Several companies with their global headquarters located in Toronto include:

- Brookfield Asset Management (property management)
- Celestica (communication & media)
- Cinespace Film Studios (entertainment)
- Cookie Jar Group (entertainment)
- Entertainment One (communication & media)
- Fairmont Hotels and Resorts (hotelier)
- Four Seasons Hotels and Resorts (hotelier)
- George Weston Limited (food production)
- Hudson's Bay Company (retailer)
- McClelland & Stewart (media-publisher)
- Manulife Financial (insurance and financial services)
- Nortel (communication & media)
- Nelvana (entertainment)
- Oxford Properties (property management)
- Porter Airlines (airline)
- Rogers Communications (communications & media)
- Onex Corporation (private equity and investment firm)
- Restaurant Brands International (hospitality)
- Sunwing Airlines (airline)
- Thomson Reuters (media)

== See also ==
- Economy of Ontario
- Greater Toronto Area
- Golden Horseshoe
- Great Lakes Megalopolis
- Toronto Industry Network
