= Intact =

Intact may refer to:

- Intact (group of companies), a Romanian media trust
- Intact (album) and "Intact" (song) by Ned's Atomic Dustbin
- Intacto, a film
- Entire (animal), describing an animal that has not been spayed or neutered
- Genital integrity
- Intact Financial, a Canadian insurance company
