= RSA Insurance Group =

British multinational general insurance company

RSA Insurance Group Limited
- Type: Private
- Industry: Insurance
- Predecessor: Royal Insurance; Sun Alliance
- Founded: 1996; 30 years ago
- Headquarters: London, England
- Key people: Ken Norgrove (CEO, RSA UK & International); Mark Hodges (chairman)
- Revenue: ▼£6,546 million (2020)
- Operating income: ▼£483 million (2020)
- Net income: ▼£364 million (2020)
- Number of employees: 13,500 (2021)
- Parent: Intact Financial Corporation
- Subsidiaries: 123 Money
- Website: www.rsagroup.com

RSA Insurance Group Limited (trading as RSA, formerly RSA Insurance Group plc and Royal and Sun Alliance) is a British multinational general insurance company headquartered in London, England. RSA has major operations in the United Kingdom, Ireland, Scandinavia and Canada. It provides insurance products and services in more than 100 countries through a network of local partners. It has 9 million customers. RSA was formed by the merger of Sun Alliance and Royal Insurance in 1996.

RSA was listed on the London Stock Exchange until it was acquired by Danish insurer Tryg and Canada's Intact Financial Corporation in May 2021. The transaction closed on 1 June 2021.

== History ==
RSA was formed by the merger of Sun Alliance and Royal Insurance in 1996.

^{How RSA was created:}
- RSA Insurance Group (2008)
  - Royal & Sun Alliance Insurance Group plc (1996)
    - Sun Alliance & London (1965) (Note: acquired Phoenix Assurance in 1984)
      - Sun Alliance Insurance Limited (1959)
        - The Sun Fire Office (1710)
        - The Alliance Assurance Company (1824) (Note: founded by Nathan Mayer Rothschild and Moses Montefiore)
      - London Assurance Corporation (1720)
    - Royal Insurance (1845) (Note: acquired Liverpool & London and Globe Insurance Company in 1919)

On 4 February 2014, it was announced that Stephen Hester, former CEO of RBS Group, would become CEO of RSA with immediate effect.

In 2014/15, Hester led a major restructuring of RSA to bolster its finances. Many non-core overseas operations were sold, disposals almost halving the size of the group, with the aim of aligning its strategic focus with its core markets.

In September 2015, RSA divested all its Latin American insurance operations to the Colombian insurance company Grupo Sura for £403 million.

In November 2020, the company received a £7.2 billion offer from Danish insurer Tryg and Canada's Intact Financial Corporation. This deal was considered one of the biggest takeover bids in Europe in 2020. The transaction closed on 1 June 2021. Under the deal, Intact acquired the main international RSA entity as well as its businesses in Canada and the UK, while Tryg took control of RSA's units in Sweden and Norway. Intact and Tryg initially took joint control of RSA's Danish subsidiary Codan Denmark, but shortly thereafter announced plans to sell it to Alm. Brand, which was completed on 2 May 2022.

On 23 July 2021, it was announced that the Motability scheme would be leaving the company and migrating to Direct Line Group with them taking over from 1 September 2023.

On 4 April 2022, Tryg and Intact Financial announced the sale of 50% of its stake holding in its Middle East subsidiary RSA Middle East to National Life & General. This was then followed up with the remaining 50% being sold and becoming a subsidiary of National Life & General on 15 July 2022.

On 28 March 2023, Intact Financial announced that RSA would leave the UK personal lines motor market. Their More Than customers were introduced to Swinton Insurance, a brand of Atlanta Insurance Intermediaries and part of Ardonagh retail.

On 7 September 2023, it was announced that RSA had agreed a deal to acquire NIG and Farmweb in £520 million deal from Direct Line Group.

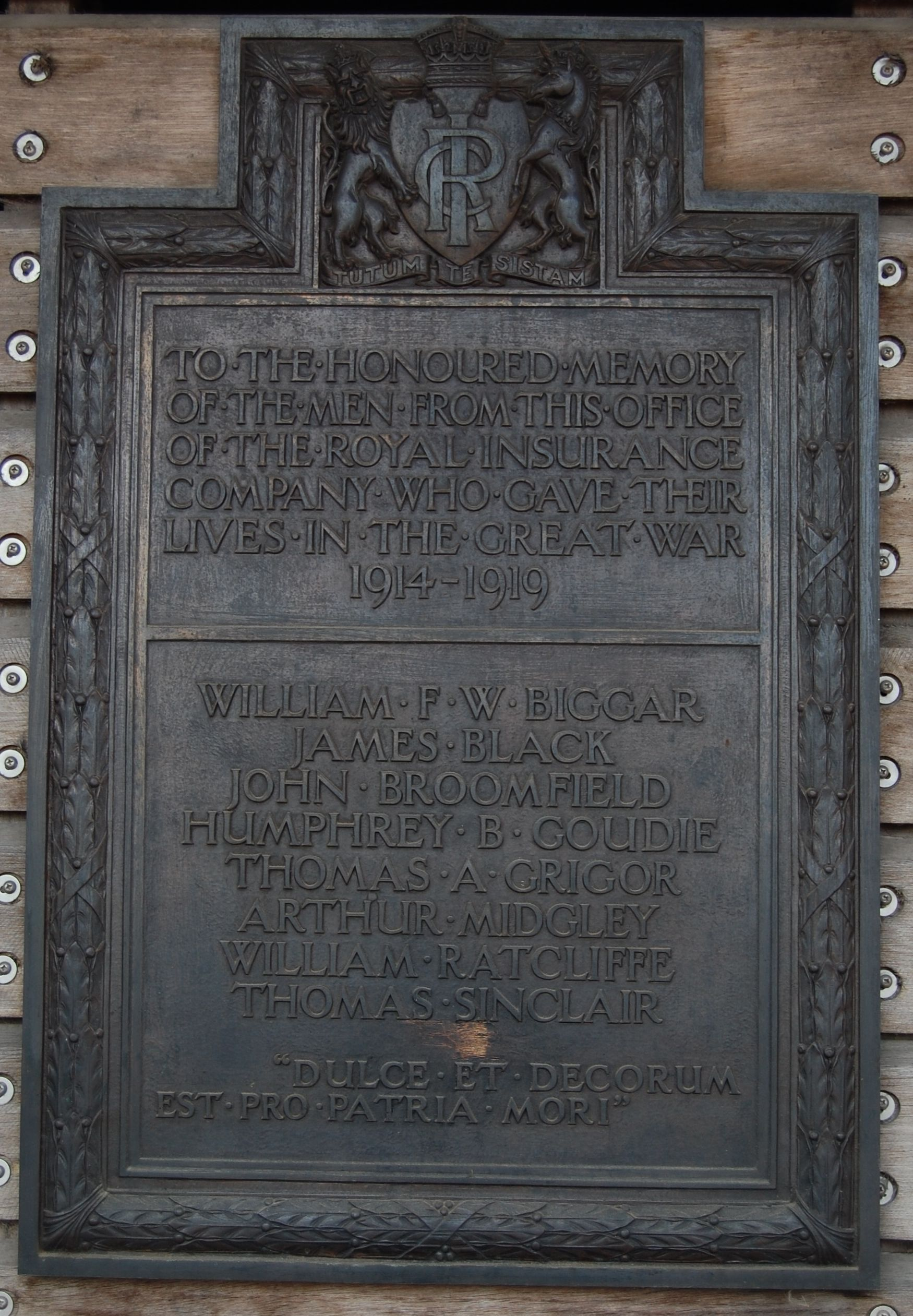
Royal Insurance war memorial, now relocated to the National Memorial Arboretum.

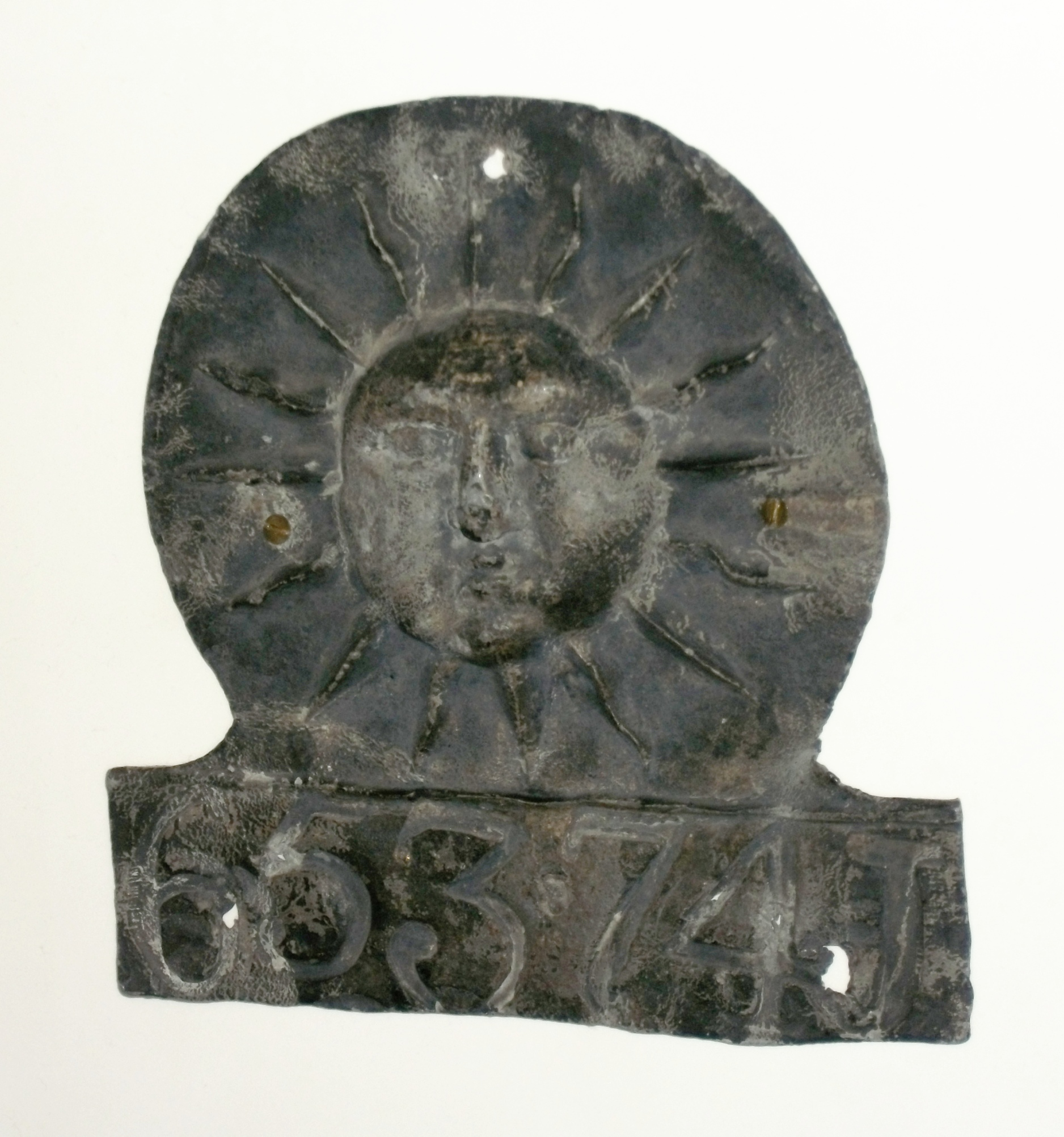
Sun fire insurance plaque on display at Bedford Museum.

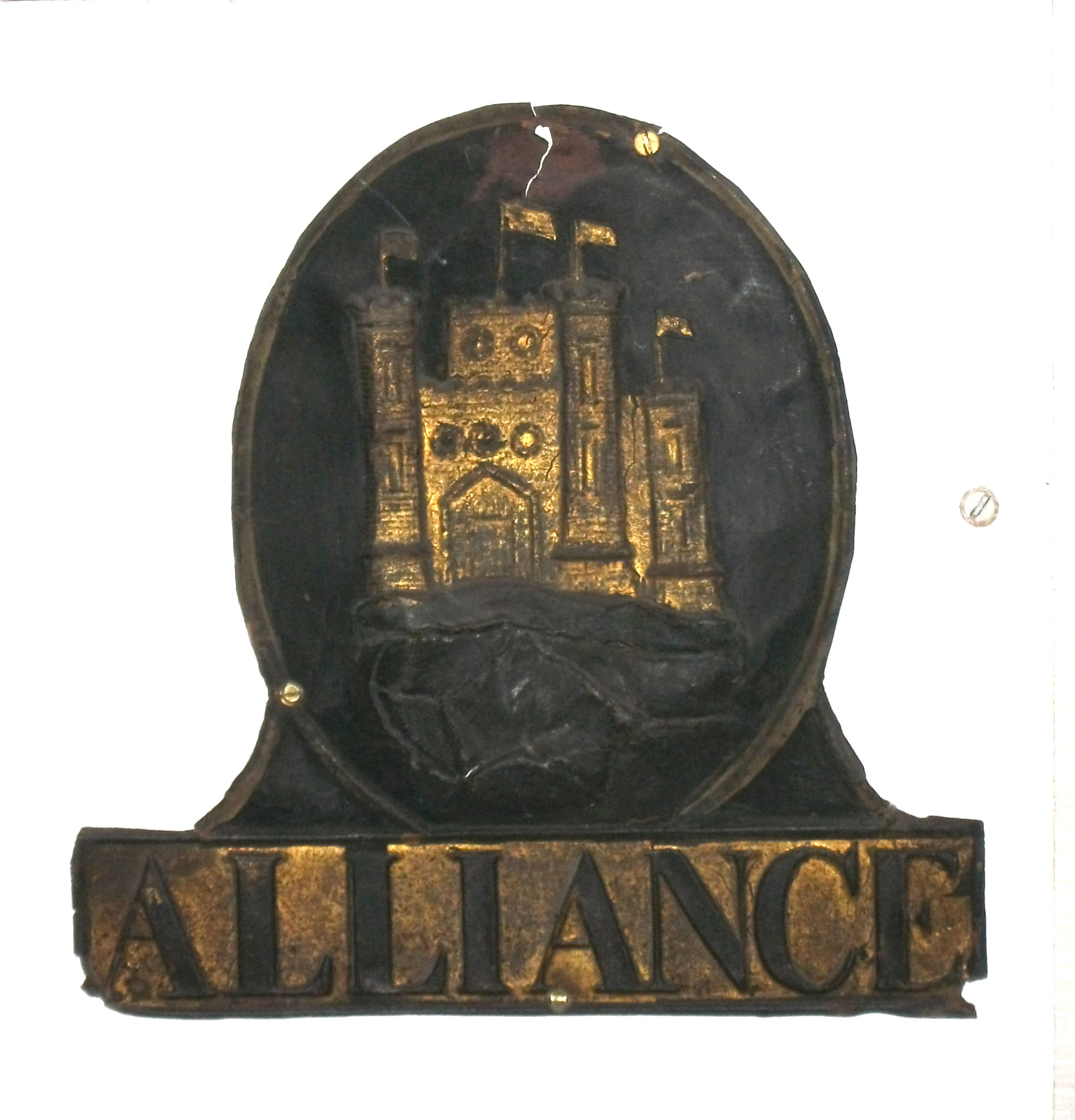
Alliance fire insurance plaque in Bedford Museum.

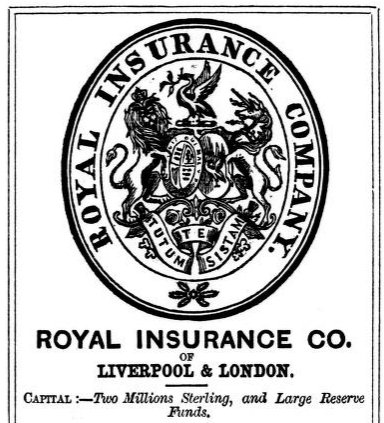
Royal Insurance logo used in Canada, 1857.

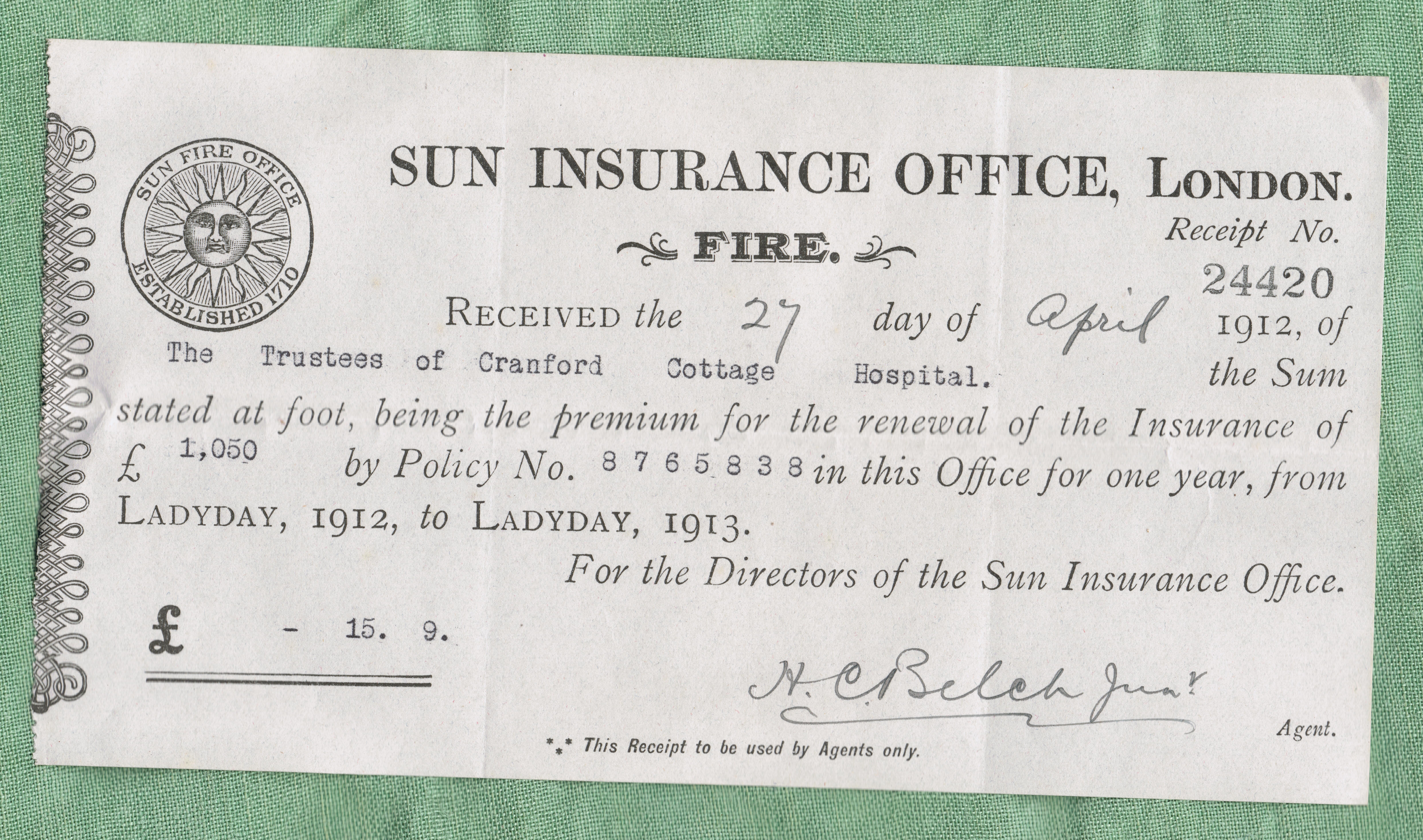
Receipt for a Middlesex cottage hospital, 1912.

Royal and Sun Alliance trademark, 1996-2008

RSA logo, 2008–present.

== Operations ==
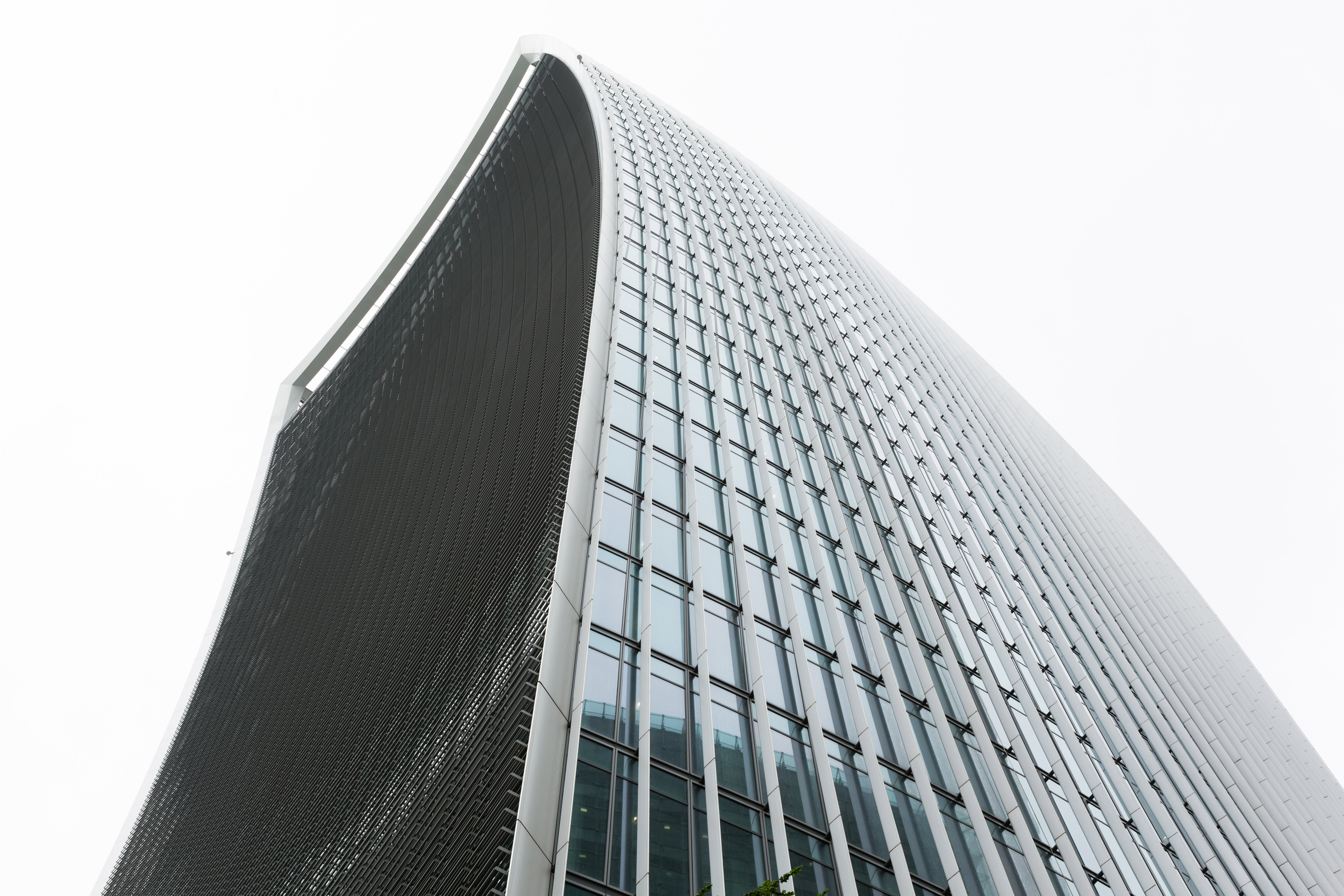
RSA's London offices at 20 Fenchurch Street

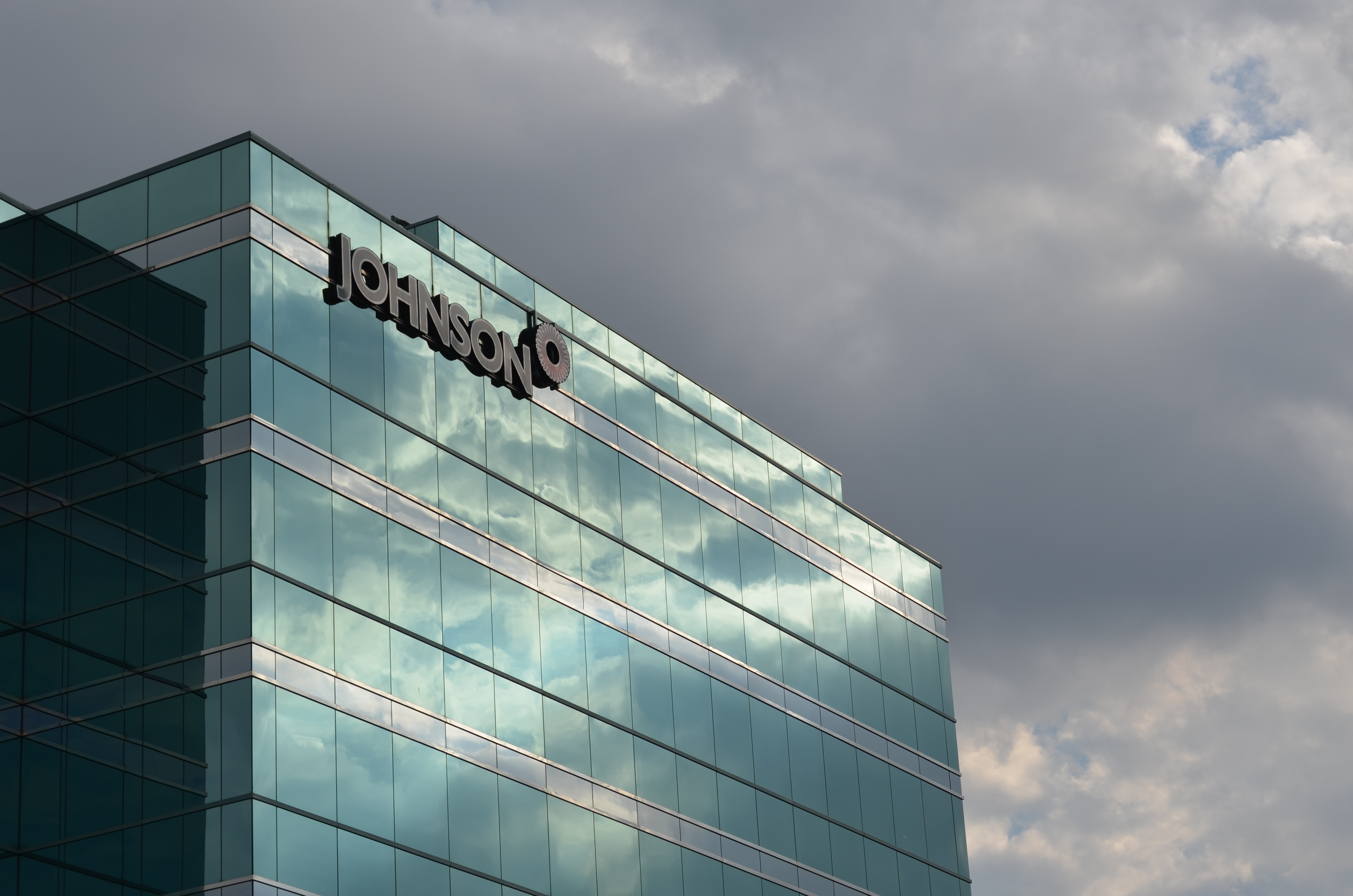
Johnson (owned by the RSA Group) office in Canada

RSA operates in 28 countries and provides insurance products and services in more than 140 through a global network of local partners. It has over 20 million customers around the world.

RSA owns the More Than direct home and pet insurance brand in the United Kingdom, recognised widely for its former Lucky The Dog advertisements and its "MORE IS ..." campaign. RSA also owns the Johnson brand in Canada, 123+ brand in Ireland, Trygg-Hansa brand in Sweden and Insurance Corporation brands in the UK.

== Controversies ==
Three former RSA Insurance Ireland staff were fined a combined £182,000 (€206,090) under sanctions tied to an investigation by a UK accounting watchdog into financial irregularities at the firm in 2012.

=== Asbestos liabilities ===
In January 2002, Royal & Sun Alliance became involved in litigation over claims for injury arising from asbestosis among workers in Clyde shipyards. The workers alleged that between 1972 and 1977 RSA had issued insurance certificates to asbestos manufacturer Turner & Newall but excluded cover for asbestosis, in breach of the Employers' Liability (Compulsory Insurance) Act 1969. RSA responded that asbestos-related injury was excluded from the policy because it was a risk the company was not willing to underwrite, that Turner & Newall was instead self-insured against asbestosis and should therefore be responsible for any compensation.

In February 2002, RSA set aside £384 million to double its reserves available for asbestos claims which, combined with claims of £215 million arising from the 11 September attacks, wiped out its 2001 profits. RSA put up seven of its subsidiaries for sale in an attempt to raise a further £800 million to cover liabilities for asbestos insurance claims in the United States. Friends Ivory & Sime subsequently acquired RSA's UK asset management subsidiary in May 2002 for £240 million. The situation was further compounded by RSA having to reserve £1.2 billion against liabilities for guaranteed annuities, the product which caused the collapse of Equitable Life, and was also facing a fine from the Financial Services Authority for failure to meet the deadline in the pension mis-selling review. Two months later, Friends Provident acquired RSA's offshore life unit International Financial Services Limited, based on the Isle of Man, for £133 million. In July 2002, RSA sold its group risk business to Canada Life for £60 million. RSA was forced to close its life business, with the loss of 1,200 jobs, in August 2002.

In November 2002, Turner & Newall launched a suit against RSA on behalf of former employees who had suffered asbestos-related disease, claiming that the insurer was liable because it provided employer liability policies to the engineering firm. In an effort to reduce costs, RSA chairman Sir Patrick Gillam said it would sell its US business RSUI and "float most of its Asia Pacific operations", bringing total job losses in the UK to 4000. The case was heard at the High Court of Justice in January 2003. RSA argued that a policy clause which excluded cover for pneumoconiosis also excluded other asbestos-related disease such as asbestosis and peritoneal mesothelioma. Colin Edelman QC, representing T&N, told Mr Justice Lawrence Collins that the defence which RSA had the "temerity" to put forward was "just ridiculous" and that the insurer was trying to "wriggle out of its liability". On 9 May 2003, the court ruled that RSA was liable for the compensation claims. In September 2003, RSA cut 1,000 jobs in the UK and asked shareholders for £960 million to cover further asbestos claims.

=== Inflated repair costs ===
In September 2011, Judge Platt of the Romford County Court in his judgement attacked the method in which RSA recovered their costs by putting a subsidiary within the motor claims process to inflate profits. Several insurers are now refusing to pay RSA's requests for payment without sight of the original invoice. On 15 June 2012, RSA Insurance was successful in a High Court ruling; the company said the ruling meant "its practices have been deemed legal and its stance vindicated". Within hours, Allianz Insurance lodged an appeal against RSA. Since then RSA has started to make bilateral agreements, the first announced on 29 June 2012 with Cooperative Insurance.

=== Hillsborough disaster ===
A fatal event at an English FA Cup match, widely known as the Hillsborough disaster, implicated RSA. A human crush resulted in 97 fatalities and 766 injured persons. The Royal Sun Alliance Insurance Company (which, as Sun Alliance, was the insurer for Sheffield Wednesday Football Club in 1989) refused to waive its entitlement to privilege, thus denying the Hillsborough Independent Panel access to its material. Strenuous efforts were made to persuade the company to allow the Panel confidential access to the material, but it maintained its refusal. RSA were entitled to do this as they are under no obligation to release information relating to the amount of compensation paid out to victims and families; in any case the release of that information would not have affected the result on who was to blame for the Hillsborough disaster.

== See also ==
- List of companies based in London
