= List of largest companies in Canada =

This article lists the largest companies in Canada by their revenue, net profit, and total assets, according to notable business sources including Fortune, Forbes, Wealth Awesome, and Global Database, a United Kingdom-based B2B data provider. These rankings highlight Canadian companies across various industries including banking, retail, and energy.

== 2024 Global Database list ==
This list is based on the Global Database, which ranks the largest publicly traded companies in Canada. The ranking considers reported 2024 financial results, including revenue, operating income, net income, total assets, and total equity for each company. The table below also lists the headquarters location and industry sector of each company. The figures represent the latest available data for the financial year 2023/24. The 10 highest ranked companies from Canada are listed.

Rank	Company	Revenue	Net income	Employees
1	Brookfield Corporation	↓ US $ 86.01 billion (2023)	↓ US $ 1.853 billion (2024)	250,000 (2024)
2	Alimentation Couche-Tard	↑ US $ 71.86 billion (2023)	↑ US $ 4.23 billion (2023)	149,000 (2024)
3	George Weston Limited	↑ CA $ 62.16 billion (2024)	↑ CA $ 1.32 billion (2024)	~60,000 (2024)
4	Loblaw Companies	↑ CA $ 59.53 billion (2024)	↑ CA $ 2.187 billion (2023)	↓ 220,000 (2023)
5	Royal Bank of Canada	↑ CA $ 57.34 billion (2024)	↑ CA $ 16.24 billion (2024)	94,838 (2024)
6	Cenovus Energy	↓ CA $ 52.204 billion (2023)	↓ CA $ 4.109 billion (2023)	6,925 (2023)
7	Magna International	↑ US $ 42.797 billion (2023)	US $ 1.213 billion (2023)	179,000 (2023)
8	Power Financial Corporation	↑ CA $ 42.38 billion (2024)	↑ CA $ 1.96 billion (2024)	30,000 (2024)
9	Toronto Dominion Bank	↑ CA $ 57.23 billion (2024)	↓ CA $ 8.84 billion (2024)	103,762 (2024)
10	Suncor Energy	↑ CA $ 52.206 billion (2023)	↑ CA $ 8.295 billion (2023)	14,906 (2023)

== 2024 Wealth Awesome List ==
Wealth Awesome published a list of the largest Canadian companies by revenue, based on data for the most recent fiscal year. Below is a selection of the top companies from the list.

Rank	Ticker	Company	Revenue (CAD) (Last 12 months)	Industry	Exchange
1	BN	Brookfield Corporation	97,664,999,424	Financial services	TSX
2	ATD	Alimentation Couche-Tard Inc.	71,917,797,376	Consumer Discretionary Distribution & Retail	TSX
3	WN	George Weston Limited	60,933,001,216	Consumer staples	TSX
4	L	Loblaw Companies Limited	60,596,998,144	Consumer staples	TSX
5	RY	Royal Bank of Canada	56,507,998,208	Banking	TSX
6	CVE	Cenovus Energy Inc.	55,665,000,448	Energy	TSX
7	TD	Toronto-Dominion Bank	52,309,000,192	Banking	TSX
8	IMO	Imperial Oil Ltd	51,819,999,232	Energy	TSX
9	SU	Suncor Energy Inc.	50,967,998,464	Energy	TSX
10	ENB	Enbridge Inc.	48,554,000,384	Energy	TSX

== 2023 Fortune list ==
This list displays all Canadian companies in the Fortune Global 500, which ranks the world's largest companies by annual revenue. The figures below are given in millions of US dollars and are for the fiscal year 2022. Also listed are the headquarters location, net profit, number of employees worldwide and industry sector of each company.

Rank	Fortune 500 rank	Name	Industry	Revenue (USD millions)	Profits (USD millions)	Employees	Headquarters
1	117	Brookfield Asset Management	Finance	92,769	2,056	202,500	Toronto
2	214	Alimentation Couche-Tard	Retail	62,810	2,683	122,000	Laval
3	270	Royal Bank of Canada	Banking	52,062	12,265	91,427	Montreal
4	277	Cenovus Energy	Oil and Gas	51,406	4,956	5,998	Calgary
5	294	Toronto-Dominion Bank	Banking	48,700	13,535	94,945	Toronto
6	327	Suncor Energy	Oil and Gas	44,928	6,975	16,558	Calgary
7	336	George Weston Limited	Retail	43,838	1,396	221,285	Toronto
8	365	Enbridge	Oil and Gas	40,964	2,308	12,050	Calgary
9	392	Nutrien	Agriculture	37,884	7,660	24,700	Saskatoon
10	394	Magna International	Automotive parts	37,840	592	158,000	Aurora
11	399	Power Corporation of Canada	Finance	37,419	1,510	37,300	Montreal
12	415	Scotiabank	Banking	36,390	7,701	90,979	Toronto
13	433	Bank of Montreal	Banking	34,730	10,513	46,722	Montreal
14	471	Canadian Natural Resources	Oil and Gas	32,503	8,404	10,035	Calgary

== 2019 Forbes list ==
This list is based on the Forbes Global 2000, which ranks the world's 2,000 largest publicly traded companies. The Forbes list takes into account a multitude of factors, including the revenue, net profit, total assets and market value of each company; each factor is given a weighted rank in terms of importance when considering the overall ranking. The location of each company's headquarters and its industry sector are also listed in the table below.The figures are in billions of US dollars and are for the year 2018. All 56 companies from Canada are listed.

Rank	Forbes 2000 rank	Name	Headquarters	Revenue (billions US$)	Profit (billions US$)	Assets (billions US$)	Value (billions US$)	Industry
1	41	Royal Bank of Canada	Montreal	46.3	9.6	1,040.3	114.9	Banking
2	46	Toronto-Dominion Bank	Toronto	42.5	8.7	1,007.0	103.8	Banking
3	87	Scotiabank	Toronto	32.4	6.4	787.5	67.1	Banking
4	118	Brookfield Asset Management	Toronto	57.6	3.6	256.3	46.0	Finance
5	134	Bank of Montreal	Montreal	26.2	4.6	614.2	50.4	Banking
6	166	Manulife	Toronto	28.4	3.7	517.8	36.2	Insurance
7	174	Enbridge	Calgary	36.1	2.2	122.2	75.3	Oil and Gas
8	190	Canadian Imperial Bank of Commerce	Toronto	20.2	3.9	486.0	36.8	Banking
9	229	Suncor Energy	Calgary	29.7	2.5	65.6	52.6	Oil and Gas
10	273	Sun Life Financial	Toronto	23.4	2.0	196.0	24.5	Insurance
11	341	Bell Canada	Montreal	18.1	2.3	41.8	40.9	Telecommunication
12	342	Canadian Natural Resources	Calgary	16.2	2.0	53.9	37.6	Oil and Gas
13	346	TC Energy	Calgary	10.3	2.9	72.4	43.2	Oil and Gas
14	364	Alimentation Couche-Tard	Laval	59.7	2.0	22.2	33.7	Retail
15	388	Canadian National Railway	Montreal	11.0	3.3	30.5	67.9	Transportation
16	397	Power Corporation of Canada	Montreal	40.0	1.0	326.7	11.4	Finance
17	427	Magna International	Aurora	40.8	2.3	25.9	18.3	Automotive parts
18	501	National Bank of Canada	Montreal	8.4	1.7	200.5	15.9	Banking
19	566	Rogers Communications	Toronto	11.6	1.6	23.4	26.6	Telecommunication
20	623	Teck Resources	Vancouver	9.7	2.4	29.0	14.1	Mining
21	625	Telus	Vancouver	10.9	1.2	24.2	22.4	Telecommunication
22	674	Husky Energy	Calgary	17.1	1.1	26.6	10.9	Oil and Gas
23	678	Nutrien	Saskatoon	19.6	0.0	45.5	32.3	Agriculture
24	744	George Weston Limited	Toronto	37.5	0.4	32.1	11.7	Retail
25	766	Fairfax Financial	Toronto	18.2	0.4	64.4	13.7	Insurance
26	771	Fortis Inc.	St. John's	6.5	0.9	39.9	16.1	Utilities
27	828	Canadian Pacific Railway	Calgary	5.6	1.5	15.7	30.3	Transportation
28	897	Pembina Pipeline	Calgary	5.8	1.0	19.5	19.0	Oil and Gas
29	974	CGI Inc.	Montreal	9.0	0.9	9.4	19.5	IT services
30	985	Cenovus Energy	Calgary	16.1	−2.2	26.3	12.4	Oil and Gas
31	1035	Thomson Reuters	Toronto	5.5	0.5	17.0	30.1	Media
32	1043	Intact Financial	Toronto	8.0	0.5	20.2	11.6	Insurance
33	1056	Onex Corporation	Toronto	25.1	−0.6	45.4	6.0	Finance
34	1072	Restaurant Brands International	Toronto	5.4	0.6	20.1	17.1	Restaurants
35	1084	Barrick Gold	Toronto	7.3	−1.6	22.6	23.2	Mining
36	1134	Encana	Calgary	5.5	1.1	15.3	10.8	Oil and Gas
37	1158	Saputo Inc.	Montreal	10.0	0.6	7.4	13.3	Food processing
38	1191	IA Financial Group	Quebec City	8.1	0.5	45.8	4.2	Insurance
39	1275	Waste Connections	Vaughan	4.9	0.5	12.6	23.3	Waste management
40	1292	Bausch Health	Laval	8.4	−4.3	32.5	8.1	Pharmaceuticals
41	1310	Bombardier Inc.	Montreal	16.2	0.2	25.0	5.0	Aerospace and defense
42	1317	Metro Inc.	Montreal	12.2	0.5	8.0	9.4	Retail
43	1341	Emera	Halifax	4.9	0.6	23.7	8.9	Utilities
44	1365	Alectra	Mississauga	4.8	0.6	19.4	9.6	Utilities
45	1396	Canadian Tire	Toronto	10.8	0.5	12.7	6.9	Retail
46	1480	Lululemon Athletica	Vancouver	3.3	0.5	2.1	22.5	Retail
47	1578	Air Canada	Montreal	13.9	0.1	14.1	6.6	Airline
48	1586	First Quantum Minerals	Toronto	4.1	0.4	23.5	8.2	Mining
49	1717	Empire Company	Stellarton	19.0	0.3	7.1	6.0	Conglomerate
50	1738	Shopify	Ottawa	1.1	−0.1	2.3	24.4	E-commerce
51	1744	Advanz Pharma	Mississauga	0.5	1.5	1.8	0.8	Pharmaceuticals
52	1757	Constellation Software	Toronto	3.1	0.4	2.9	18.7	IT services
53	1805	Canadian Utilities	Calgary	3.4	0.5	16.0	7.6	Utilities
54	1940	Laurentian Bank of Canada	Montreal	1.4	0.2	34.4	1.3	Banking
55	1975	Goldcorp	Vancouver	3.0	−4.2	17.0	9.4	Mining
56	1978	CAPREIT	Toronto	0.5	0.9	7.9	5.5	Real estate

== See also ==
- List of companies of Canada
- List of largest public companies in Canada by profit
- List of largest companies by revenue
- List of the largest trading partners of Canada
