= Tryg =

Insurance company

Tryg A/S
- Type: Publicly traded Aktieselskab
- Traded as: Nasdaq Copenhagen: TRYG
- Industry: Insurance
- Founded: 2002; 24 years ago
- Headquarters: Copenhagen, Denmark
- Area served: Northern Europe; Central Europe; Eastern Europe; Israel; Turkey; Russia; Greece; Cyprus; Caucasus; Central Asia; Pakistan; Vietnam
- Key people: Morten Hübbe; CEO
- Products: General insurance services
- Website: tryg.com

Tryg A/S is a Scandinavian insurance company present in Denmark, Norway, Sweden and Finland. The company is the largest provider of general insurance services in the Nordic countries and is listed on Nasdaq OMX Copenhagen.

== History ==
The current company was created in 2002 through the merging of Tryg Forsikring and Nordea's insurance activities. The company was listed on the Copenhagen stock exchange in October 2005. Tryg Forsikring traced its history back to the foundation of Kjøbenhavns Brandforsikring in 1731.

Morten Hübbe replaced Stine Bosse as CEO on 1 February 2011.

In November 2020, Canadian insurer Intact Financial Corporation and Tryg announced a joint offer to acquire RSA Insurance Group. This would represent an approximately £7.2 billion transaction with Intact paying £3.0 billion and Tryg paying £4.2 billion. Intact would retain RSA's Canada and UK & International operations and obligations, Tryg would retain RSA's Sweden and Norway operations, and Intact and Tryg would co-own RSA's Denmark operations. The closing of the acquisition is expected to occur in the second quarter of 2021 subject to receipt of approval from the relevant regulatory and antitrust authorities and the satisfaction or (where capable of waiver) waiver of other conditions to closing.

In May 2022, it was announced Tryg and Intact Financial had sold their Codan Forsikring A/S's Danish subsidiary ― Codan Denmark to Alm. Brand A/S Group.
