= Humanitarian response by for-profit organisations to the 2010 Haiti earthquake =

This article describes humanitarian responses from "for-profit" organizations, such as business corporations, following the January 12, 2020 earthquake in Haiti.

== Africa ==
=== Kenya ===
In coordination with the Kenya Red Cross, Kenya Airways—the country's largest airline and flag carrier—raised money for earthquake relief efforts by collecting donations on local and international flights.

== Asia ==
=== Israel ===
- Teva Pharmaceutical Industries, an international pharmaceutical company headquartered in Israel which was the world's largest generic drug manufacturer at the time, donated over $7 million worth of medication.

=== Japan ===
- Daiichi Sankyo, a major international drug manufacturer based in Japan, donated pharmaceutical products worth approximately US$1,600,000. The company also gave approximately US$54,000 to the Japanese Red Cross, and US$50,000 to the American Red Cross, to support their humanitarian responses.
- Several Japan-based automobile manufacturers made monetary donations. Nissan gave a donation exceeding US$100,000, while Toyota gave a half million dollars (US$500,000).
- Tokyo-based Canon, the multinational manufacturer of imaging and optical products, contributedUS$220,000.

=== Pakistan ===
- ARY Digital Network, a subsidiary of the Dubai-based holding group The ARY Group, pledged a cash donation of over US$100,000. The Network also provided over US$100,000 worth of water, medical supplies, and other necessary goods, while sending a relief team composed of doctors, social workers, and reporters to affected areas.

== Europe ==
=== Azerbaijan ===
- Azersun Holding sent humanitarian aid through the United Nations Development Programme.

=== Finland ===
- Finnish communications multinational Nokia contributed US$200,000.

=== Germany ===
- Several days after the earthquake, Deutsche Bank announced that it would donate 100 percent of net US agency equity trading commissions on January 15 to the humanitarian cause. The initiative raised approximately US$4,000,000.
- Deutsche Post DHL sent one of its Disaster Response Teams, which are deployed free of charge, at the request of the United Nations Office for the Coordination of Humanitarian Affairs (OCHA), to airports in disaster-affected areas to assist with the logistics of coordinating relief supplies. Following the earthquake, OCHA deployed a Disaster Response Team to help manage the large influx of relief supplies by supporting key logistical efforts like warehousing and inventory, and managing incoming supplies effectively in order to prevent bottlenecking at the airport and ensure that badly needed medical and other relief supplies would keep moving.

=== Netherlands ===
Various Dutch organizations raised money for the Samenwerkende Hulporganisaties (Giro 555), a cooperative effort of aid organizations:

- Radio 538, Radio 2, 3FM, Q-Music, SLAM!FM and Radio Veronica broadcast a joint special from 6:00 am to 11:00 pm on January 22, under the name Radio 555. Discovery Network Europe also participated in raising funds for Giro 555, by placing a ticker requesting donations on top of their regular broadcasts on Discovery Channel and Animal Planet.
- Following the radio special, the Dutch public television station Nederland 1, and various commercial stations (RTL 4, SBS6, and TMF) broadcast a joint evening special under the name "Nederland helpt Haïti" (The Netherlands helps Haiti). By day's end, the joint specials had raised over €41 million. This sum was doubled by the Dutch government, raising the total to over €83.4 million (US$118 million). Later, another €18.6 million was raised, bringing the total Dutch contribution to €100.6 million (US$140 million).
- On January 22, an extended-length episode of Jeugdjournaal was broadcast on all public and commercial cable networks aimed at younger audiences, such as the Disney Channel and Nickelodeon.
- The Dutch retail and pharmacy chain Kruidvat donated US$141.000.
- Customers of ING, an international financial institution of Dutch origin, donated US$596,926. Immediately after the earthquake, the company itself contributed €30,000 from the ING Group Disaster Relief Fund to the Red Cross to provide emergency items, such as blankets, water containers and cooking equipment. Immediately after the earthquake, the company itself contributed €30,000 from the ING Group Disaster Relief Fund to the Red Cross, to provide emergency items—including blankets, water containers, and cooking equipment.
- Unilever, a British-Dutch multinational corporation which owns a number of global food and home product brands, donated US$500.000.
- Deloitte, the world's largest private professional services organization, contributed US$42,428.
- TNT NV, an international express and mail delivery company headquartered in the Netherlands, participated in sending an Emergency Response Team. As part of an ongoing collaboration with the World Food Programme, TNT partnered with UPS and Agility to send a "logistics emergency team" to assist the WFP in coordinating relief supplies and disaster response efforts.

=== Sweden ===
- Ericsson - Ericsson was requested by the United Nations to deploy their Ericsson Response team.

=== Switzerland ===
- Novartis contributed 2.5 million dollars in emergency aid.

=== United Kingdom ===
- HSBC donated £1m to SOS Children.
- Unilever donated $500,000 to the United Nations World Food Programme.
- British Airways and Virgin Atlantic flew medics, rescuers and supplies free of charge, and British Airways also pledged £300,000 (US$488,000).
- Channel 4 announced that the proceeds from the 2010 series of Celebrity Big Brother phone-in votes would be donated towards the Disasters Emergency Committee's aid effort.
- Diageo donated 45,000 pounds of food and emergency supplies.

== North America ==
=== Aruba ===
- Setar Aruba, a telecommunications company, donated money raised customers who text the word "Haiti" to their call line, producing about $3 per text.
- Digicel Aruba, a telecommunications company, donated $100,000 to a relief fund, and is also donating 100 percent of proceeds from all customers who text the word "Help" to a call line that has been set up for the relief effort.
- MetaCorp, an Aruba-based holding company, donated about $28,000 to Red Cross relief efforts.
- Burger King in Aruba donated roughly $3,000.
- De Schakel College, a private school on the island, was organizing fund raising activities and collecting clothing and supplies.

=== Canada ===
- Aeroplan, a frequent flyer program, donated 1 million Aeroplan miles to the Canadian Red Cross and 1 million to Médecins Sans Frontières, and allowed members to donate miles to either. It matched employee cash donations to the Canadian Red Cross.
- Air Canada, the Canadian flag carrier airline, dispatched a dedicated relief flight from Montreal to Port-au-Prince carrying a full load of humanitarian supplies and about 100 search and rescue technicians from the Service de Police de la Ville de Montréal (SPVM), the Service de sécurité incendie de Montréal (SIM), and the Sûreté du Québec
- Air Transat donated $25,000 to the Red Cross and $25,000 to SOS Children's Villages.
- The Bank of Montreal announced a donation of CAN$250,000 to the Canadian Red Cross. CEO Bill Downe stated, "The devastation in Haiti is massive, and all of us at BMO are deeply saddened by the news." The bank also appealed to its 36,000 employees to make donations. It waived fees on fund transfers to agencies or individuals in Haiti.
- The Bank of Nova Scotia donated $250,000 to the Canadian Red Cross.
- BC Liquor Store donated over $345,000 to help support Canadian Red Cross relief efforts.
- The Canadian Imperial Bank of Commerce donating $100,000 and waived transaction fees on donations.
- Canadian National Railway donated $100,000 to the Canadian Red Cross and is matching employee donations.
- Canadian Tire will send tents, sleeping bags, flashlights and batteries to Haiti, and sell additional merchandise for the aid effort at cost.
- The Co-operators will match $150,000 in donations
- Desjardins Group has pledged $300,000.
- First Air, along with the Belinda Stronach Foundation, has donated 2 Lockheed L-382 Hercules aircraft as well as a Boeing 767-200 'Super Freighter' to carry out rescue and relief missions. As of 19 January, the airline's two Hercules aircraft had flown five loads, or 160,000 lbs worth of aid.
- Gildan Activewear donated $50,000 to the Red Cross.
- Home Hardware donated $25,000 to the Mennonite Central Committee for Haitian earthquake relief.
- The Hudson's Bay Company donated $200,000 to the Canadian Red Cross.
- Hydro-Québec sent a team of professionals including doctors, nurses, firefighters and police officers and other officials.
- IKEA Canada donated $50,000
- Intact Financial donated $50,000 to the Canadian Red Cross.
- The National Bank of Canada donated $150,000 to the Canadian Red Cross, and will match employee and public donations to an additional $100,000.
- The Potash Corporation of Saskatchewan pledged C$500,000, to be split equally between the Canadian Red Cross and Care Canada. Potash Corp. has also pledged it would match employee contributions. (Competitor The Mosaic Company (U.S. based, but with significant Canadian operations) has also committed US$$500,000. See U.S. section for details.)
- Rogers Communications announced a donation of CAN$250,000, in addition to providing subscribers with a means of donating through their cellphones.
- The Royal Bank of Canada, the parent company of the Royal Bank of Trinidad and Tobago, has pledged a US$100,000 donation to the Red Cross.
- Scotiabank which has 4 bank branches in Haiti contributed CAD$250,000 to the Red Cross.
- Shopper's Drug Mart donated $100,000 in cash and supplies including water, first aid and personal care items.
- Sunwing Airlines, a tour operator, provided free seating up to a value of $50,000 for humanitarian and rescue workers on its flights between Montreal and Haiti.
- TD Bank donated $100,000.
- Tim Hortons donated $100,000 to UNICEF.
- The Toronto Rock donated $17,000, $1000 for each goal scored against the Rochester Knighthawks on January 23, 2010.
- TransForce, a transportation company, donated $50,000.
- Wal-Mart Canada donated $100,000 and accepting donations at all 314 stores nationwide.
- WestJet donated $100,000 to the Canadian Red Cross. It donated a charter flight to Port-au-Prince to carry relief supplies. It also made cargo space available for relief supplies on scheduled flights to Miami.

=== Jamaica ===
- The Jamaican telecommunications company Digicel, which is a major mobile phone provider in Haiti, pledged US$5 million to support aid agencies and to help repair the damaged phone network.

=== United States ===
- Alaska Airlines Donated US$50,000 and 2 million frequent flier miles to Angel Flight West to aid relief efforts and matched Mileage Plan donations.
- Allstate donated US$50,000.
- Aetna Insurance company pledged grants of US$10,000 to organizations.
- AIG—employee fundraiser for relief efforts
- American Airlines operated relief flights and allowed employees and customers to donate miles with a company match.
- Apple Inc. allowed donations through the iTunes Store to the American Red Cross in $5, $10, $20, $50, $100 and $200 denominations.
- AT&T donated US$50,000 to Télécoms sans frontières.
- Bank of America announced a $1 million commitment to aid victims in Haiti. The commitment included a $500,000 grant to the American Red Cross for the Haitian Relief and Development Fund.
- Bristol-Myers Squibb donated antibiotics and a total of US$200,000 to The Catholic Medical Mission Board, The American Red Cross, and Partners in Health. It continued its policy of matching 100% of employee charitable contributions, and increased the match to 200% for certain Haitian relief organizations.
- Broadway League donated US$100,000.
- Bungie - As of February 11, the game developer had raised a total of $150,000 through Halo 3 players using a particular emblem in matchmaking, as well as the profits from their online store.
- Burger King donated US$50,000.
- Continental Airlines matched mileage contributions.
- Cigna donated US$50,000.
- Comcast donated US$1,000,000.
- Delta Air Lines operated relief flights and allowed customers to donate miles.
- Dow Chemical Company donated US$500,000 and matched employee contributions up to $250,000 in combined donations.
- Enterprise Rent-a-Car pledged US$100,000 to the American Red Cross.
- General Motors donated US$100,000 and 100 percent of the proceeds from the auction of the limited-edition 2008 Chevrolet Corvette which was the last of 427 cars built specifically for North America and the only 2008 Z06 available in Crystal Red Metallic paint.
- Go Daddy contributed US$500,000.
- Google pledged US$1 million.
- The Hollywood Foreign Press Association, the organization behind the Golden Globe Awards, donated US$100,000 to Wyclef Jean's Yele Haiti relief fund.
- Home Depot contributed US$100,000.
- Intel had given US$250,000, plus in-kind contributions and matching employee donations add up to US$1.08M as of January 20, 2010.
- JetBlue allowed mileage donated by customers to go to the American Red Cross.
- JPMorgan Chase donated US$1,000,000 and encouraged employee involvement.
- Kroger Company collected donations at Frys, Ralphs, and other grocery stores.
- Major League Baseball donated $1 million.
- McDonald's contributed $500,000.
- Microsoft Corporation pledged 1.25 million.
- MoneyGram International Inc. lowered its transfer charge to US$1 for payments sent to Haiti, and awarded a US$10,000 grant to the Pan American Development Foundation.
- The Mosaic Company $500,000, including $125,000 to each of Canadian Red Cross, American Red Cross, International Red Cross, and American Refugee Committee. Also matched employee donations dollar for dollar.
- MTV Networks group produced a two-hour telethon, Hope for Haiti, which aired on MTV and many other networks in the US and Canada as a fundraiser for UNICEF, the Red Cross and other organisations.
- Nestle - $1,000,000 in bottled water.
- New York Yankees pledged US$250,000.
- News Corporation pledged US$250,000 and to match—dollar for dollar—contributions made by United States-based employees, up to US$250,000 for the following four weeks.
- National Symphony Orchestra in tandem with the Kennedy Center, solicited donations for the American Red Cross via the Kennedy Center website; along with proceeds from the orchestra's January 22, 2010 concert, to the United States Agency for International Development.
- PepsiCodonated US$1,000,000 as well as bottled water and Gatorade.
- Procter & Gamble donated US$400,000 and 3,000,000 packets of water purifier.
- Risk and Insurance Management Society donated US$10,000 to the American Red Cross.
- Royal Caribbean Cruises Ltd. received criticism for allowing its cruise liners to dock at private beaches in Labadee on Haiti's north coast during the immediate aftermath of the earthquake. However, the company defended the decision by offering to carry food aid onboard and also pledged to donate at least US$1 million plus all profits from Labadee-bound liners.
- St. Louis Symphony Orchestra donated 5% of its single-ticket revenue from two weekends' worth of orchestral series concerts to the American Red Cross. The organisation also made Red Cross envelopes available at the concerts for people to provide personal donations.
- Safeway Canada and US provided relief in excess of $100k. US Safeway also donated $100k to Red Cross and UNICEF.
- ShopRite donated US$250,000.
- Southwest Airlines allowed donations of customer awards.
- Spirit Airlines providing aid along with American Airlines, and matched customers mileage contributions.
- Starbucks donated US$1,000,000 to the American Red Cross.
- Stop and shop donated US$100,000 and allowed donations at its registers.
- Tampa Bay Rays donated US$35,000.
- T-Mobile waived fees on bills to all T-Mobile customers for calls to Haiti and made roaming in Haiti free retroactive to 2010-01-12.
- Target Corporation donated US$500,000 and over 1 million meals and allows donations at its registers.
- TNA Wrestling donation requests were made during the January 18–20 taping of TNA iMPACT! at Universal Studios Orlando in Florida. The collected funds were allocated to the International Disaster Relief Fund administered by the Central Florida headquarters of the American Red Cross.
- United Airlines enabled and matched mileage contributions.
- UnitedHealth Group#UnitedHealthcare contributed US$100k to American Red Cross
- UPS donated US$1 million.
- US Airways allowed donations of mileage earned on Dividend miles. In addition, company will match funds up to 25k USD.
- Verizon Communications Foundation awarded US$100,000 in grants to World Vision and Food for the Poor, and it matched 1-to-1 every dollar (up to $1,000 per employee) donated by Verizon employees to the two approved non-profit organisations .
- Vonage offered free 10-minute telephone calls from the US to Haiti through a toll-free number.
- The Walt Disney Company donated US$100,000.
- Walgreens donated over $1 million from voluntary donations from customers at Walgreens pharmacies.
- Wal-Mart donated US$600,000 and allowed donations at its cash registers.
- Winn-Dixie donated US$200,000 and, allowed customers to donate at registers (.50 cents to $500).
- World Council of Credit Unions collected $206,161 in donations during the first week following the earthquake. A team from the council went to Haiti to assist in the delivery of supplies and aid.
- Yum! Brands, the parent company of KFC, Pizza Hut, and Taco Bell, donated US$500,000 to Haitian relief, they will also be giving over 10 tons of food from both KFC and Taco Bell to the victims.
- Zynga, a social network gaming company, raised US$1,500,000 by offering special limited edition in-game collectibles in its most popular games such as FarmVille. FarmVille users alone raised over US$1,000,000.

== Oceania ==
=== Australia ===
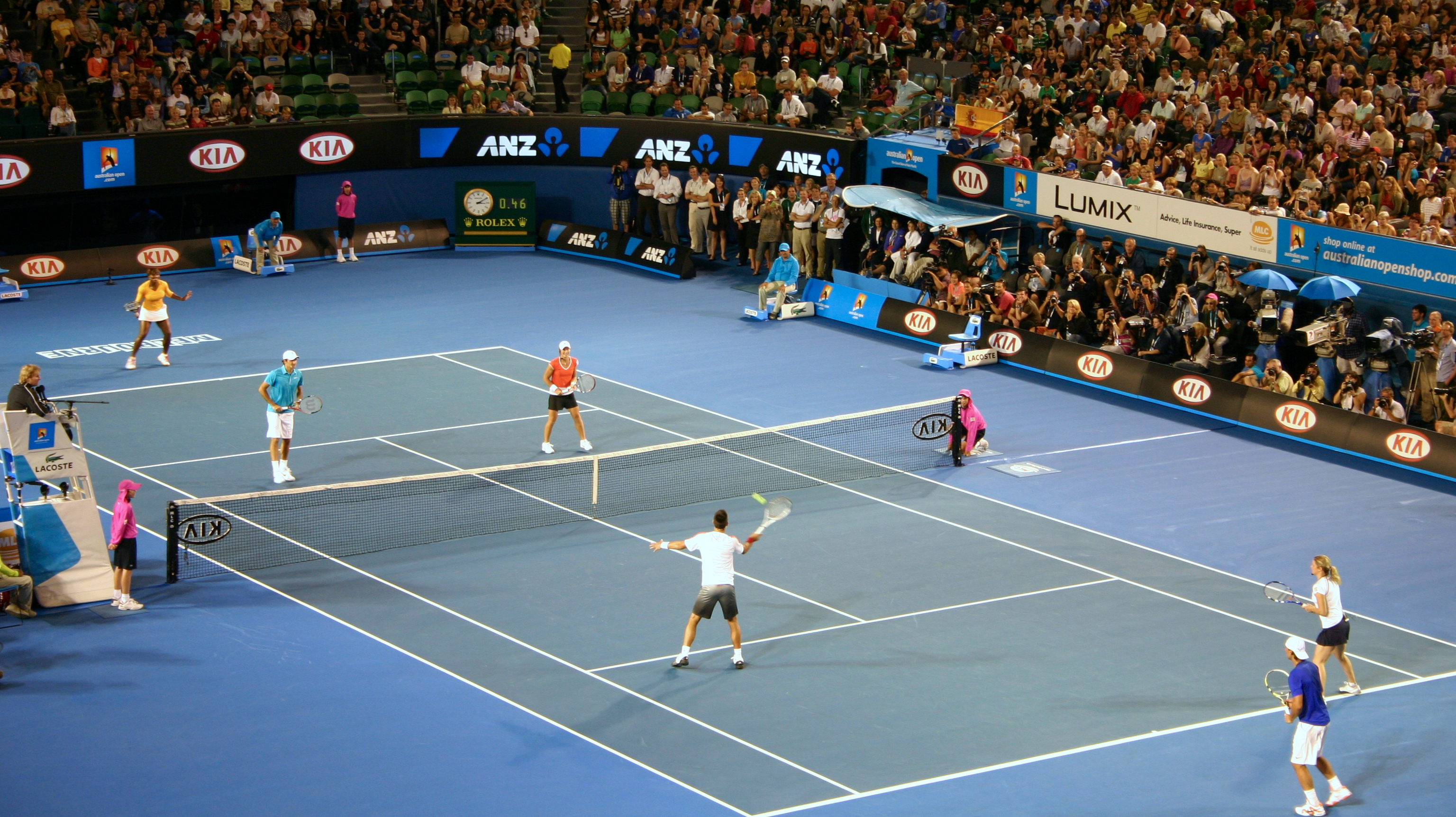
Triples play during the "Hit for Haiti" charity event held prior to the 2010 Australian Open

- Organisers of the 2010 Australian Open, a day prior to the tournament opening, held a quickly organised event called "Hit for Haiti" conceived by tennis star Roger Federer to raise funds. Eight players participated, in two teams (named for the colours in the Haitian flag), and wore microphones during play. The Red Team consisted of Federer, Serena Williams, Lleyton Hewitt, and Samantha Stosur. The Blue Team was Rafael Nadal, Novak Djokovic, Andy Roddick, and Kim Clijsters. Over US$185,000 was raised from the event.

=== Fiji ===
- Fiji Water donated 136,000 litres (30,000 imp gal; 36,000 US gal) of bottled water.
