= Intact Financial =

Canadian insurance company

Intact Financial Corporation
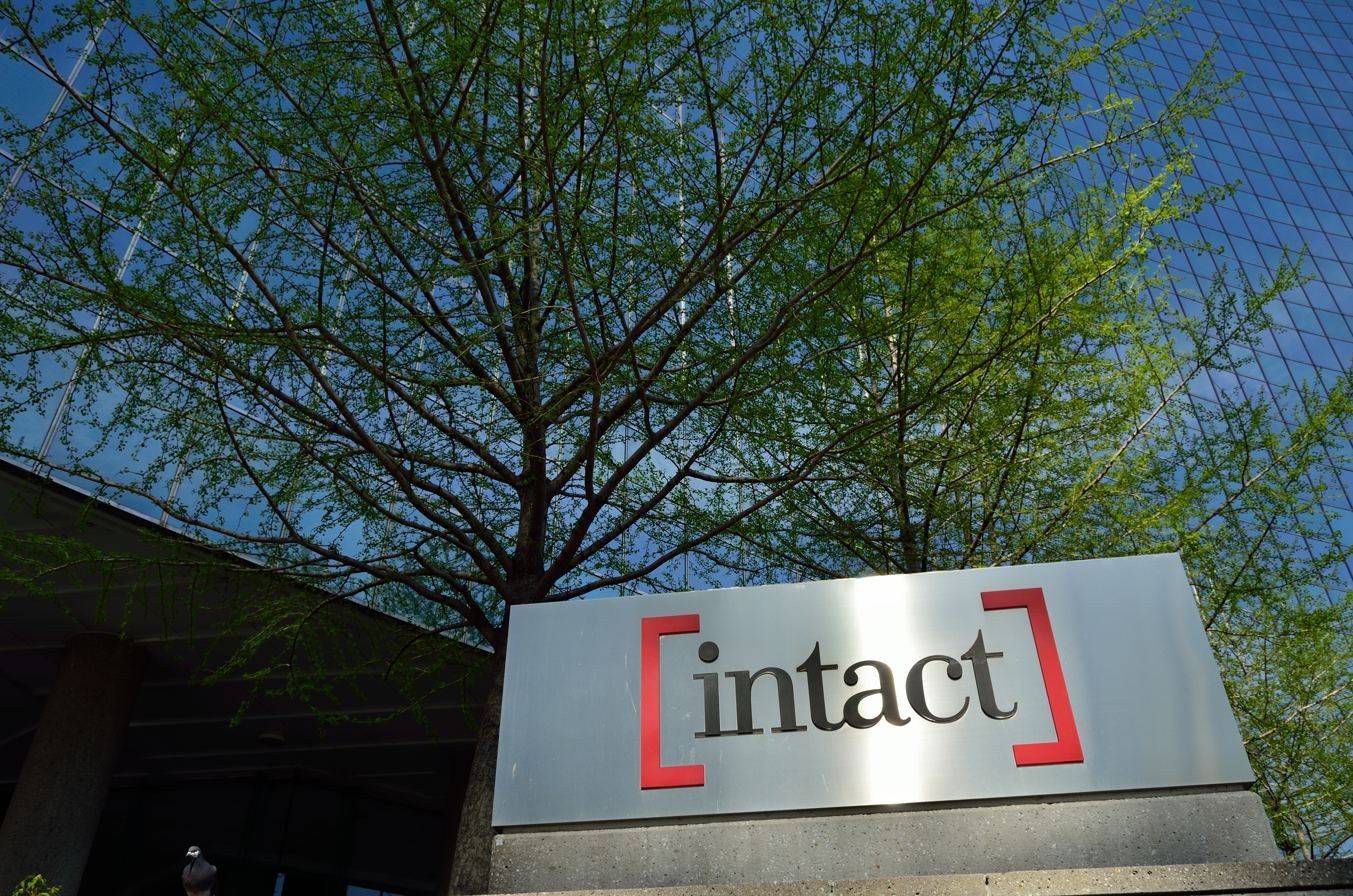
- Intact Financial office with current logo
- Formerly: ING Canada Inc. (2004–2009)
- Type: Public
- Traded as: TSX: IFC; S&P/TSX 60 component
- Industry: Insurance
- Founded: 2009
- Headquarters: Intact Centre, Toronto, Ontario, Canada
- Key people: William Young (chairman); Charles Brindamour (CEO)
- Products: Property and casualty insurance, insurance brokerage
- Operating income: ▲CA$4.48 billion (2024)
- Net income: ▲CA$3.37 billion (2025)
- Total equity: ▲CA$48 billion (2024)
- Number of employees: 32,000 (2026)
- Website: intactfc.com

Intact Financial Corporation (IFC) is a Canadian general insurance holding company. Currently the largest provider of property and casualty insurance in Canada, it also has insurance operations in the UK, Ireland, Europe, and United States. The company was formed in 2009, when it also went public on the Toronto Stock Exchange. It operates a number of subsidiaries and brands, such as Intact Insurance, belairdirect, BrokerLink, Intact Prestige, Intact Public Entities, On Side Restoration, Jiffy, 123.ie, and Intact Insurance Specialty Solutions. In 2024, Intact Financial had a market cap of CA$48 billion.

== History ==
=== Predecessor companies (1959-2008) ===
The predecessor company to Intact Financial was founded as the Halifax Fire Insurance Association in 1809. Offering fire insurance for homes in Halifax, it was later renamed the Halifax Insurance Company. In the late 1950s, Dutch insurer Nationale-Nederlanden (NN) expanded into Canada by acquiring the Halifax Insurance Company; Dutch immigration to Canada attracted NN to the country. The acquisition was completed in 1959.

In 1987, the Halifax Insurance Agency acquired the Western Union Insurance Company of Calgary, Alberta. NN in 1989 acquired Commassur Inc., which owned Belair Insurance Company and Groupe Commerce, both in Quebec. NN merged with NMB Postbank in 1991 to create ING Group, one of the first bank assurance groups. ING Group combined its four Canadian insurance subsidiaries in 1993, creating ING Canada. ING Canada acquired Guardian Insurance in 1998, and, in 2001, it acquired the Canadian insurance portfolio of the Swiss insurer Zurich, Zurich Canada.

In 2001, Claude Dussault became ING Canada's president and CEO. In July 2003, ING Insurance Company of Canada and ING Western Union Insurance Company were combined, creating the ING Insurance Company of Canada. ING Canada acquired Allianz Canada in 2004. Also in 2004, ING Canada made a public offering on the Toronto Stock Exchange, with ING Group retaining 73% ownership. The IPO ended up raising CA$907 million. Charles Brindamour became CEO of ING Canada in 2008. He succeeded Claude Dussault, who became chairman.

=== Intact Financial founding (2009-2016) ===
Older logo

ING decided to pull out of Canada in 2009, selling its Canadian banking and insurance operations in the process. In February 2009, ING sold its entire 70% stake in ING Canada, raising CA$1.9 billion in share sales on the Toronto Stock Exchange. ING Canada changed its name to reflect the change in ownership, and on March 10, 2009, the newly independent ING Insurance Company of Canada became Intact Insurance Company. That year, Intact went public on the Toronto Stock Exchange.

Intact Financial Corporation acquired Axa Canada for CA$2.6 billion in 2011 with Axa Insurance (Canada) then amalgamated into Intact Insurance Company in early 2014. In 2012, Intact acquired Jevco Insurance Company for $530 million. In 2014, it then acquired Metro General Insurance Corporation, which operated largely in Newfoundland and Labrador, for CA$27 million. In 2014, Brindamour created a dedicated claims team for natural disasters, which started with around 3,000 employees. For CA$189 million, in 2015, Intact Financial acquired Canadian Direct Insurance Incorporated (CDI), extending its direct-to-consumer operations. CDI was later integrated with belairdirect. In 2016, Intact purchased InnovAssur for CA$50 million.

=== Acquisitions (2017-2020) ===
By 2017, Intact was the largest provider of property and casualty insurance in Canada, as measured by annual premiums. In 2017, an Ontario court awarded punitive damages against Intact Insurance in a fire-loss dispute. In 2017, Intact acquired OneBeacon Insurance Group, an American specialty insurer, for CA$2.3 billion. Intact announced in 2018 that it would invest CA$3 million in the autonomous vehicle startup Voyage, as well as insuring self-driving vehicles in The Villages, Florida, a large retirement community.

Intact acquired two companies from Princeton Holdings in late 2019: the specialty insurer The Guarantee Company of North America, as well as the Frank Cowan Company Limited, a specialty insurance managing general agent. Frank Cowan in 2021 was renamed Intact Public Entities. In 2020, Intact was among the insurers named in class actions over COVID-19 business interruption coverage in Canada. Also in 2020, Intact acquired the Canadian property restoration company On Side Restoration. In October 2020, Intact rebranded its U.S. operations as Intact Insurance Specialty Solutions (formerly operating as OneBeacon Insurance Group and The Guarantee Company of North America). Intact Financial's annual revenue in 2020 was CA$12.14 billion, operating income was CA$1.92 billion, while its net income was CA$1,082 million, assets were CA$35.12 billion, and estimated equity was CA$9.58 billion.

=== Recent developments (2021-2026) ===
On June 1, 2021, Intact and the Danish insurer Tryg A/S jointly acquired RSA Insurance Group, with Intact paying CA$5.1 billion for a number of RSA divisions. The acquisition expanded Intact Financial's operations into the UK, Ireland, and Europe and gave Intact five million new customers, adding to the six million it already had in Canada. Intact also gained 9,900 employees, 5,000 of whom were in the UK. Intact and Tryg A/S sold their subsidiary, Codan Denmark, to Alm. Brand A/S Group in May 2022. The following year, Intact Financial acquired certain operations from Direct Line Insurance Group.

In 2024, it acquired the Canadian home maintenance app Jiffy Inc. and invested $500 million in technology, including AI. Intact Financial had a market cap of CA$48 billion in 2024. It also had CA$22.4 billion in annual premiums, a significant increase from $4.3 billion in 2009. Intact Insurance began sponsoring the Professional Women's Hockey League in November 2024, signing a multi-year contract. In March 2025, Intact became a sponsor of the Northern Super League, and partnered with three teams: the Montreal Roses, Ottawa Rapid FC, and AFC Toronto. At the time, Intact Financial also sponsored the Montreal Canadiens, Speed Skating Canada and operated the Centre de glaces Intact Assurance in Quebec City. In 2025, Intact Financial Corporation rebranded its RSA and NIG brands into Intact Insurance in the UK, Ireland, and Europe. In doing so, the RSA brand name was retired, with NIG and Farmweb rolled into the new brand as well.

== Operations ==
Intact Financial Corporation is the largest property and casualty insurer in Canada, and also has insurance operations in the UK, Ireland, Europe, and the United States. By 2026, the company had 350 offices and 31,000 employees, up from 29,000 employees in 2023. Its operating income in 2024 was CA$4.48 billion. Net income in 2025 was CA$3.37 billion, up from $2.31 billion in 2024 and $1.33 billion in 2023.

=== Brands and subsidiaries ===
Intact Financial's website in 2026 listed a number of active brands. In Canada, that includes Intact Insurance, belairdirect, BrokerLink, Intact Prestige, Intact Insurance Specialty Solutions, Intact Public Entities, On Side Restoration, and Jiffy. In the UK and Europe, it operates Intact Insurance UK, Intact Insurance EU, and Intact Insurance IE, as well as 123.ie. In the United States, it operates Intact Insurance Specialty Solutions. In 2025, BrokerLink had 200 branches and 4,000 employees.

=== Technology ===
Intact Financial Corporation opened an AI and data R&D lab in Hong Kong Science Park in late 2019. This was an extension of its Intact Lab, and it also had labs in Montreal, Toronto, and Quebec city. The company had 500 employees working to deploy around 93 machine learning models in 2024.

=== Climate programs ===
According to the Globe and Mail, after becoming CEO in 2008, Charles Brindamour began pushing for climate change adaptation in Canada to respond to climate change. In 2016, Intact Financial provided the initial funding for the Intact Centre on Climate Adaptation at the University of Waterloo. Intact states it has no influence on the center's research. Between 2010 and 2024, Intact Financial invested CA$25 million in around 100 separate climate adaptation projects. In response to increased extreme weather events, by 2024, the company operated maintenance teams and on-site restoration teams. It also partnered with Wildfire Defense Systems, a US private firefighting organization. After the 2024 Jasper wildfire in Alberta, Intact Financial brought in Wildfire Defense Systems to "fireproof buildings owned by 700 families and businesses" it insured in the town of Jasper and had 100 experts from On Side Restoration Services brought in to clear debris.

== See also ==
- List of insurance companies in Canada
- Companies listed on the Toronto Stock Exchange (I)
- Humanitarian response by for-profit organisations to the 2010 Haiti earthquake
- List of largest public companies in Canada by profit
- List of largest companies in Canada
