= List of largest public companies in Canada by profit =

This is a list of the 75 largest public companies in Canada by profit as of 2012. Royal Bank of Canada was the most profitable Canadian public company in the ranking.

Legend
▲	Increase in rank
▼	Decrease in rank
Steady	No change in rank

Rank	Rank Change	Company	Profit (1,000s CAD unless otherwise noted)	Headquarters
1	▲2	Royal Bank of Canada	8,831,000	Toronto & Montreal
2	Steady	Bank of Nova Scotia	6,508,000	Toronto
3	▼2	Toronto-Dominion Bank	6,125,000	Toronto
4	▲3	Bank of Montreal	4,115,000	Montreal & Toronto
5	▲1	Imperial Oil	3,766,000	Calgary
6	▲2	Canadian Imperial Bank of Commerce	3,339,000	Toronto
7	▼2	Suncor Energy	2,783,000	Calgary
8	▲5	BCE Inc.	2,763,000	Montreal
9	▲3	Canadian National Railway	2,680,000	Montreal
10	▼2	Potash Corporation of Saskatchewan	2,668,000	Saskatoon
11	▲987	The Woodbridge Company	2,070,000	Toronto
12	▲2	Husky Energy	2,022,000	Calgary
13	▲2	Great-West Lifeco	1,930,000	Winnipeg
14	▼3	Canadian Natural Resources	1,892,000	Calgary
15	▲35	First Quantum Minerals	1,772,900	Vancouver
16	▲1	Goldcorp Inc.	1,749,000	Vancouver
17	▲123	Manulife Financial	1,736,000	Toronto
18	▲3	Rogers Communications	1,700,000	Toronto
19	▲966	Sun Life Financial	1,674,000	Toronto
20	▼2	Power Financial	1,626,000	Montreal
21	▲7	National Bank of Canada	1,561,000	Montreal
22	▲2	Agrium Inc.	1,494,000	Calgary
23	▲10	Magna International	1,433,000	Aurora
24	▼8	Brookfield Asset Management	1,380,000	Toronto
25	▼3	TransCanada Pipelines	1,360,000	Calgary
26	▼6	TransCanada Corporation	1,354,000	Calgary
27	▲10	RioCan REIT	1,344,000	Toronto
28	▼1	TELUS Corporation	1,318,000	Vancouver
29	▼10	Brookfield Properties	1,287,000	Toronto
30	▼7	Cenovus Energy	993,000	Calgary
31	▼1	Canadian Oil Sands	981,000	Calgary
32	▲84	Calloway REIT	898,392	Vaughan
33	▼2	Power Corporation of Canada	832,000	Montreal
34	▼24	Teck Resources	866,000	Vancouver
35	Steady	IGM Financial	770,984	Winnipeg
36	▲6	HSBC Bank Canada	751,000	Vancouver
37	▲21	Shaw Communications	728,000	Calgary
38	▼4	Enbridge Inc.	715,000	Calgary
39	▼13	Boardwalk REIT	688,514	Calgary
40	▼1	Loblaw Companies	650,000	Brampton
41	▲3	Shoppers Drug Mart	608,481	Toronto
42	▼6	Bombardier Inc.	588,000	Montreal
43	▲14	Intact Financial	587,000	Toronto
44	▲3	Silver Wheaton	586,036	Vancouver
45	▲8	Canadian Utilities	580,000	Calgary
46	▲48	Jean Coutu Group	558,400	Varennes
47	▲185	Fairfax Financial Holdings	532,400	Toronto
48	▼1	Pacific Rubiales Energy	527,729	Toronto
49	▲7	Canadian Tire Corporation	499,200	Toronto
50	▲878	H&R REIT	498,804	Toronto
51	▼7	George Weston Limited	486,000	Toronto
52	▼6	Canadian Pacific Railway	484,000	Calgary
53	▲11	Metro Inc.	481,800	Montreal
54	▲878	E-L Financial Corporation	472,741	Toronto
55	▲22	Genworth MI Canada	470,422	Oakville
56	▲12	Alimentation Couche-Tard	457,600	Laval
57	▼8	Yamana Gold Inc.	442,064	Toronto
58	▲21	CAP REIT	412,263	Toronto
59	▲6	Tim Hortons	402,885	Oakville
60	▼8	First Capital Realty Inc.	392,959	Toronto
61	▲23	Morguard Corporation	389,443	Mississauga
62	▼3	Saputo Inc.	380,840	Montreal
63	▲12	Atco Limited	375,000	Calgary
64	▲61	Allied Properties REIT	369,816	Toronto
65	▲8	Fortis Inc.	362,000	St. John's
66	▼12	Westcoast Energy Inc.	357,000	Calgary
67	Steady	CI Financial	352,163	Toronto
68	▲46	Cominar REIT	342,171	Quebec City
70	▲68	IA Financial Group	342,000	Quebec City
71	▼2	Empire Company Limited	339,400	Stellarton
72	▼35	IAMGOLD Corporation	334,700	Toronto
73	▲8	CU Inc.	330,000	Calgary
74	▲1	Bell Aliant	328,700	Halifax
75	▲920	Agnico Eagle Mines Limited	310,916	Toronto

== See also ==
- List of largest companies in Canada
- List of companies of Canada
