= 123 Money =

Irish insurance company

123.ie
- Industry: Insurance industry
- Headquarters: Dublin, Ireland
- Parent: RSA Insurance Group
- Divisions: Mortgage protection insurance
- Website: www.123.ie

123 Money Ltd, trading as 123.ie, is an Irish insurance company with registered offices in Dublin. It sells personal insurance products online, including motor, home, health and life insurance. It became a subsidiary of RSA Insurance Ireland Ltd. in 2010 and it is regulated by the Central Bank of Ireland. In 2012, it reported sales worth €91 million and 270 employees.

== History ==
The company was incorporated in March 2000 by Dublin insurance broker Derek Richardson. It was the first online broker in Ireland, selling motor insurance, home and pet policies under-written by the Irish office of US Travelers Insurance. By March 2010, it had a consumer base of 170,000 policyholders and annual income of €60 million. It was acquired by the RSA Insurance Group in July 2010 for €65 million. 123.ie became a tied insurance agent for Irish Life in 2013, offering mortgage life insurance and lifelong insurance policies. In March 2013, it reported a €7m profit and an increase in turnover of 31%. In November 2013, it won Contact Centre Management Association awards for its customer retention programme and credit management team.

== Acquisition by RSA ==
123.ie was acquired by the RSA Insurance Group in July 2010 for €65 million. It had reported gross assets of €20m at the time. RSA became the underwriter of policies sold by 123.ie after the acquisition, and took on its online infrastructure and physical offices. 123.ie continues to trade under its own name branding after the acquisition.
