= Toronto Industry Network =

Group of manufacturers in Canada

The Toronto Industry Network (TIN) is a group of manufacturers and manufacturing associations with operations in Toronto, Ontario, Canada.

According to the organization, Network organizations employ 25,000 people directly and another 100,000 indirectly through suppliers and customers in the Toronto area. Operating since 2001, TIN provides the manufacturing community access to the City of Toronto, participating in the formulation of city policies that affect the industry. TIN is focused on making Toronto more competitive in manufacturing with Canada and foreign countries.

== List of members ==
=== Company members ===
- Atlantic Packaging Products Ltd.
- Atlantic Packaging Products Ltd.
- Campbell Company of Canada
- Canadian Fuels
- CBM Readymix
- DEL
- Gay Lee Foods
- Irving Tissue
- K+S Windsor Salt Ltd.
- Lafarge
- Lincoln Electric Company of Canada
- Mondelez Canada
- Owens Corning Insulating Systems Canada LP
- Redpath Sugar
- Sanofi Pasteur
- Siltech Corporation
- The International Group, Inc.

Source: Toronto Industry Network.

=== Association members ===
- Canadian Fuels Association
- Leaside Business Park
- South Etobicoke Industrial Employers Association

Source: Toronto Industry Network.
