= James Mason (Canadian politician) =

Canadian politician

The Honourable James Mason
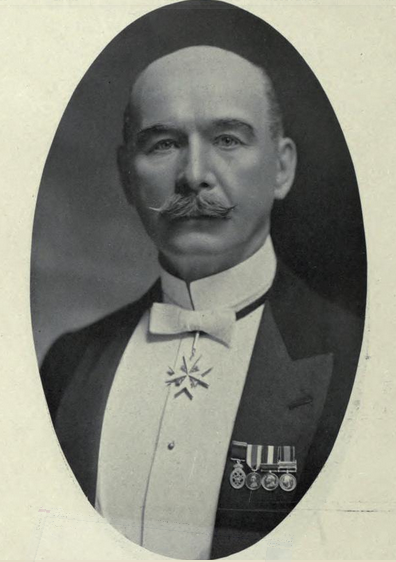

Canadian Senator from Ontario
- In office 1913–1918
- Appointed by: Robert Borden

Personal details
- Born: August 25, 1843 Toronto, Ontario, Canada
- Died: July 16, 1918 (aged 74) Toronto, Ontario, Canada
- Party: Conservative
- Children: 2

Military service
- Allegiance: Canada
- Branch/service: Canadian Militia
- Years of service: 1866 - 1915
- Rank: Brigadier General
- Unit: Queen's Own Rifles of Canada; 10th Toronto Grenadiers
- Battles/wars: Fenian Raids; Battle of Ridgeway; North-West Rebellion; Battle of Batoche (WIA); First World War

James Mason (August 25, 1843 − July 16, 1918) was a Canadian banker, Senator and military officer.

== Background ==
Mason was born in Toronto and educated at private schools and the Toronto Model School where he was head boy. After graduation, he joined the Toronto Savings Bank (later the Home Bank of Canada) ultimately becoming its general manager and president in 1873.

He was appointed to the Senate of Canada in 1913 by Prime Minister Robert Borden and sat as a Conservative. Mason retired from the bank and was appointed its honorary president with his son, Harry G. Mason, succeeding him as general manager.

The Home Bank collapsed in the early 1920s in part due to questionable practices it had engaged in beginning under Mason's tenure.

Mason was one of the founders and funders of the Toronto Mechanics' Institute which ultimately evolved into the Toronto Public Library.

Mason died at home following an operation for appendicitis.

== Military career ==
Mason joined the Queen's Own Rifles during the Fenian Raids of the 1860s. In 1882, he was gazetted captain of the 10th Royal Grenadiers and commanded No. 2 Service Company during the North-West Rebellion and was severely wounded at the Battle of Batoche. In 1893, he was promoted to lieutenant colonel and put in command of his regiment. In 1897, he was one of the officer's sent to London to represent Canada for the Diamond Jubilee of the Queen and was personally presented to Queen Victoria.

Around the turn of the century, he was put in command of the 4th Infantry Brigade and retired with the rank of colonel in 1910. He was promoted to the rank of brigadier-general in 1915 for his work as Chief Organizer of the Reserve Militia of Canada and for his work in recruitment efforts during the war.

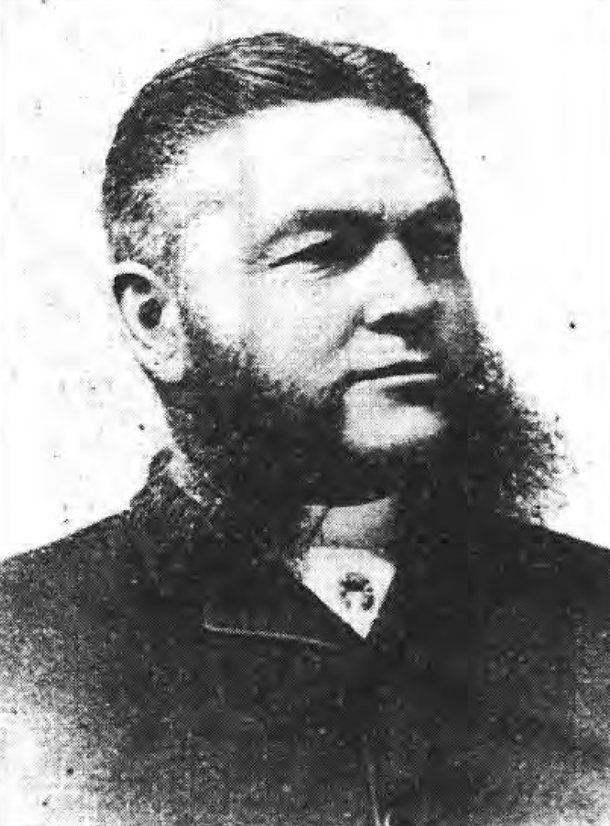
James Mason's close friend Canadian railway magnate Hugh Ryan.

Mason was a founder of the Royal Canadian Military Institute and served as its president. He was also an ardent imperialist and a founder of the Empire Club of Canada. The South African War Memorial on Toronto's University Avenue was built largely through his efforts.

== Personal life ==
Mason was a close personal friend of Toronto railway magnate Hugh Ryan and served as one of his pallbearers —alongside lieutenant governor of Ontario, Sir Oliver Mowat; businessman Eugene O'Keefe; Ontario politician, William Harty; Ontario Banker, W.S. Lee —at Ryan's funeral held in St Michael's Cathedral Basilica in 1899.
