= Adam Beck Memorial =

Memorial in Toronto, Ontario, Canada

- Canada
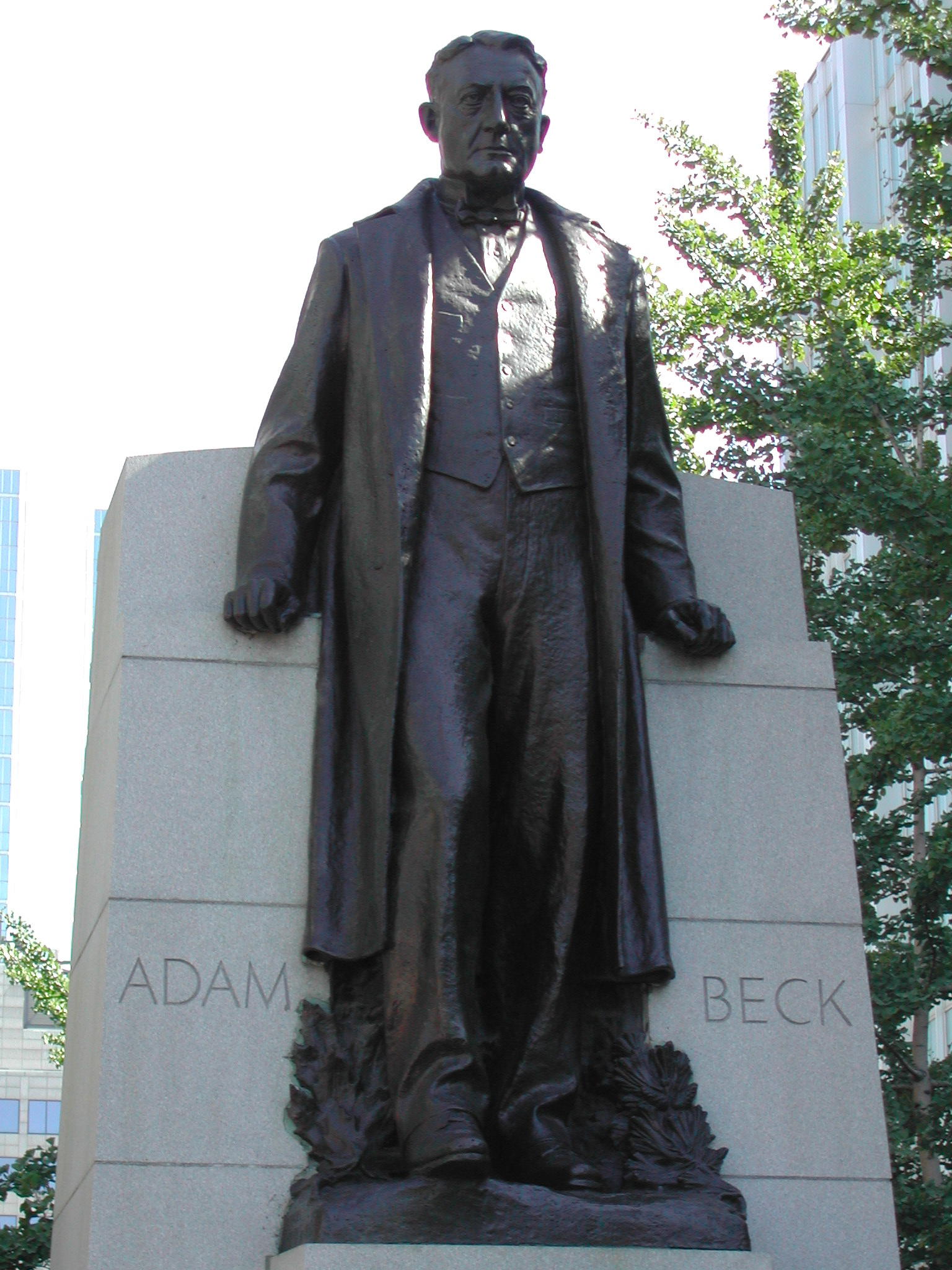
- Adam Beck Memorial
- For Adam Beck
- Unveiled: 1934
- Location: 43.650464°N 79.386444°W; University Avenue just south of Queen Street West. near Toronto, Ontario, Canada
- Designed by: Emanuel Hahn

The Adam Beck Memorial is a memorial in Toronto, Ontario, Canada, in honour of the founder of Ontario Hydro, Sir Adam Beck. It is located in the landscaped median of University Avenue just south of Queen Street West. Designed by sculptor Emanuel Hahn, the monument was the first place entry in a design competition for a memorial to commemorate Adam Beck. It was unveiled in 1934.

== History ==
Adam Beck, respected for his efforts in developing the province of Ontario's hydroelectricity generation and transmission infrastructure and in bringing hydroelectricity into public hands, died in 1925. Four years later, a committee was appointed by Toronto City Council to determine how best to commemorate his life, venerated as Ontario's greatest public servant at the time. It recommended a bronze statue on University Avenue, and a design competition was initiated with a call for designs on 29 April 1929.

Emanuel Hahn won the competition, while Alfred Howell and G.A. Bachman placed second and third, respectively. The statue was originally to be located in front of the 1915 Hydro-Electric Power Commission of Ontario Building (now part of Princess Margaret Hospital), but this plan proved to be impractical because it would interfere with access to Toronto General Hospital across University Avenue. Hahn rejected the suggestion of Queen's Park as a possible site and after working with him to find an agreeable location, Toronto City Council approved the site in the University Avenue median just south of Queen Street in February 1932. In spite of not being located in front of the Hydro-Electric Power Commission of Ontario office building on University Avenue, the sculpture was oriented northward towards it as a symbolic link, and also to the Ontario Legislative Building, where Adam Beck had served as a Member of Provincial Parliament.

The memorial was unveiled on 1 September 1934 by Toronto Mayor William James Stewart. In 1947, the Adam Beck Memorial, along with all of University Avenue's monuments, was temporarily removed for the reconfiguration of the boulevard. The median was shifted west, and the monuments were then reinstalled.

== Design ==
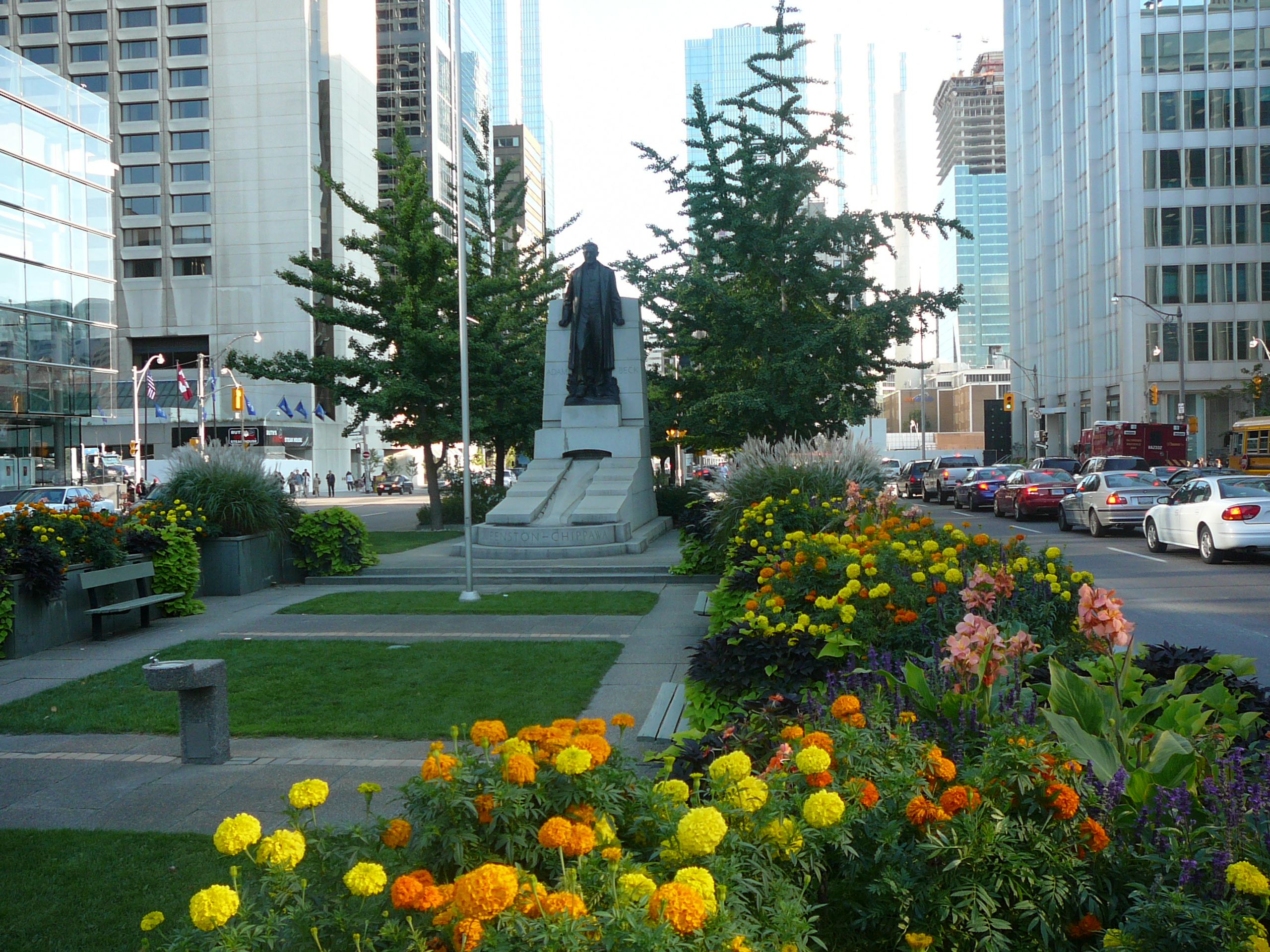
The portrait sculpture of Adam Beck faces north towards the 1915 Hydro-Electric Power Commission of Ontario office building and the Ontario Legislative Building.

The statue depicts Adam Beck as a commanding figure with his hands clenched, right foot slightly forward, and topcoat open. At approximately 3.7 metres in height, the portrait sculpture is one of the two largest such works of art in Toronto along with the equestrian sculpture of Edward VII in Queen's Park. Adam Beck stands amidst pine cones and maple leaves carved in stone, evoking Canadian symbolism. The base is composed of large white granite blocks in an L-shape, with a 4.5 metre-high wall at its back end rising to hold the portrait statue up to its arms. The base is 11.8 metres long and 2.8 metres wide. From Beck's feet, it gently slopes to ground level with a central channel that allows rainwater to cascade down into a basin, symbolizing the many Ontario waterways dammed to generate electricity.

Its inscription (in all block letters except for the t in "Kt.") reads:

Erected by the Corporation of the City of Toronto & the Toronto Hydro Electric Commission in grateful commemoration of the public services of Sir Adam Beck, Kt. L.L.D. M.L.A., whose labours have ensured that the citizens of his native province under co-operative municipal ownership shall enjoy the benefits of low-cost electrical energy derived from water-power resources to serve the industrial and domestic needs of the Province of Ontario MCMXXXIV Queenston-Chippawa Niagara : Nipigon : Trent : Eugenia : Severn : Muskoka : Rideau : Nipissing

The names of locations in Ontario at the end of the inscription are emphasized in large letters, referencing the locations of contemporary Hydro-Electric Power Commission of Ontario generating stations. Queenston-Chippawa refers to Sir Adam Beck I Generating Station, the commission's largest and most prominent hydroelectric generating station at the time, and is emphasized by its placement on the prominent rounded front tip of the monument's granite base.

== See also ==
- Ontario Veterans Memorial
- South African War Memorial (Toronto)
