= Cleeve Horne =

Canadian artist (1912–1998)

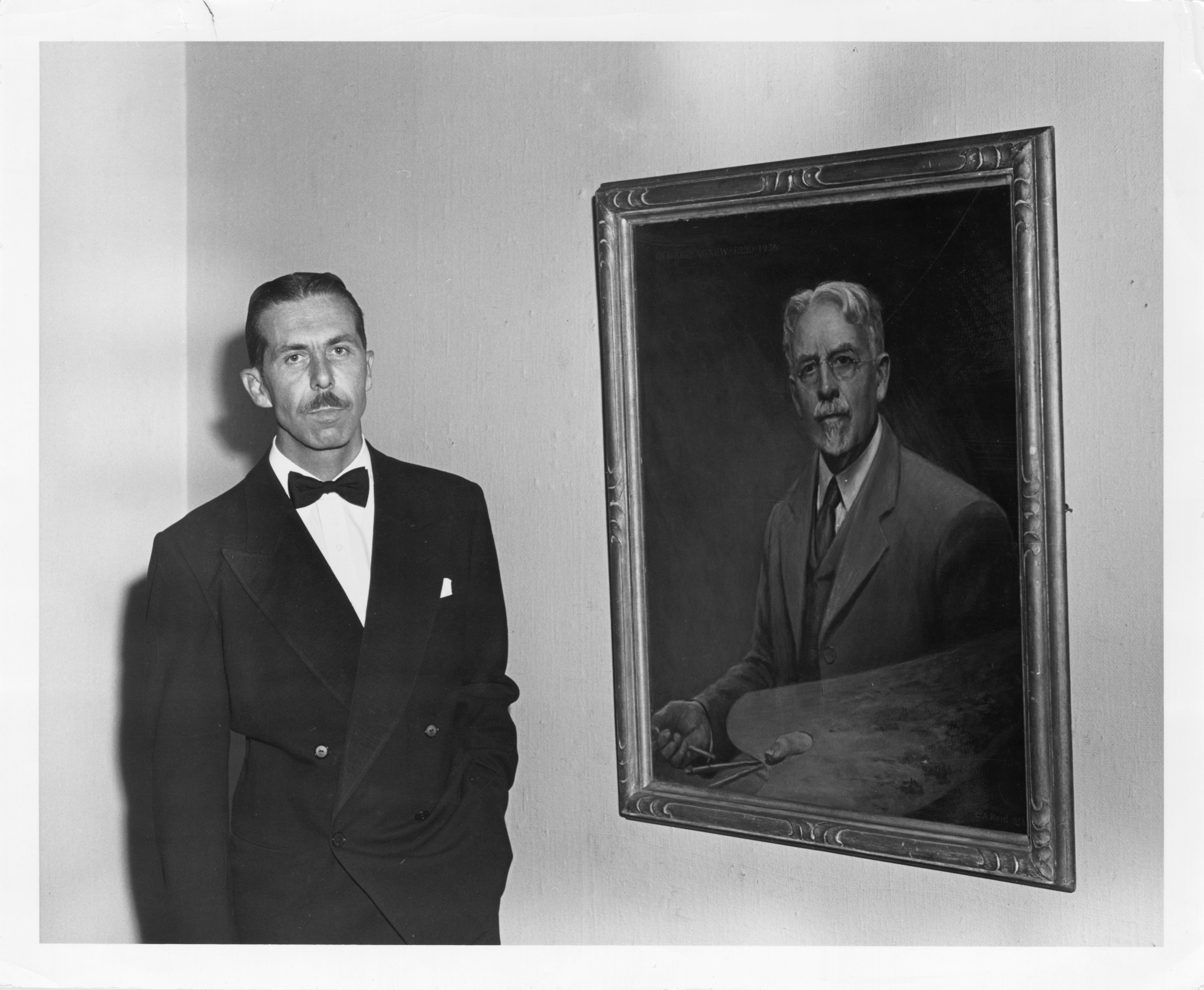
- Cleeve Horne with portrait of George A. Reid
- Born: Arthur Edward Cleeve Horne; January 9, 1912; Jamaica, British West Indies
- Died: 5 July 1998 (aged 86); Toronto, Ontario, Canada
- Education: Dorothy Dick (1927-1928); Ontario College of Art
- Known for: Painting, sculpture
- Spouse: Jean Mildred Harris (m. 1939)
- Awards: Order of Ontario (1987); Order of Canada(1997); Honorary academician of The Canadian Portrait Academy (2000)

Arthur Edward Cleeve Horne, OC OOnt RCA, (January 9, 1912 – July 5, 1998) was a Canadian portrait painter and sculptor.

== Career ==
Born in Jamaica, British West Indies, Horne came to Canada with his parents in 1913. When he was around nine years of age, recovering from pneumonia, his mother gave him modelling clay to pass the time. He did a head of Shakespeare which won a prize at the Canadian National Exhibition. By age 15, he was exhibiting with the Royal Canadian Academy.

In Horne's early career, he wanted to become a portrait sculptor and studied under Dorothy Dick, a British sculptor (1927–1928). From 1931 to 1934, he attended the Ontario College of Art and Design, Toronto, first studying sculpture under Emanuel Hahn but soon changing to painting with J. W. Beatty. He also studied portrait and landscape painting under John Wentworth Russell (1934–1935). He was told by Emanuel Hahn, "A sculptor can never change his hand and become a painter." Horne, however, achieved much more acclaim as a painter than a sculptor.

Horne was primarily a society painter. He is thought to have painted over 400 portraits during his career ca.(1928–1991). His most notable subjects include Alexander Graham Bell, Claude Bissell, Bora Laskin, Pauline Mills McGibbon, Jeanne Sauvé, Colonel R. Samuel McLaughlin, and John Diefenbaker, among many others. He held his first exhibition in 1935, his second in 1937, and served as a camouflage officer in the army in the Second World War and retired with the rank of Captain. Cleeve Horne died at Toronto, Ontario, Canada of a respiratory-related illness in 1998.

== Commissions ==
- Alexander Graham Bell, Brantford, Ont., 1948;
- Wm Shakespeare, Stratford, Ont., 1950;
- War Memorial, Law Society Upper Canada, Osgoode Hall, Toronto, 1951;
- bas-relief on Bank of Canada Building (Toronto), 1958.

== Awards and honours ==
- 1934 Awarded the Lieutenant Governor's Medal for Painting at the Ontario College of Art (first recipient)
- 1963 Awarded the Royal Architectural Institute of Canada's Allied Arts Medal
- 1965 Awarded the Royal Canadian Academy of Arts Medal
- 1967 Awarded the Canadian Centennial Medal
- 1977 Awarded the Queen Elizabeth II Silver Jubilee Medal
- 1982 Awarded the Ontario Society of Artists Award
- 1992 Awarded the 125th Anniversary of the Confederation of Canada Medal
- 1984 Appointment as "fellow", Ontario College of Art & Design
- 1987 Appointment to the Order of Ontario
- 1996 Appointment as officer of the Order of Canada
- 1999 Named "One of the Top 100 Portrait Artists of the 20th Century" by the Canadian Portrait Academy

== Professional affiliations ==
Horne was a member of the Ontario Society of Artists and held the position of President from 1949-1951. He was also a member of the Royal Canadian Academy of Arts, Sculptors Society of Canada, the Canadian Portrait Academy and an Associate of the Ontario College of Art (AOCA).

== Works ==
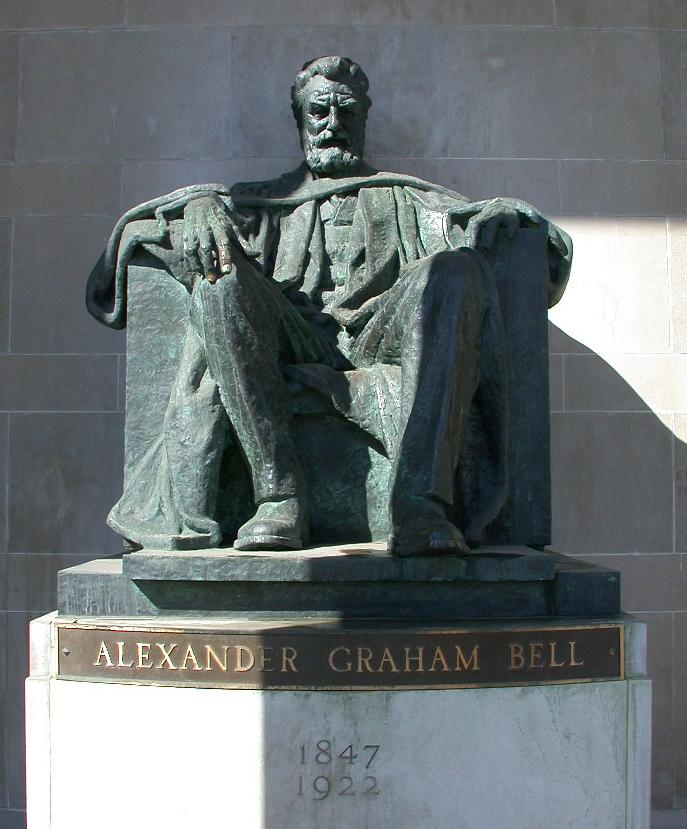
Cleeve Horne's sculpture of Alexander Graham Bell in front of the Brantford Bell Telephone Building

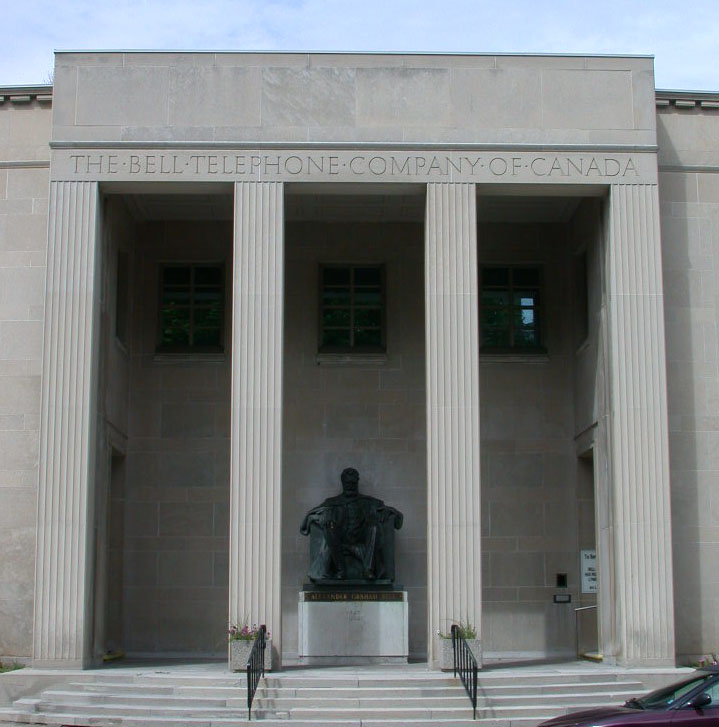
Cleeve Horne's sculpture of Alexander Graham Bell in front of the Brantford Bell Telephone Building

== Personal life ==
Horne lived the majority of his life in Toronto. At the Ontario College of Art he met Jean Harris, a sculpture student; they married in 1939 and had three sons. The Hornes owned two houses that were both designed by prominent architectural firms. One was a permanent residence at 181 Balmoral Avenue in Toronto, built in 1952 and designed by Gordon Adamson. The other was a summer home at 1950 Concession 8 in Pickering, Ontario. The summer home was built in 1957 and designed by architects Michael Clifford and Kenneth Lawrie, and features a hyperbolic paraboloid roof.
