= Bank of Canada Building (Toronto) =

Bank office building in Toronto, Ontario, Canada

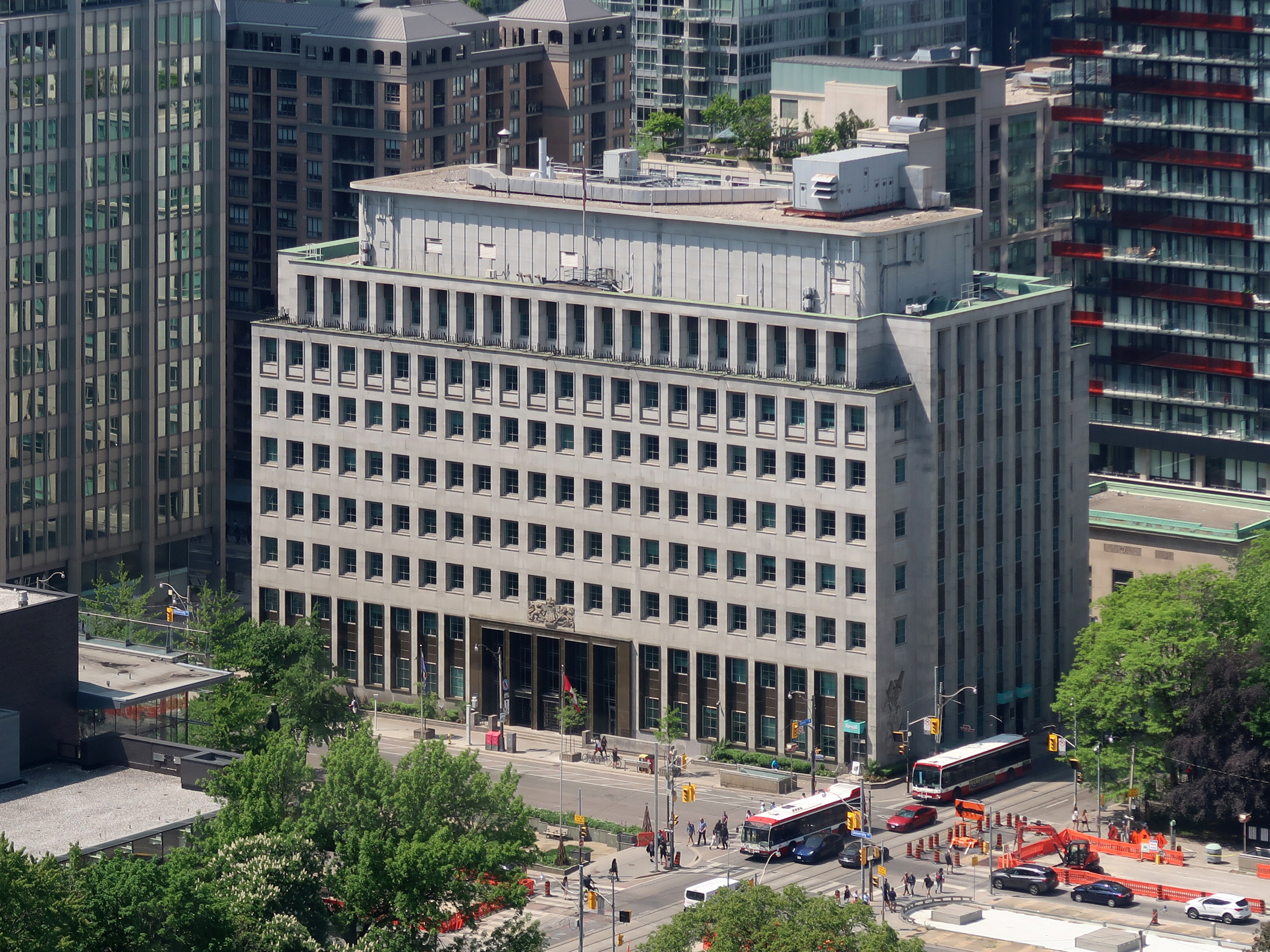
- Bank of Canada Building in 2023

General information
- Architectural style: Modern Classical architecture
- Location: Toronto, Ontario, 250 University Avenue, Canada
- Coordinates: 43°39′01″N 79°23′12.5″W
- Elevation: 90 metres (295 ft)
- Construction started: 1954
- Completed: 1958

Design and construction
- Architects: Marani & Morris
- Other designers: Cleeve Horne and Louis Temporale

The Bank of Canada Building in Toronto, Ontario, Canada, was one of the regional offices for the central bank. It was built in 1957–1958 with vaults for gold and cash for banks in the Greater Toronto Area. The central bank's regional offices are now at Sun Life Financial Tower at 150 King Street West.

The building was designed by Canadian architect Ferdinand Herbert Marani and British-born Canadian architect Robert Schofield Morris (1898–1964), with a modern take of classical architecture. The building had mostly a simple clean façade but featured two carvings: bas-relief designs on north and south façade by sculptor Cleeve Horne (1912-1998) and as well as the Arms of Canada on the front entrance by Louis Temporale (1909-1994).
