= Sun Life Centre =

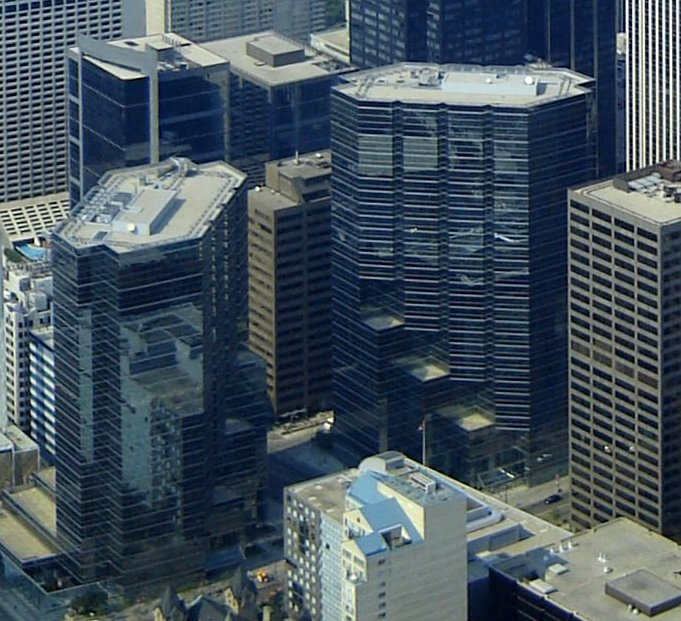
- The Sun Life Centre
- Interactive map of the Sun Life Centre area

General information
- Status: Completed
- Type: Office
- Location: 150 King Street West Toronto, Ontario Canada (East Tower); 200 King Street West Toronto, Ontario (West Tower)
- Coordinates: 43.647881°N 79.385544°W
- Completed: 1984
- Owner: Bentall Kennedy

Height
- Roof: 125 m (East Tower); 110 m (West Tower)

Technical details
- Floor count: 28 (East Tower); 24 (West Tower)

Design and construction
- Architect: WZMH Architects

The Sun Life Centre in Toronto, Ontario (also known as 150 King Street West) was built in 1984 to house the Toronto operations of Sun Life Financial, serving as the insurance company's global headquarters until 2017. The Sun Life Financial Tower is known as an architectural symbol of modernism, located in the heart of Toronto's financial district at 150 King Street West.

Construction of the stainless steel and glass high-rise structure was completed in 1984 and was originally developed to house the head office of Sun Life 9, now Sun Life Financial.

Toronto's Sun Life Centre/150 King W. complex should not be mistaken for the Sun Life Building in Montreal, the original global headquarters before Sun Life moved its HQ from Quebec to Ontario in 1976, after the election of the first PQ government.

Sun Life moved its global headquarters from 150 King to the newly named Sun Life Financial Tower at One York in Toronto's South Core district in 2017. Bank of Canada regional office is located here since vacating the Bank of Canada Building at 250 University Avenue.

Sun Life retains ownership over 150 King Street West and has leased the roughly 150,000 square feet of space it vacated.

== Towers ==
Located at the corner of King Street West and University Avenue, the taller East Tower is in the Financial District while the slightly shorter West Tower is located in the area known as the Entertainment District.

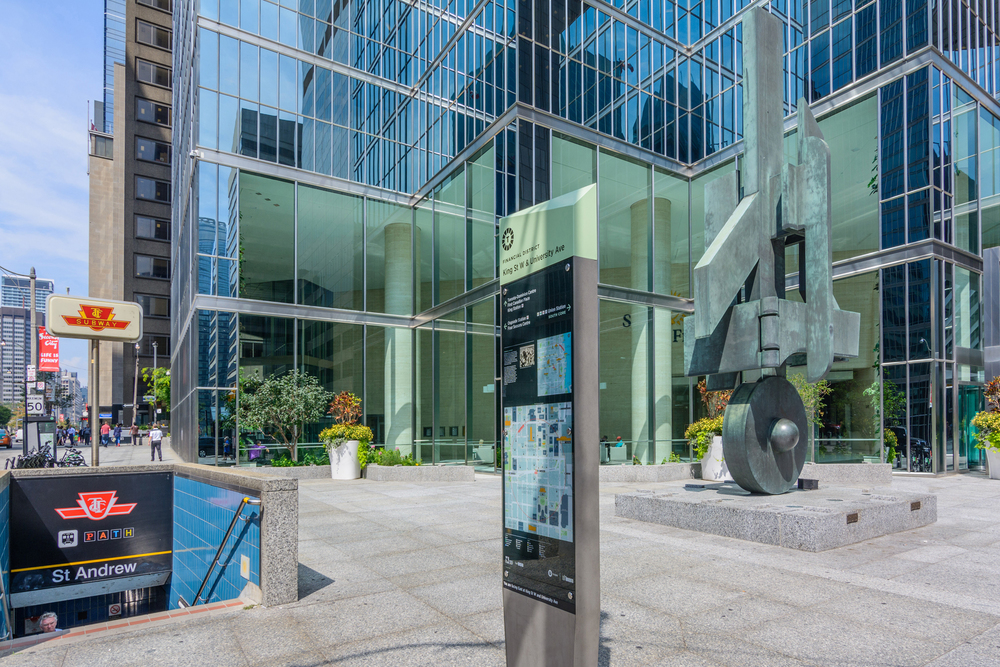
150 King Street West, known as the Sun Life Centre, is pictured with St. Andrew TTC Subway station in foreground

Vantage Venues is located on the 16th and 27th floors and offers excellent views of the city. The Sun Life Centre is connected to Toronto's PATH system and the two towers share an underground connection to St. Andrew Subway Station.

In 2010, the Sun Life Centre was awarded LEED Gold certification under the Canada Green Building Council's LEED for Existing Buildings: Operations & Maintenance green building rating system.

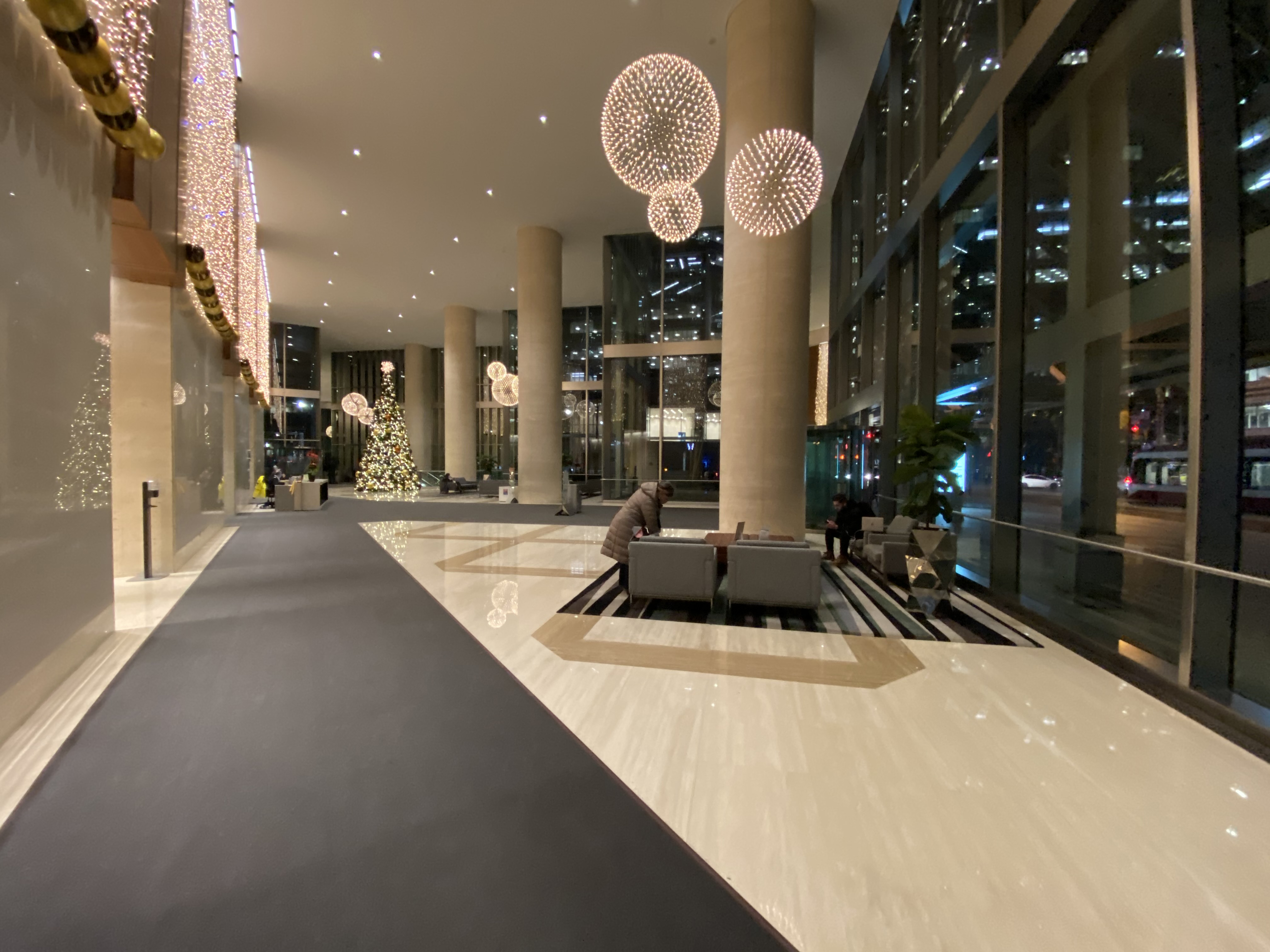
200 King Street West office lobby

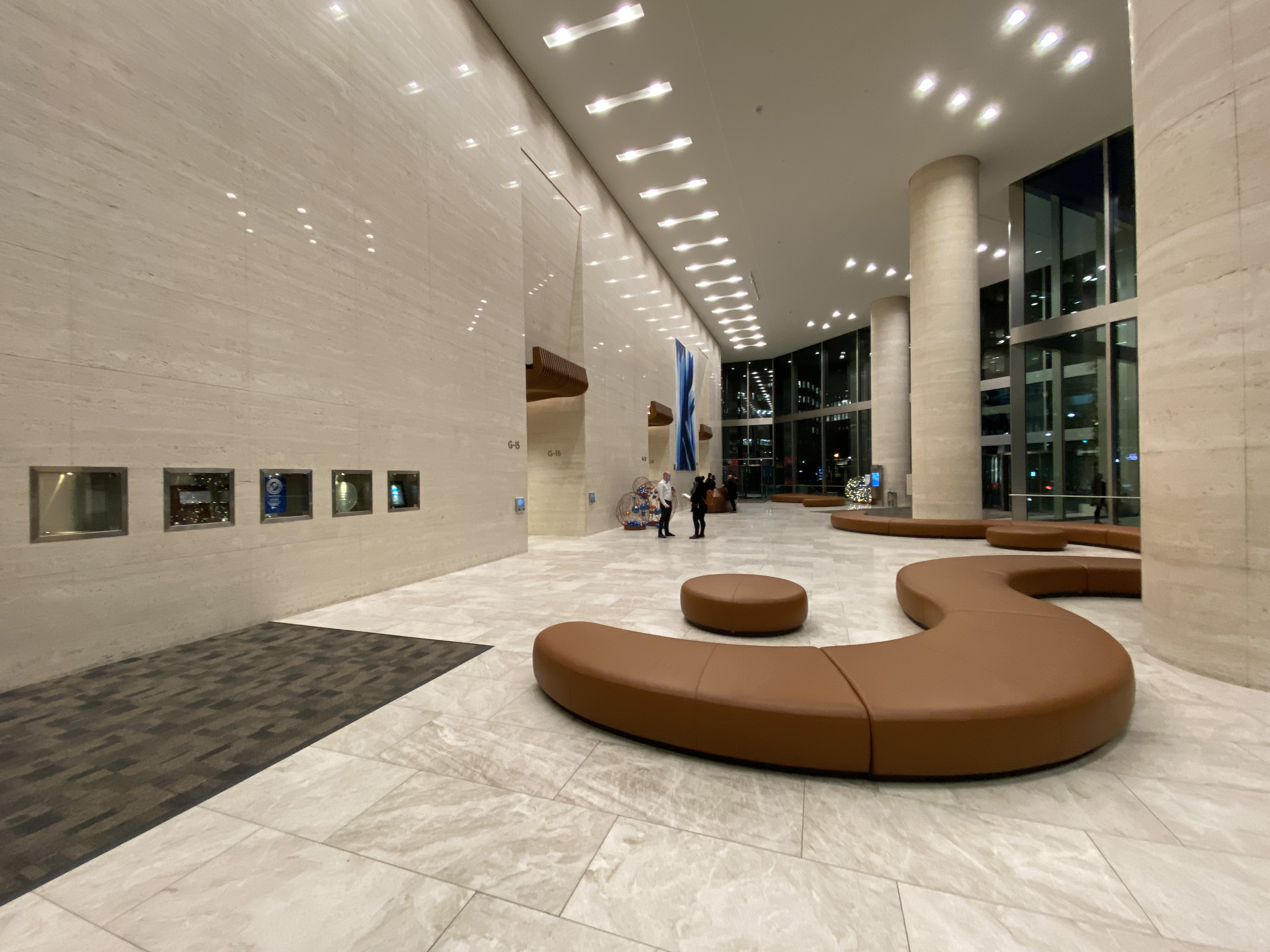
150 King Street West office lobby

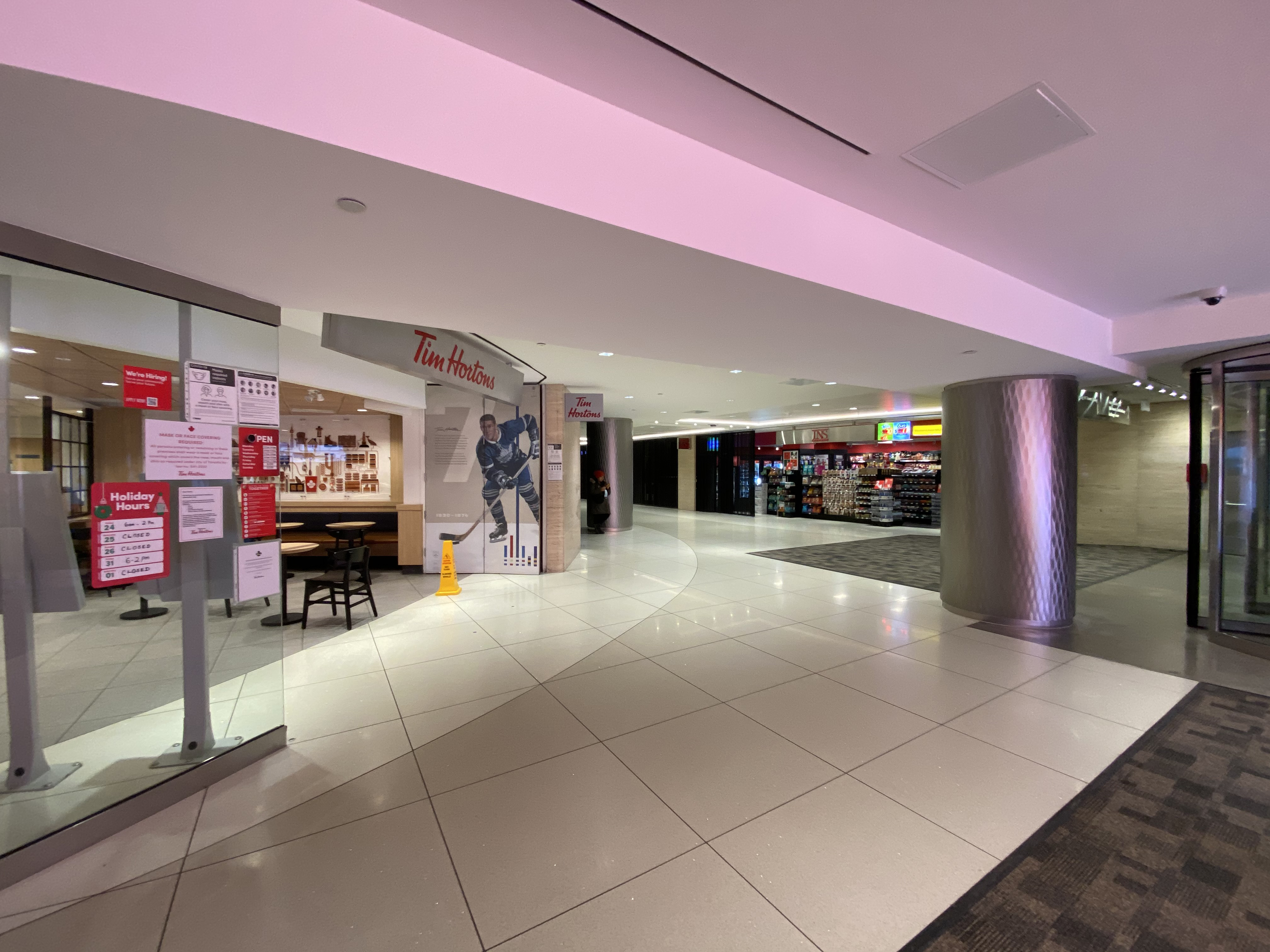
Basement PATH

== Management ==
150 King Street West is managed by Sun Life's asset management subsidiary BentallGreenOak.
