= South African War Memorial (Toronto) =

Memorial in Toronto, Ontario, Canada

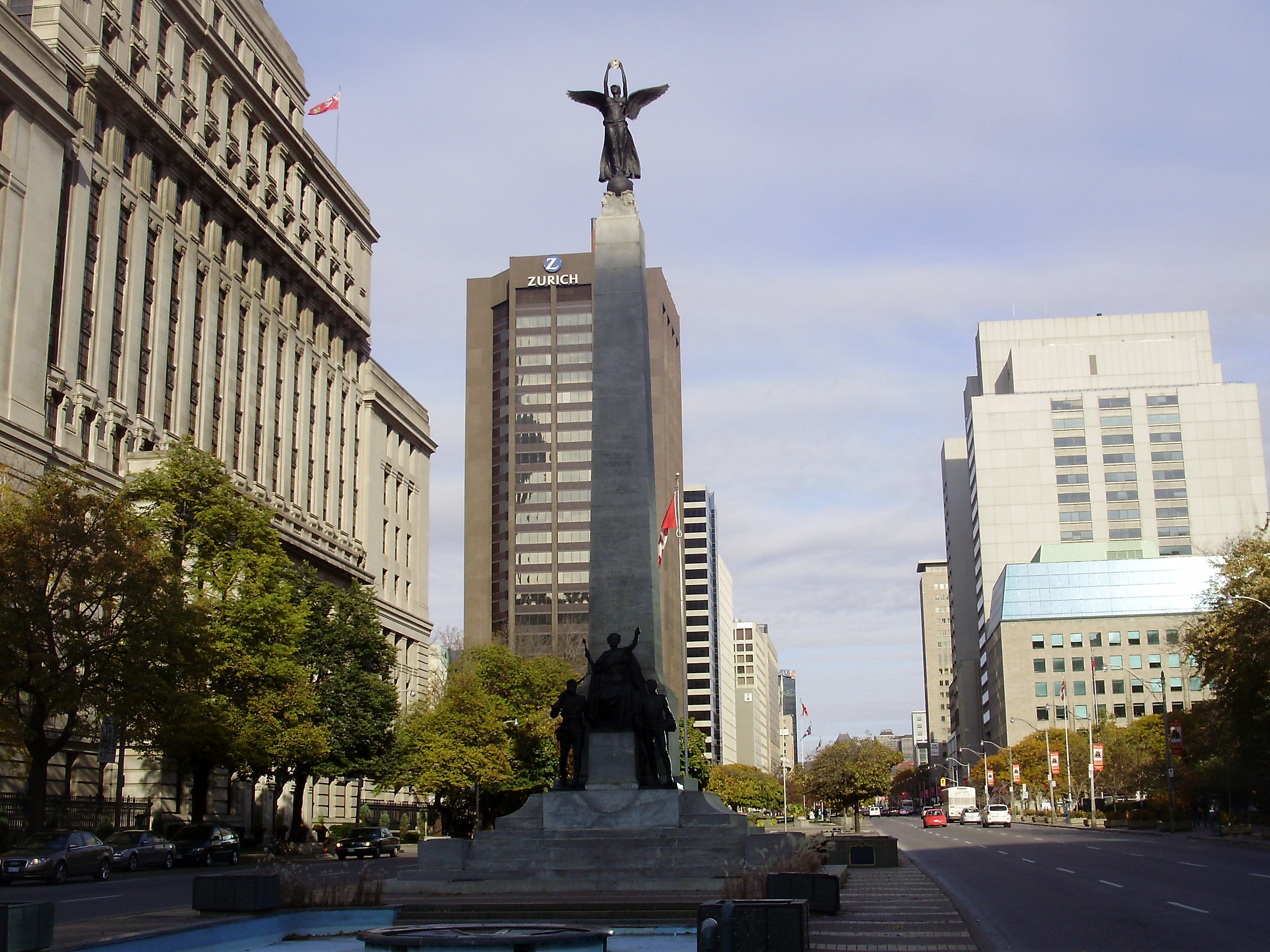
- The South African War Memorial by Walter Seymour Allward rises above University Avenue
- Interactive map of South African War Memorial
- Location: Toronto, Ontario, Canada
- Coordinates: 43°39′04.72″N 079°23′12.49″W
- Designer: Walter Seymour Allward
- Type: War memorial
- Opening date: 1910
- Dedicated to: Those who fought in the Boer War

The South African War Memorial is a memorial located at University Avenue and Queen Street West in Toronto, Ontario, Canada.

Commissioned in 1910, largely as the result of the efforts of James Mason, and designed by Walter Seymour Allward to commemorate Canada's participation in the Second Boer War, it consists of three bronze figures at the base of a granite column. Another bronze figure is found at the top of the memorial. It was restored in 2001.

The Ontario Heritage Foundation plaque for this memorial erroneously states that Walter Allward studied under Emanuel Hahn; in fact, it was the other way around.

For two decades after the war, Canadians would gather on February 27 (known in Canada as "Paardeberg Day") around memorials to the South African War to say prayers and honour veterans. This continued until the end of the First World War, when Armistice Day (later called Remembrance Day) began to be observed on November 11. The monument was unveiled in 1910 by Sir John French.

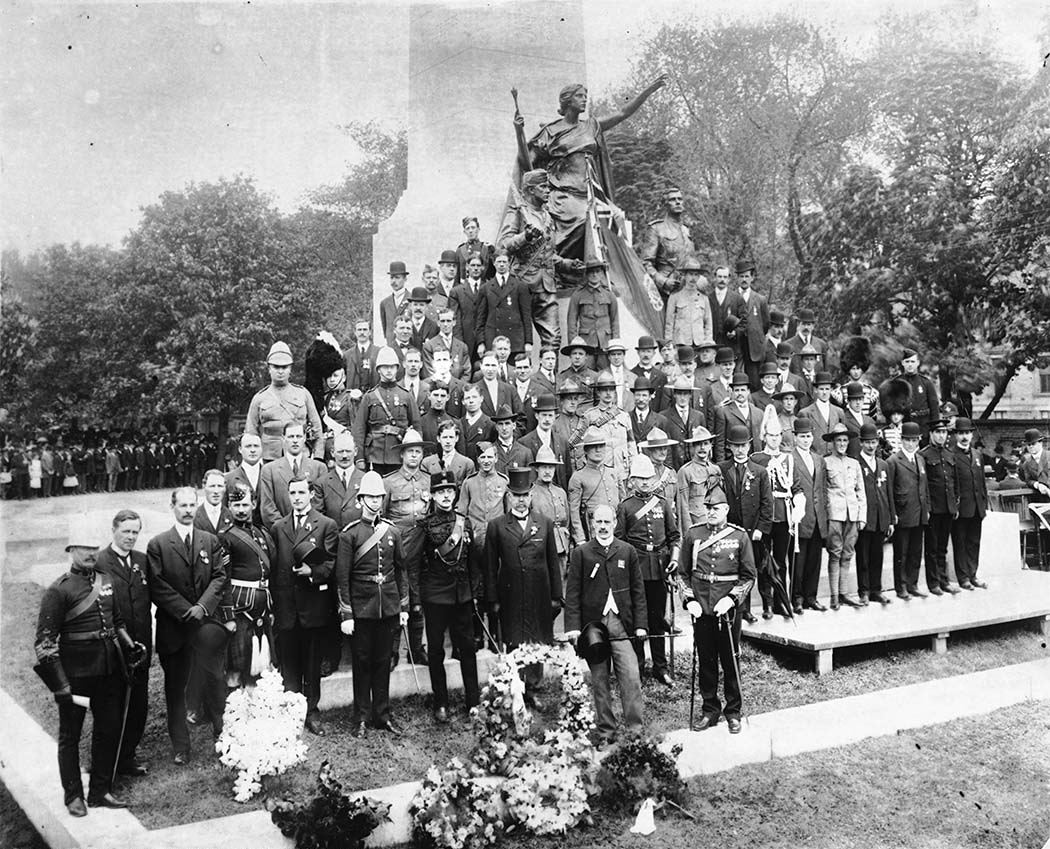
Unveiling of the memorial May 24, 1910

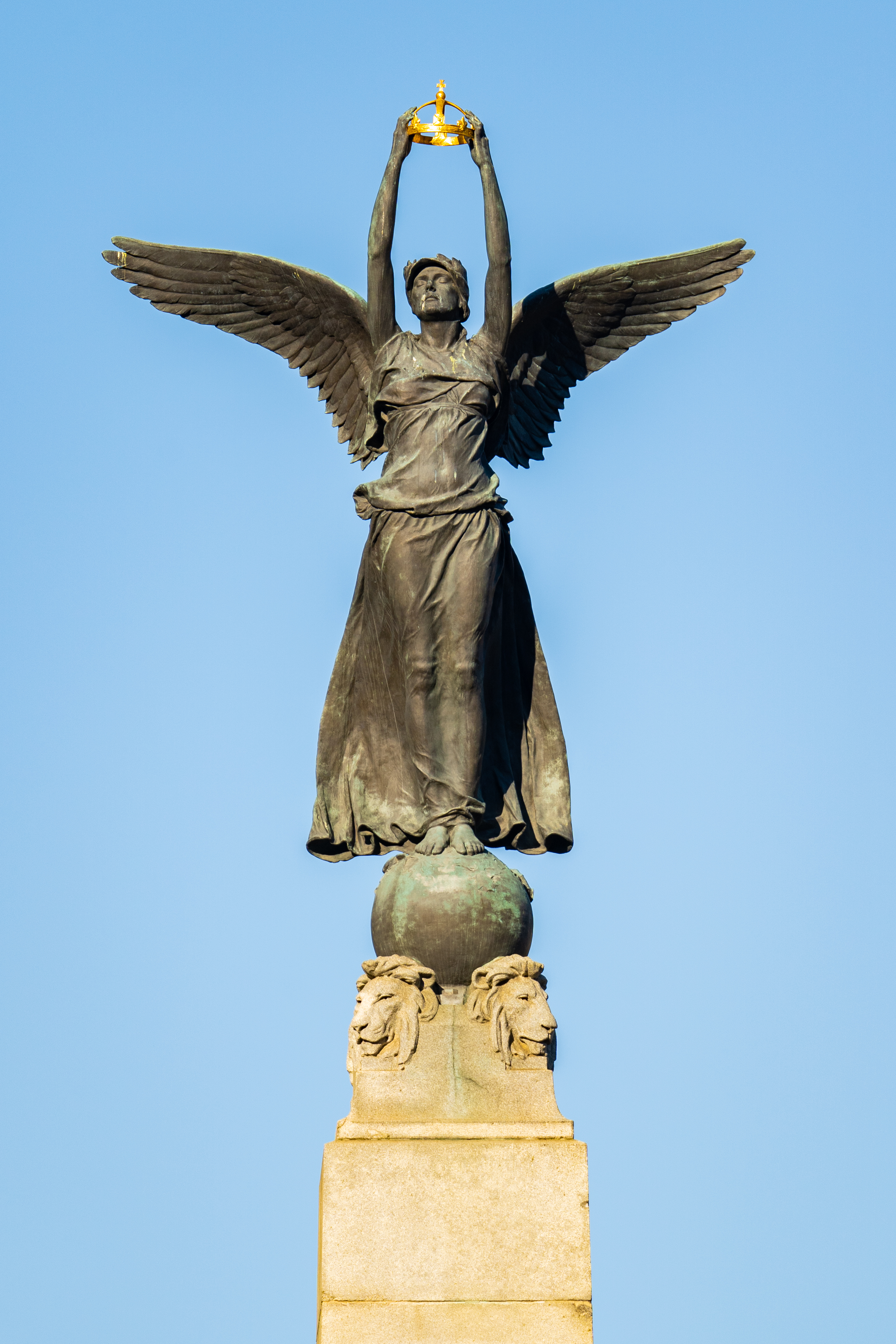
Winged figure holding a golden crown at the top of the obelisk

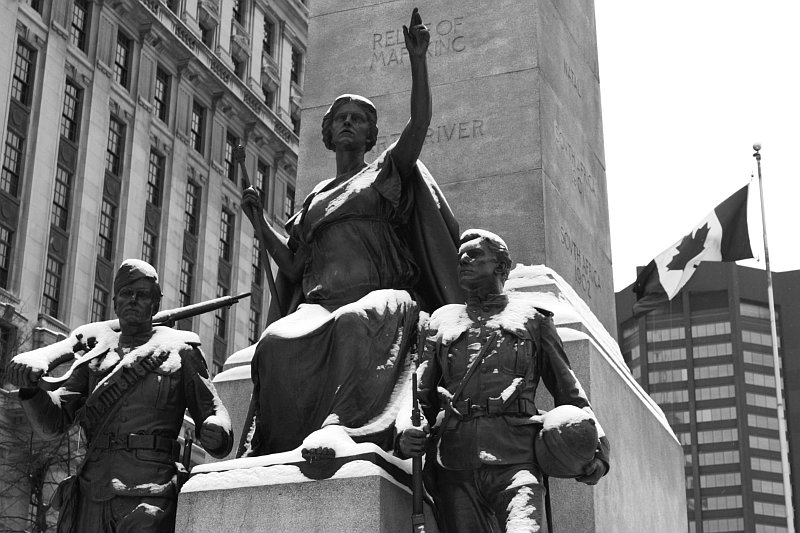
The base of Walter Seymour Allward's South African War Memorial in the winter

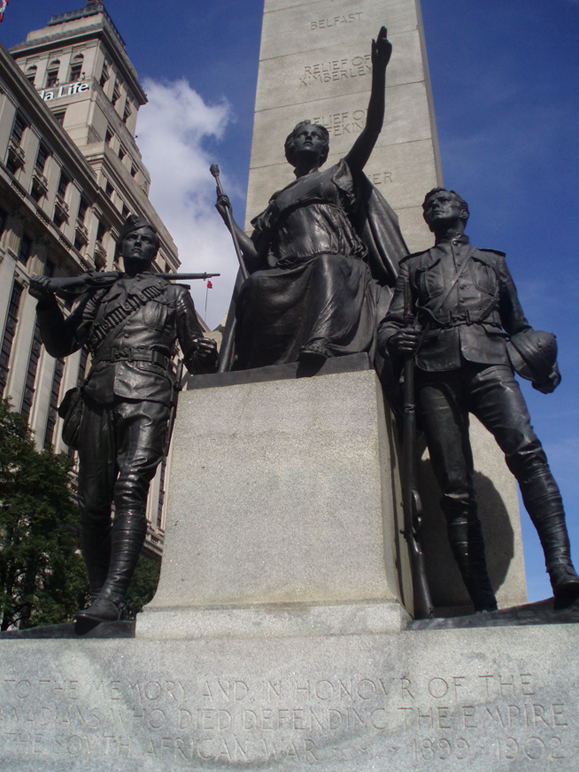
Close-up of the statue

== See also ==
- Canadian war memorials
