= Royal Canadian Military Institute =

Private members' club in Toronto, Ontario

Coordinates: 43.654066°N 79.388489°W

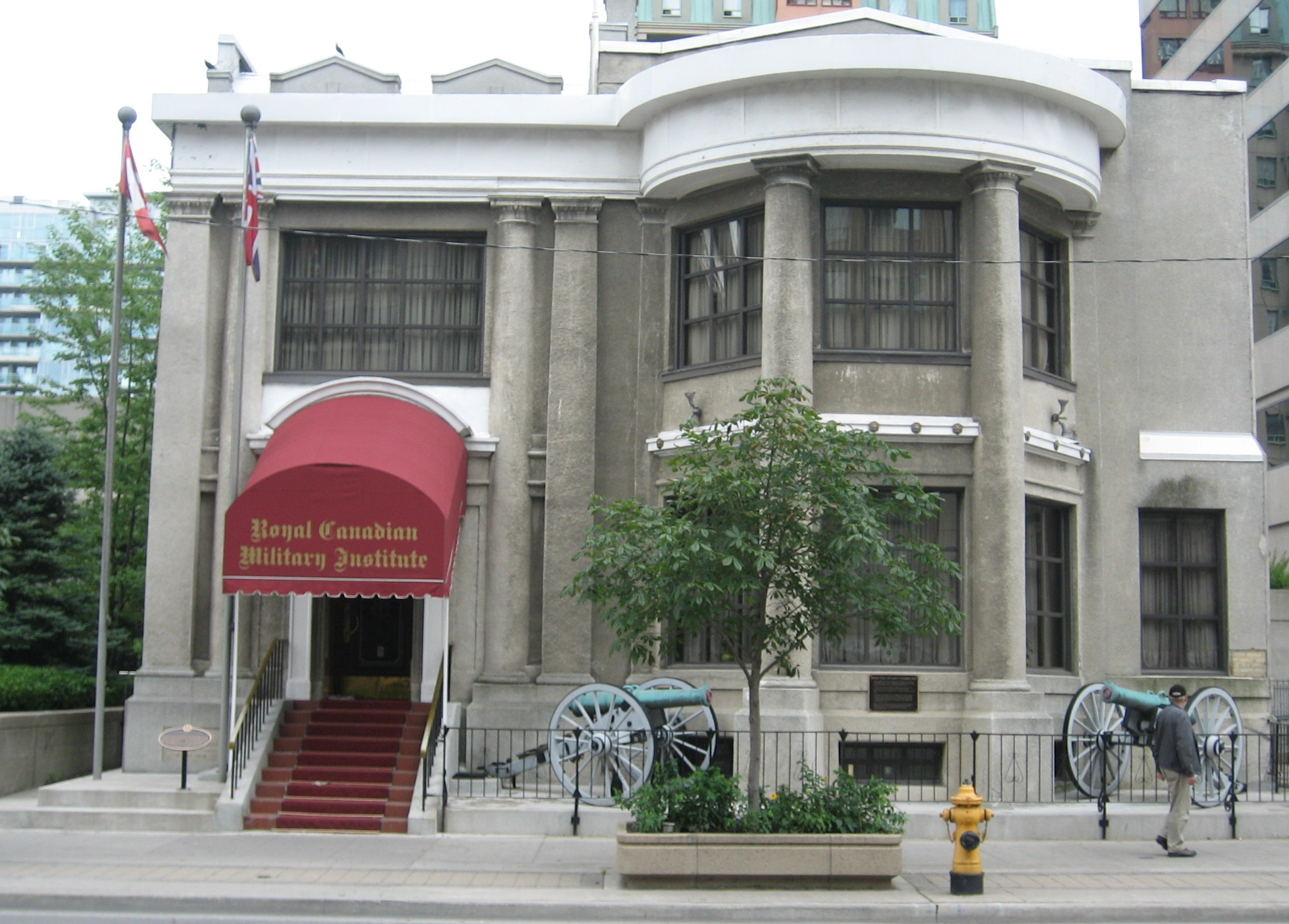
- The RCMI clubhouse in 2008, before the site was redeveloped
- Abbreviation: RCMI
- Founded: 1890; 136 years ago (as the Canadian Military Institute)
- Type: Private members' club
- Purpose: Research, discussion and education in defence studies
- Location(s): 426 University Avenue; Toronto, Ontario, Canada
- Region served: Canada
- Official language: English, French
- Website: www.rcmi.org

The Royal Canadian Military Institute (RCMI) is a private members' organization with a focus on military history, defence studies and international affairs. Located in Toronto, Ontario, Canada, it was founded as the Canadian Military Institute on January 14, 1890. General Sir William Dillon Otter set the founding principles: "to provide in an Institute for the defence forces of Canada a Library, museum and club for the purposes of the promotion of military art, science and literature, to gather and preserve the records of the defence forces, and develop its specialized field in Canadian history." The motto of the RCMI is Fidelis Permanere (Latin for 'To remain faithful').

The RCMI's original headquarters at 426 University Avenue was built in 1907. Designed by William Craven Vaux Chadwick, the library was built in 1908. The building was expanded in 1912 and 1935, and renovated during the 1960s. In 2007, the facade of 426 University Avenue was reconstructed by E R A Kubaneck Architects, according to archeological records. Governor General David Johnston laid the cornerstone on June 9, 2012, for a 42-story, 315 suite condominium residence, lofts, and mixed-use project.

The colonel in chief of the RCMI is Princess Alexandra, The Honourable Lady Ogilvy. The RCMI is supported by fees, donations, and the volunteer services of private members.

== Mission ==
The RCMI focuses on defense, security, and foreign affairs, seeking to provide a collegial education environment; lead related Canadian discussion and research; promote the study of military strategy, arts, and literature; and develop a national identity of unification and independence through public awareness of military history.

== Programming ==
The RCMI outreach to the public consists of a speakers program, educational conferences, seminars, open forums and events. The RCMI events include Batoche dinners, guest speakers, Christmas parties, reserve force and regimental dinners. Regular lectures on aspects of Canadian military history, international affairs, and military strategy are held, often as part of the RCMI’s Military History Nights and Defence Studies Committee Roundtables and Luncheons.

The RCMI prepares and publishes original papers, studies and journals related to military and strategic issues, foreign affairs, and artefacts: the 'RCMI Commentary', 'Sitrep', 'The General Sir William Otter Papers', and 'Heritage Papers'. The RCMI has also published annual yearbooks.

The RCMI has a museum, archive, library, art collection, publications and online resources. The exhibitions focus on the evolution of Canadian military arms, equipment, and uniforms.

Following a four-year reconstruction, the RCMI returned to its new quarters at 426 University Avenue at the beginning of June 2014. The RCMI offers overnight accommodations and food and beverage service.

== History ==
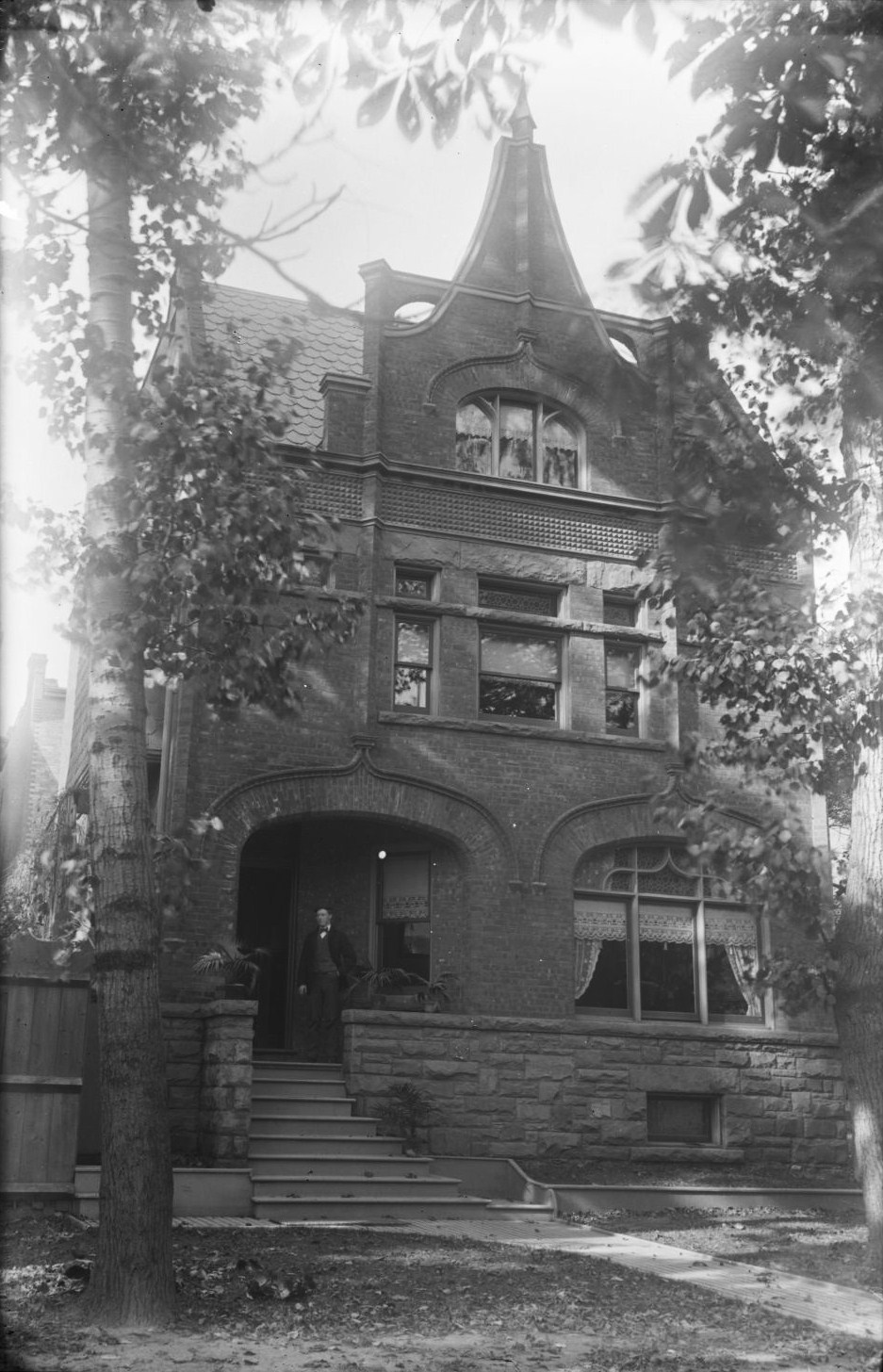
The Canadian Military Institute's premises in 1896

=== Canadian Military Institute ===
On January 14, 1890, 50 officers of the Toronto Garrison founded the Royal Canadian Military Institute, then known as the Canadian Military Institute (CMI), with the then governor general of Canada, Lord Stanley, as its patron. The Militia Institute, which was organized in 1878, presented 200 military volumes on the founding of the institute. Although the founders sought to enrol 50 to 100 members by the end of 1890, 162 resident and 122 non-resident members had joined. The headquarters of the Canadian Military Institute in 1896 was on University Avenue.

In 1907, the CMI acquired 243-5 Simcoe Street, which is at the rear of its current premises. On August 29, 1907, the then governor general, Earl Grey, laid the cornerstone. William Craven Vaux Chadwick, architect, designed the new CMI Library on University Avenue in 1908.

In 1912, CMI acquired the front of the present premises on University Avenue and the then governor general, the Duke of Connaught, laid the cornerstone.

Col. J. B. McLean was the last of the founders of the RCMI to die; he served as honorary president of the RCMI from 1948 until his death in 1951.

The institute's founding president was Lieutenant Colonel William Dillon Otter, formerly adjutant of The Queen's Own Rifles of Canada. He went on to become one of Canada's most distinguished military figures, ending his career as General Sir William Otter KCB CMG CVO, Inspector-General of Militia of Canada. Colonel Otter set the founding objectives of the institute, to be "the Promotion and Fostering of Military Art, Science and Literature in Canada."

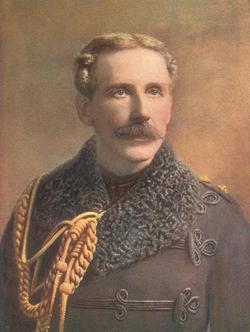
LCol William Dillon Otter in 1900

Col. J. M. Gibson was the first vice-president of CMI; he later served as Lieutenant-Governor of Ontario and was the father of the Honourable Mr. Justice Col. Colin Gibson, an honorary life member of the institute. The first secretary at CMI was Lt. Homfray Irving, a member of the Old Eighteen (first cadets at Royal Military College of Canada), the first battalion sergeant major at R.M.C., winner of the Sword of Honour at R.M.C. and the first president of the R.M.C. Club of Canada.

Membership was limited from 1890-1940 to army officers and ex-officers of Her Majesty’s forces. In 1940, membership was limited to army, navy, and air officers and ex-officers of Her Majesty’s forces. In 1940 the executive committee of the RCMI agreed to change the name of the RCMI to the Canadian Officers' Club and Institute, and to provide navy officers with wardroom.

As 1914 approached, the institute was operating at a financial loss, and the executive considered closure. With the outbreak of the Great War in 1914, there was a large number of potential membership candidates. From 1919–1930 the financial position of the institute and membership were healthy. After 1930, the membership dwindled a little each year, owing to deaths and resignations. With the Great Depression it was uncertain whether the institute could survive. Resignations increased since many members could not afford the yearly membership fee of $15. Some affluent citizens who had resigned from their $100-a-year clubs, but still wanted a club to belong to, joined the CMI. In 1935, accounts were short by $52,000. Although criminal prosecution was pointless, so far as collecting the balance was concerned, a cheque for $35,000 was sent by the bonding company. The $17,000, which could have been a death blow to the institute, was written off. In 1935, the executive considered closing. A new finance committee was set up, chaired by Lt. Col. F. S. McPherson, who kept the institute in the black during the period he was either president or chairman of the finance committee, from 1936 to 1953 inclusive, except for two years he was overseas on active service. Under McPherson an annual budget was prepared in advance and adhered to. Once a dollar was banked, it stayed in the bank. Entrance fees were banked and the institute operated on annual fees. The "chit" system was abolished and members were put on a cash basis. These sound financial principles prevail today. From 1936 until 1958, the institute operated at a profit.

In 1943, a captain of the Canadian Women's Army Corps presented herself to the secretary with the membership application and demanded membership. Although the bylaws did not specify that members had to be male, she was denied membership. Some concessions were made to women. Wives of members were permitted to attend on "Open Nights", usually held once a month. Members could entertain their female guests at the Ladies Lounge, where drinks and dinner were available daily at five o'clock.

=== The Canadian Officers' Club and Institute ===
In 1946, Commander A. C. Turner, who was the first naval officer to serve as president of the Institute, insisted that the name of the Institute be changed to "The Canadian Officers' Club and Institute", although he opted to forego a Navy wardroom.

=== Royal Canadian Military Institute ===
In 1948, the Institute had its first Air Force officer as president. In 1948, the Honourable Colin Gibson, who served as the Secretary of State agreed to consult with the Sovereign through the proper channels about granting the Institute the prefix "Royal", provided the Institute changed its name back to Canadian Military Institute. The application granting the Institute the prefix "Royal" was granted by George VI in 1948.

In 1948, a record profit year, the Institute could have remitted all annual fees to their members and still have shown a slight profit. As World War II receded, the membership declined. Many commanding officers urged their regular forces and reserve officers to join. The Institute reduced the $25 entrance fee and $35 annual dues to serving officers of both the reserve and the active services.

To contribute to the 'New Building Fund', a lot to the south was sold for $150,000, a tax on beer added $50,000, bequests by deceased members, notably one from Major James Bell, of $15,000 and surpluses were added to the RCMI coffers. The Executive Committee of the RCMI acquired a 75-foot lot to the south of the present clubhouse for $1,000 a foot to build a new clubhouse. In 1955, the back part of the clubhouse, which was over 100 years old was demonished and rebuilt.

In 1948, the RCMI membership was 2389, but by 1958, the RCMI membership had dwindled to 1925. Many members lived in the Toronto area; however, there was also a non-resident membership fee for members who lived in other parts of Canada but visited Toronto from time to time. By 1958, seven or eight dinner meetings were held each year at the Institute.

The announcement of the RCMI Letters Patent was made on November 23, 1991, in Volume 125, page 3770 of the Canada Gazette.

With the support of a majority of the members, the RCMI entered into an agreement in late 2008 to demolish the existing, aged building and allow development of a 42-storey condominium tower in exchange for a larger space in freehold in the new building. The historic facade, and much of the interior, was recreated in the RCMI's space in the new building, while freeing the institute from the increasing costs of maintaining a century-old building.

The Institute closed its building with a flag-lowering ceremony on June 18, 2010. The RCMI's century-old home at 426 University Avenue was demolished in 2010. Following a four-year reconstruction, the RCMI returned to its new quarters at 426 University Avenue at the beginning of June 2014.

From 2010 to 2014, members met at the Albany Club on King Street during the construction period, and the popular events of the RCMI, including Military History Nights and meetings of the Strategic Studies Committee, continued. Library and museum items were stored in appropriate locations, and work on the collections continued during the time away from 426 University.

== Past presidents ==
Ex-cadets of the Royal Military College of Canada are welcomed as members of the Institute, and several past presidents are ex-cadets.

- Lt.-Col. later General Sir William Dillon Otter, K.C.B., C.M.G., C.V.O., Inspector-General of Militia of Canada (1st)
- No. 425 Col. F. C. Denison, C.M.G. (3rd)
- No. 797 Col. William Hendrie, V.D.
- No. 186 Maj.-Gen. V. A. S. Williams, C.M.G.
- No. 181 Maj.-Gen. J. A. Gunn, C.M.G., D.S.O., V.D.
- No. 1472 SXL Sherburne Tupper Bigelow
- No. 1446 WXC H. E. Boulter, E.D.
- No. 1783 Lt.-Col. W. W. G. Darling, D.S.O., E.D.

== Honorary life members ==
- The Honourable Mr. Justice Col. Colin Gibson, C.M.G., M.C., V.D.
- Lt.-Col. F. S. McPherson, M.C., M.M., V.D.

Officer-holders of the Victoria Cross are automatically elected Honorary Life Members of the Institute:

- No. 943 Air Marshal W. A. Bishop, V.C., C.B., D.S.O., M.C., D.F.C.
- No. 1866 Lt.-Col. C. C. I. Merritt, V.C., E.D.
- Major Frederick Albert Tilston VC

== Membership ==
Membership in the CMI was limited from 1890–1940 to male army officers and ex-officers of Her Majesty’s forces. By 1912, members of the Institute were mostly serving officers of the militia, with a few veterans who had served of the North-West Rebellion, the Boer War, and the Crimean War.

In 1940, membership was limited to male army, navy and air officers and ex-officers of Her Majesty’s forces. In 1948, membership was denied to women. In 1958, although many members live in the Toronto area, there was a non-resident membership fee for members who lived in various parts of Canada but visit Toronto from time to time. Applications are made for membership, moved and seconded by other members, posted on the board for a minimum period of 197 days and voted on by the Executive Committee. There are no membership drives and no organized efforts to bring in new members.

Today, membership is open to men and women, both military and non-military.

== Royal Canadian Military Institute Museum ==
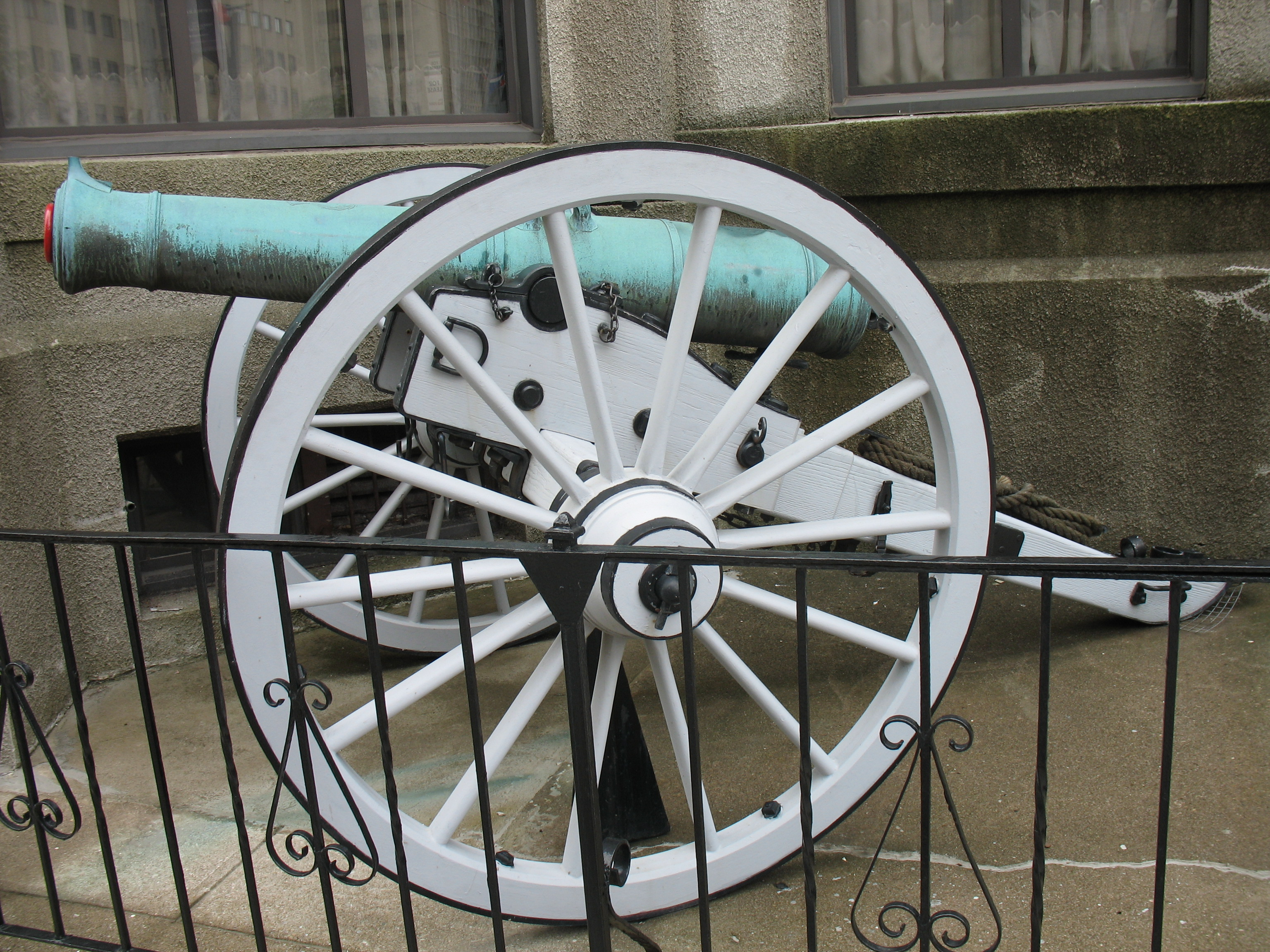
One of two bronze 9 pounder guns owned by the RCMI

The RCMI Museum programming involves the conservation and preservation of its collections. The Institute's museum collection includes primitive and modern weaponry such as guns, swords, spears, other weapons from around the world. Artifacts and other military memorabilia, many donated by members, include flags, badges, uniforms, and medals. Captain Roy Brown, who was officially credited with shooting down Baron Manfred von Richthofen, the "Red Baron", in 1918, donated the seat of the Red Baron's Fokker triplane.

The art collection, with an emphases on Canadian and British Military History, includes: miniatures, photographs, Sketches, watercolours, prints, photographs, and oil paintings. The RCMI also has a collection of British, American, and French soldier figurines.

== Royal Canadian Military Institute Library ==
The Militia Institute, which was organized in 1878, presented 200 military volumes on the founding of the Institute. Dating back to the eighteenth century, the library has military manuals, service journals, periodicals, and rare books. William Craven Vaux Chadwick, architect, designed the new CMI Library on University Avenue Canadian in 1908. By 1958, the RCMI accumulated over 12,000 military and quasi-military books. The library includes a collection of Canadian regimental histories, squadron, and ship histories, books published in the Napoleonic era, army lists dating back to 1746 and British and Canadian officer lists for the army, navy and air force. The library has one of 4 collections of 134 volumes of correspondence exchanged in the United States Civil War in 134 volumes. Two of the other copies are in the Congress Library at Washington and the Smithsonian Institution in Baltimore. Col. George A Drew, who wrote "Canada's Fighting Airmen” in the Institute Library, described the Library as "a unique treasury of British and Canadian military literature and journalism.” The Library has a collection of Canadian Official War Photographs of World War One. There is collection of Canadian Expeditionary Force Casualty and Nominal Rolls, as well as Orders of Battle, for World War I and World War II.

== Arms ==
Coat of arms of Royal Canadian Military Institute

Notes
Granted 14 November 1990
Crest
Rising out of an Ontario coronet (maple leaves Gules and trillium flowers Argent leaved Vert seeded Or set on a rim Or) a demi lion winged Or bearing in its dexter paw a sword Argent its sinister paw resting on a fouled anchor Azure.
Escutcheon
Quarterly first Or three maple leaves conjoined on one stem Vert second Azure a lion rampant holding in its dexter paw a fleur-de-lys Or third Argent a saltire Azure charged at the centre with an inescutcheon Or bearing a thistle Gules fourth Or a lymphad oars in action Azure pennons Gules all within a bordure quarterly Gules and Argent.
Supporters
On a grassy mound dexter a horse Argent crined and unguled Or sinister a lion Ermine each supporter gorged with a collar Gules pendant therefrom a torteau charged with the Royal Crown Proper.

== See also ==
- Royal United Services Institute
