= University Avenue (Toronto) =

Street in Toronto, Ontario, Canada

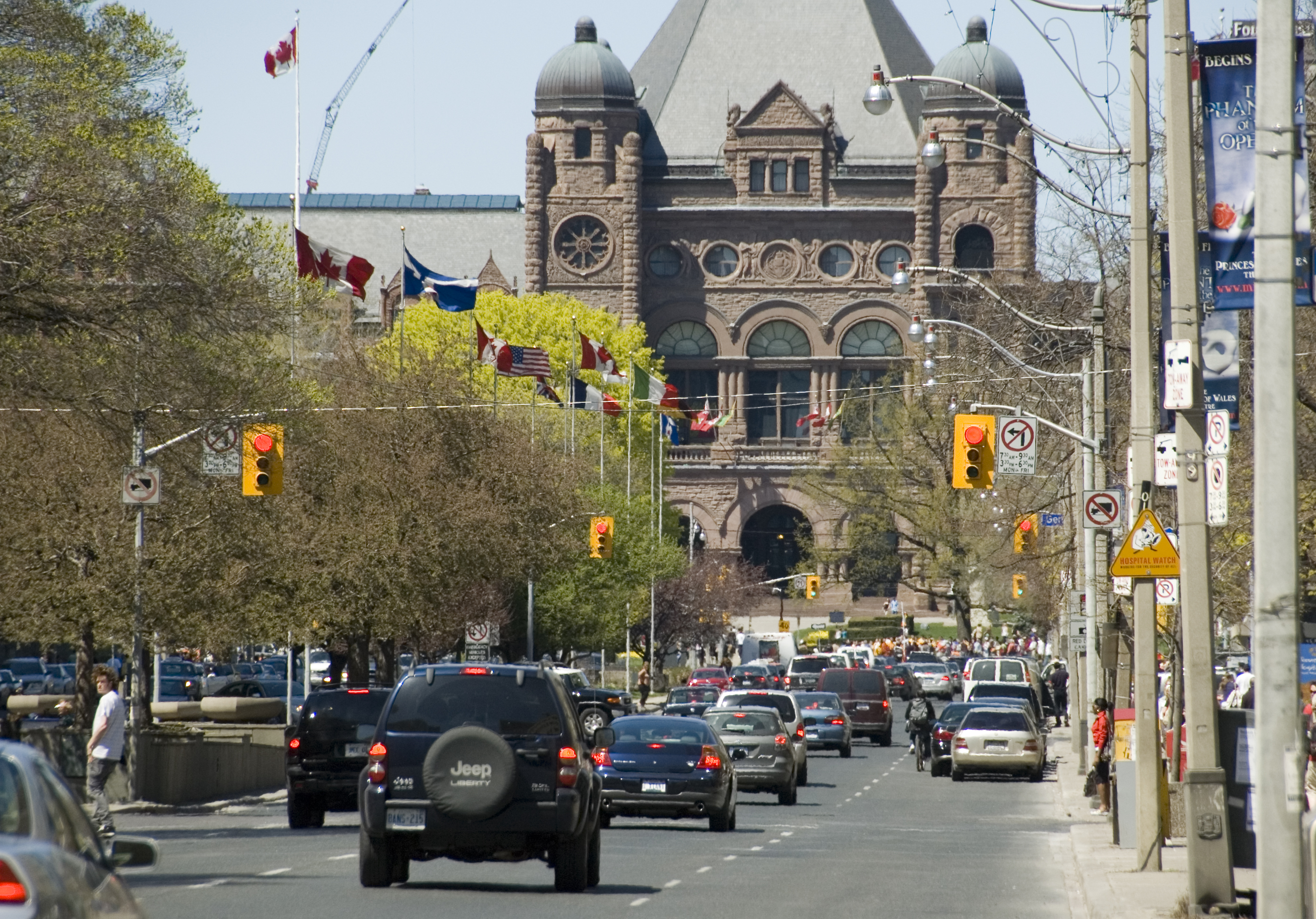
- University Avenue near College Street, with the Ontario Legislative Building visible in the background

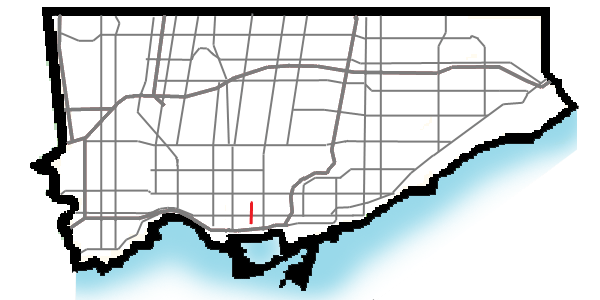
- Namesake: University of Toronto
- Maintained by: City of Toronto
- South end: Front Street
- Major junctions: Gerrard Street; King Street; Queen Street West
- North end: College Street (continues north as Queen's Park Crescent East/West)

Other
Nearby arterial roads in Toronto
← Spadina Avenue	Yonge Street →

University Avenue is a major north–south road in Downtown Toronto, Ontario, Canada. Beginning at Front Street West in the south, the thoroughfare heads north to end at College Street and the south end of the University of Toronto's St. George campus and Queen's Park.

At its north end, the Ontario Legislative Building serves as a prominent terminating vista. Many of Toronto's most important institutions are located along the eight-lane wide street such as Osgoode Hall and other legal institutions, the Four Seasons Centre, major hospitals conducting research and teaching, and landmark office buildings for the commercial sector, notably major financial and insurance industry firms. The portion of University Avenue between Queen Street West and College Street is laid out as a boulevard, with several memorials, statues, gardens, and fountains concentrated in a landscaped median dividing the opposite directions of travel, giving it a ceremonial character.

Despite the avenue's name, the University of Toronto's main campus is primarily located on the neighbouring St. George Street.

== Route description ==
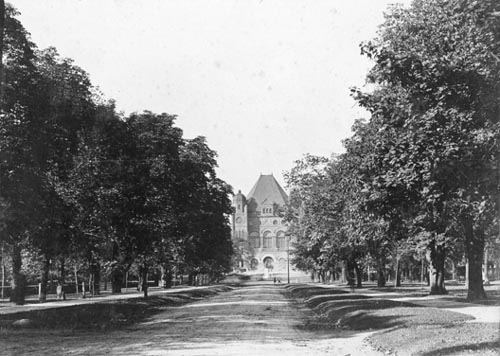
University Avenue near College Street, c. 1900

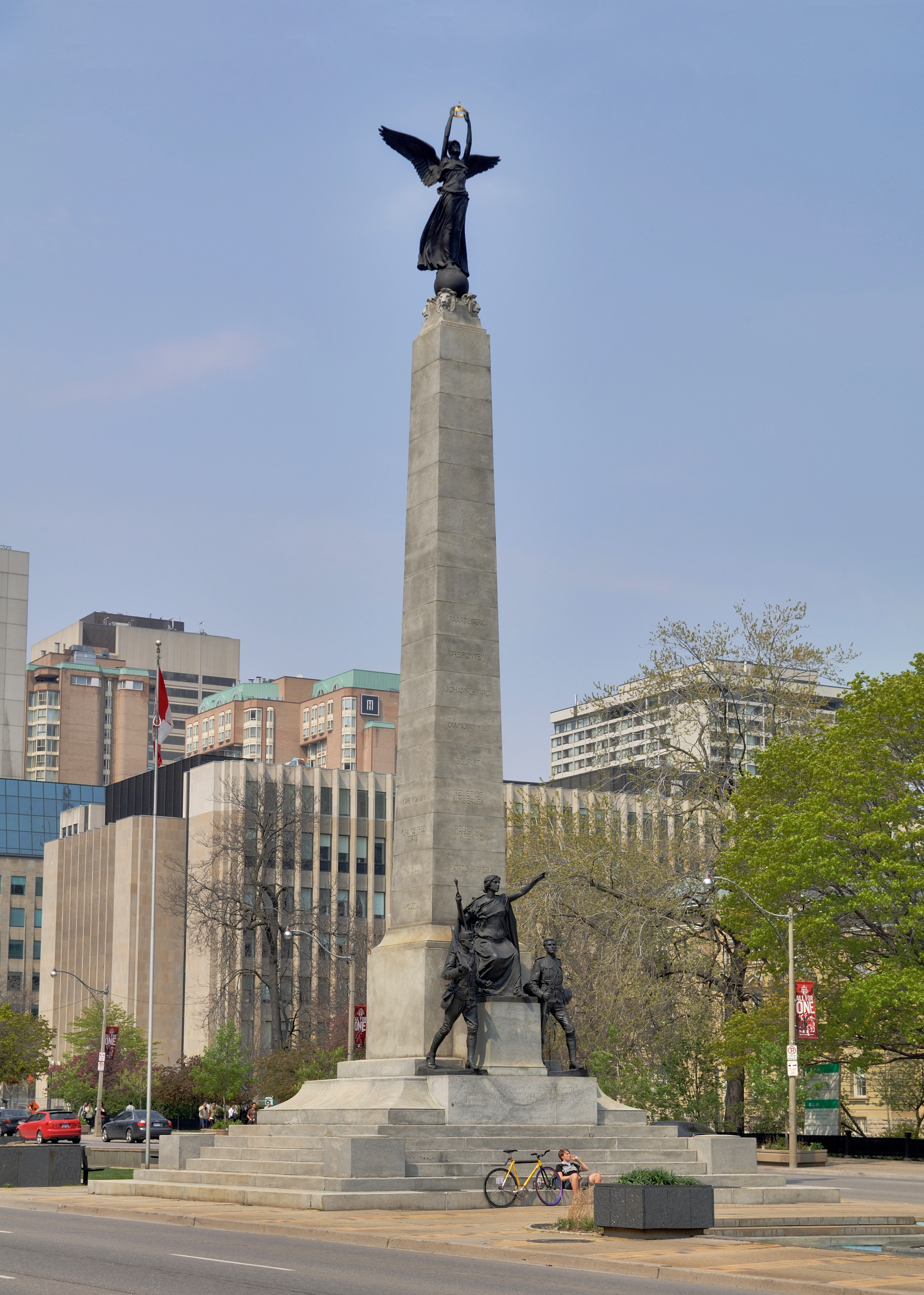
The soaring South African War Memorial by Walter Seymour Allward stands in the median just north of Queen Street West

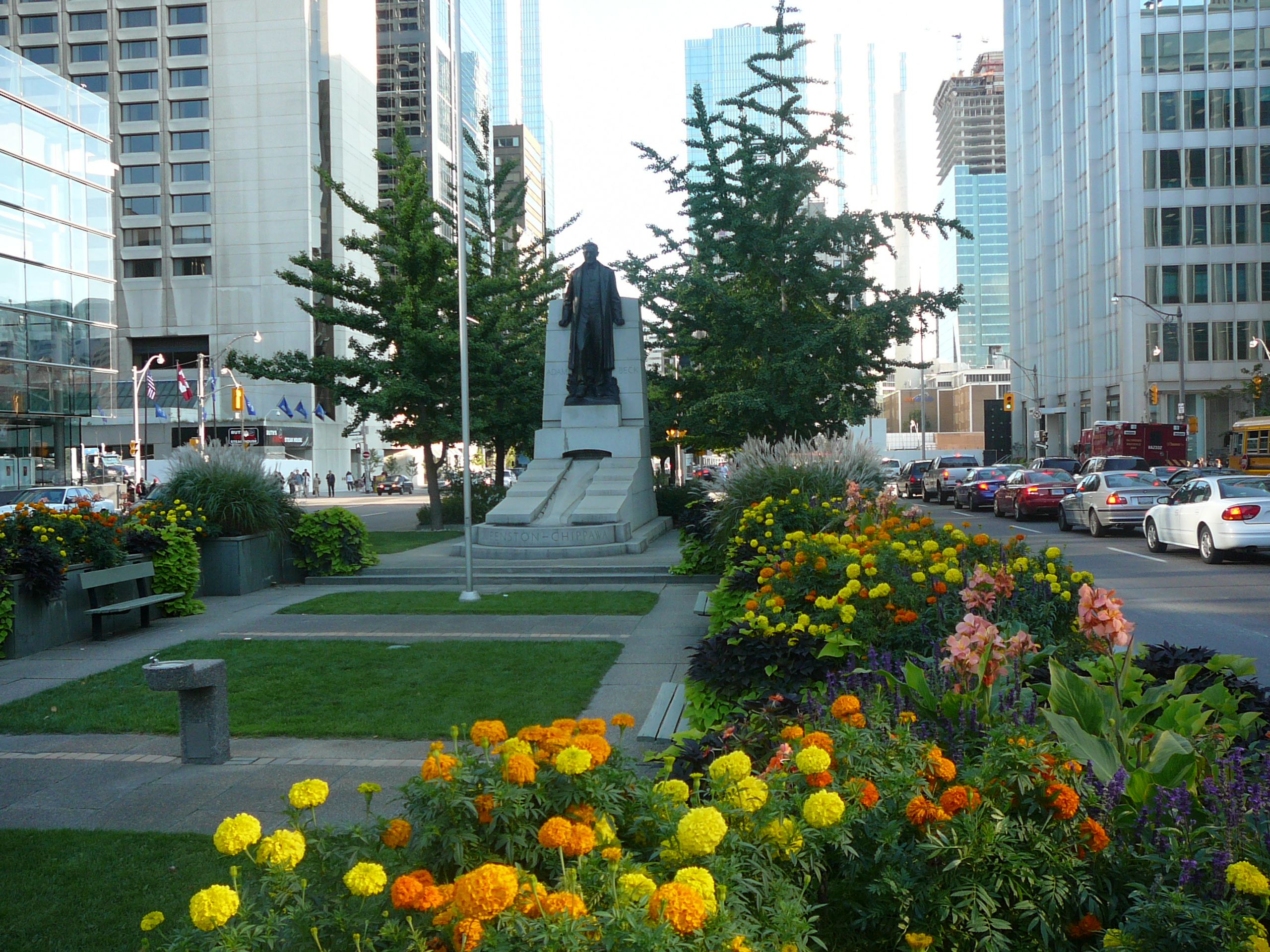
The Adam Beck Memorial is located in the landscaped median, between northbound and southbound lanes just south of Queen Street West

University Avenue begins at the intersection of Front and York streets near Union Station and heads northwest for a short distance before turning north. Lanes on the left ends as ramp to underground parking garage. At Adelaide Street West, the avenue divides slightly, leaving room for a median of greenery and sculptures between the north and southbound lanes. Southbound University runs diagonally to meet with York Street at Front Street West then continues south as York Street to Queens Quay and ends as a driveway signed as Harbour Square.

The avenue ends at College Street, where it splits into Queen's Park Crescent East (northbound) and Queen's Park Crescent West (southbound). Between these two roads is Queen's Park, the home of the Ontario Legislative Building. This landmark creates a terminating vista for those looking north along University. The legislature's site was originally home to the main building of the University of Toronto, and this is the origin of the avenue's name. Today, the university's St. George campus surrounds the legislature building. Queen's Park Crescent is a single street north to Bloor Street.

North of Bloor Street, the road continues as Avenue Road. University Avenue and Avenue Road were once designated as Highway 11A.

While Yonge Street is the emotional heart of the city and Bay Street the financial hub, University Avenue is Toronto's most ceremonial thoroughfare, with many of the city's most prominent institutions. The boulevard is unusually wide for Canadian cities (except for Winnipeg), as it expands from 6 lanes wide (just past the jog at Front and York streets) to eight lanes wide (just past the divide past Adelaide Street). The speed limit is 40 km/h below Gerrard St, reduced from 50 km/h. The speed limit was reduced from 60 to 50 in May–June 2009.

The northernmost part of the street is dominated by a series of hospitals including Toronto General Hospital, Mount Sinai Hospital, the Princess Margaret Cancer Centre, Toronto Rehabilitation Institute, and The Hospital for Sick Children. The concentration of hospitals on this portion of the street has led to it being given the nickname "Hospital Row" by locals and the media. The intersection of University and College is also home to the headquarters of Ontario Power Generation.

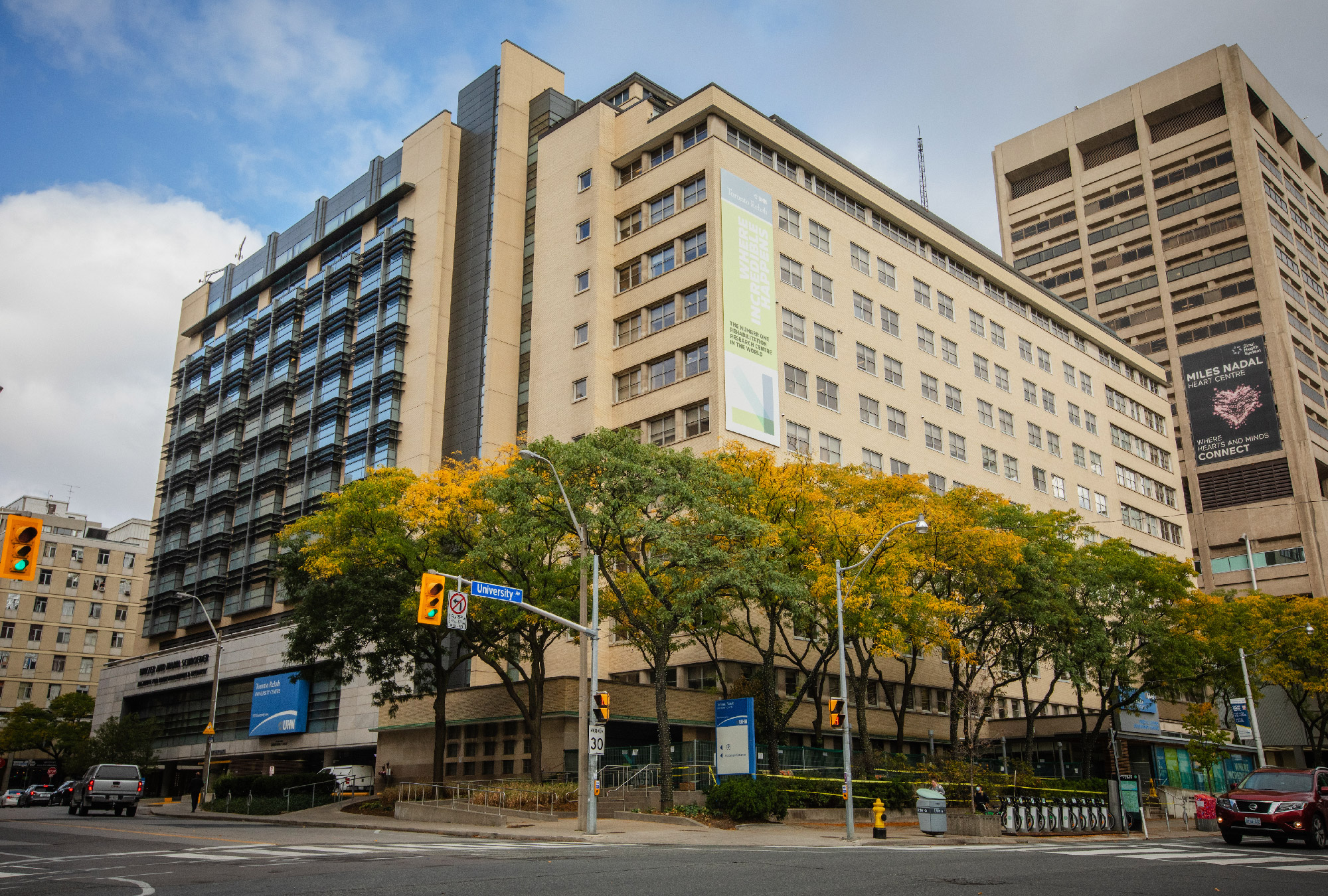
The Toronto Rehabilitation Institute at University Avenue and Elm Street. Mount Sinai Hospital is the tall building to the right.

The rest of the street is home to a variety of corporate offices and government buildings. Historically, this imposing street has been met with mixed reviews. Noted Canadian author and historian Pierre Berton commented that University Avenue "was rendered antiseptic by the presence of hospitals and insurance offices...the pristine display of wall-to-wall concrete that ran from Front Street to Queen's Park."

University Avenue has matured and mellowed somewhat since Berton's unfavourable observation, though paving is still characterized by poured concrete and asphalt for most sidewalks and roadway. Restaurants now dot the southern end of University Avenue. The Four Seasons Centre at the intersection of University Avenue and Queen Street was completed in 2006 and is the home of the Canadian Opera Company and the National Ballet of Canada. Osgoode Hall presents stately architecture and a welcome green space. During the holiday season, festive lights illuminate the trees and shrubs of the boulevard. Unlike most major streets in Toronto, there are no rooftop billboards visible from University Avenue due to a bylaw.

A portion of the University line portion of the Yonge-University-Spadina subway line runs the length of University Avenue.

== History ==
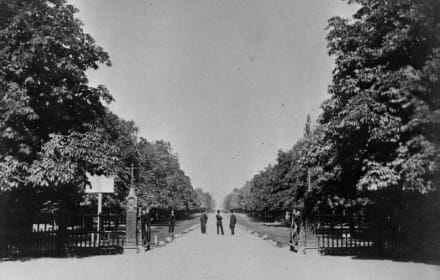
Looking north up University Avenue, from Queen Street, in 1867.

University Avenue was originally made up of two streets, College Avenue and University Street, and separated by a fence, but it was eventually removed and the streets were merged. The merged street ended at Queen Street until 1931, when it was extended southward to Front Street.

After World War Two the avenue was transformed. Trees were cut down and four lanes, in each direction, were devoted to cars and trucks. A central median has some trees, monuments, and park benches, which are lightly used, because strollers are surrounded by noisy traffic.

=== Bike lane installation ===
As part of the City of Toronto's response to the COVID-19 pandemic, a number of temporary dedicated bike lanes were installed across Toronto in 2020, including on University Avenue. These lanes, from Bloor Street to King Street were made permanent in 2021.

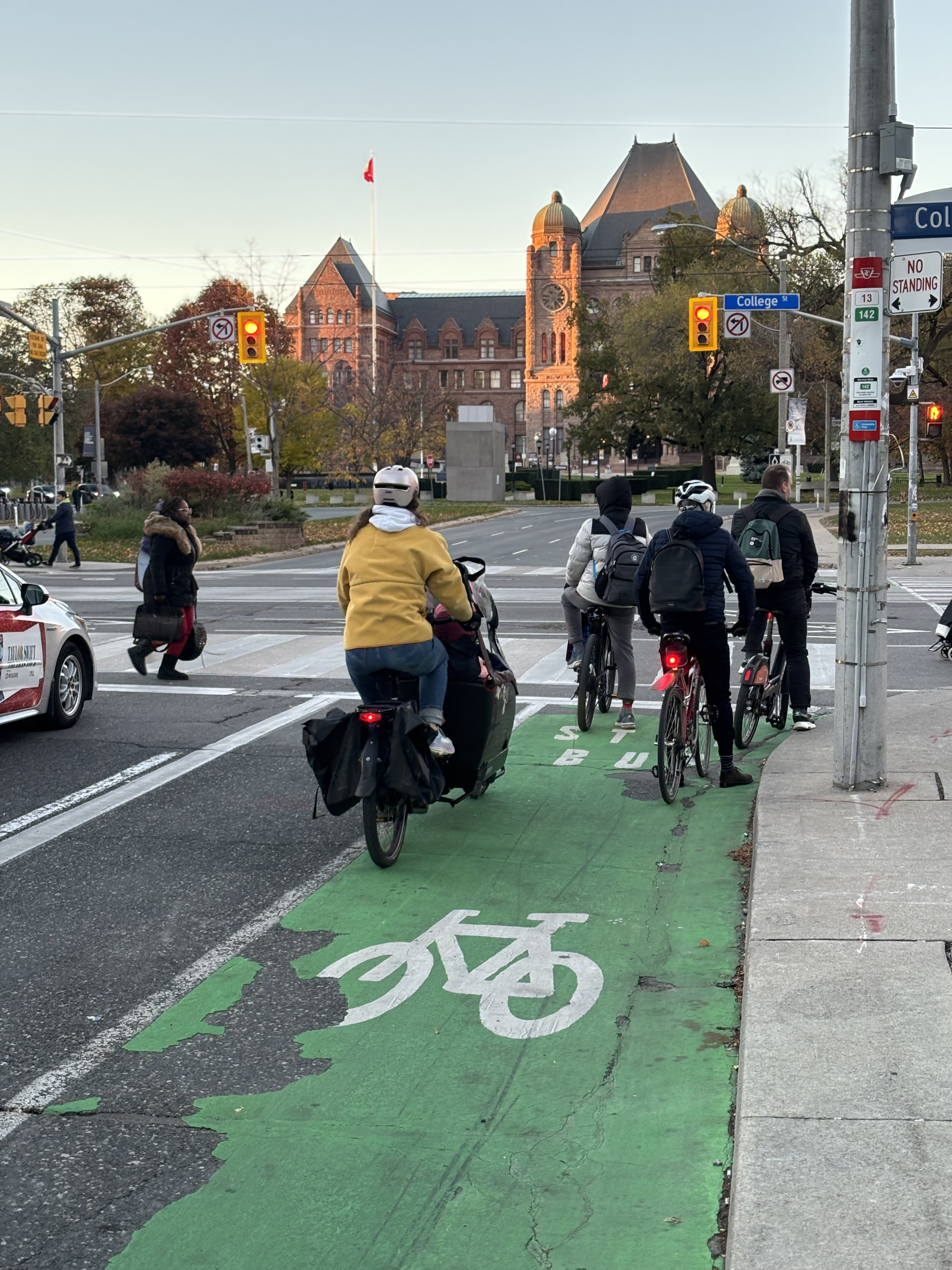
Cyclists using the bicycle lane on University Avenue, November 2024.

Premier Doug Ford introduced legislation to remove the bike lanes over the wishes of the city, but the plan was struck down by the Ontario Superior Court after a Charter challenge that their removal threatened the safety of cyclists.

== Future ==
In 2020 the city changed how lanes were allocated on University Avenue's pavement. Only two lanes, per direction, were devoted to cars and trucks. A lane was devoted to parking, and room was made for a bicycle lane.

According to The Globe and Mail it has been proposed to return approximately half of the width of the broad avenue to parkland. The 9.5 acres (3.8 hectares) of parkland would cost $230 million, compared with the anticipated $1.7 billion cost for the proposed Rail Deck Park's 20 acres (8.1 hectares). The park would extend from the Royal Ontario Museum, at Bloor Street, to the green space that surround Osgoode Hall, on Queen Street. When the greenspace around Osgoode Hall, and adjacent Nathan Phillips Square, and Queen's Park, surrounding the legislature are counted, University Avenue Park would connect 90 acres (36 hectares) of greenspace and public space.

The plans include restoring a section of Taddle Creek that once flowed beside University Avenue.

== Landmarks ==
University Avenue features many landmark buildings and monuments. Some of these include (from south to north):

- Union Station
- Sun Life Centre
- Shangri-La Toronto
- Sun Life Building, 200 University Avenue
- Bank of Canada Building
- Four Seasons Centre
- Adam Beck Memorial - Emanuel Hahn
- South African War Memorial
- Campbell House
- Osgoode Hall
- Canada Life Building
- Toronto Courthouse
- United States Consulate General of Toronto
- University Club of Toronto
- Royal Canadian Military Institute
- Canadian Airman's Memorial
- Toronto Rehabilitation Institute
- The Hospital for Sick Children
- Mount Sinai Hospital
- Toronto General Hospital
- Princess Margaret Cancer Centre
- Ontario Power Building
- Robert Hood Saunders Memorial – Emanuel Hahn
- MaRS Discovery District
- University of Toronto (St. George campus)
  - Leslie Dan Faculty of Pharmacy
  - Schwartz Reisman Innovation Campus
- Ontario Legislative Building, Queen's Park
