= Saskatchewan Railway Museum =

Railway museum in Saskatchewan, Canada

Coordinates: 52°04′40″N 106°48′59″W

Saskatchewan Railroad Historical Association
- Company type: Not for profit
- Industry: Museum
- Founded: 1990
- Headquarters: Corman Park No. 344, near Saskatoon, Saskatchewan, Canada
- Key people: Saskatchewan Railroad Historical Association (SRHA) volunteers
- Products: Restoration and exhibits
- Number of employees: NA
- Website: saskrailmuseum.org

The Saskatchewan Railway Museum is a railway museum located west of Saskatoon, Saskatchewan at the intersection of the Pike Lake Highway (Hwy 60) and the Canadian National Railway tracks (on "Hawker" siding). It is operated by the Saskatchewan Railroad Historical Association (SRHA) and was opened in 1990. The museum hosts a 3.2 meter mural of the planet Jupiter, for the art-project, the "North American Solar System" and was created by Roman Rabbitskin.

== Images ==
Buildings and exhibits on the Saskatchewan Railway Museum

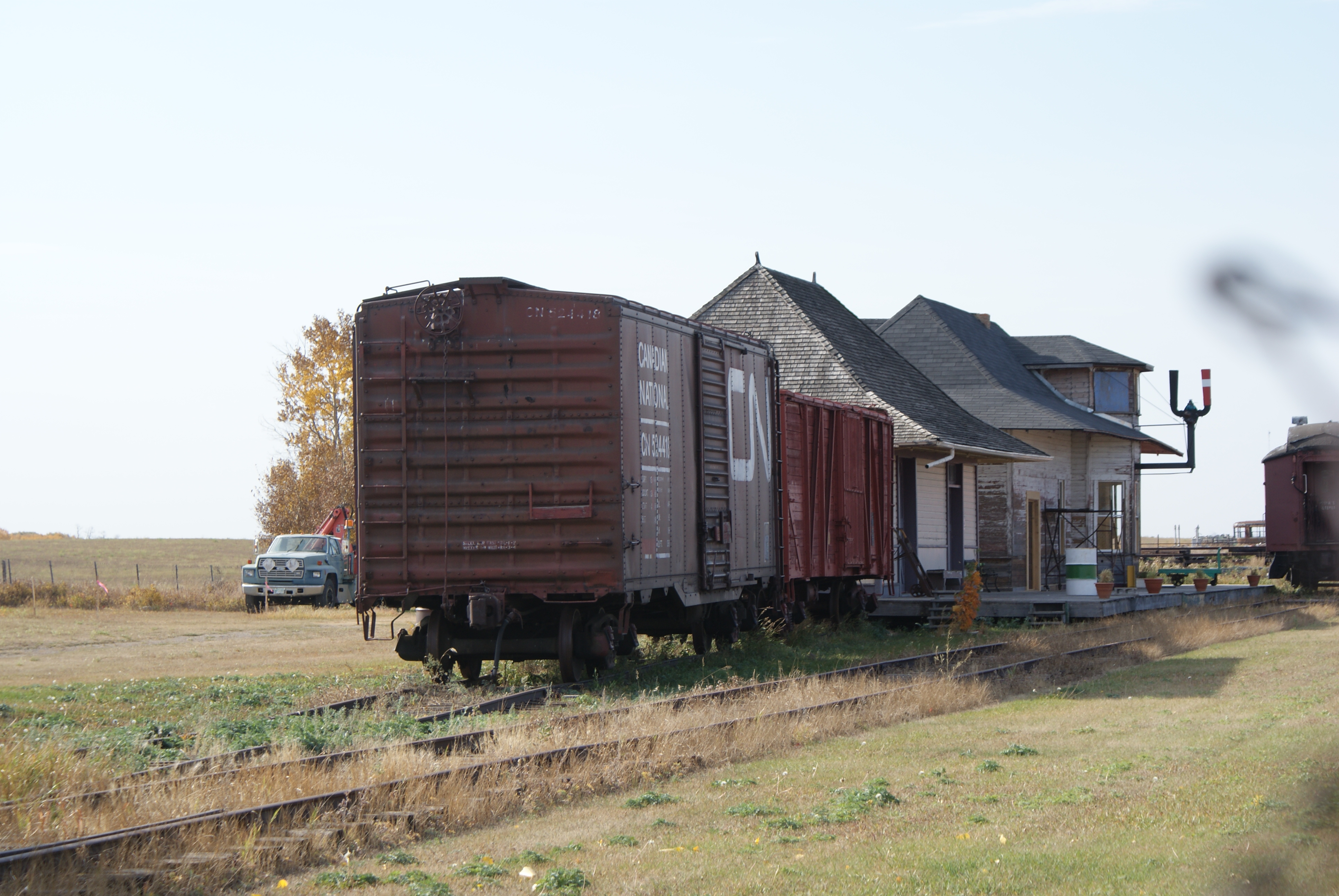
CNR boxcars Unity baggage shed, and Argo Train Station

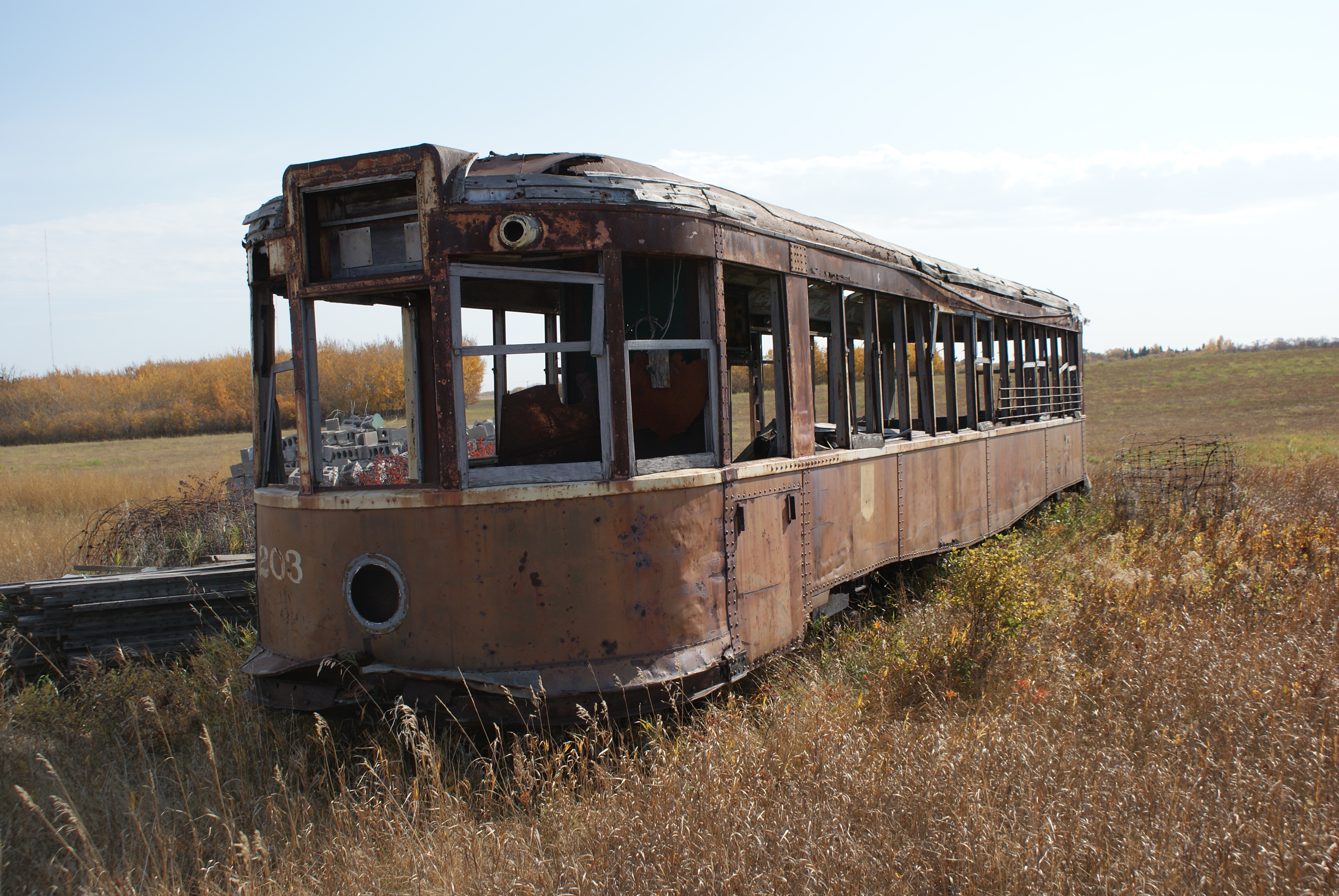
Saskatchewan Railway Museum

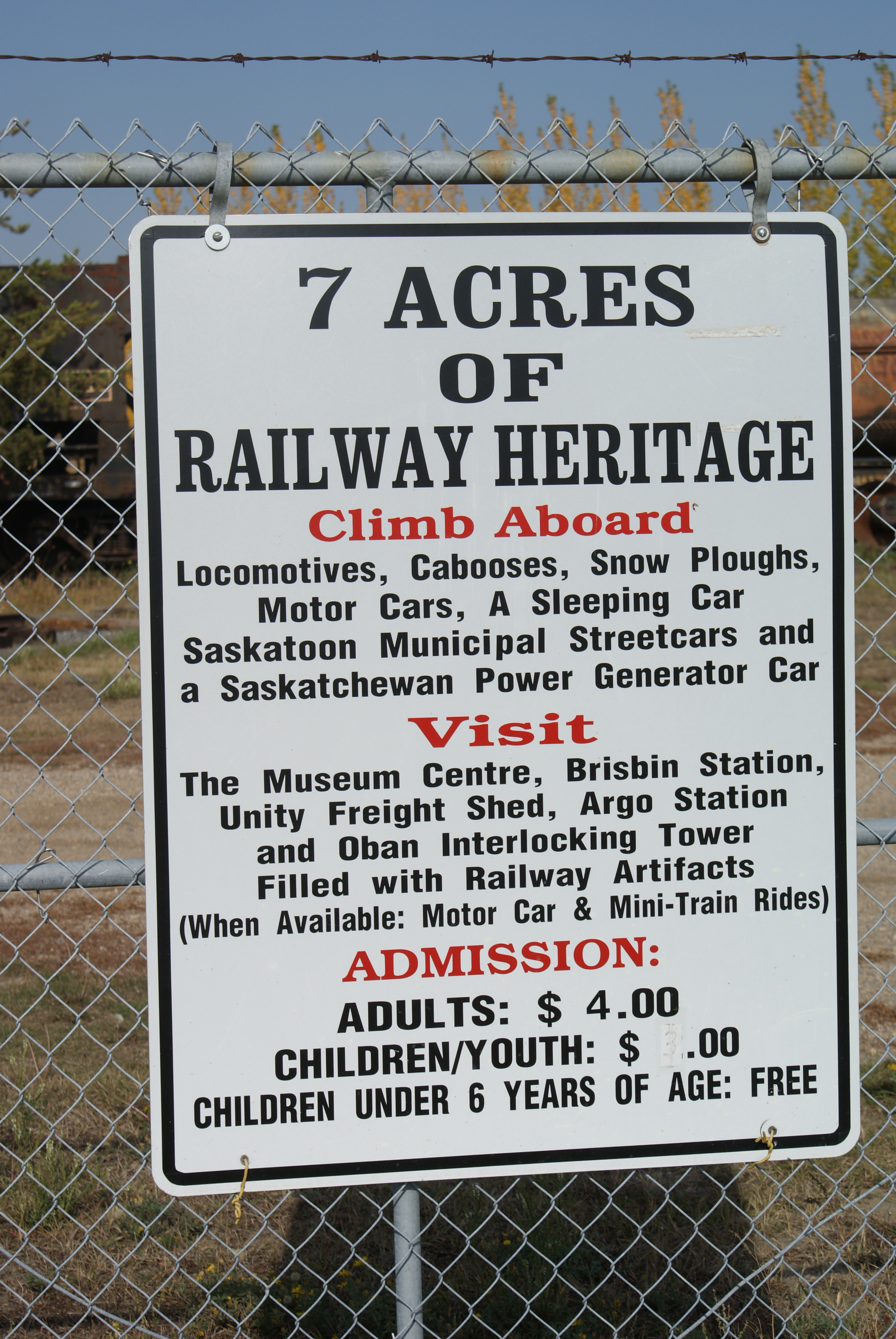
Welcome sign to Saskatchewan Railway Museum

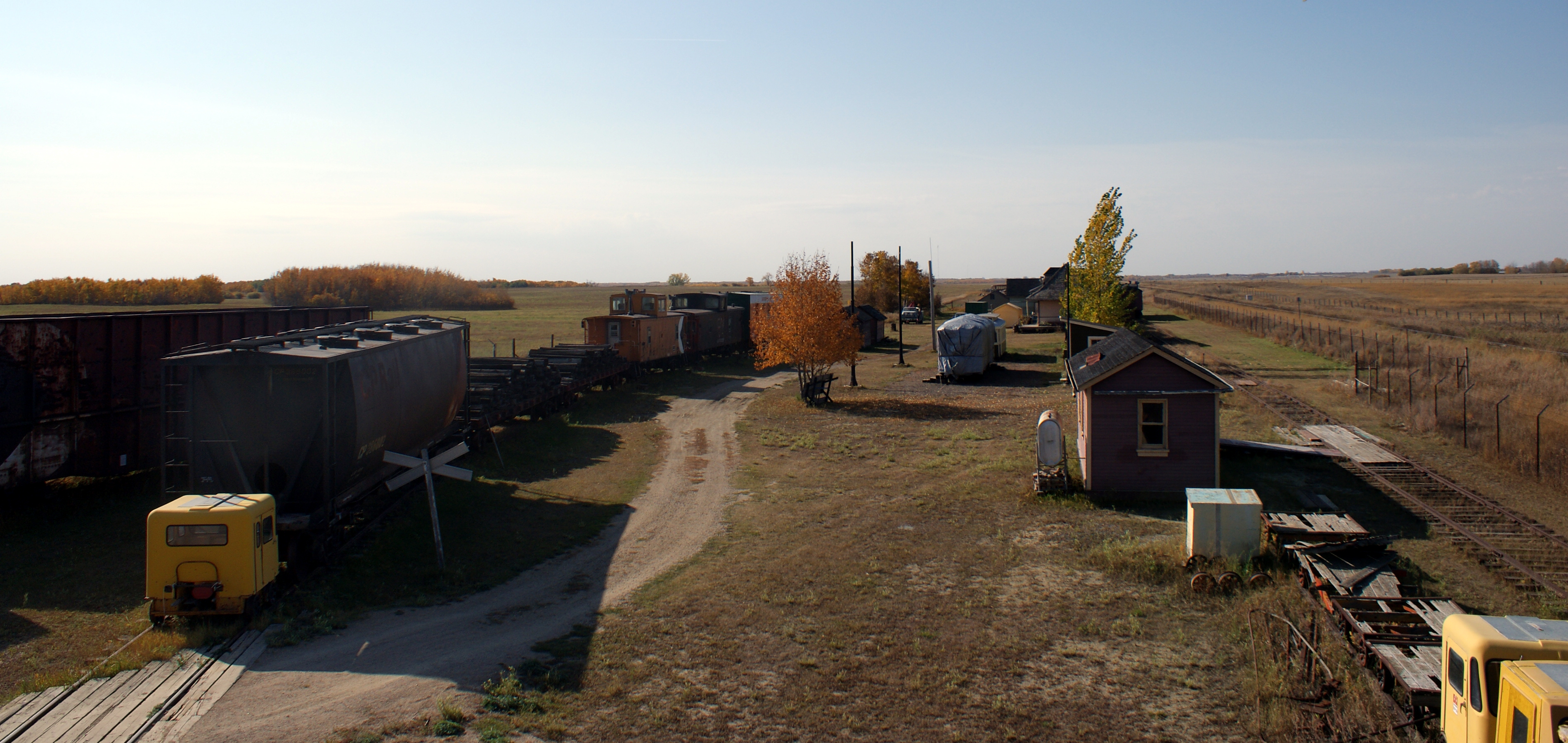
Saskatchewan Railway Museum eastern half

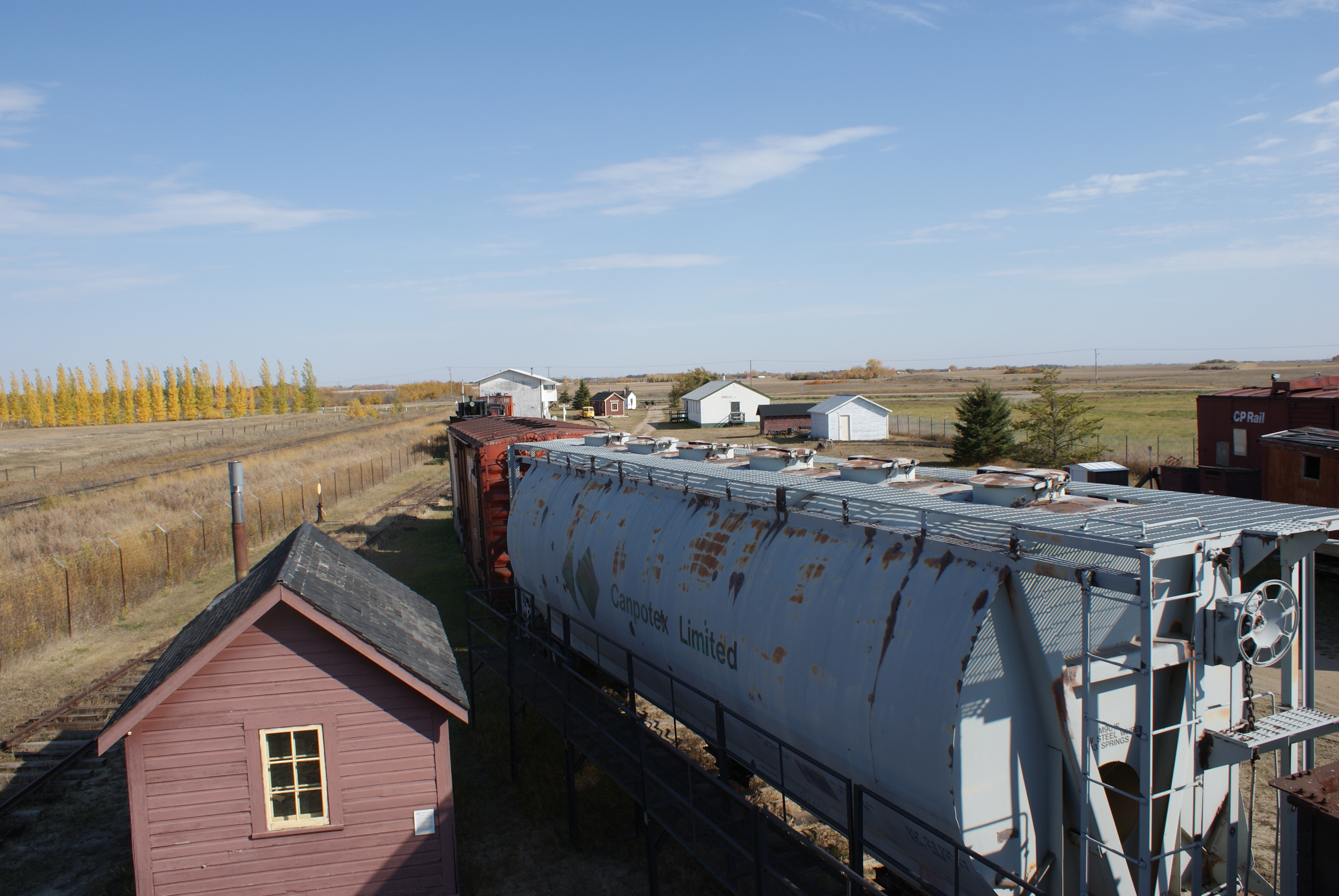
Saskatchewan Railway Museum western half Canpotex Potash Car

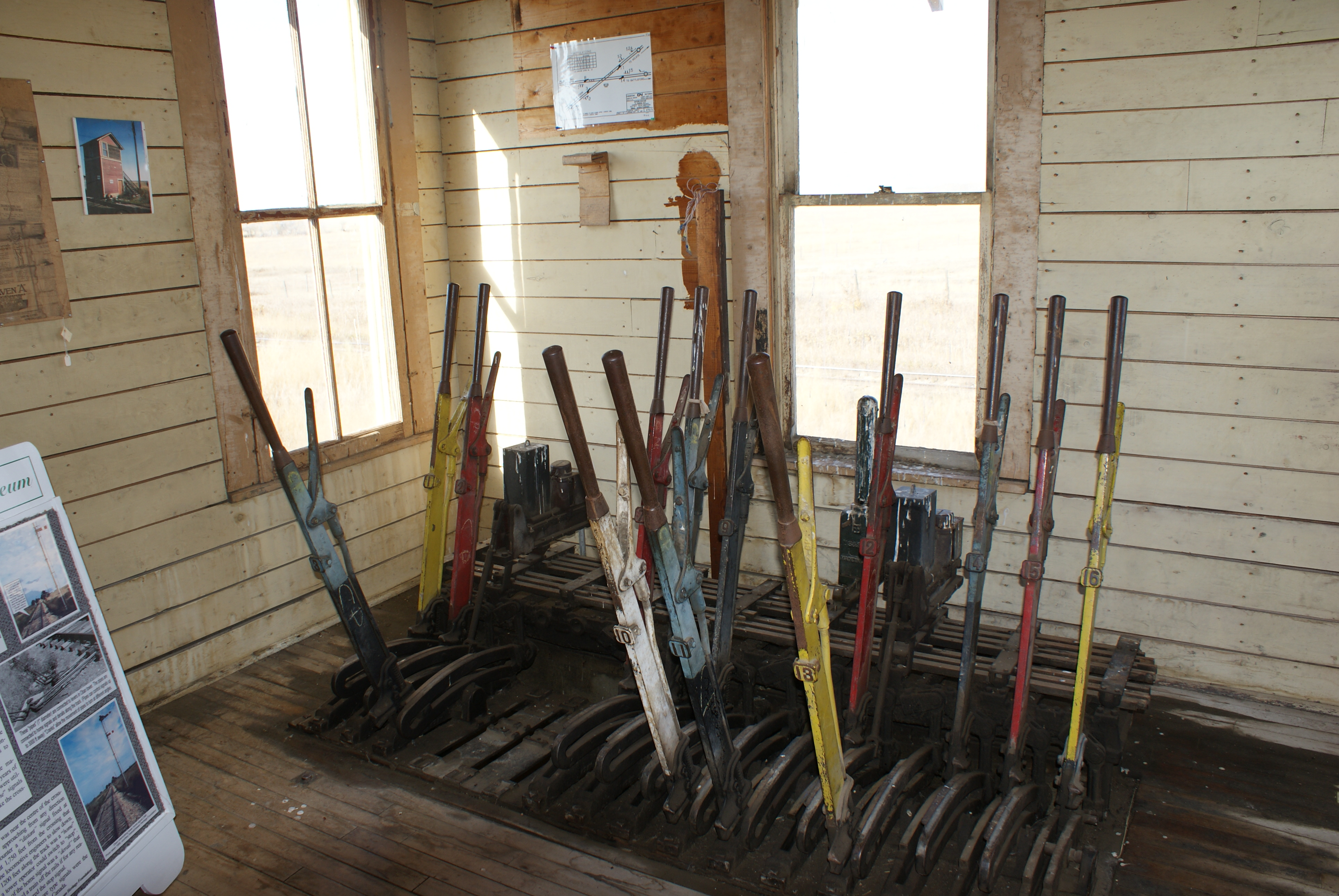
Sask Railway museum

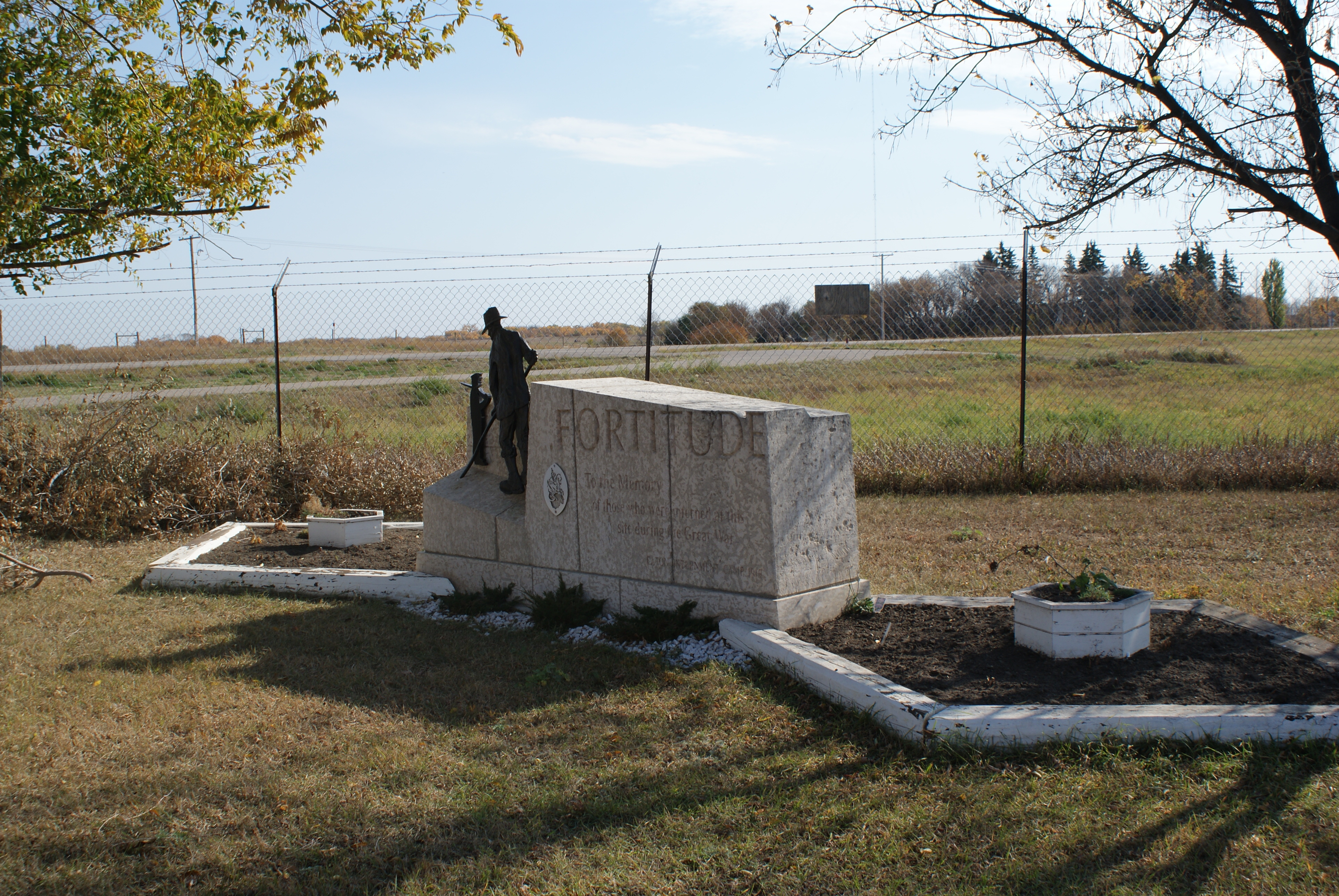
Sask Railway museum

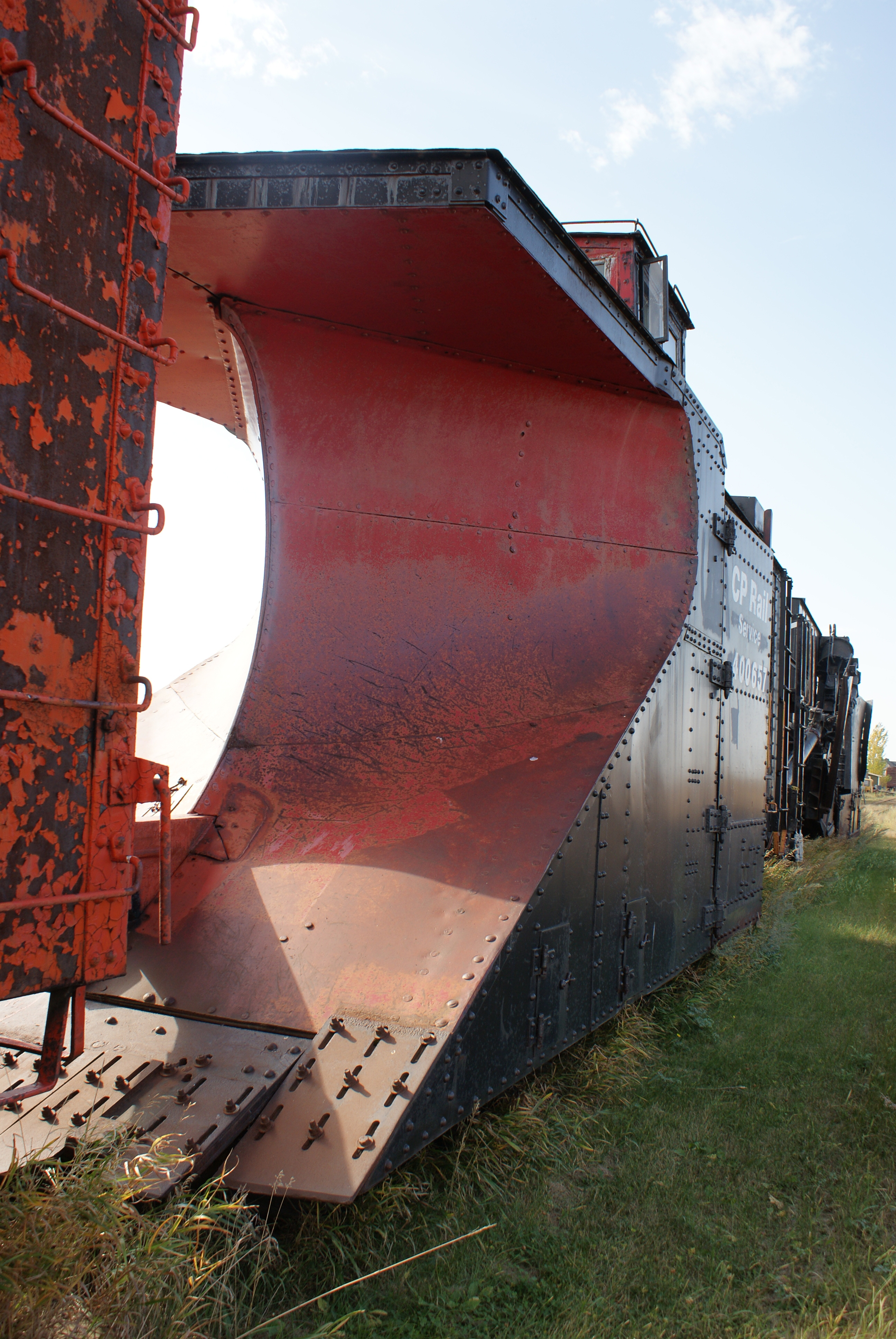
Sask Railway museum

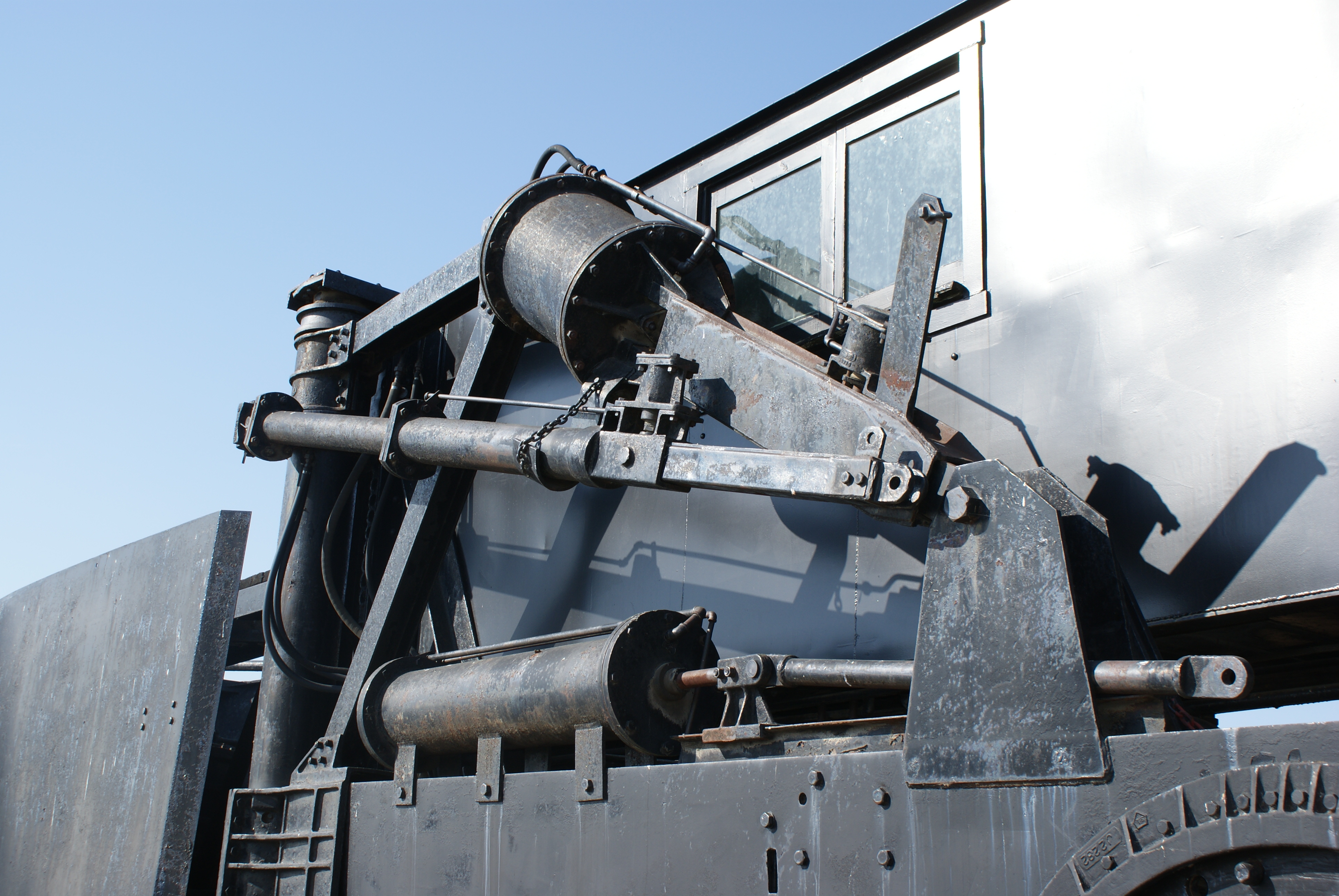
Sask Railway museum

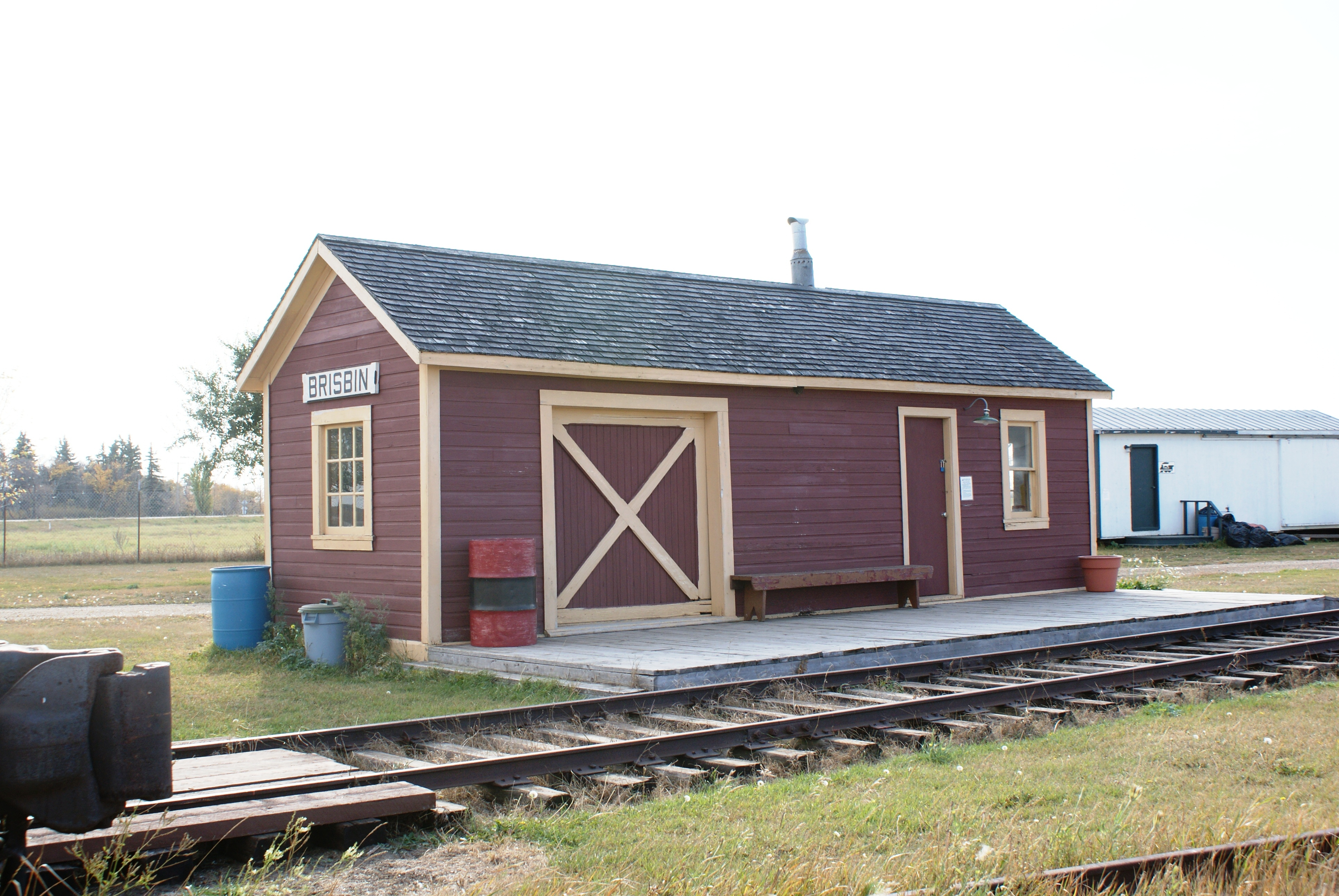
Sask Railway museum

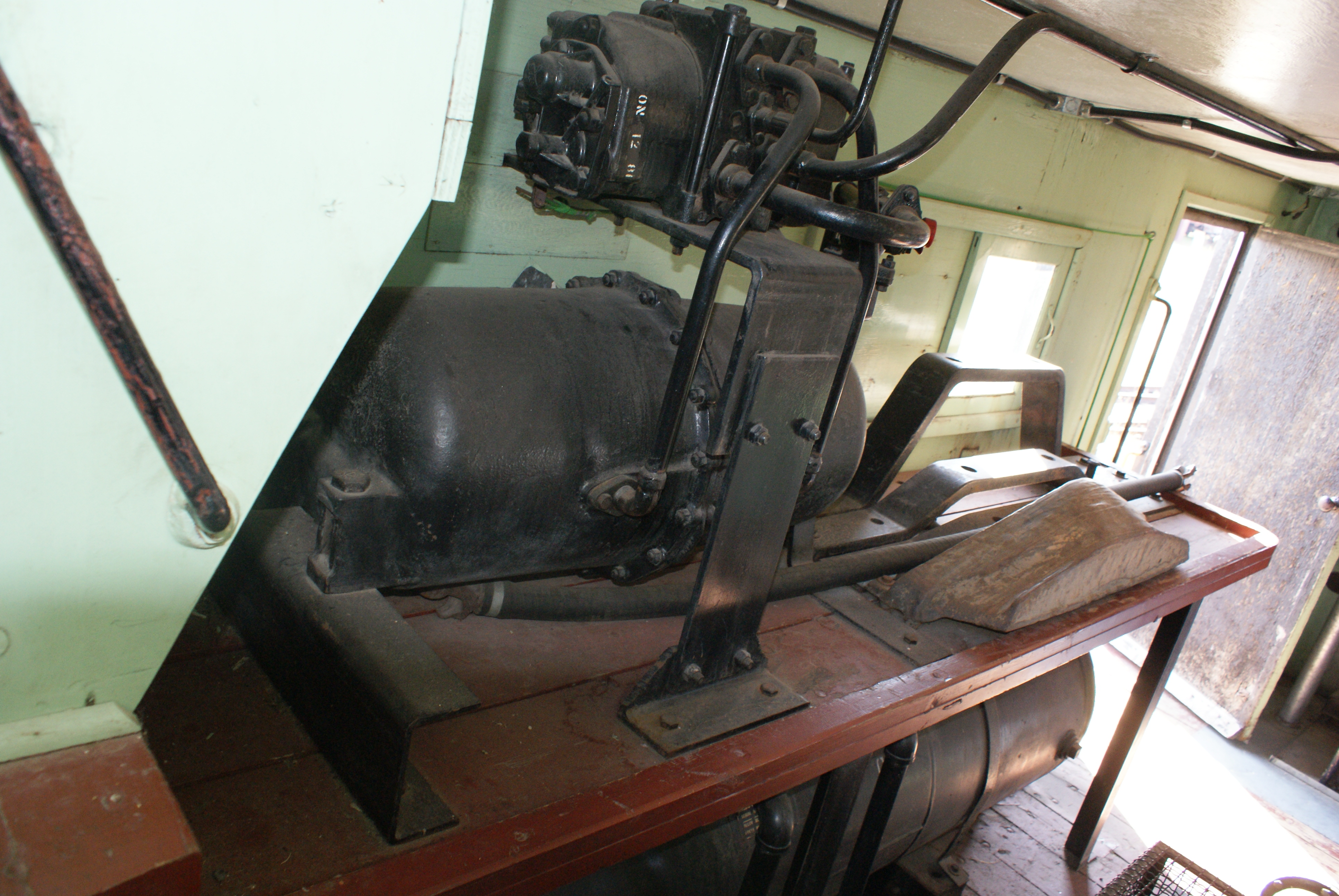
Sask Railway museum

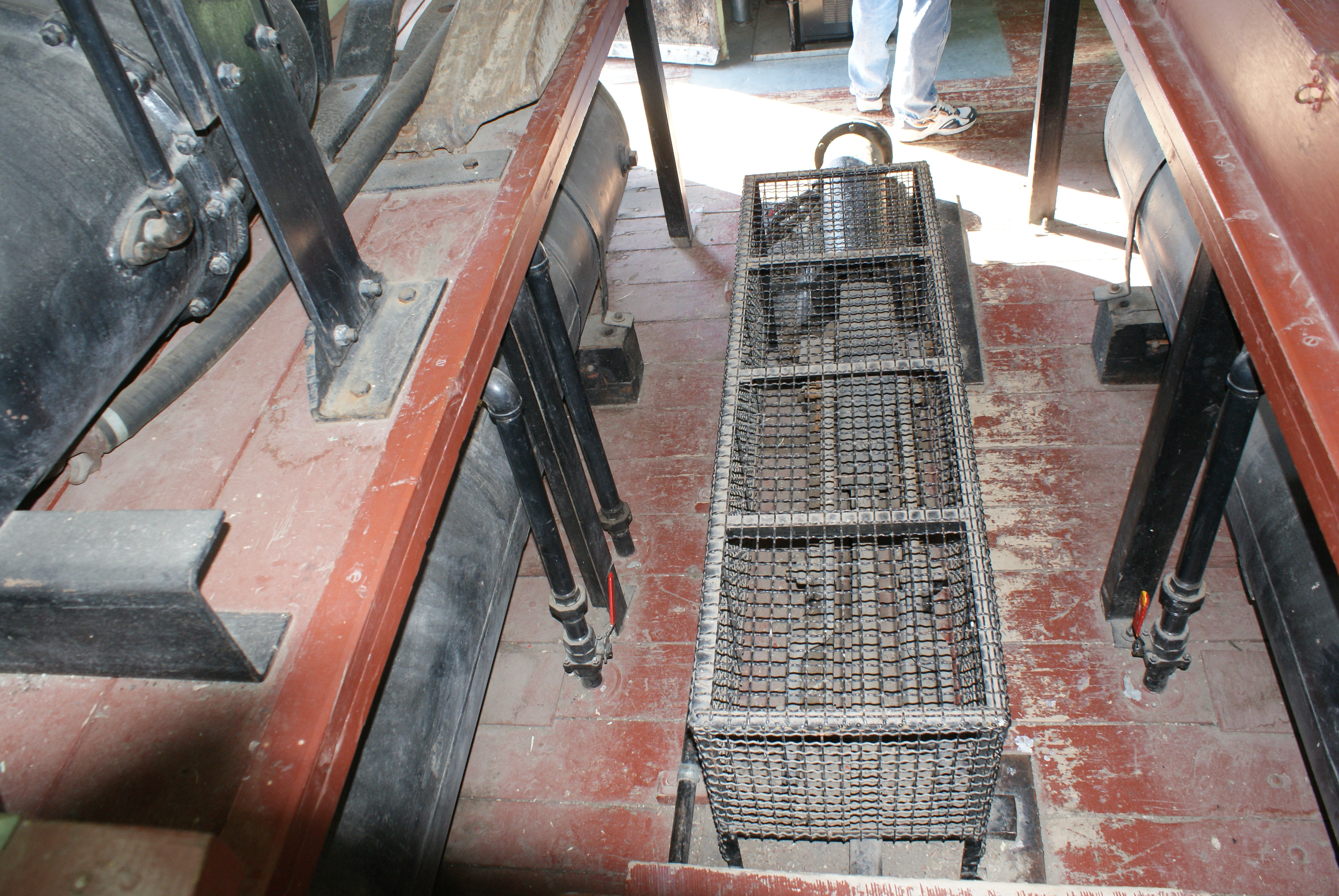
Sask Railway museum

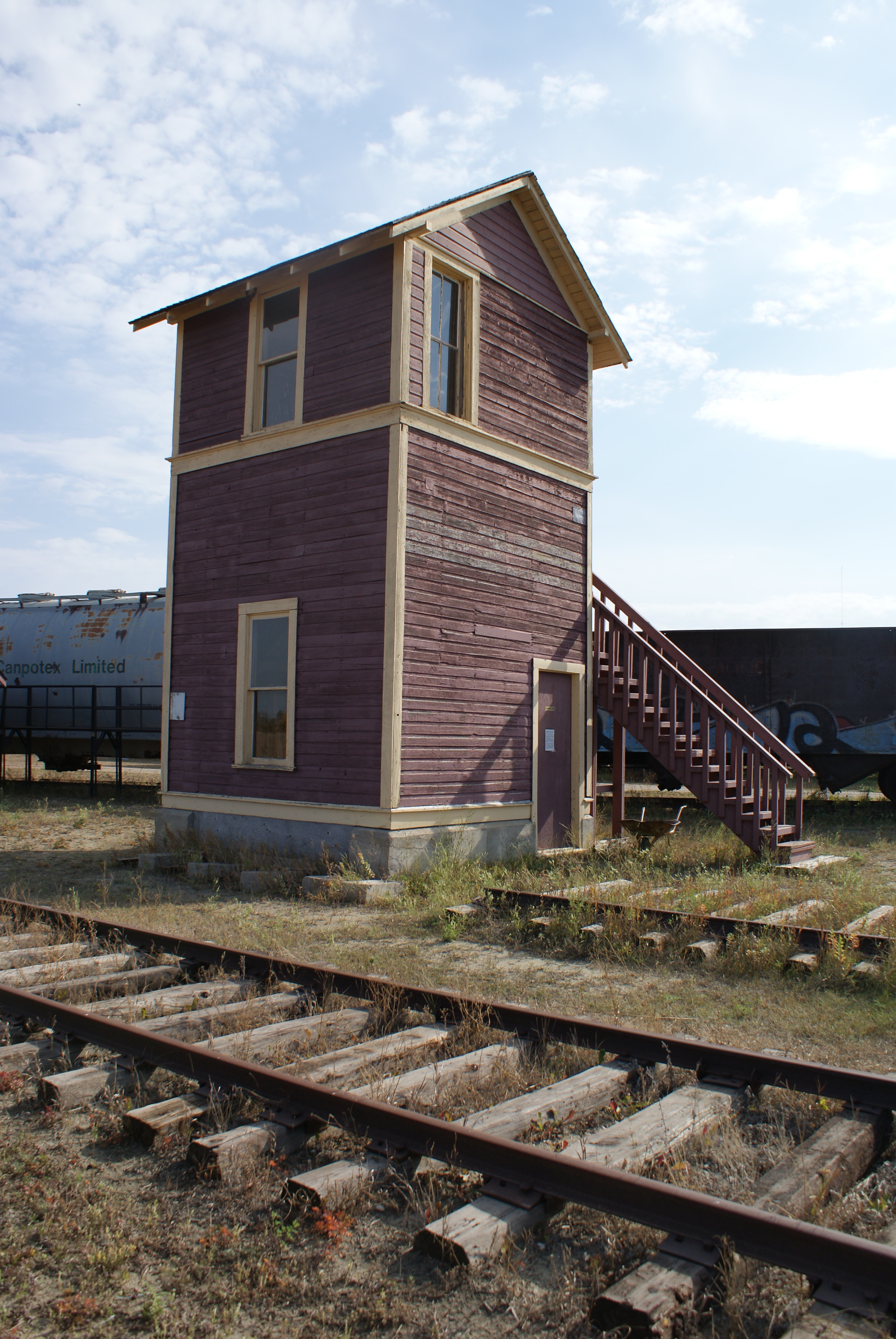
Sask Railway museum

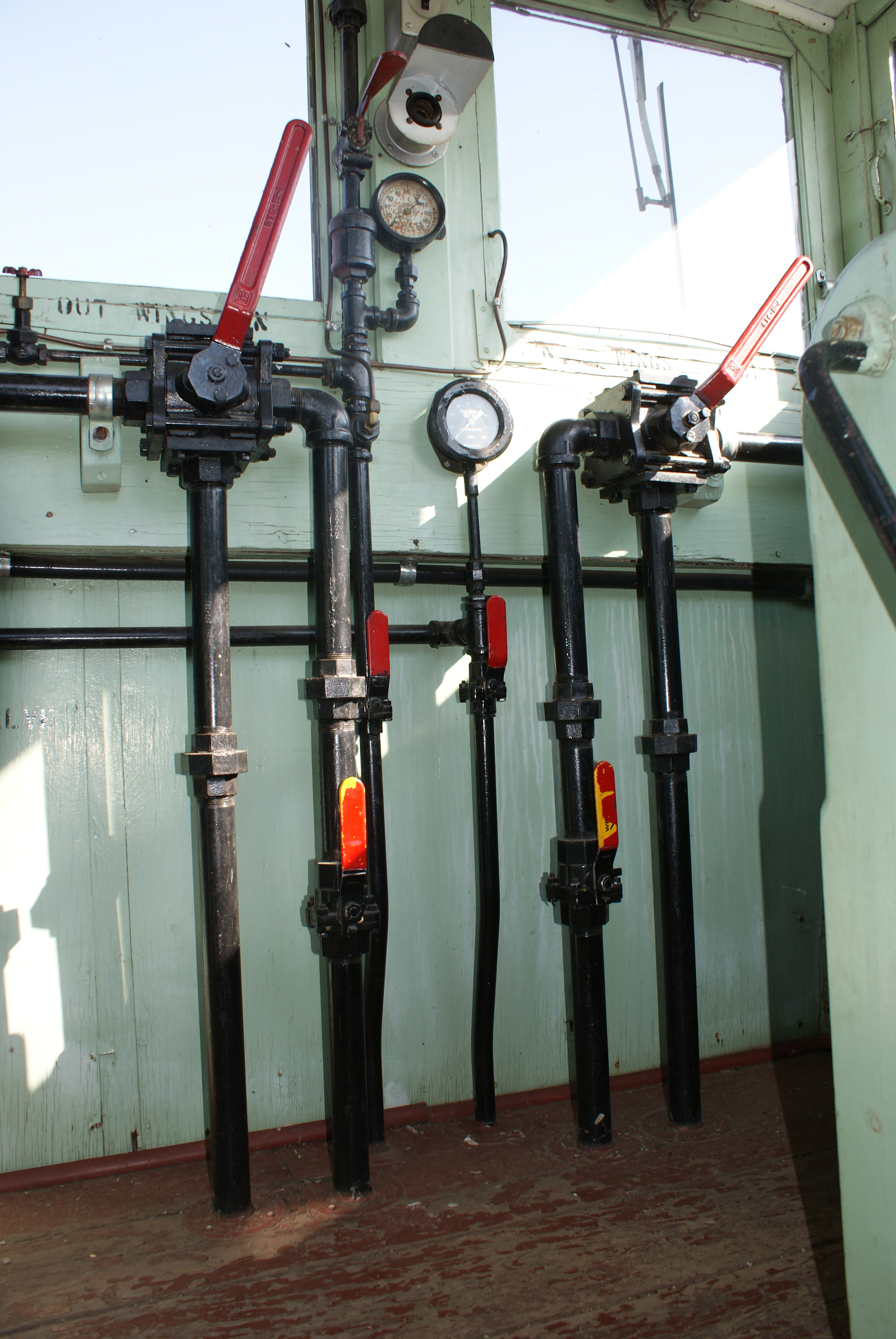
Sask Railway museum

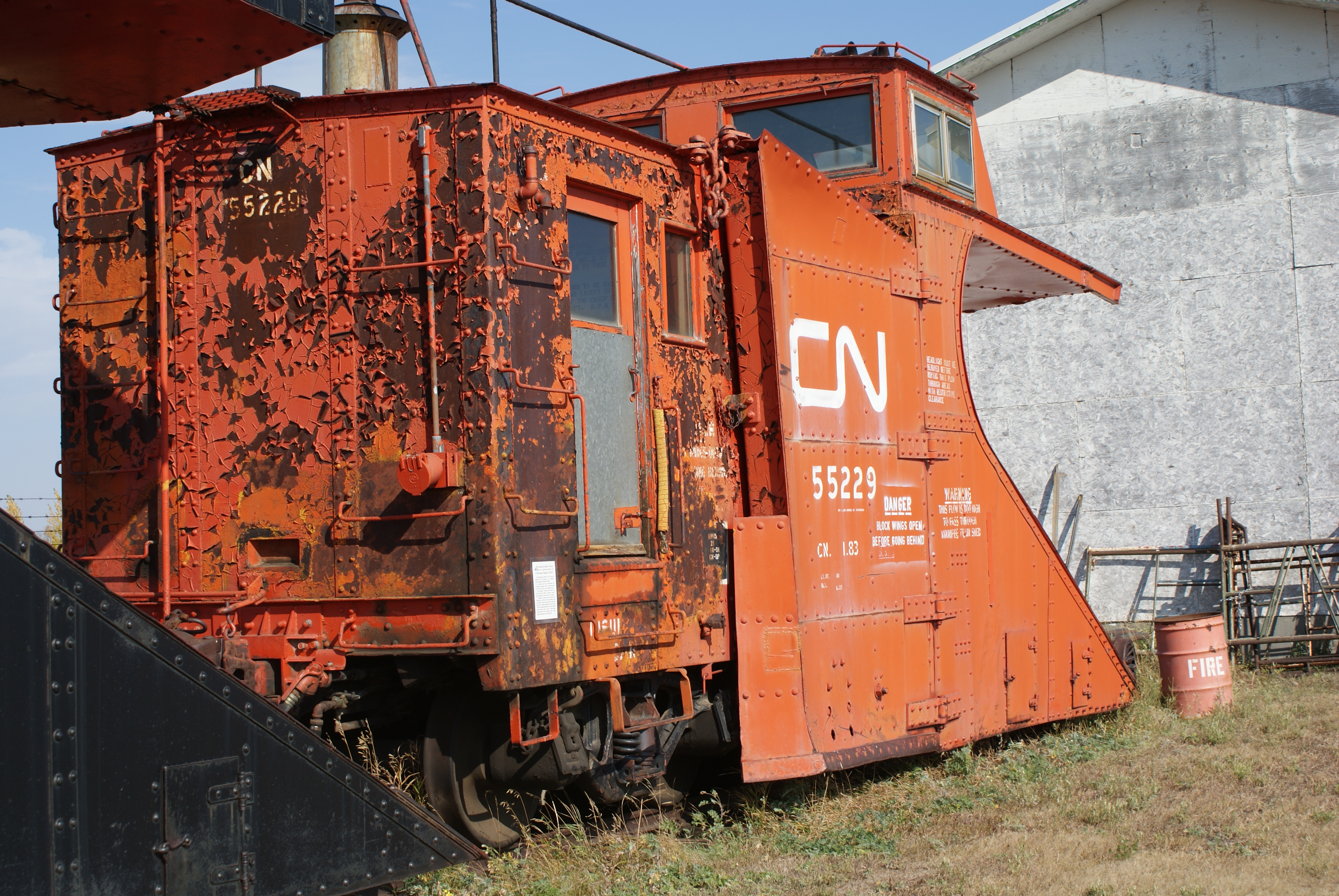
Sask Railway museum

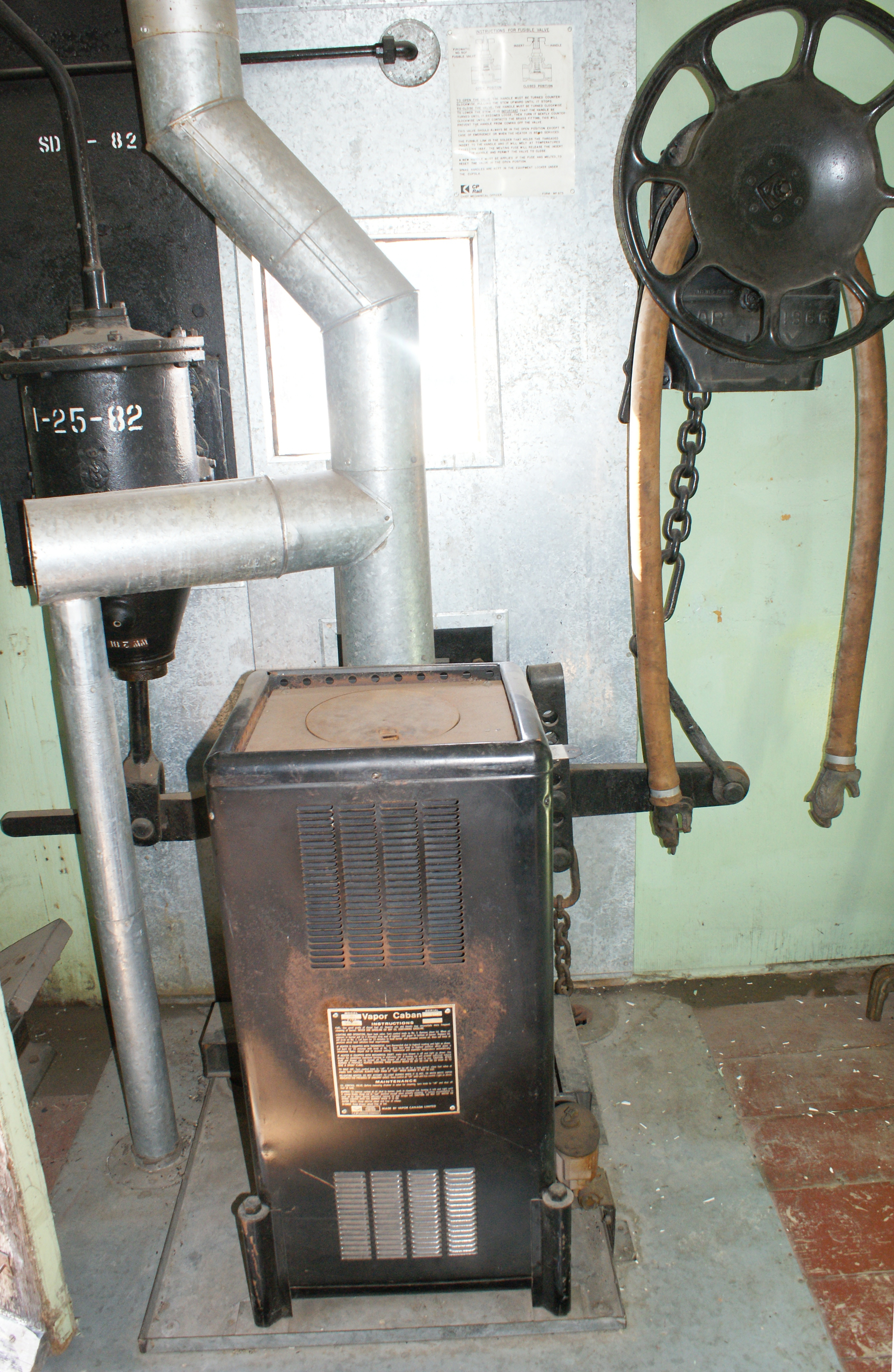
Sask Railway museum

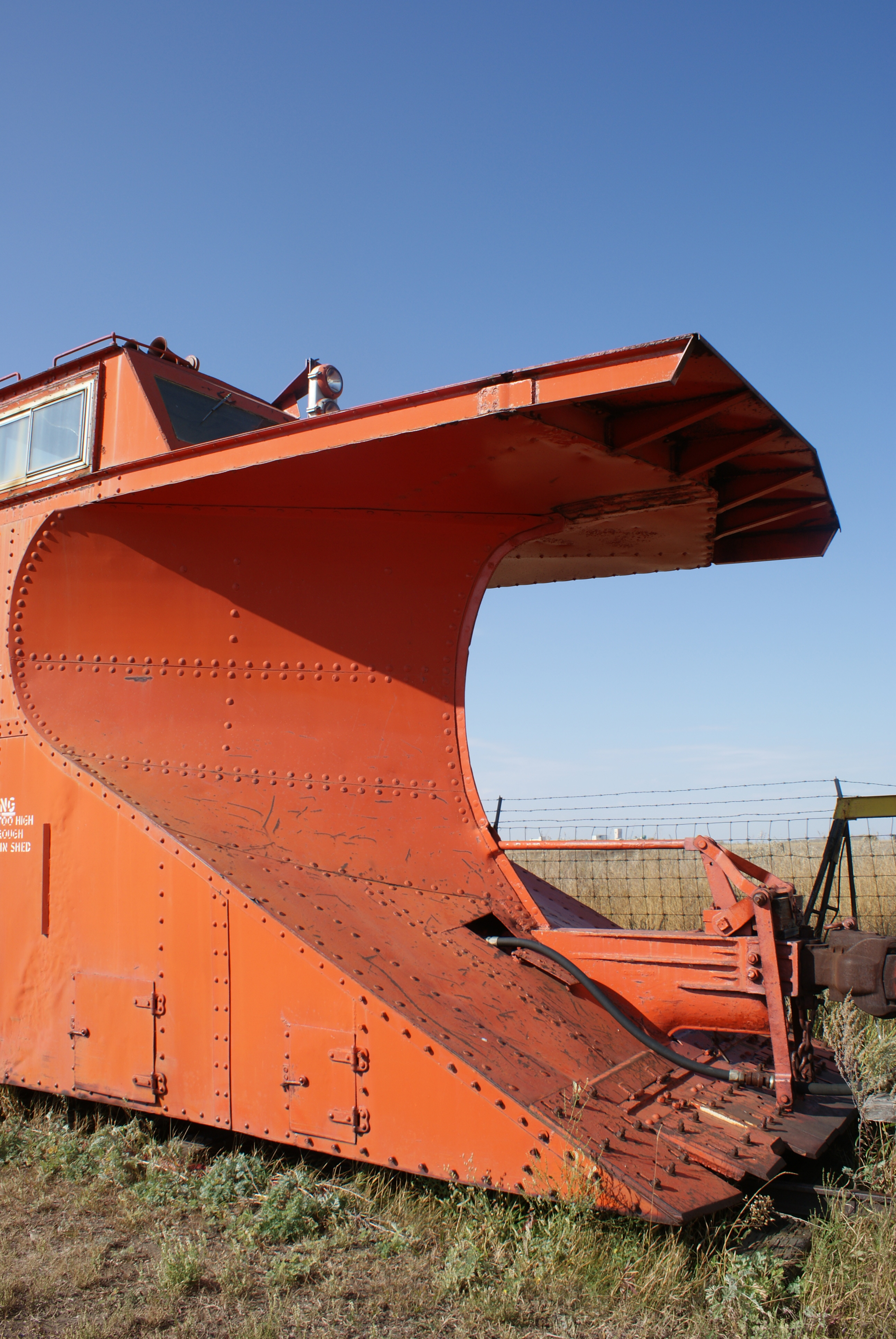
Sask Railway museum

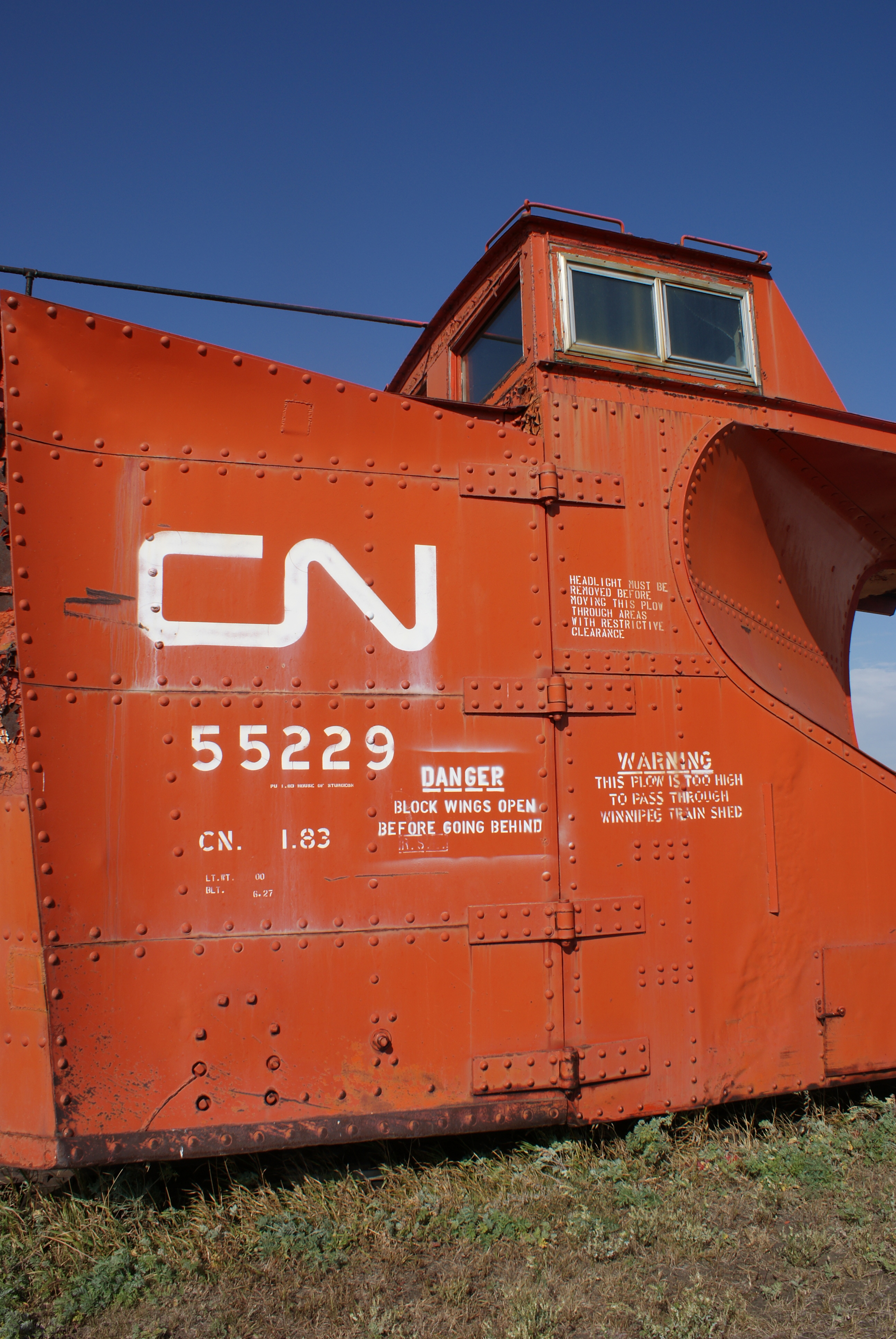
Sask Railway museum

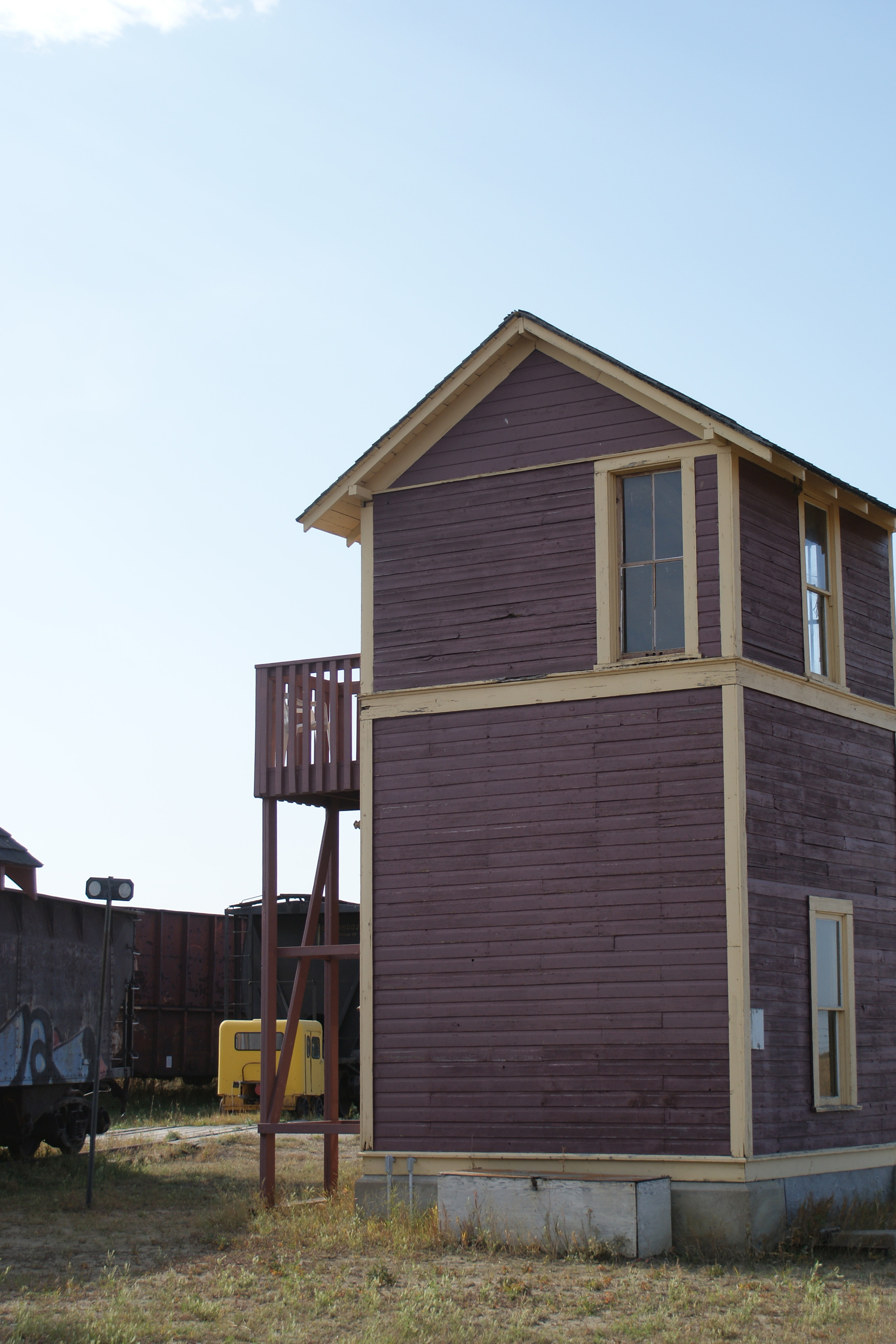
Sask Railway museum

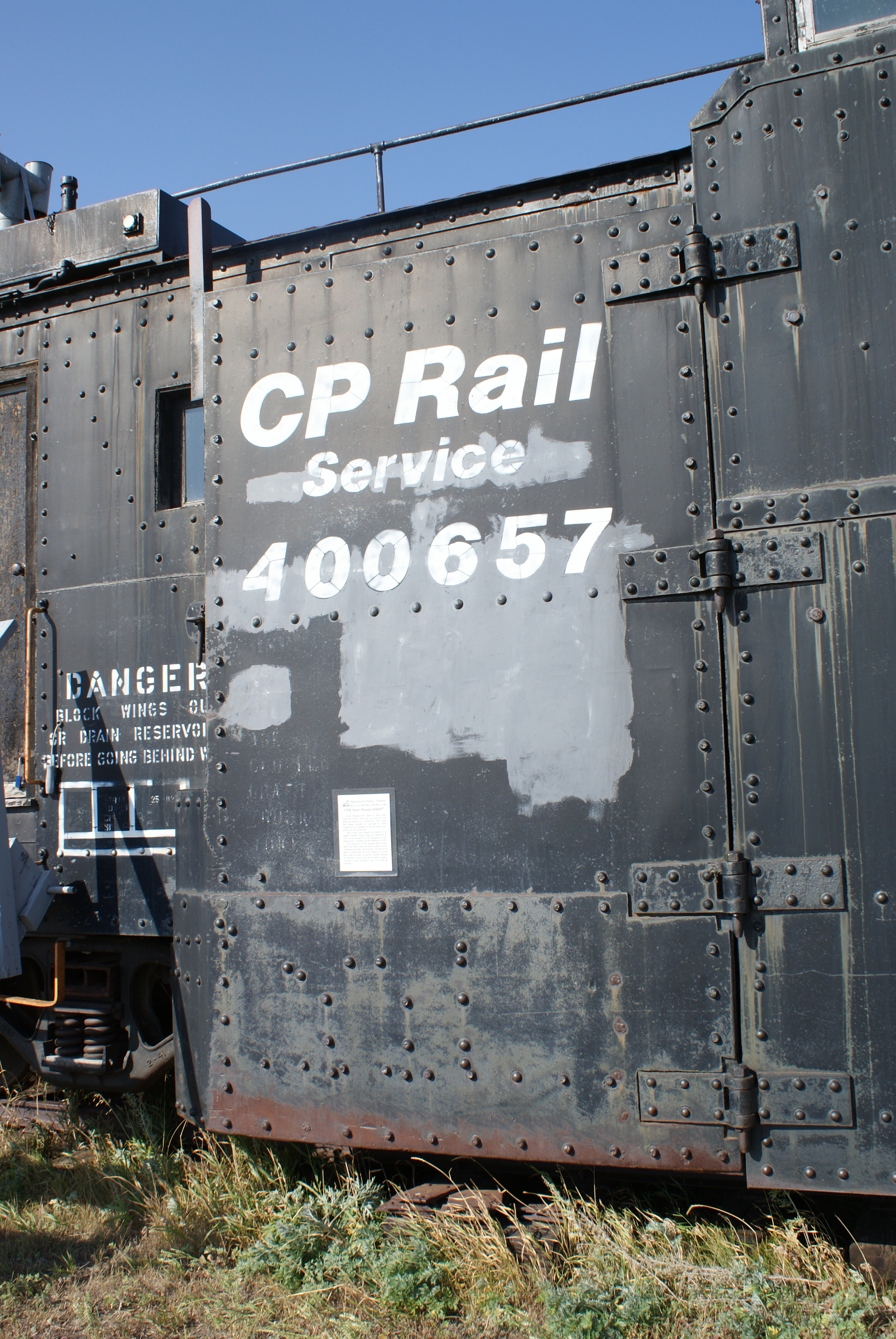
Sask Railway museum

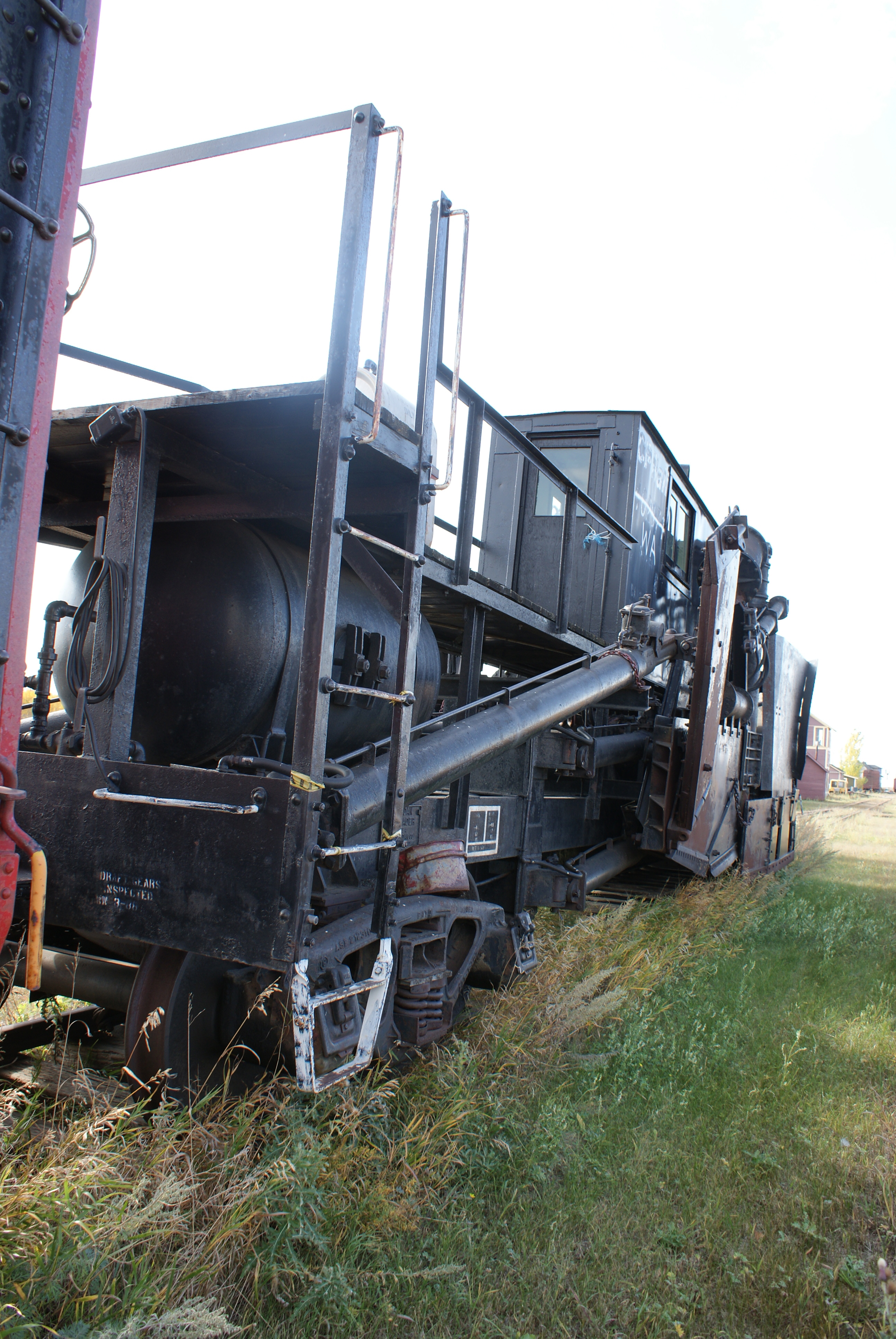
Sask Railway museum

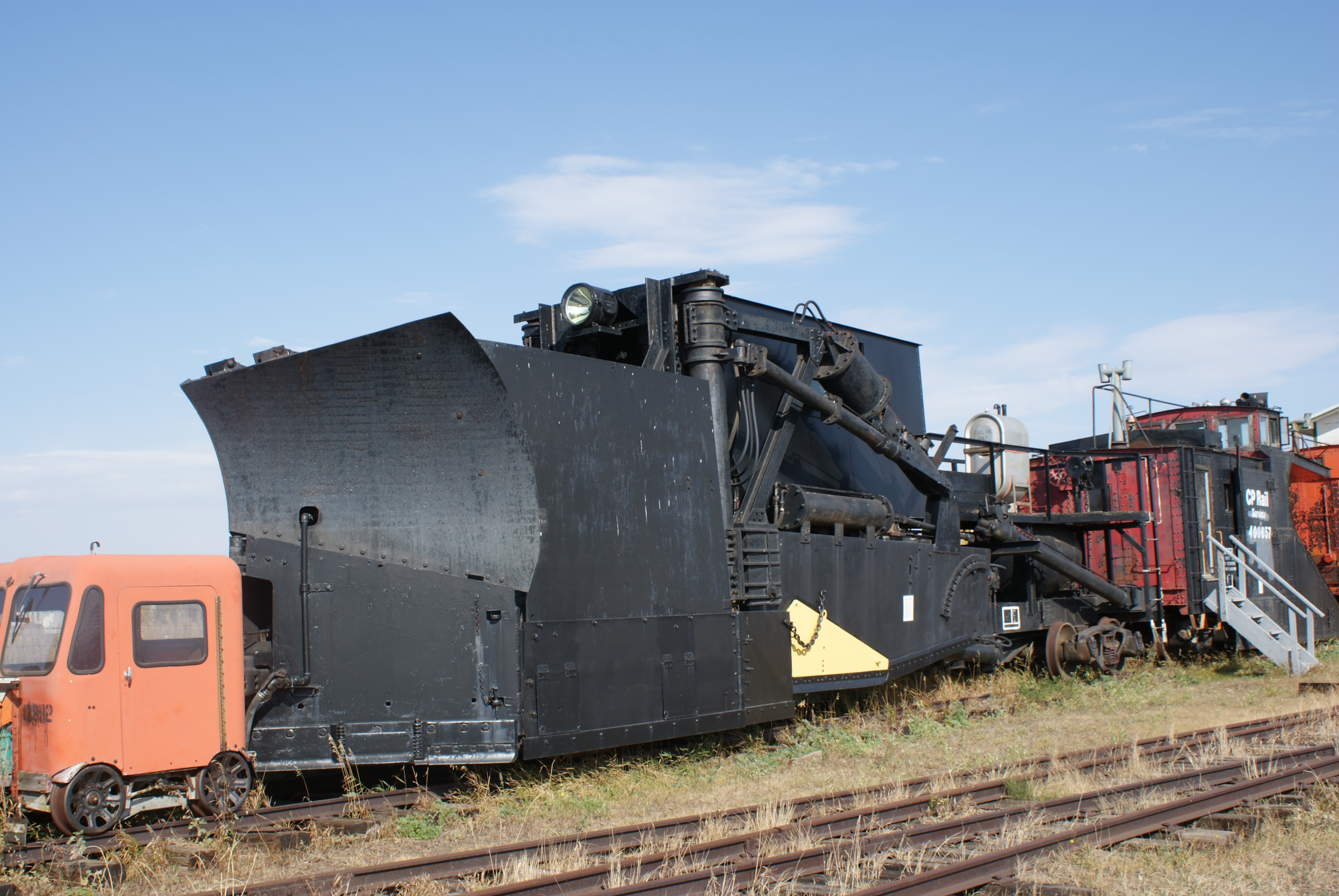
Sask Railway museum

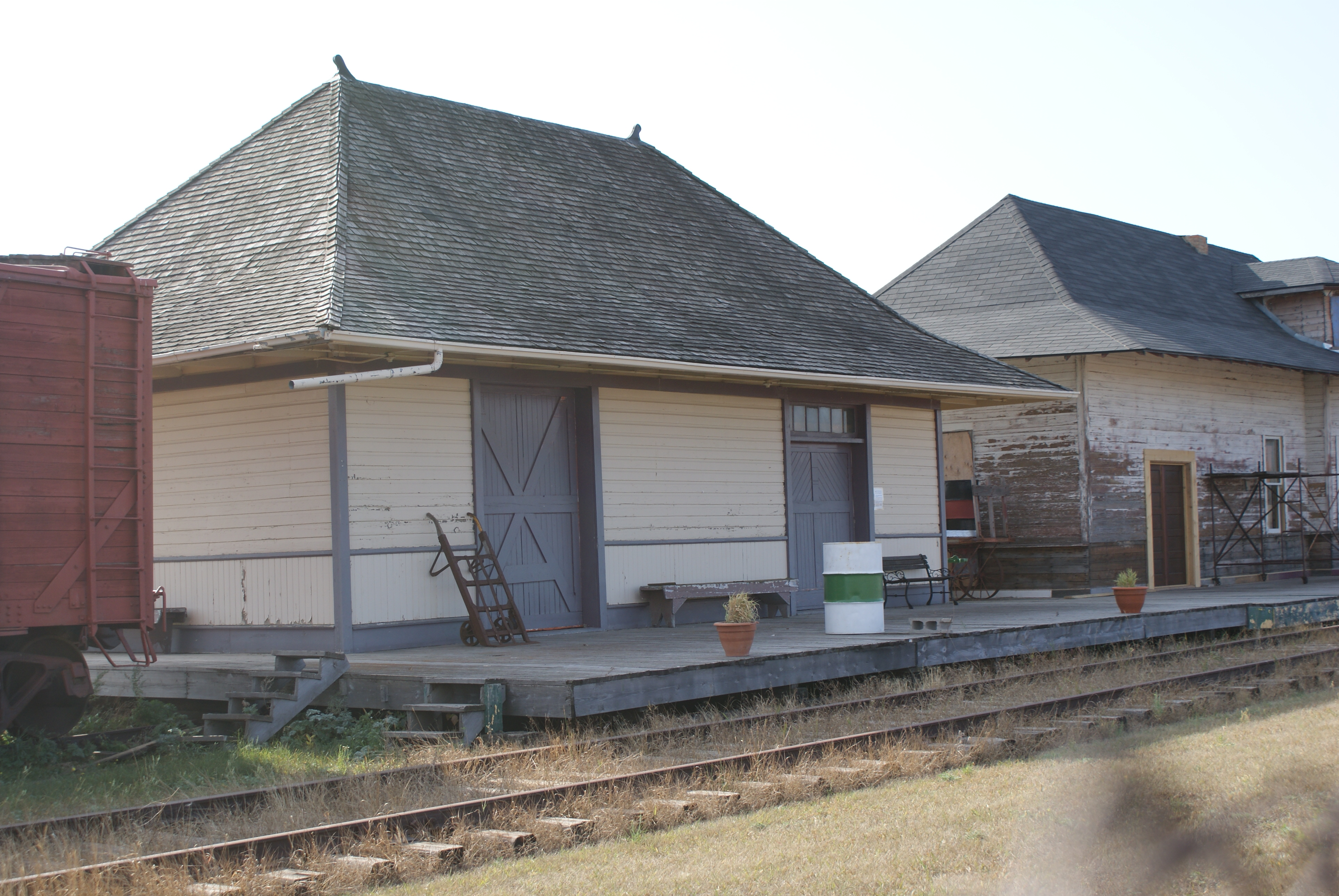
Sask Railway museum

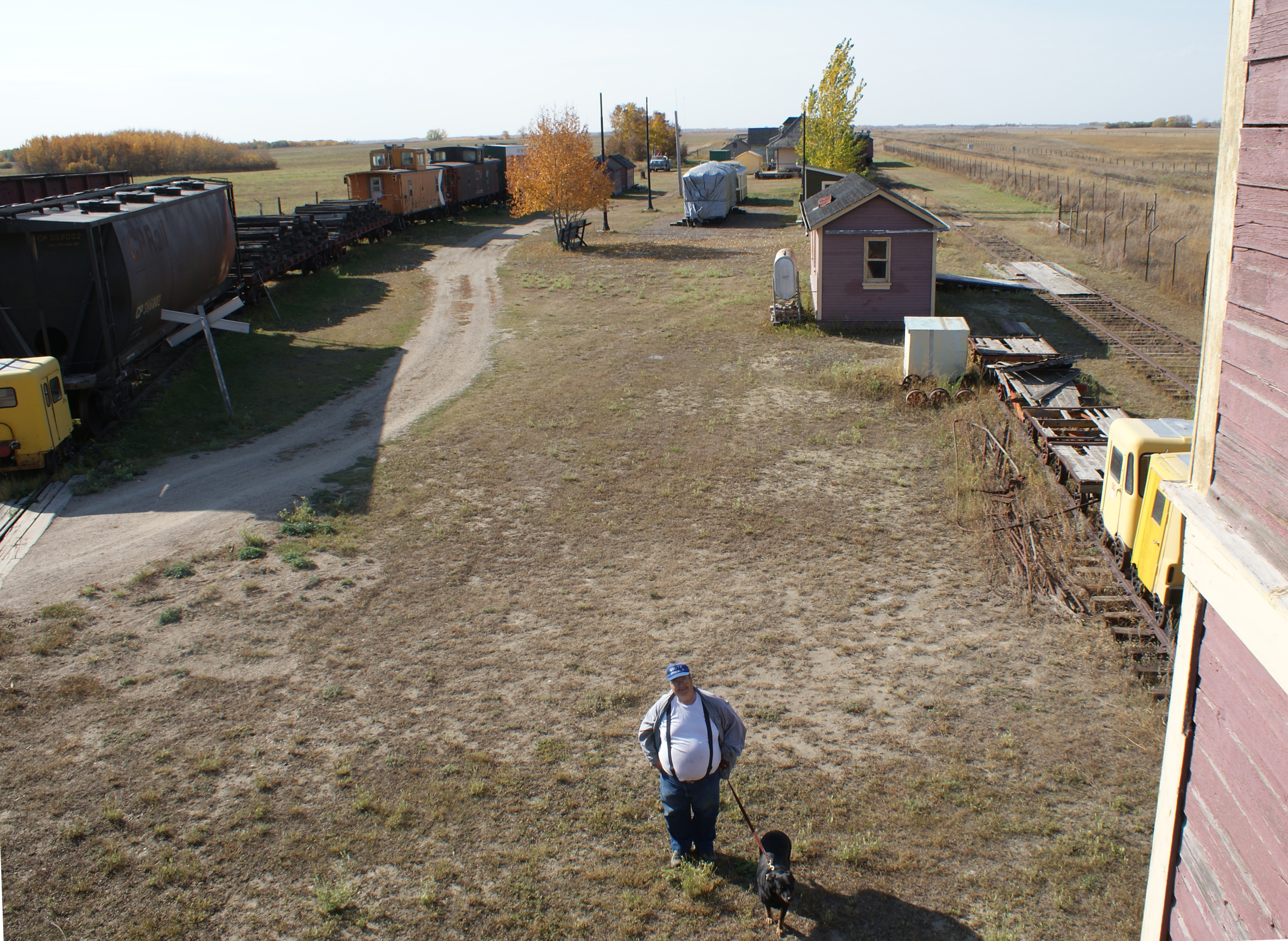
Sask Railway museum

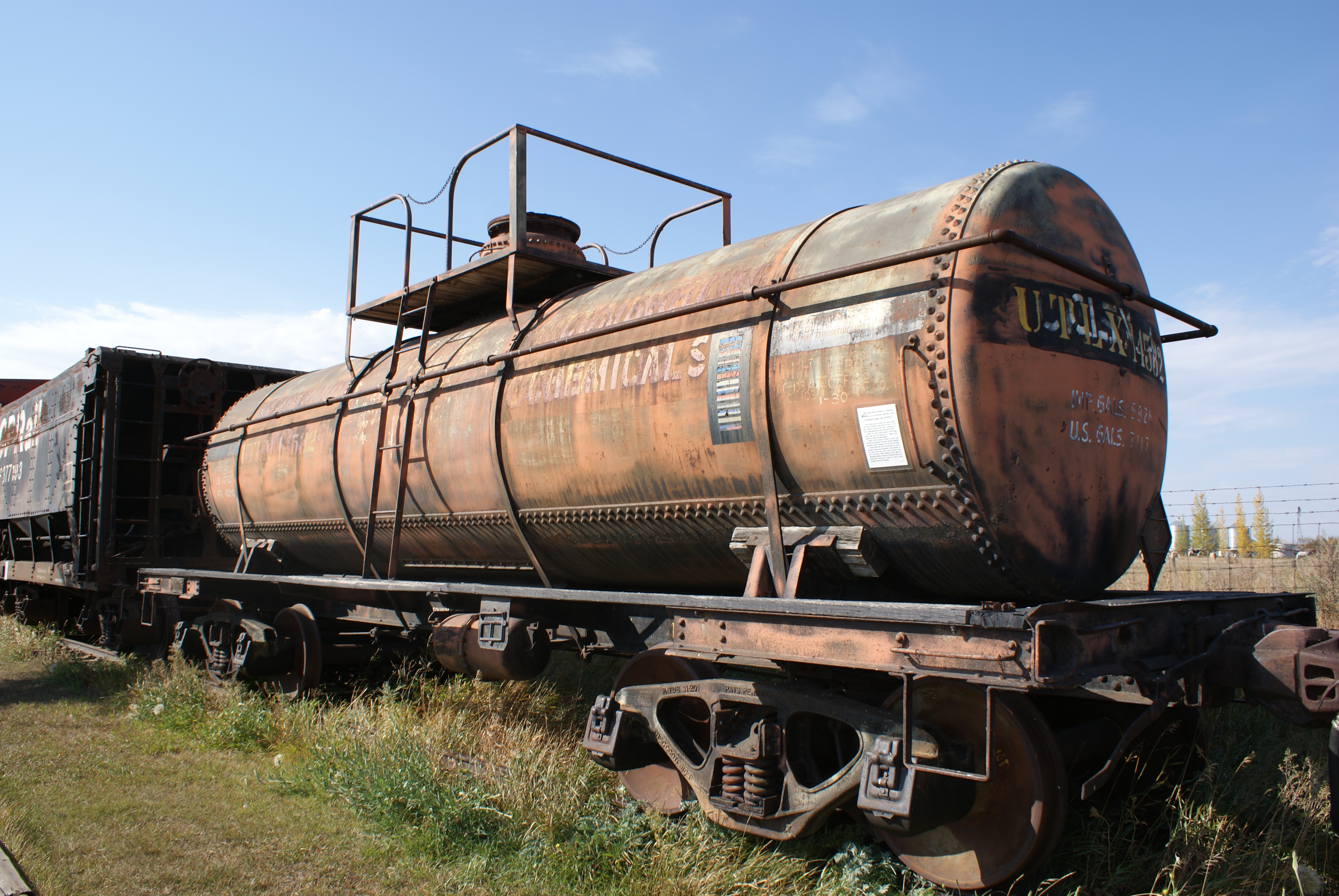
Sask Railway museum

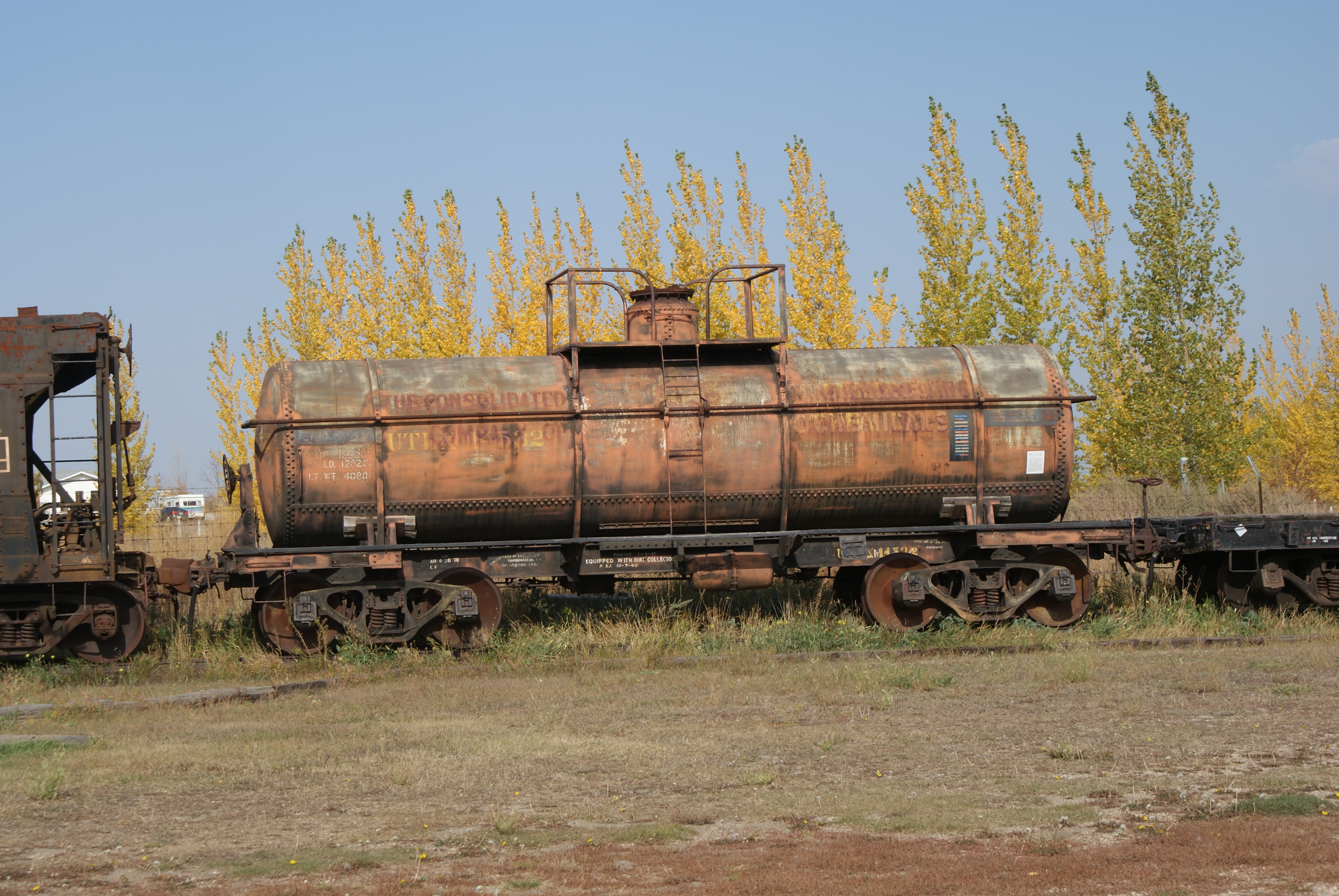
Sask Railway museum

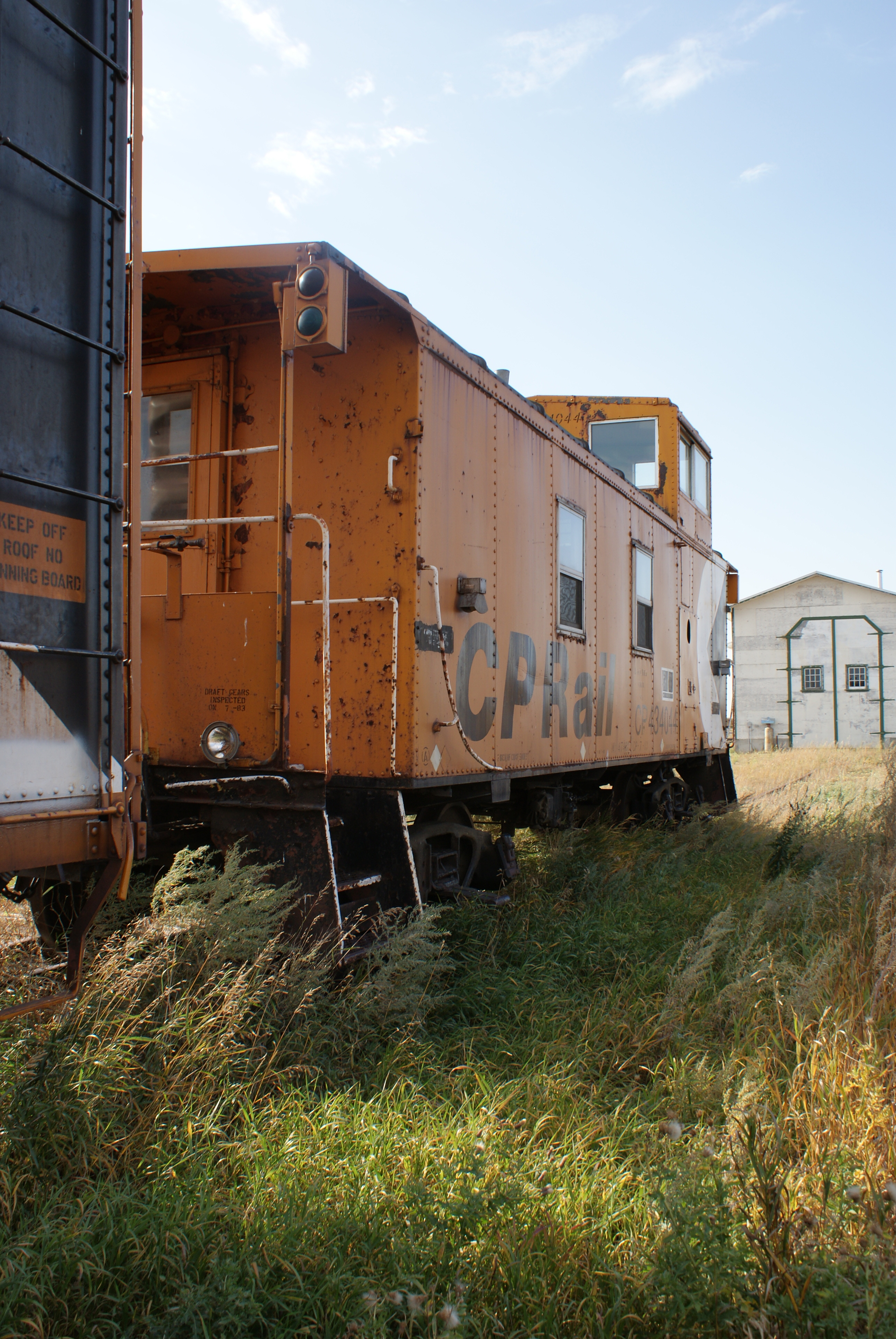
Sask Railway museum

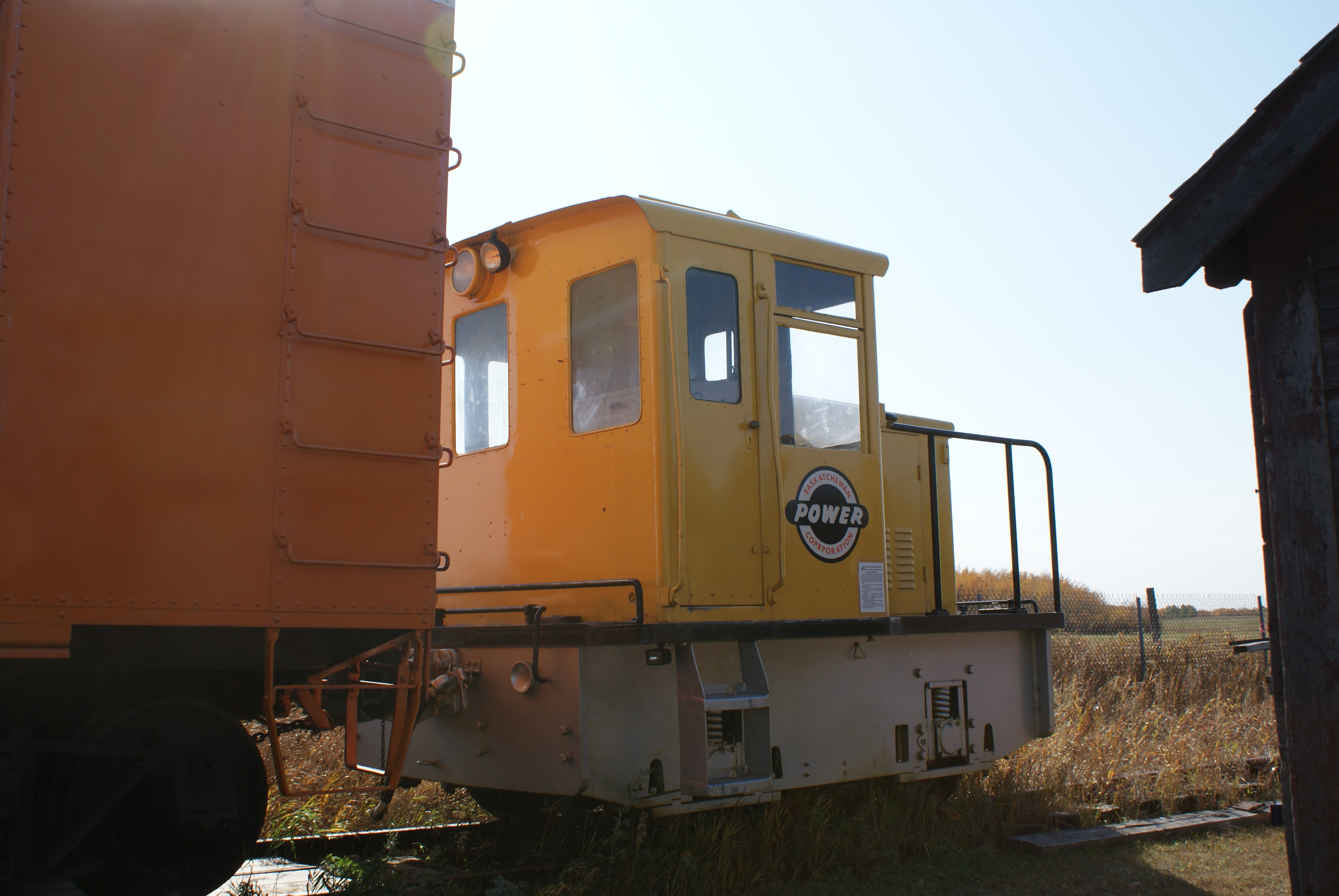
Sask Railway museum

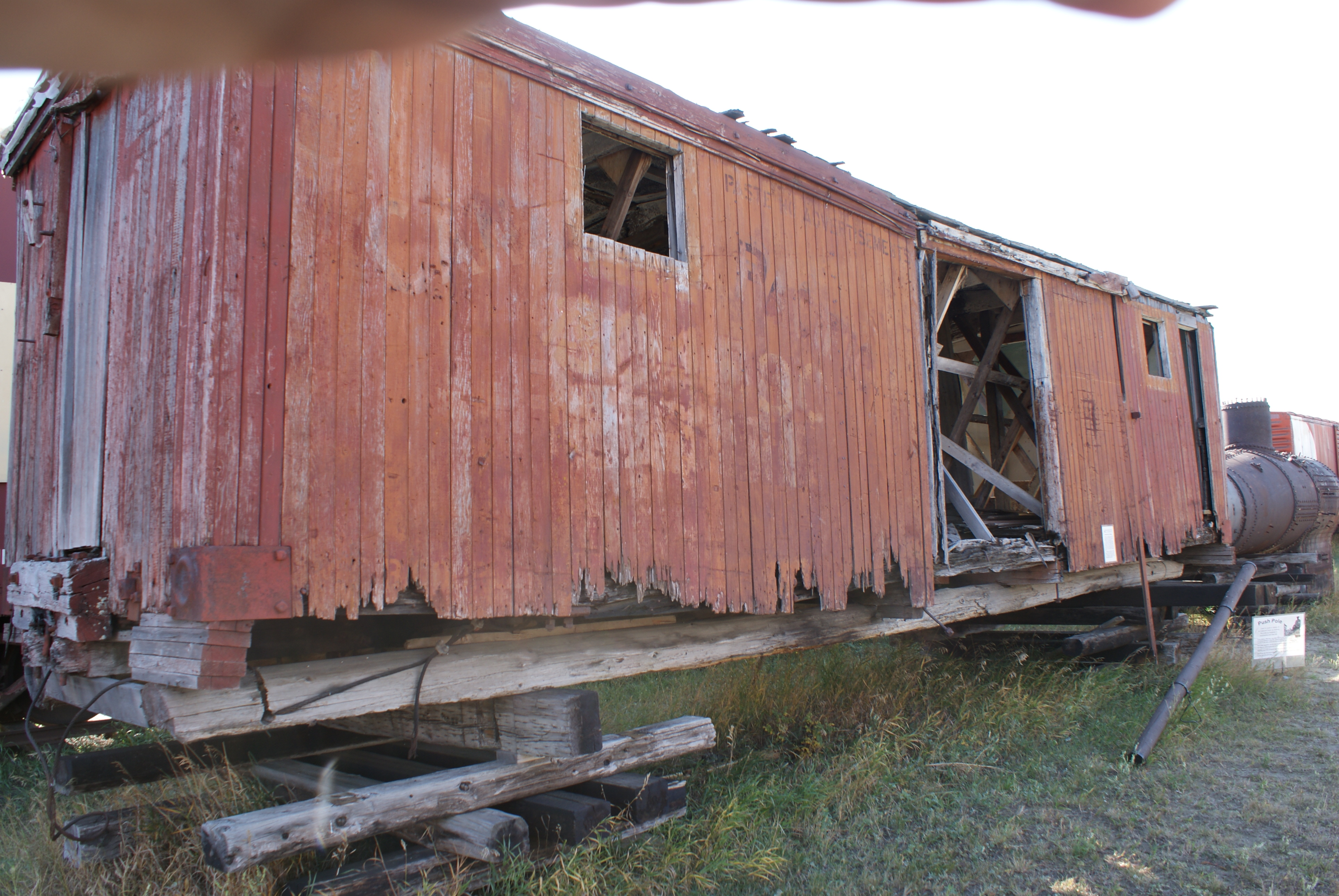
Sask Railway museum

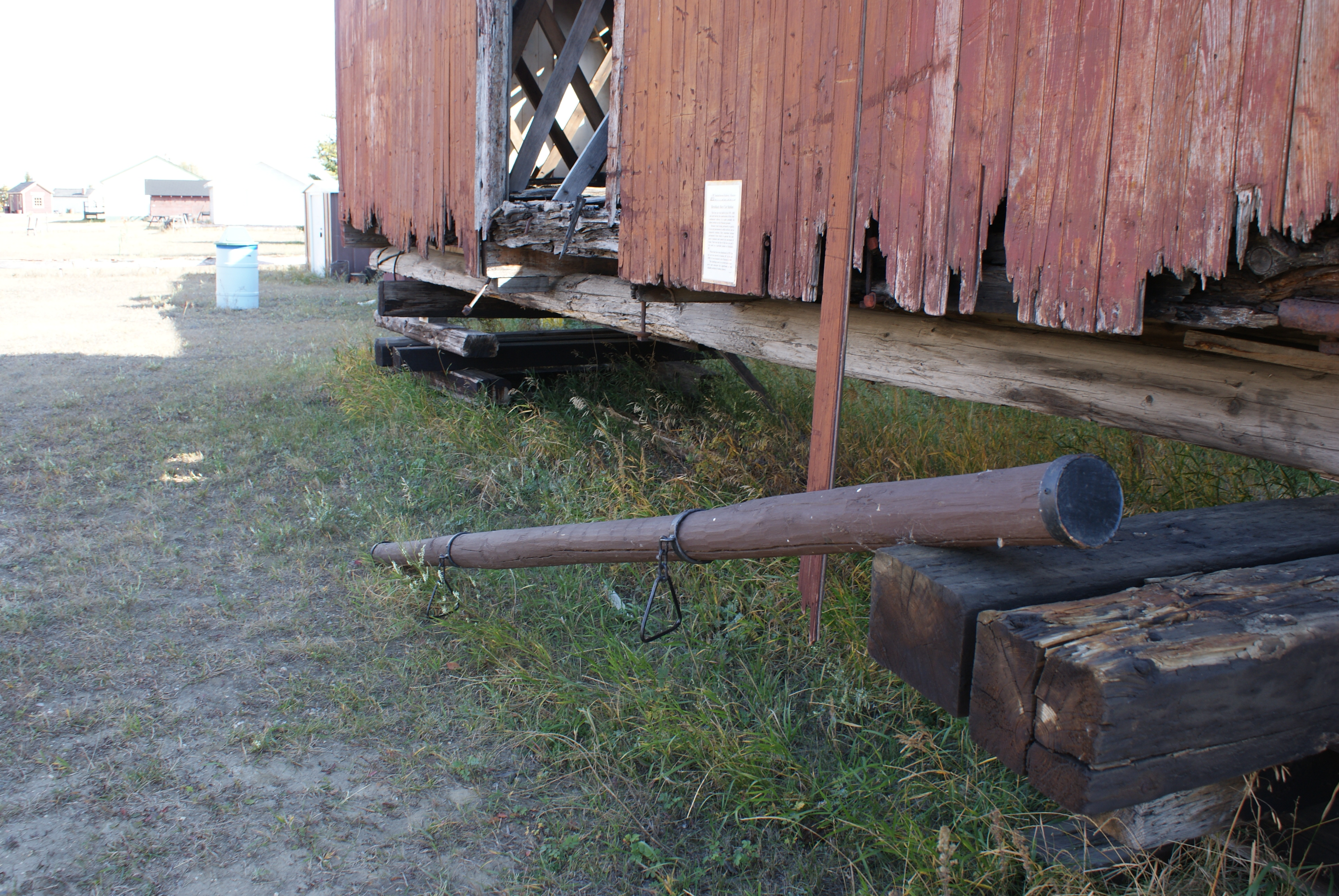
Sask Railway museum

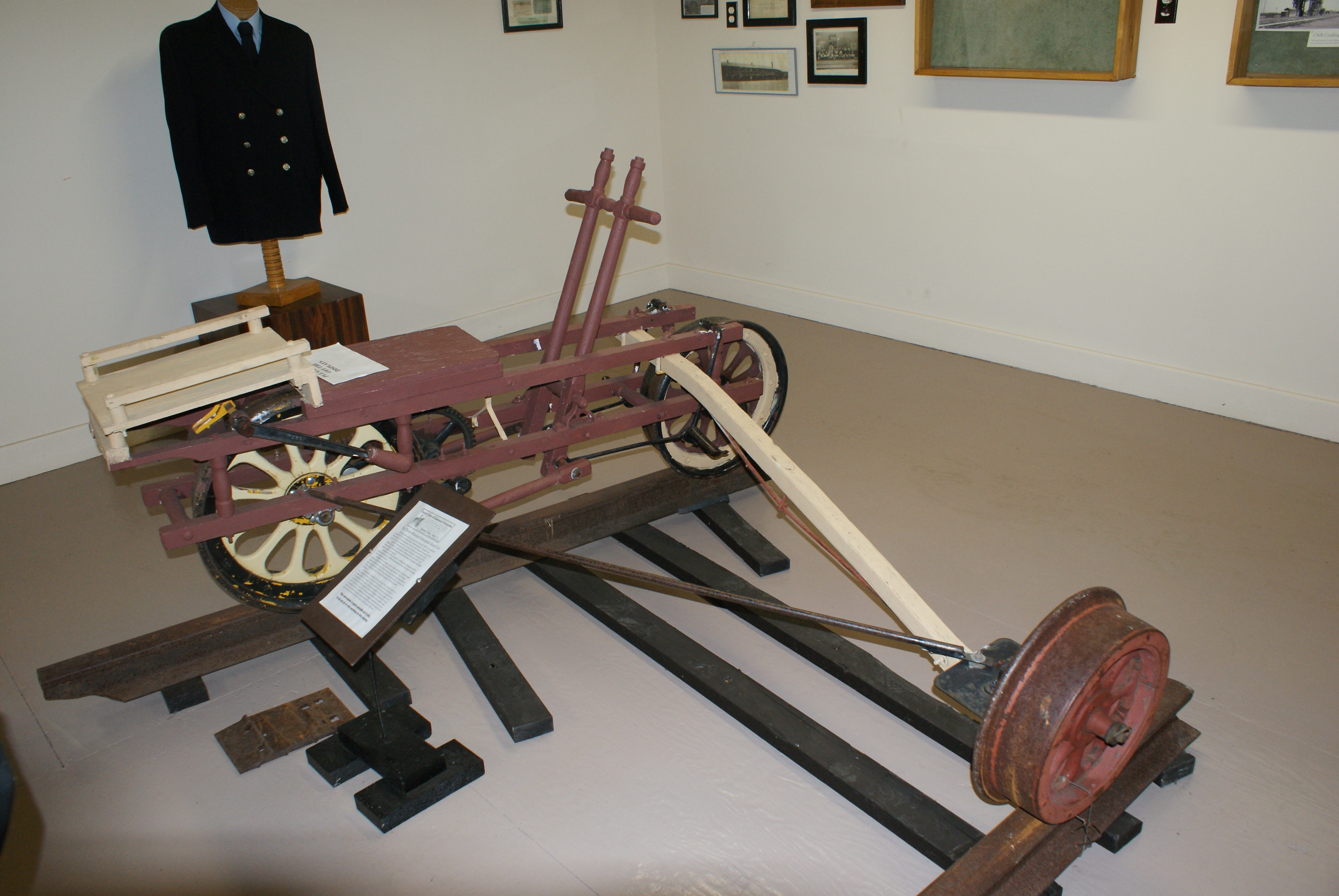
Sask Railway museum

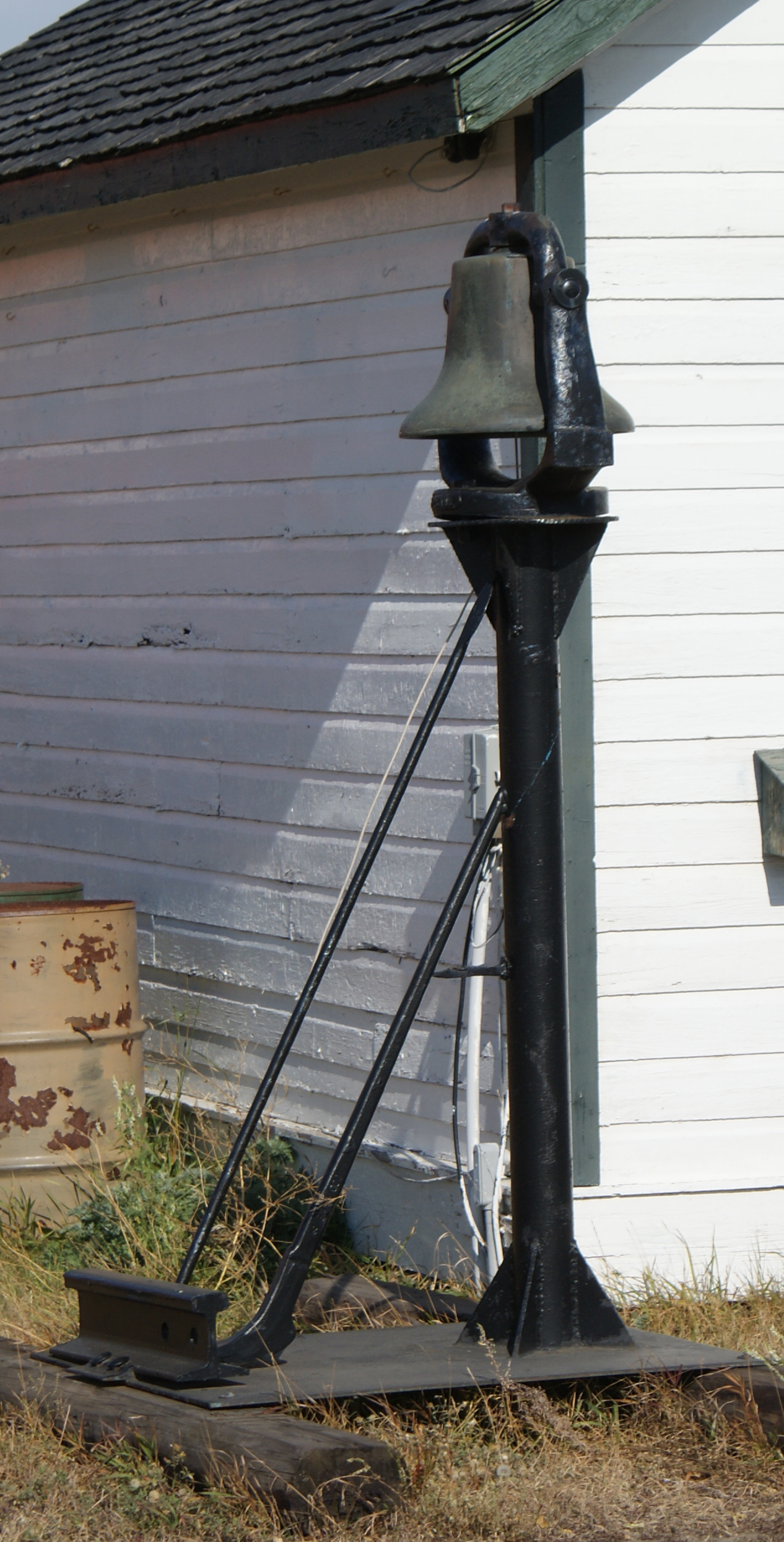
Sask Railway museum

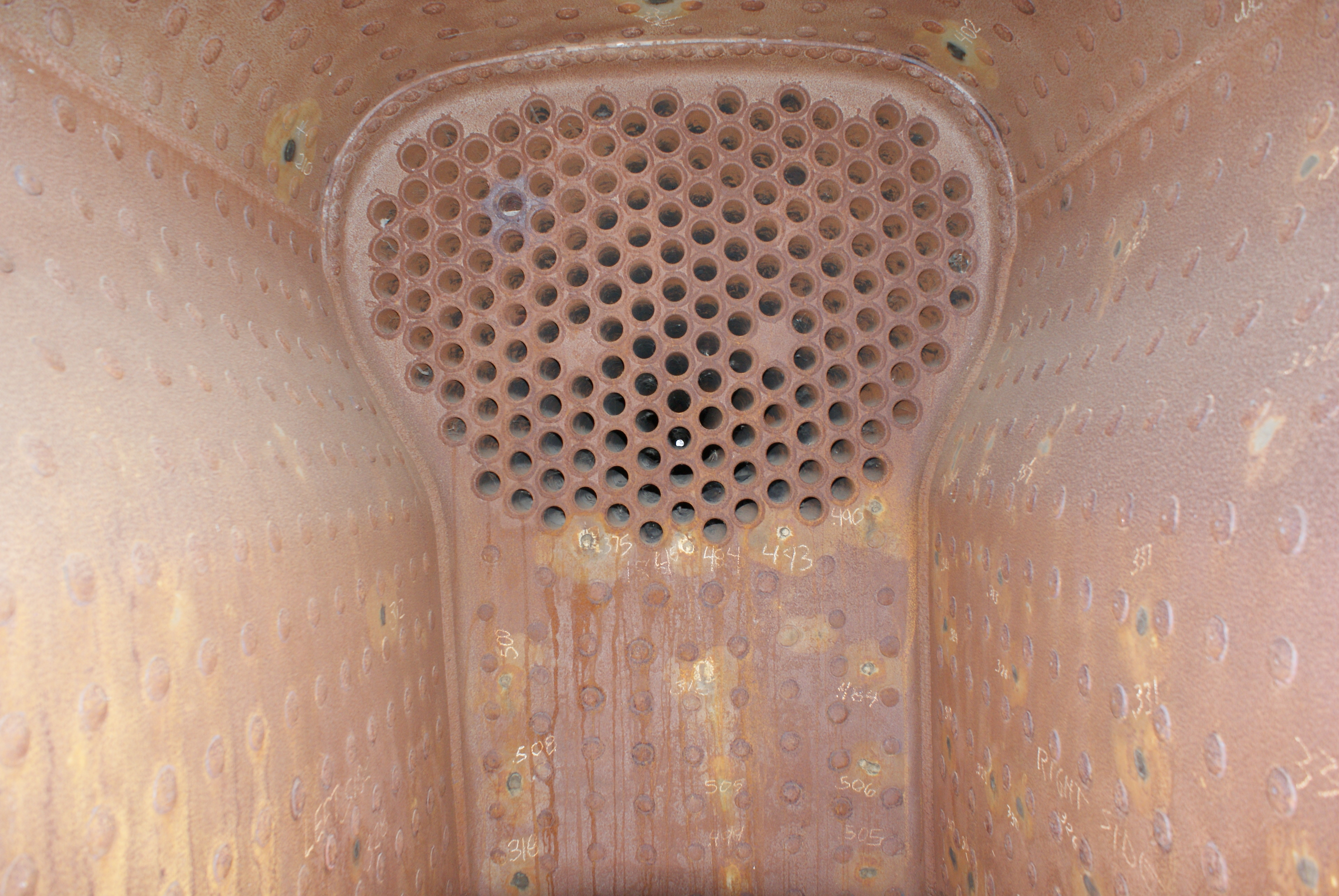
Sask Railway museum

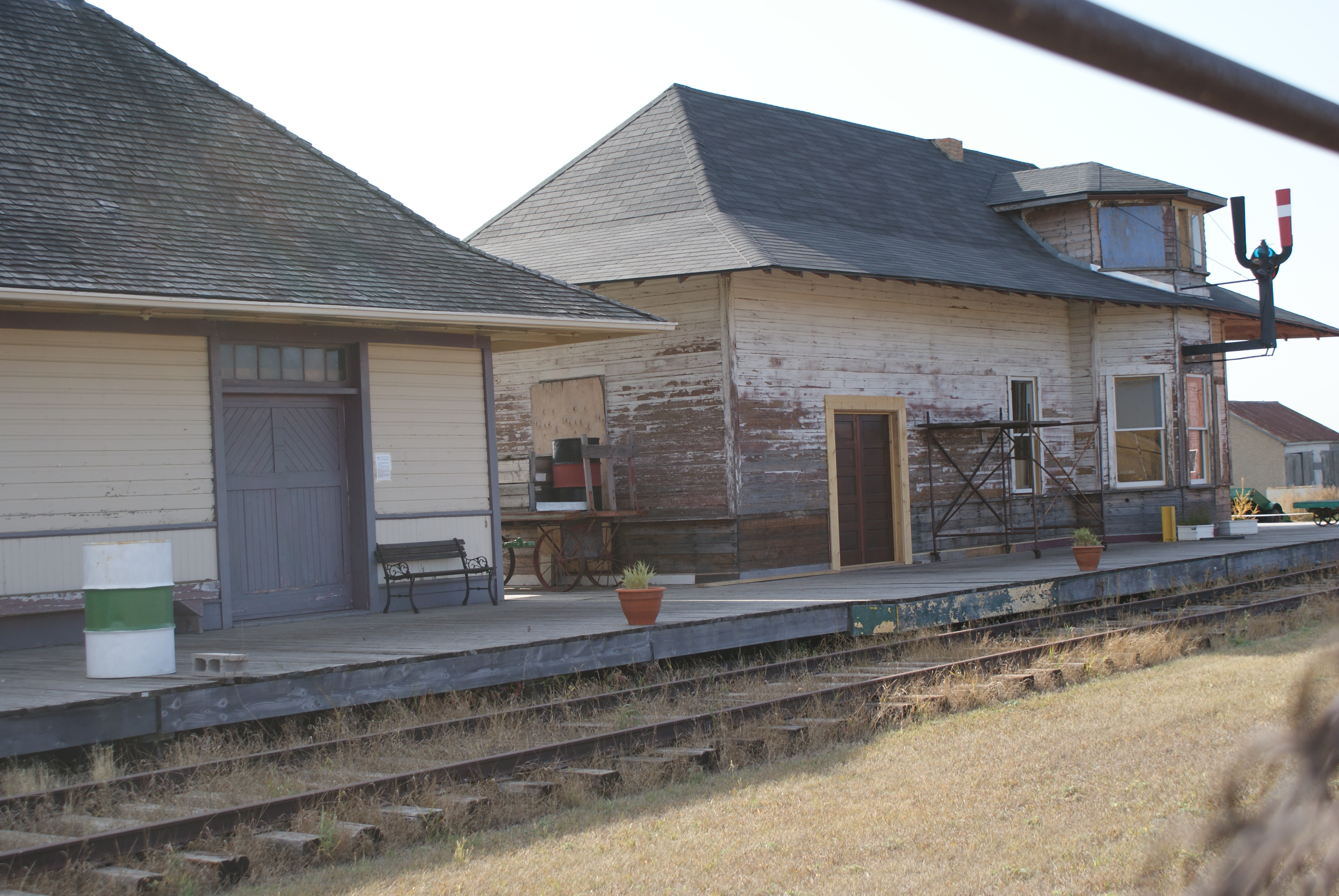
Sask Railway museum

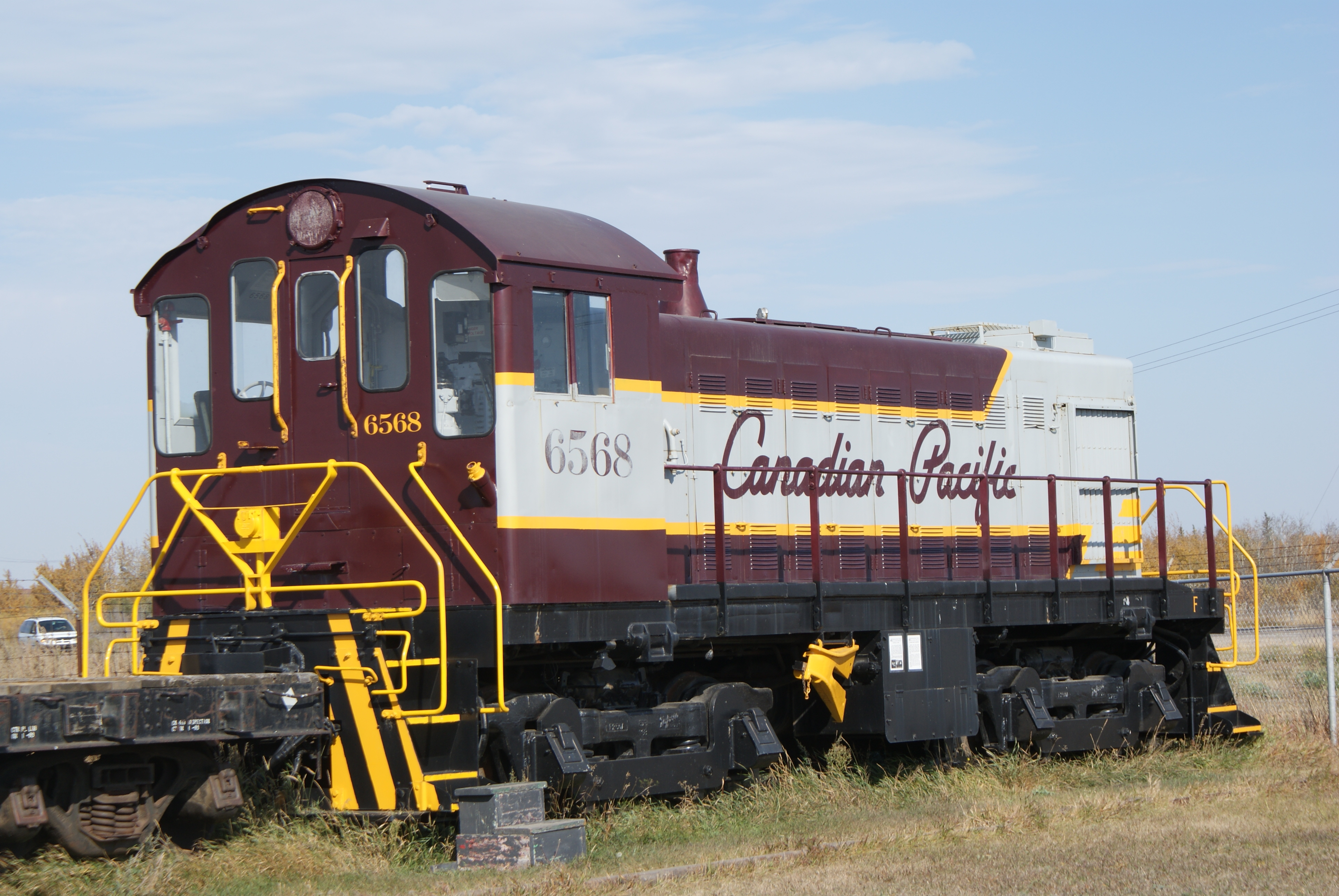
The Sask Railway museum's Canadian Pacific S-3

== Locomotives ==
The museum has a Canadian Pacific S-3 locomotive originally built by the Montreal Locomotive Works in 1957 to a design originally developed by the American Locomotive Company. Between 2001 and 2006 the S-3 was restored and painted in original period colours and is now on display.

The museum has a smaller General Electric 23-short-ton (21-long-ton; 21 t) diesel electric locomotive built in 1941. This unit was originally used by the US Army and US Air Force before being purchased by SaskPower for use on the Saskatoon coal-fired A. L. Cole power plant before the site was decommissioned. This is augmented with a Canadian Pacific trackmobile built by crane manufacturer Whiting Corporation in 1957.

== Street cars ==
The Saskatoon Municipal Railway operated street cars (also known as trams) from New Year's Day 1913 until 1951. They had a cumulative total of 56 streetcars; three of which are now owned by the museum. Car 40, built by the Preston Car Company in 1911, was originally used in Calgary before being obtained by Saskatoon in 1919. It was one of seven units obtained from a trade with Calgary for six larger units that were too heavy to cross the Traffic Bridge. Car 51 was built by the National Steel Car company in 1927, and operated in Saskatoon until the end of street car service. Both of these cars have been restored to original colours.

Car 203 was built by the Cincinnati Car Company in 1918. It was in service in Cleveland, Ohio and the city of London, Ontario before being purchased by Saskatoon. Restoration on this car has not started.

Saskatoon Municipal Railway streetcars

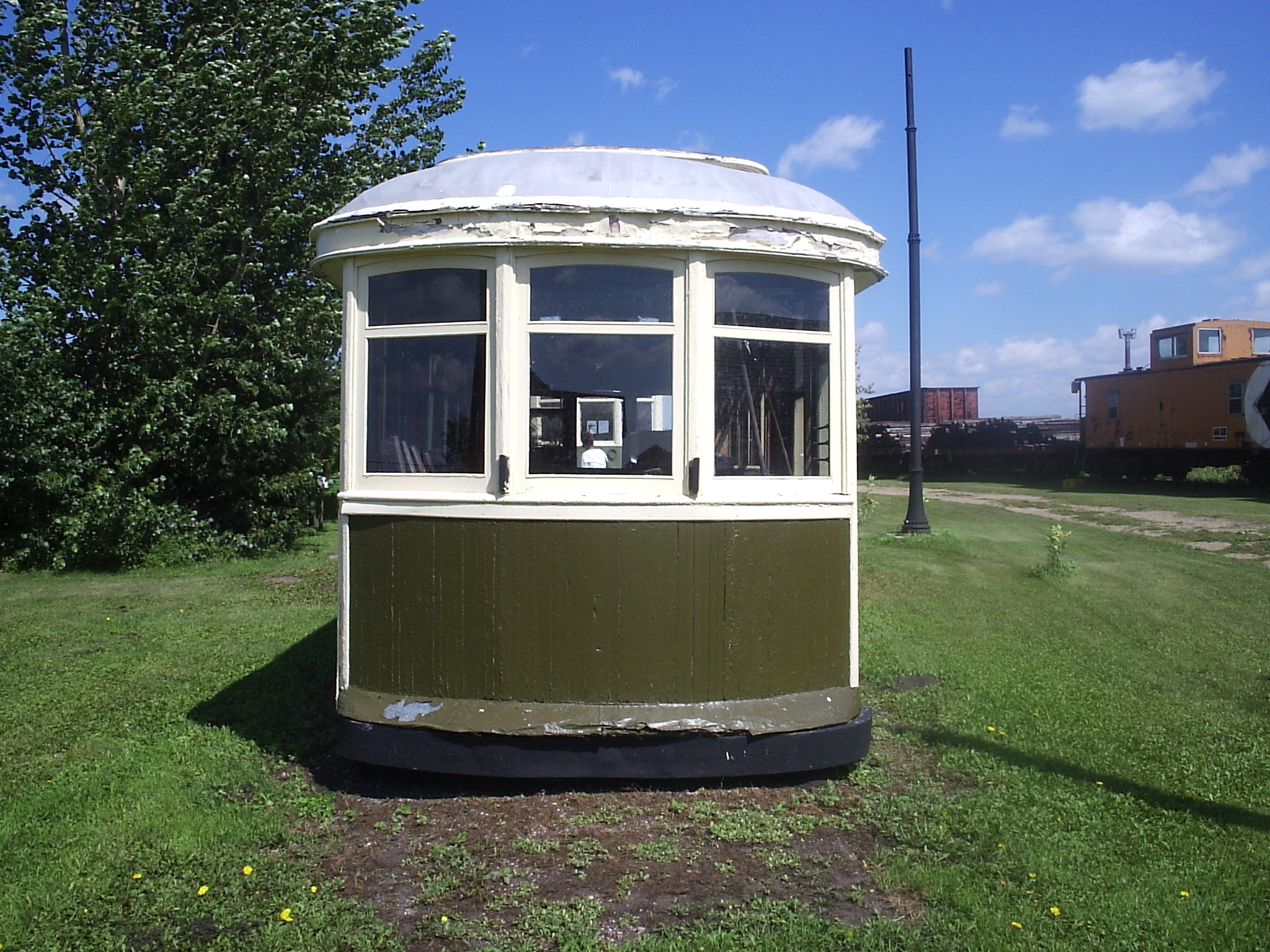
Saskatoon Municipal Railway streetcar No. 40 at Saskatchewan Railway Museum

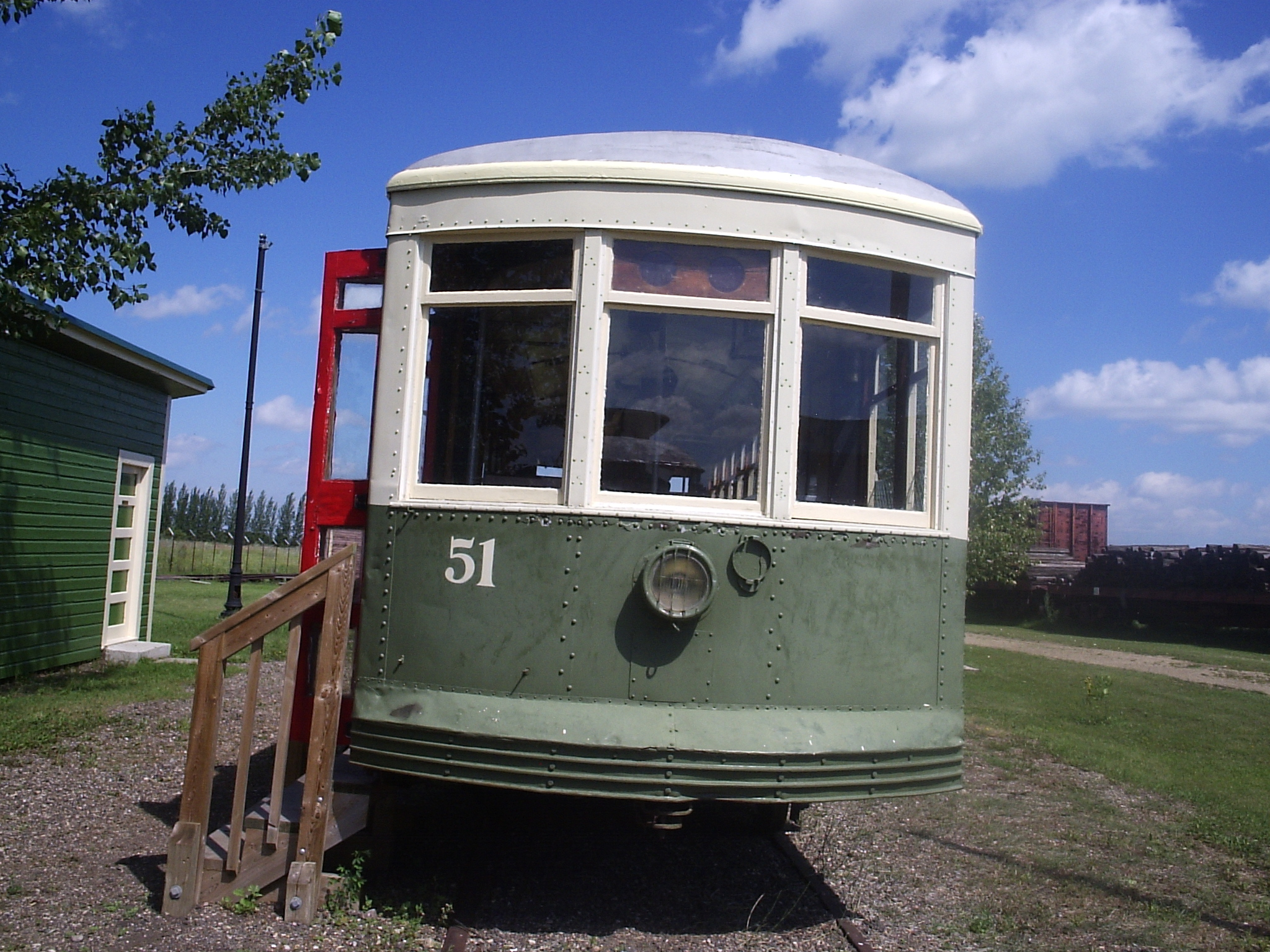
Saskatoon Municipal Railway streetcar No. 51 at Saskatchewan Railway Museum

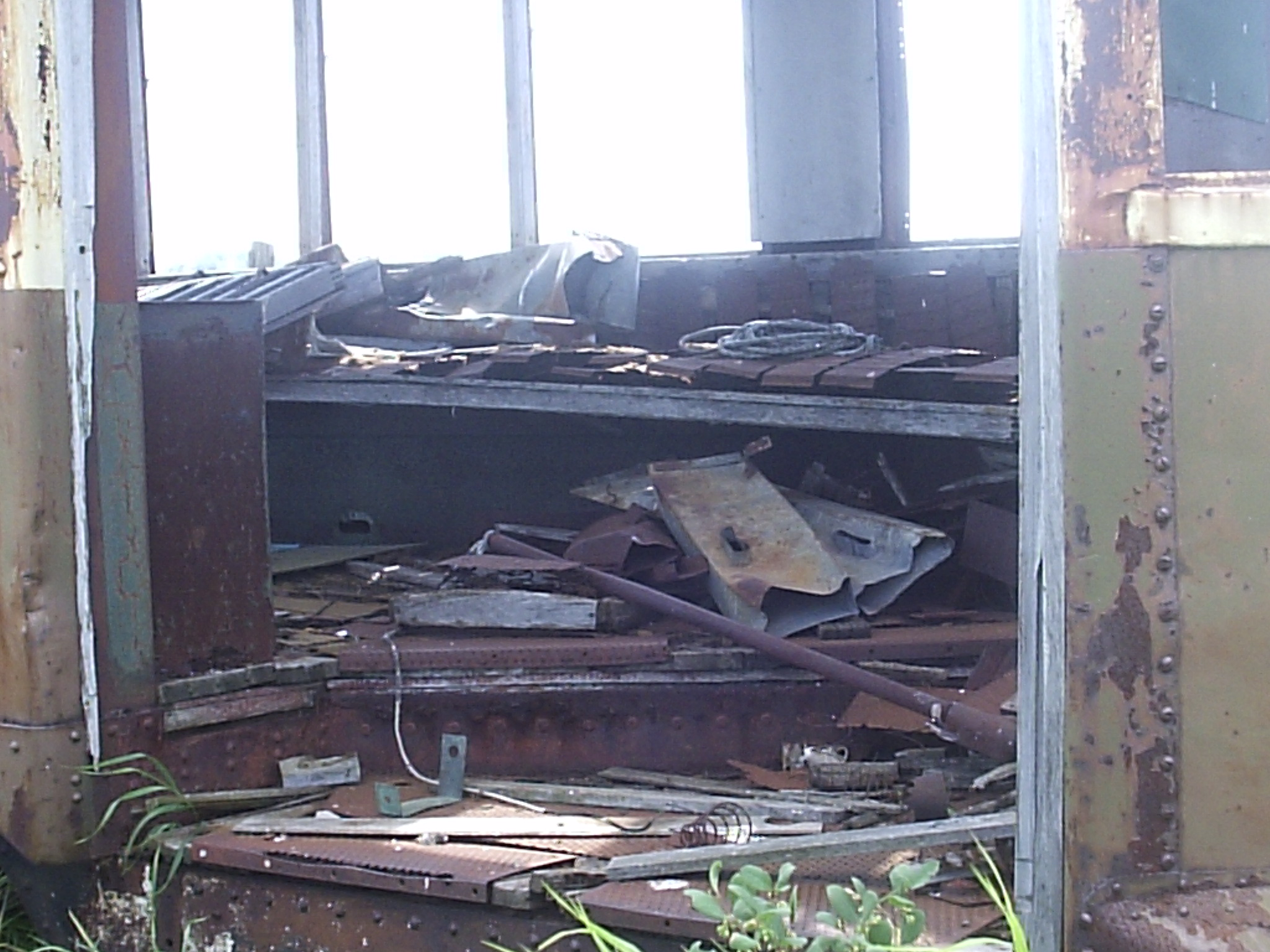
The interior of Saskatoon Municipal Railway streetcar No. 203 at Saskatchewan Railway Museum

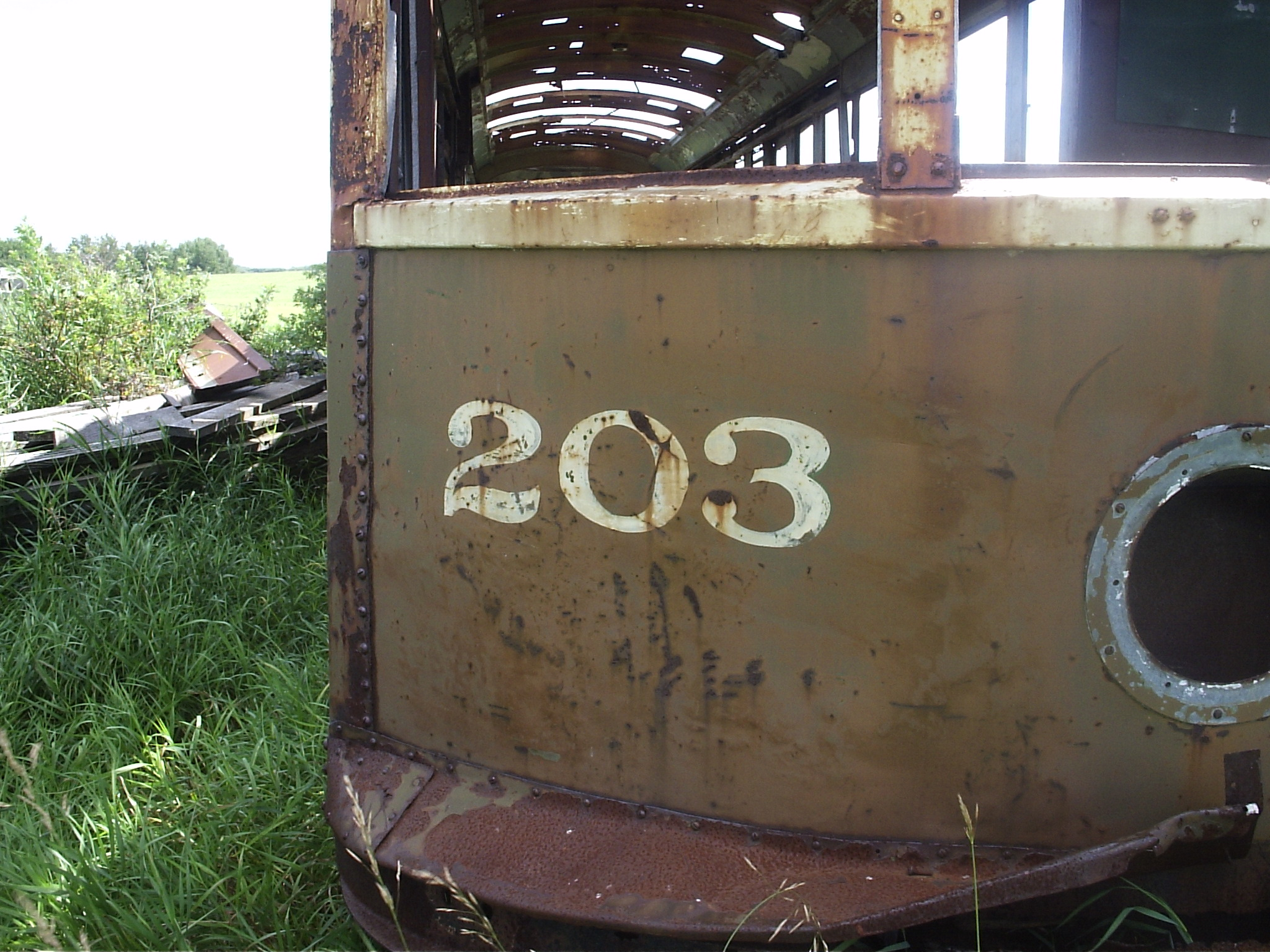
Saskatoon Municipal Railway streetcar No. 203 at Saskatchewan Railway Museum

== Passenger and freight service cars ==
The Canadian Pacific kirkella is on display. It was built by the Pullman Company in 1913 as a first class sleeping car; it was in regular service until 1956 when it was converted for use on a work train as a carman's sleeper. The car was used when filming Summer of the Monkeys.

The museum has Canadian Pacific and Canadian National boxcars, flat beds and a hopper car on display. A Cominco tank car is also on display.

== Special cars ==
The museum has two snow ploughs on display. The Canadian Pacific plow was manufactured in 1913, while the Canadian National plow was manufactured in 1927.

The museum has speeders, wash cars and boarding cars used by work crews on display. Also on display is a 300 horsepower (220 kW) diesel emergency generator car built by Canadian Car and Foundry in 1928 and owned by SaskPower.

== Buildings ==
The buildings are former railway stations and service buildings moved to the site from other parts of Saskatchewan.

=== Canadian Northern Railway ===
- Six Person Bunkhouse circa 1919 from Maymont; now used as a gift shop
- Brisbin Station circa 1918, originally used in Debden before being moved to Brisbin
- Borden Tool Shed

=== Canadian Pacific Railway ===
- Register Building, built 1915, Cory
- New Humboldt Tool Shed
- Old Humboldt Tool Shed
- Outlook Tool Shed, built 1915

=== Canadian National Railway ===
- Nutana Engineman's Bunkhouse, now used as the museum centre

=== Grand Trunk Pacific Railway ===
- Oban Interlocking Tower
- Unity Express Shed, built 1919
- Agro Station, built 1913

== Affiliations ==
The museum is affiliated with CMA, CHIN, and Virtual Museum of Canada.

== See also ==
- Biggar railway station
- C.N. Industrial
- Eaton Internment Camp
- Saskatoon railway station – current
- Saskatoon Railway Station (Canadian Pacific) – historic
- Sutherland
- Union Station (Regina)
- Canadian Pacific Railway
- List of heritage railways in Canada
- History of rail transport in Canada
