= Regina Transit =

Public transportation agency in Regina, Saskatchewan, Canada

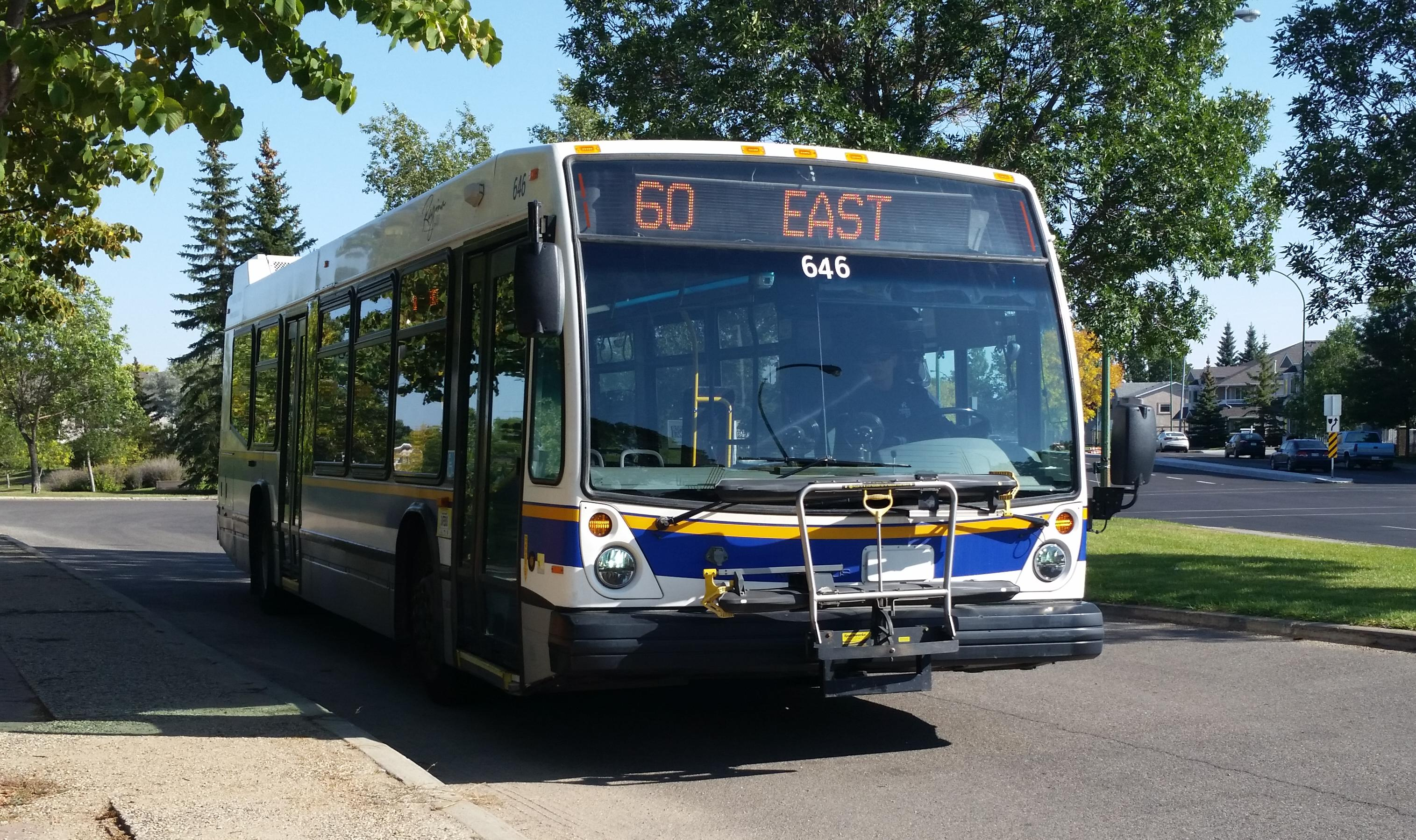
- Regina Transit Bus 646 (NovaBus LFS 40102) in the present livery (August 2018)
- Founded: 1911
- Headquarters: 333 Winnipeg Street
- Locale: Regina, SK
- Service area: Regina City limits
- Service type: bus service, paratransit
- Routes: 22
- Hubs: Cornwall Centre, Superstore East, Southland Mall, Walmart South, Golden Mile
- Fleet: 121 buses
- Annual ridership: 7,368,049
- Fuel type: Diesel
- Website: Regina.ca

Regina Transit is the public transportation agency operated by the City of Regina, Saskatchewan, Canada. It is the oldest public transit system in Saskatchewan and has been city-owned since its inception.

== History ==
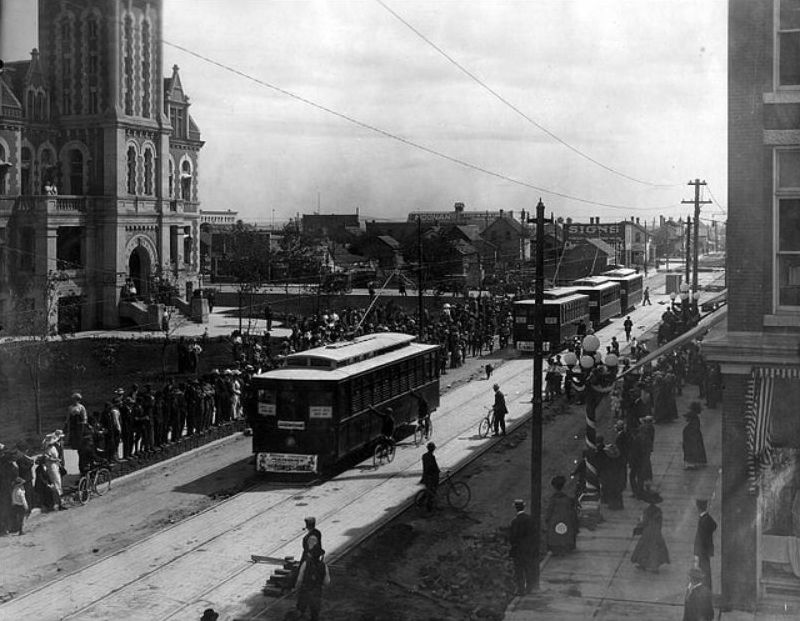
Inauguration of the Regina Municipal Railway in front of the City Hall on 11th Avenue, July 28, 1911.

Regina Transit's roots go back to July 28, 1911 (as the Regina Municipal Railway) with streetcar operations, originally on ten miles (16 km) of track, growing to 20 miles (32 km) in the early 1930s. The "Dirty Thirties" saw huge deficits resulting in major cut-backs in service. With a shortage of gasoline and steel during World War II, streetcar ridership grew dramatically. The 32 streetcars used in 1945 carried 9,000,000 more passengers than they did in 1940. An important event in the system's history was a fire in its "bus barn" on January 23, 1949, that destroyed 17 trolley coaches, nine gasoline buses, five steel streetcars and nine wooden cars. On September 5, 1950, The last streetcar made its final run through the streets of Regina and the Regina Municipal Railway became the Regina Transit System. Regina Transit provided trolley bus service from 1947 to 1966 using Canada Car and Foundry Brill trolley buses. Since 1955, its preferred transit fleet has been buses because their freedom from overhead lines makes them suitable for detours and charters. An innovation in the early 1970s was its Telebus service, which used a telephone/radio dispatching system to send buses to individual homes. This service ended in the early 1980s because of its high cost. In 2008 Regina Transit adopted three new express route centred on the university, cutting bus trip time by up to 20 minutes. On April 10, 2013, the city of Regina approved a major route network change.

== Fares ==
Fares are as of May 11th.

Fares can be paid using the R Card, where you load individual fares onto to pay your fare on buses. Buses also accept cash or coins, though exact change is required.

Typical cash fare is $3.25 for adults (ages 19-64), though youth (ages 14-18) ride for $2.75 and children (ages 0-13) ride for free. Riders also have the choice to purchase 10-20 tickets for a discounted price.

Category	Cash Fare	10 Rides	20 Rides
Adult (19-64)	3.25	29.00	55.00
Youth (14-18)	2.75	24.50	46.00
Child (0-13)	FREE	N/A	N/A
Senior	3.25	29.00	55.00

== Routes ==
=== Regular service ===
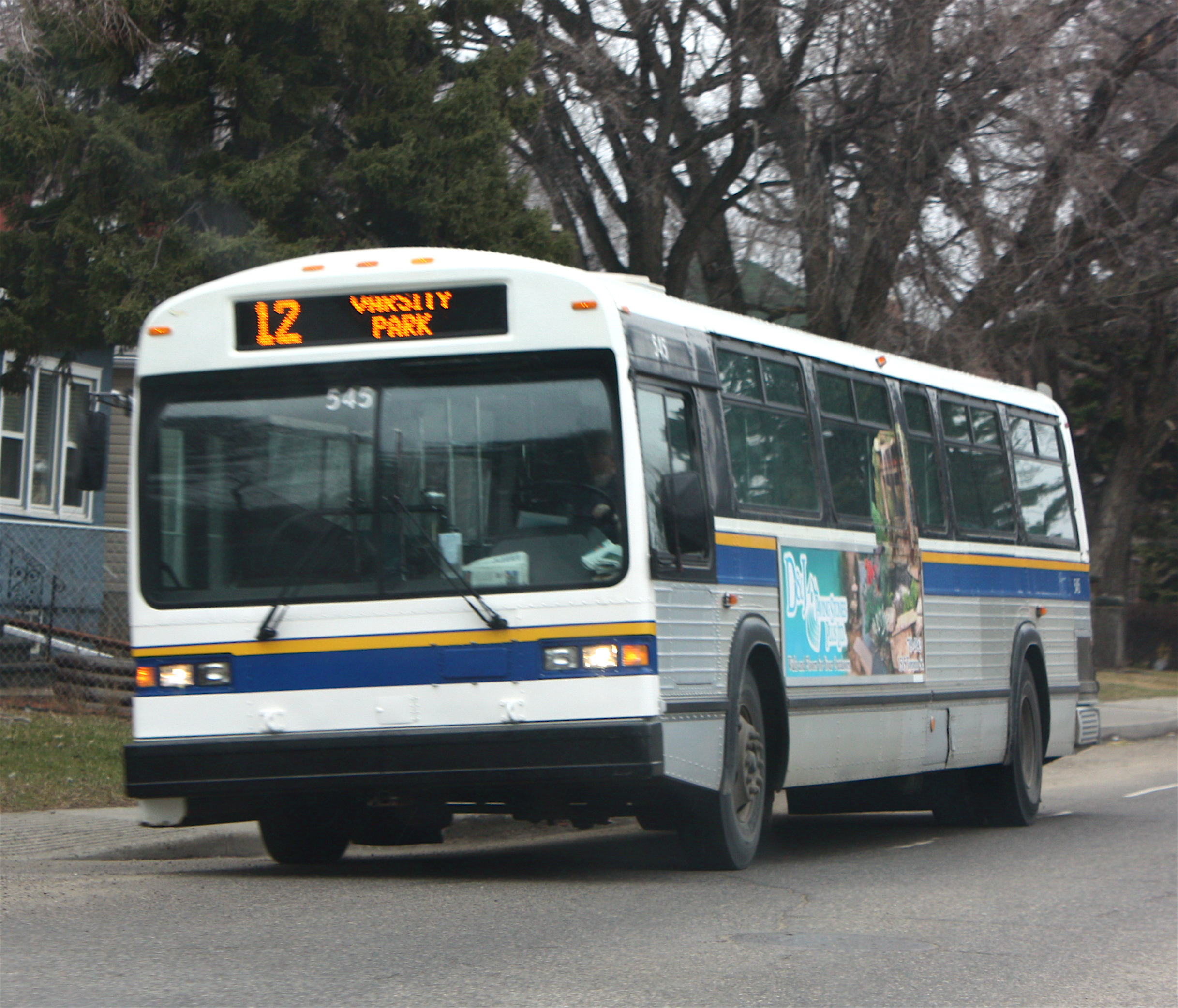
Regina Transit Bus 545 (TC40-102N Classic) in present livery (2009)

Regina Transit operates 22 routes on weekdays, 12 routes on Saturdays and 9 routes on Sunday with statutory holidays following Sunday schedule

- 1 Dieppe or Westerra/Broad North
- 2 Argyle Park/Wood Meadows
- 3 University/Sherwood Estates
- 4 Hillsdale/Walsh Acres
- 5 Uplands/Downtown
- 6 Westhill/Ross Industrial
- 7 Glencairn/Whitmore Park
- 8 Eastview/Normandy Heights
- 9 Parkridge/Albert Park
- 10 Normanview/RCMP
- 12 Varsity Park/Mount Royal
- 15 Heritage
- 16 Lakeridge/Hawkstone
- 17 Mapleridge
- 18 University/Harbour Landing
- 21 University/Glencairn
- 22 University/Arcola East
- 24 Airport/Downtown
- 30 University/Rochdale Express
- 40 Albert Street Express
- 50 Victoria East Express/Victoria Downtown Express
- 60 Arcola East Express/Arcola Downtown Express

=== Mosaic Stadium shuttle ===
Regina Transit offers free shuttle bus service to Mosaic Stadium during major events held at the stadium, including Saskatchewan Roughriders football games.

=== High School Special ===
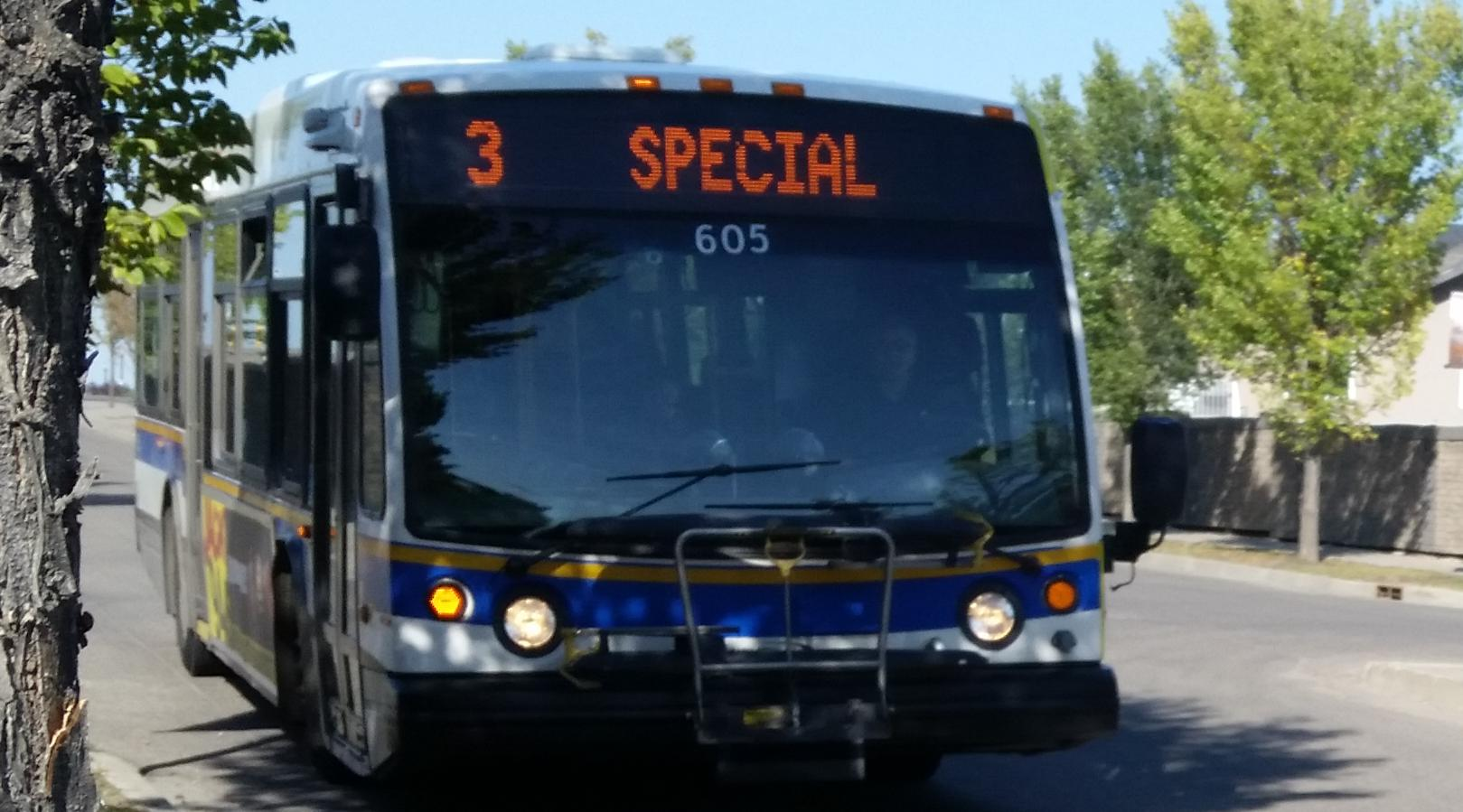
Regina Transit NovaBus 605 operating on Route 53 (Special Route 3), August 2018.

Regina transit offers a service for students travelling to LeBoldus, Campbell Collegiate, Balfour Collegiate, Miller Comprehensive, Sheldon Williams Collegiate, Winston Knoll and Riffel high schools. Routes 51, 53, 56, 58, and 59 (labeled as Special 1, Special 3, Special 6, Special 8, and Special 9) operate once in the morning and once in the afternoon. These routes are operated in the same ways as the regular Regina Transit services, except for the fact that students must flag the bus down in areas not covered by mainline service.

== Bus fleet ==
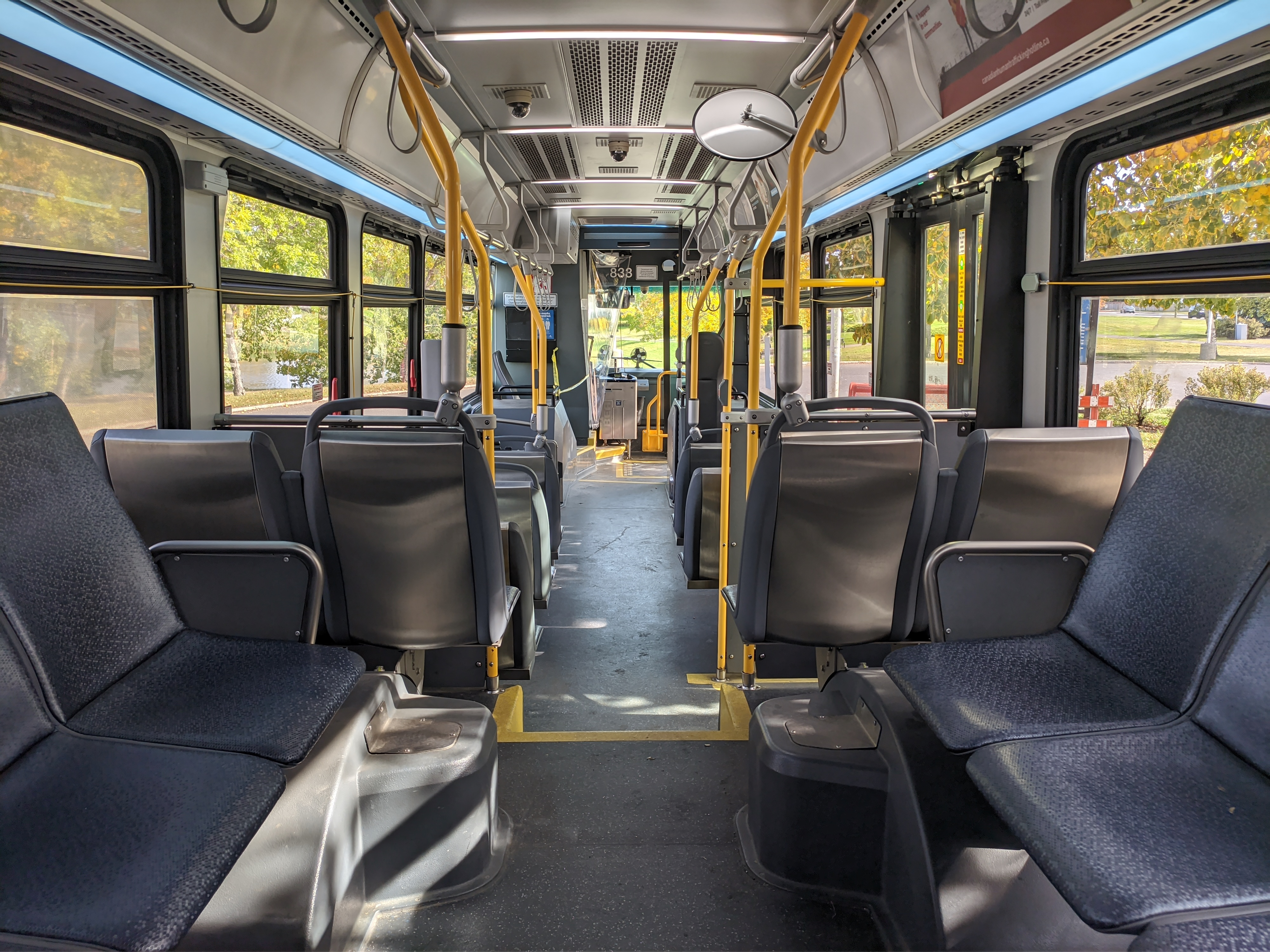
Cabin of Regina Transit NovaBus 833, facing the front

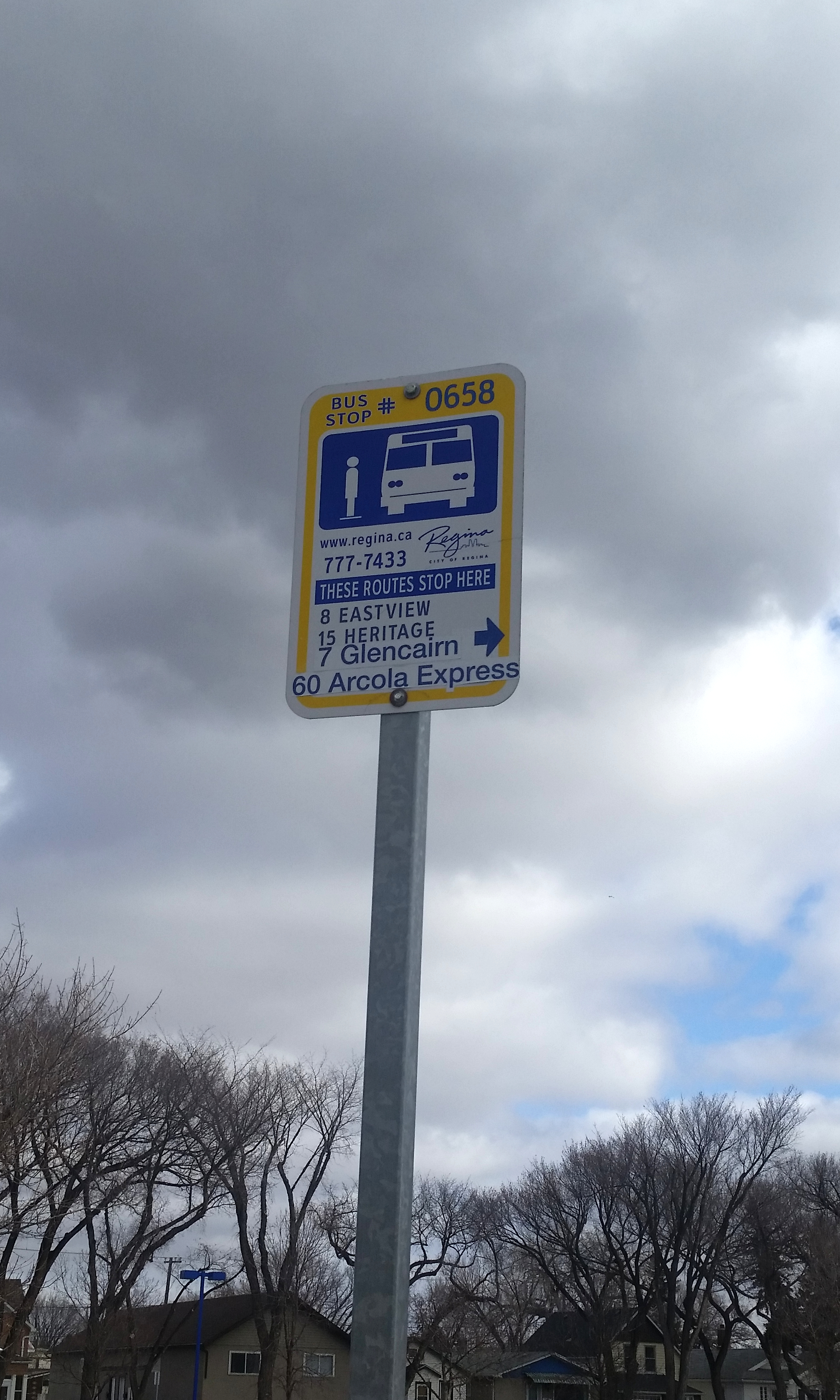
Typical sign for a Regina Transit bus stop

Regina Transit's fleet consists mostly of Nova Buses, with a few Vicinity operating on less-busy routes. As of 2014, all buses in the Regina Transit fleet are at least partially low-floored, as all high-floor buses were retired around that time.

Regina Transit Fleet
Bus	Number	Seating	Notes
Novabus LFS	118	37
Grande West Vicinity 30'	3	24	Used on routes with less demand

=== NovaBus Fleet ===
The Nova Bus fleet is the backbone of Regina Transit's fleet, consisting of Nova Bus LFS buses. Buses built in 1998-99 were originally built for CATS and were numbered 801-809 and are now retired. Buses built in 1996-1998 were originally built for STM are also retired and were moved to Saskatoon Transit. Buses manufactured between 2005 and 2019 are numbered 598-665 and 667-699 and 812–836.

=== Vicinity Fleet ===
The Vicinity fleet is used on less-busy routes, such as Route 15 - Heritage, as they have less capacity. Currently only 3 buses are in the fleet, numbered 708, 709 and 710. The buses were built in 2017. They are also used on the route 24 to the airport (CYQR) and back.

== Paratransit Services ==
Regina Transit operates a charter bus service and a 33-fleet paratransit service for residents who cannot use the regular transit system. Regina Transit Services has been working with the Saskatchewan Human Rights Commission to improve accessibility and inclusivity of public transportation since 2013. The SHRC recognized the work of the City of Regina in 2016. Part of that work includes the introduction of low-floor accessible buses and installation of audible stop announcements. Regina Transit continues to improve the accessibility of its services.
