= Reiffel =

Reiffel is a surname. Notable people with the surname include:

- Charles Reiffel (1862–1942), American lithographer and painter
- Leonard Reiffel (1927–2017), American physicist and writer
- Lou Reiffel (1910–1977), Australian rules footballer
- Paul Reiffel (born 1966), Australian cricketer and umpire
- Ron Reiffel (1932–2018), Australian rules footballer

== See also ==
- Ben Reifel (1906–1990), public administrator and politician
- George C. Reifel Migratory Bird Sanctuary, in British Columbia
