= Kitchener Public Utilities Commission =

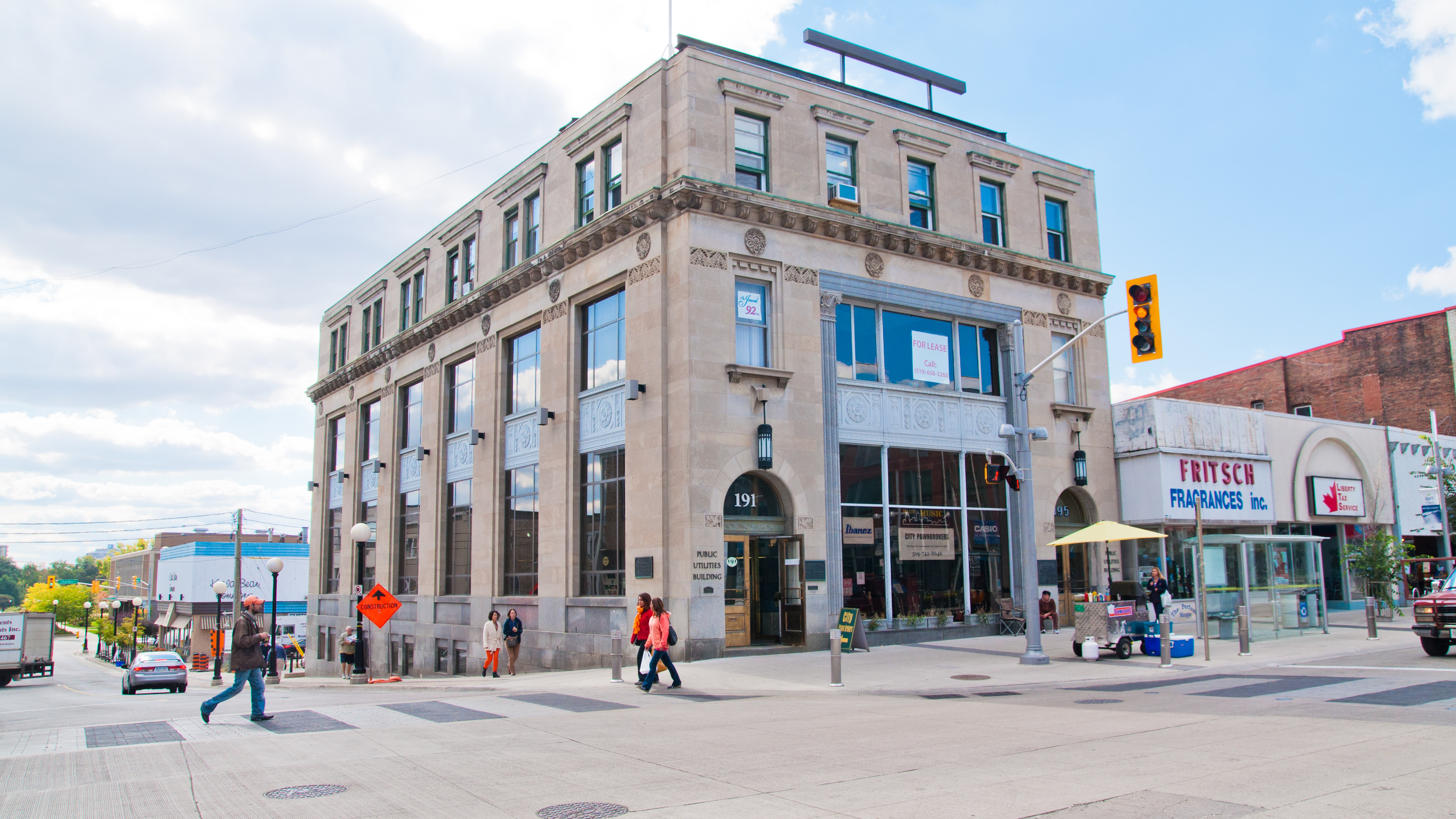
Kitchener's Public Utilities Commission building.

The Kitchener Public Utilities Commission (KPUC, or PUC) was the municipal public utilities commission for the city of Kitchener, Ontario, Canada, as well as the surrounding area. Its former office in downtown Kitchener, constructed in 1931 in Beaux-Arts style, has been designated under the Ontario Heritage Act as both historically and architecturally significant, and is one of the Kitchener's few surviving historic public buildings.

== Transit services ==
Transit service began with horse cars in 1887 as a private company whose owner was from New York City with day-to-day operations via Thomas M. Burt.

The line was electrified for streetcars a few years later. The city did not renew the charter and the KPUC took over in 1927.

The KPUC operated streetcars until 1946, as bus and trolley bus operations took over.

The electric streetcars were scheduled to be retired on January 1, 1947. An ice storm on December 27, 1946 caused so much damage to the overhead that it was not repaired.

Cross-town gasoline buses started in the 1930s.

Trolley coach operation began on January 1, 1947, and ended by March 26, 1973.

Transit operations were passed on to the City of Kitchener in 1973 and was operated with all-new bus routes as Kitchener Transit. Utilities operations, for gas, water and sewer services within the City of Kitchener are now run by Kitchener Utilities, a subsidiary of the municipality.

In 2015, during the construction of the new Ion Light Rail system, remnants of the local streetcar system were unearthed.

=== Roster ===
==== Buses ====
- 10 Yellow Coach model 733 bus
- 2 CCF-Brill model C-36 gas bus
- 2 Brills - ex-Wellesley Bus Lines
- 1 Ford - ex-Wellesley Bus Lines* 1 Aerocoach - ex-Wellesley Bus Lines

Roster as of December 31, 1972. City of Kitchener took over January 1, 1973. Trolley buses replaced March 26, 1973. Kitchener Transit launched with all new routes on July 3, 1973.

- 101 - 117 (odd numbers only). Nine, 1946 Canadian Car & Foundry T-44 electric trolley buses. #103, first production T-44, 119 burned in fire and scrapped Dec. 28, 1970.
- 121 - 129 (odd numbers only). Five, 1947 Canadian Car & Foundry T-44 electric trolley buses.
- 131 One, 1948 Canadian Car & Foundry T-44 electric trolley buses.
- 133 - 141 (odd numbers only). Five, 1951 CanCar ex-Ottawa Transportation Commission T-48 electric trolley buses. Purchased in 1959.
- 572 - 577 Six, 1957 General Motors TGH-3102 gasoline buses. 571 retired pre-1973.
- 591 - 595 Five, 1959 General Motors TGH-3102 gasoline buses.
- 601 - 605 Five, 1960 General Motors TGH-3102 gasoline buses.
- 606 One, 1960 ex. Oshawa Transportation Commission General Motors TGH-3102 gasoline bus. Purchased 1967
- 641 - 643 Three, 1964 General Motors TGH-3501 gasoline buses.
- 651 - 654 Four, 1965 General Motors TGH-3501 gasoline buses.
- 661 - 669 Nine, 1966 General Motors TGH-3501 gasoline buses.
- 671 - 678 Eight, 1967 General Motors TDH-3501 diesel buses.
- 680 - 689 Ten, 1968 General Motors TDH-3502 diesel buses.
- 690 - 691 Two, 1969 GMDD T6H-5305 diesel buses.
- 700 - 701 Two, 1971 GMDD T6H-5305 diesel buses. Ordered in 1970. Manufacturing started in 1970 and finished in 1971. First two T6H-5305 buses completed in 1971.
- 720 - 721 Two, 1972 GMDD T6H-5307N diesel buses.

==== Streetcars ====
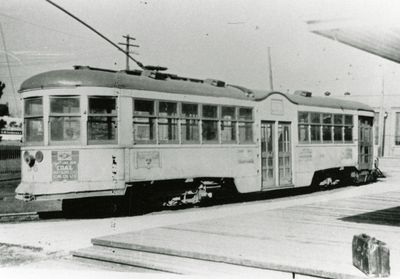
A Kitchener Public Utilities Commission streetcar, c. 1945, identified as KWSR No. 36.

All time streetcar fleet:

Berlin and Waterloo Street Railway Company

- 8 open single truck horsecars 1888
- 8 closed single truck horsecars 1888
  - 3 converted as electric cars 1895; used until 1896
- 2 open cars from Canadian General Electric 1896; retired 1922
- 2 closed cars from Canadian General Electric 1896; retired 1932
- 1 single truck double end car - ex-horsecar sold by new electric railway operator Buffalo Railway Company
- 3 single truck open trailer cars
- 2 double truck double end cars from Ottawa Car Company 1901 and 1908
- 1 single truck double end car - ex-Buffalo car and later work car (scraper)
- 1 single truck double end car from J.G. Brill 1910 - converted as sweeper
- 3 single end double truck cars - ex-Montreal Park and Island Railway (built by Montreal Street Railway) with 1 converted as flat car
- 1 single truck double end closed trailer 1918 - ex-Toronto Street Railway horsecar from J.M. Jones' Sons

Preston & Berlin Street Railway

- 2 single end double truck cars from Preston Car Company 1912; scrapped 1947
- 3 single end double truck cars from G. C. Kuhlman Car Company 1919; scrapped 1941 and 1947
- 5 Peter Witt cars 1922 - ex-Cleveland cars from Cincinnati Car Company; scrapped 1947

Bridgeport and Berlin Electric Street Railway

- 1 double truck double end car from N & A.C. Lariviere 1902

Kitchener & Waterloo Street Railway

- 2 single truck Birney safety cars from Ottawa Car Company 1923; scrapped 1947
- 1 single truck double end sweeper from J.G. Brill 1924
- 1 Birney car 1928 - ex-Peterborough Radial from Cincinnati Car 1920; sold 1946

=== Routes ===
==== Bus routes ====
Routes as of December 31, 1972:

- Route 1 Queen South - Queen North & Frederick
- Route 2 North Ward - Highland Road
- Route 3 East & South Wards - Westmount
- Route 4 Fairfield — Rosemount
- Route 5 Waterloo Crosstown
- Route 6 Bridgeport
- Route 7 Mainline (Trolley Coach)
- Route 8 Forest Hill
- Route 9 Lakeshore
- Route 10 Kingsdale
- Route 11 Stanley Park
- Route 12 Industrial Park
- Route 13 University
- Route 14 Columbia
- Route 15 Amos Avenue
- Route 16 Ottawa South

==== Streetcar routes ====
- King Street from Cedar Street (Bridgeport Road) in Waterloo to Scott Street in Berlin (Kitchener)
- Victoria Street from King Street to Weber Street, Berlin

=== Facilities ===
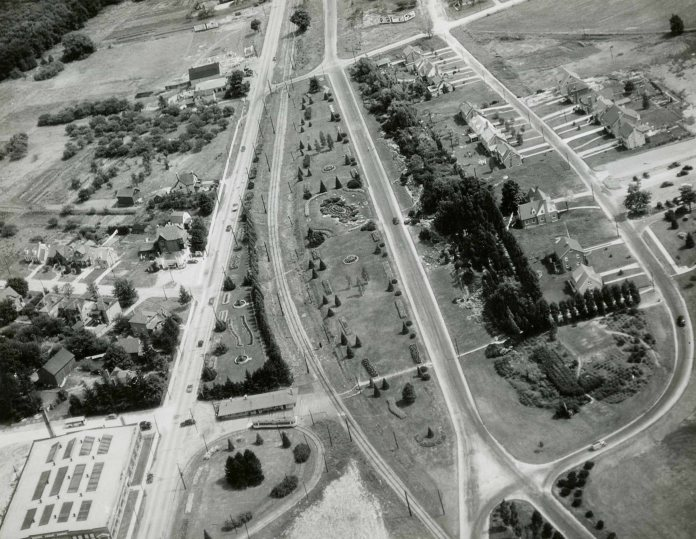
An aerial view of the Rockway area c. 1944, showing Kitchener Junction to the bottom left.

- Horsecar barn and stable at Cedar Street (now Bridgeport Road) and King Street - built 1888 for Berlin and Waterloo Street Railway Company
- Car barn at King Street and Albert Street 1905 - built to replace original barn from 1888
- Car barns at Preston Junction (King Street East and Rogers Road now in Cambridge) and Albert Street in Berlin (now Kitchener) 1904 - for Preston & Berlin Street Railway
- Car barn at Kitchener Junction 1923 - replaces Preston & Berlin Street Railway barns in Kitchener
- Bridgeport car barn (eastside of Bridgeport Road and King Street) 1923

== See also ==
- Brantford Public Utilities Commission
