= Lariviere =

Lariviere may refer to:

- Larivière-Arnoncourt, a commune in the Haute-Marne department in northeastern France
- Larivière, a 19th-century Canadian sleigh and bus manufacturer

Larivière may be a surname given to :

- Alphonse Alfred Clément Larivière (1842–1925), a Canadian politician and journalist, son of Montreal carriage builder Abraham Clément Larivière
- Charles-Philippe Larivière (1798–1876), a French academic painter and lithographer
- Garry Lariviere, (born 1954), retired Canadian ice hockey player
- Jacinthe Larivière, (born 1981), a Canadian figure skater
- Nil-Élie Larivière (1899–1969), a Canadian politician
- Richard W. Lariviere (born 1950), president of the University of Oregon
