= Streetcars in Montreal =

Mass transit system

Before 1959, Montreal, Quebec, Canada had an extensive streetcar system. The streetcar network had its beginnings with the horsecar era of the Montreal City Passenger Railway in 1861. The initial line was along Rue Notre Dame (Notre Dame St) from Rue du Havre (Harbor St) to Rue McGill (McGill St).

== Montreal Street Railway ==
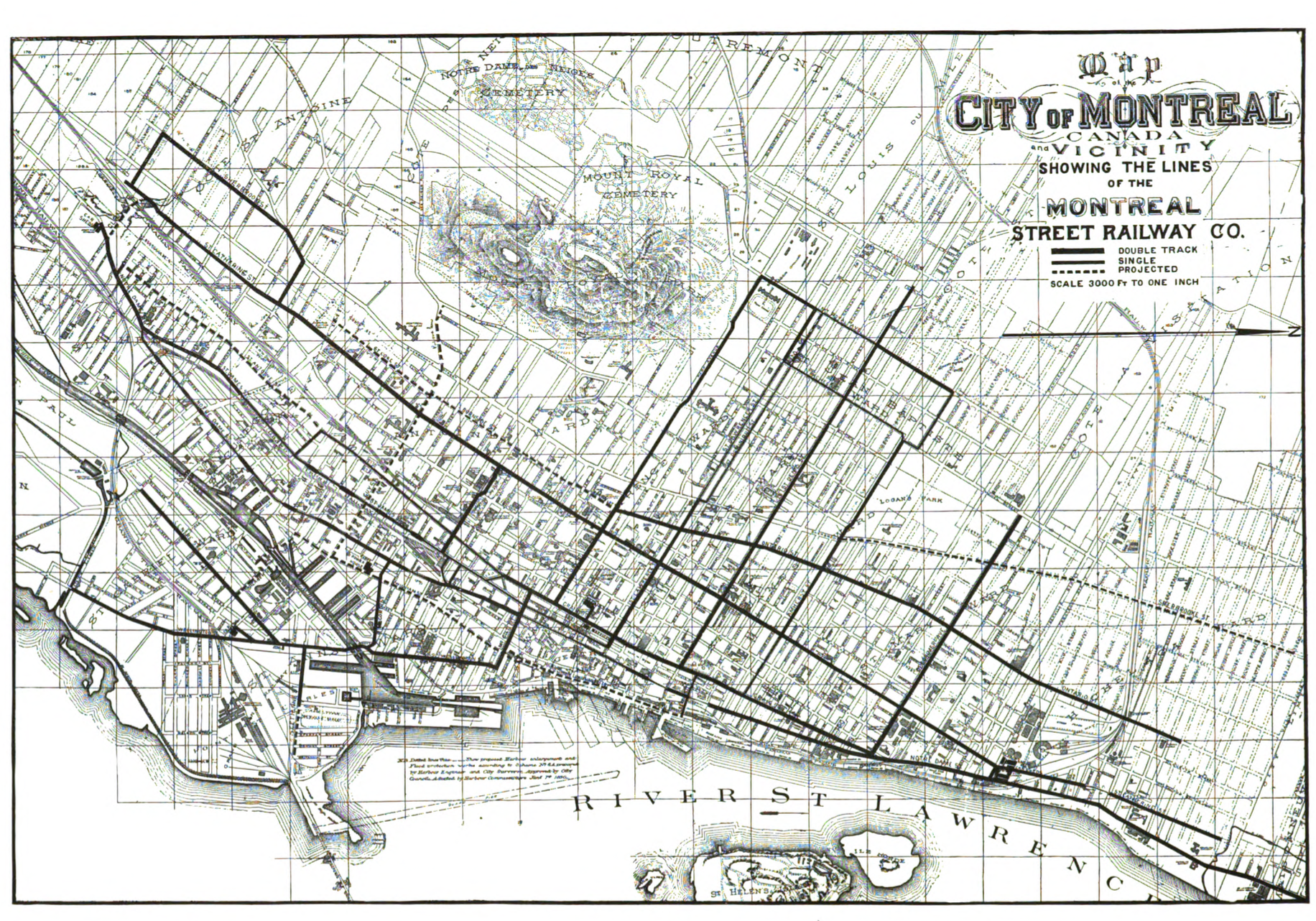
Montreal Street Railway Company c. 1894

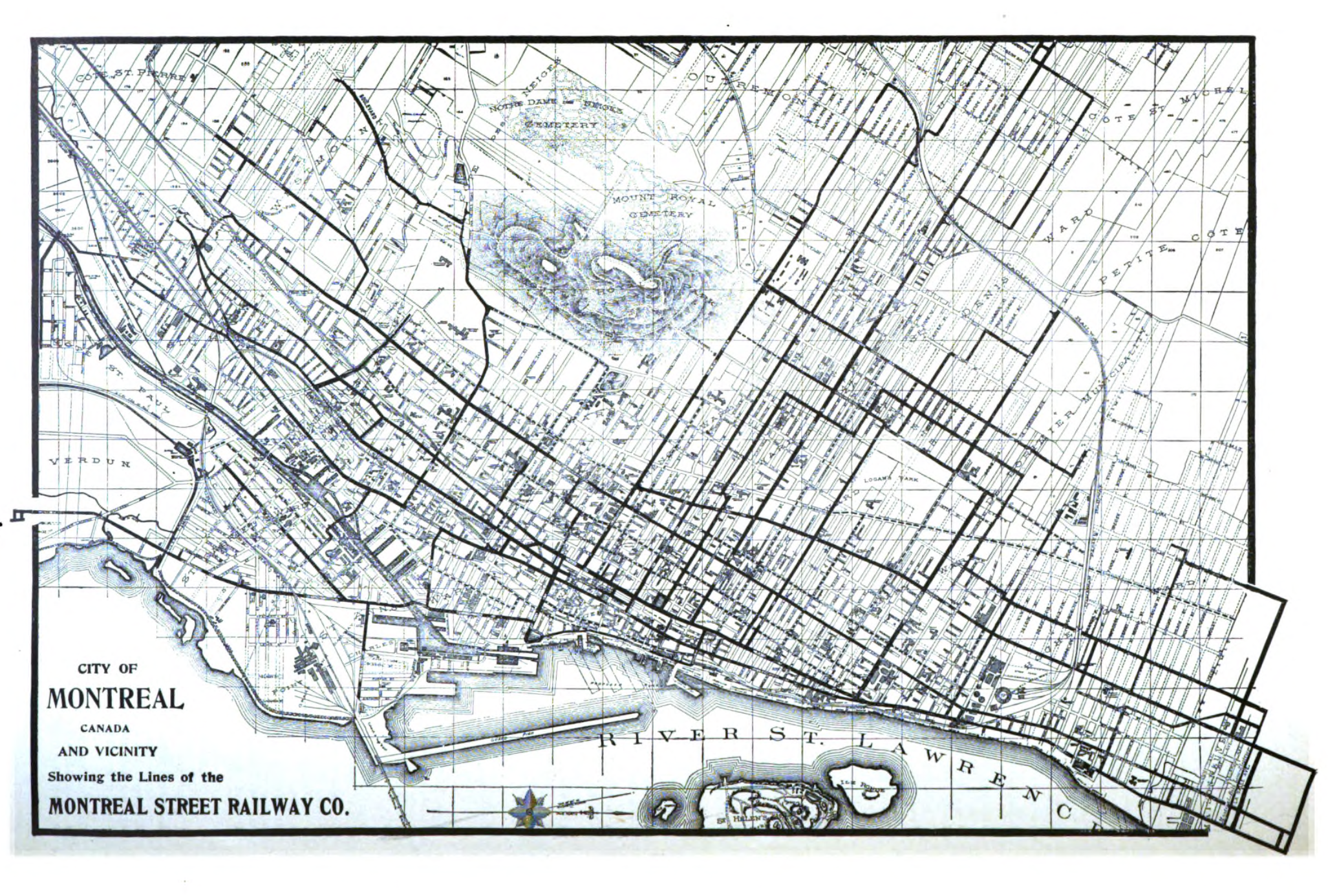
Map Showing Lines of the Montreal Street Railway Company c 1907

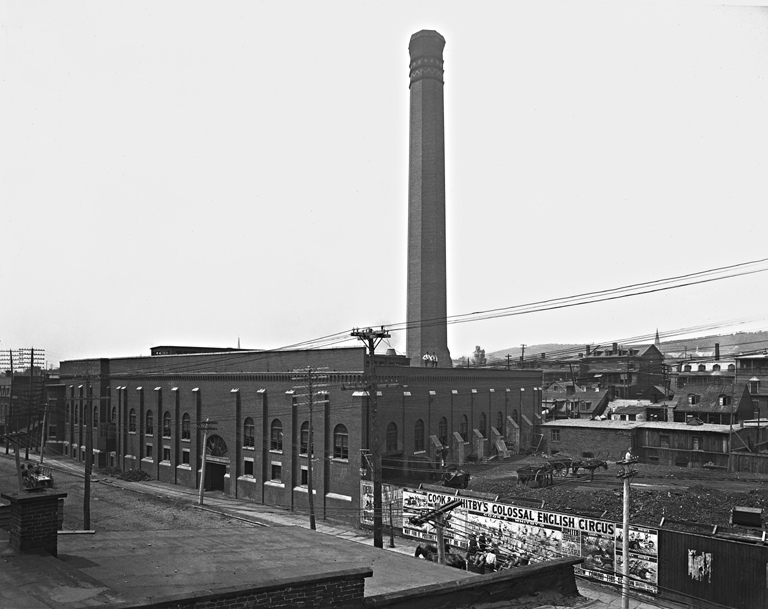
Powerhouse for the Montreal Street Railway, William Street, Montreal, 1894

The City Passenger Railway became the Montreal Street Railway in 1886. The decision to use electricity instead of horses for propulsion was made in 1892. On September 21 of that same year, "The Rocket," Montreal's first electric streetcar made its maiden voyage. By 1894, the remaining horsecar lines had all been converted to accommodate the new electrically powered streetcars. The Montreal Street Railway was known as one of the most innovative and progressive in North America. One of its innovations was the introduction of the "Pay As You Enter" (P.A.Y.E.) system of fare collection in 1905. Prior to that time, conductors would walk through the car collecting fares meaning many passengers probably rode for free on very crowded cars. The P.A.Y.E. system was adopted worldwide by many other transit companies. The company also designed and built two open sightseeing (another two were built later) cars that were in service until the late 1950s. The designs of those sightseeing cars were sold to transit companies in Quebec City, Calgary and Vancouver, who all built their own versions of the car.

== Montreal Park and Island Railway ==
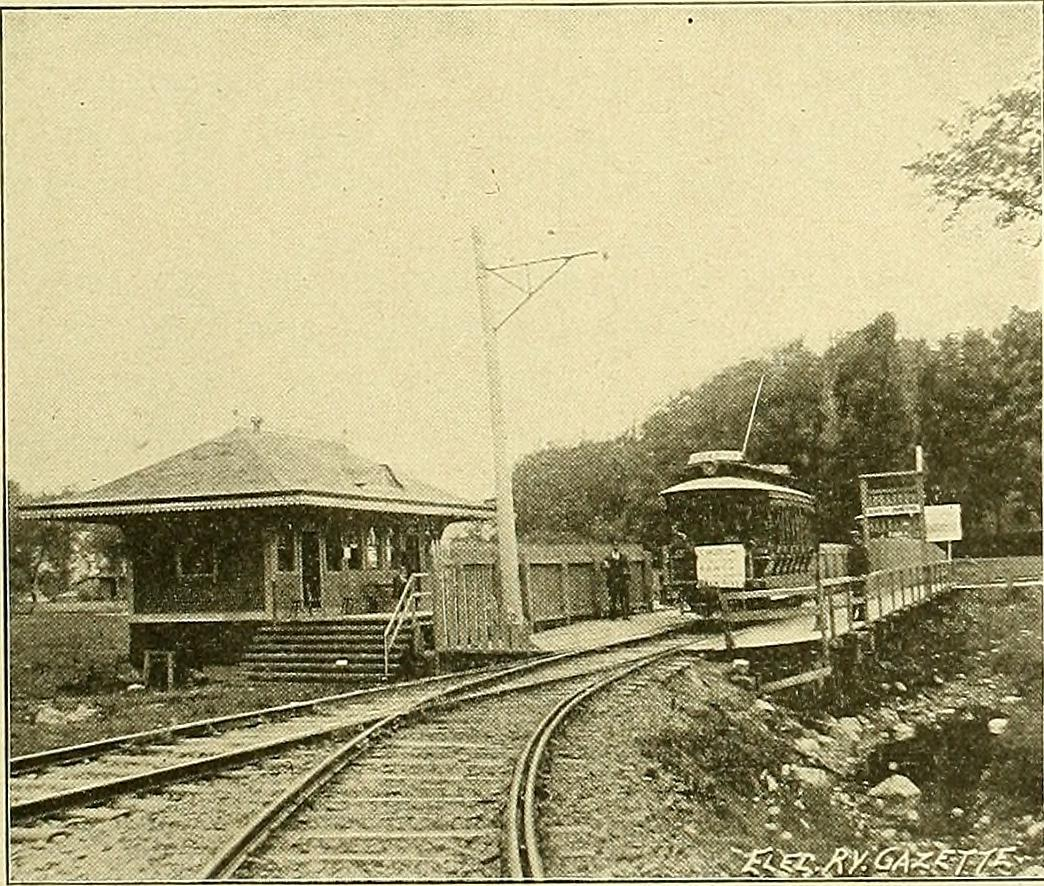
View of the Montreal Park and Island at Ahuntsic, circa 1895

The Montreal Park and Island Railway was incorporated by the Legislature of Quebec in 1885 to run railway service in the suburbs of Montreal. The company's first line to Sault-au-Récollet opened on 1893-12-27. Subsequent lines ran around the mountain via Outremont, and to Lachine, St Laurent and Cartierville. The company had an agreement with the Montreal Street Railway Co to allow MP&IR cars to run through to terminals in Montreal.

The Park and Island was eventually consolidated with other companies to form the Montreal Tramways Company in 1911.

== Montreal Tramways Company ==
In 1911 a new corporate entity, the Montreal Tramways Company was formed consolidating the city streetcar routes of the Montreal Street Railway and the suburban routes of the Montreal Park & Island Railway and the Montreal Terminal Railway. The Montreal Tramways Company would own and operate the transportation system until the system was taken over by the city-owned Montreal Transportation Commission in 1951.

=== World War II ===
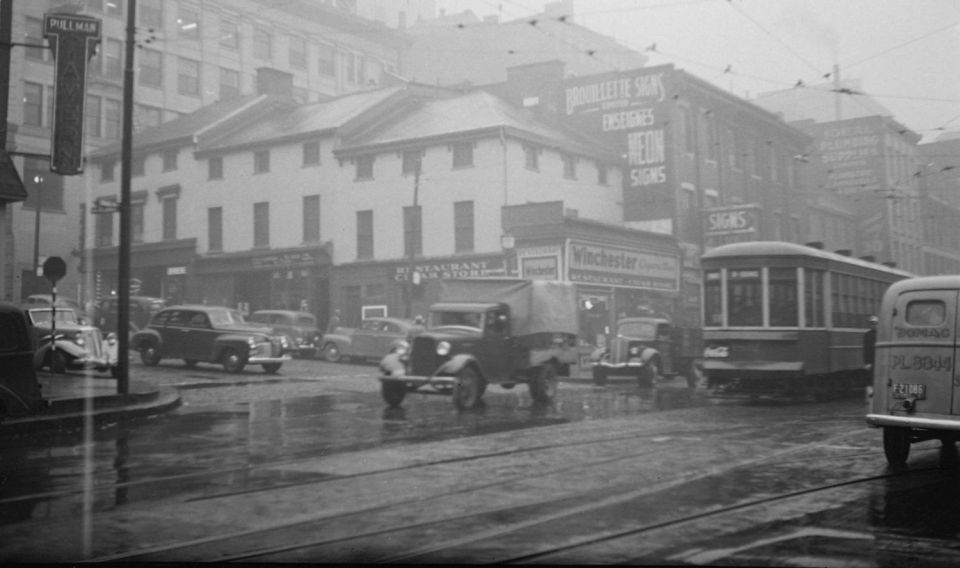
Tram on Craig Street East and St. Laurent Boulevard

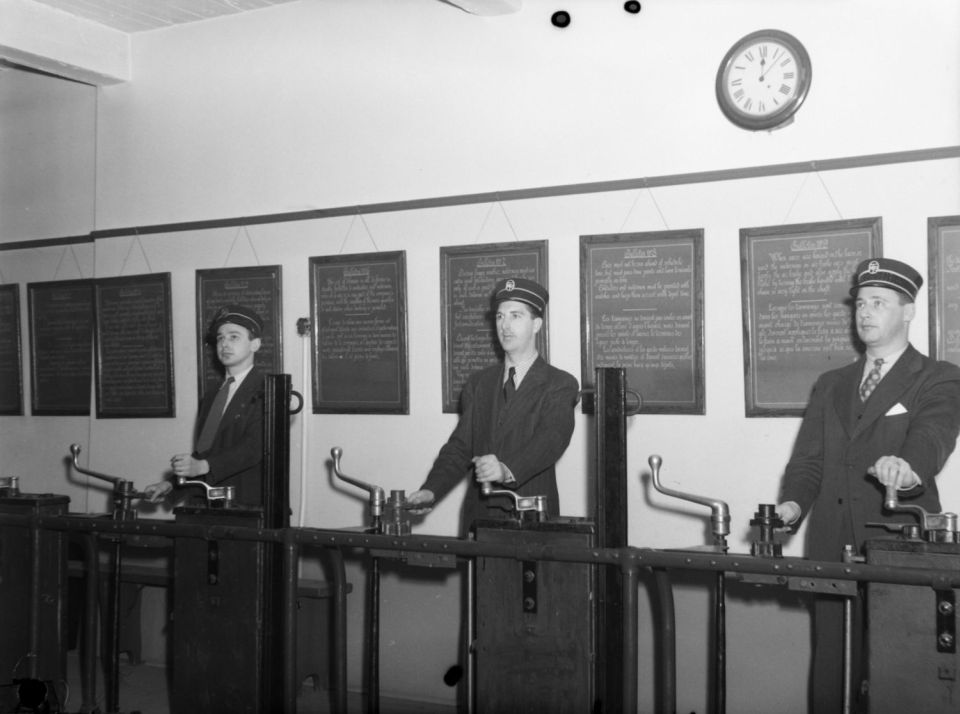
Montreal Tramways conductors training

Through the war years (1939 to 1945), Montreal's streetcar system carried huge passenger loads with workers commuting to busy factories supplying the war effort. Every available streetcar was put into service. The company even bought several streetcars from U.S. systems that were converting to buses. Even private automobile owners were taking streetcars as rationing made gasoline and tires difficult to get. Most manufacturing of private automobiles was halted about halfway through the war years so assembly plants could concentrate on military vehicles. The Montreal Tramways Company had its own difficulties in getting material and some maintenance had to be deferred. The heavy wartime traffic and deferred maintenance took its toll. The Montreal Tramways Company faced major challenges at the end of the war.

There was much rehabilitation work that had to be done to the track, the overhead trolley wires and the streetcars themselves. There was also much more competition. Manufacturing of automobiles for the civilian market started up again and after the deprivations of the war, many people began to buy one, including former streetcar passengers. Streetcar passenger numbers were starting to fall. The automobile encouraged the development of new neighborhoods further from the city centre and not served by the company's streetcars. Traffic congestion was becoming a bigger problem, especially in the narrower streets of the older parts of downtown Montreal. The company's 30-year contract with the city was also coming to an end in 1948. For all of these reasons, the company was reluctant to spend money on expansion and modernization. Instead they would sell their assets to a publicly owned transportation authority.

== Montreal Transportation Commission ==
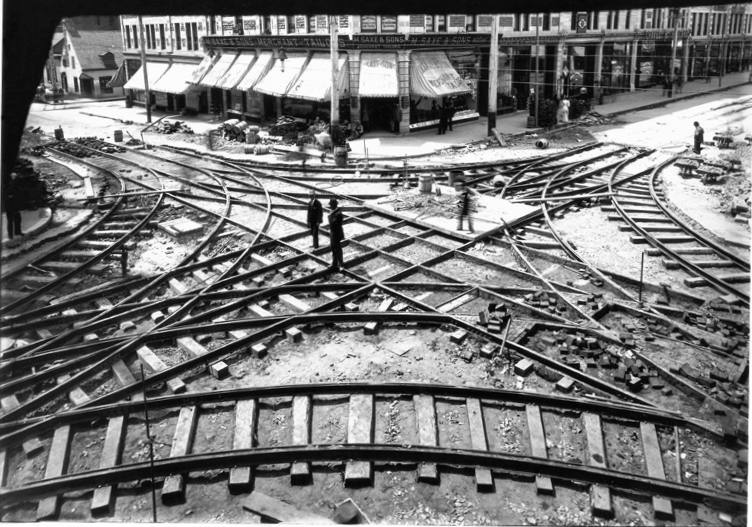
A Grand union tramway crossing under construction in Montreal at Sainte Catherine and Saint Lawrence Street in 1893.

In 1950, legislation was passed to create the city-owned Montreal Transportation Commission, which would be charged with taking over the assets of the Montreal Tramways Company, which it officially did in June 1951. The Commission decided to convert all streetcar lines to buses within 10 years.

To relieve traffic congestion, the newly established Montreal Transportation Commission decided to convert the inner city routes first. Many of Montreal's streetcar routes included running on a portion of Sainte Catherine Street (Rue Sainte-Catherine) downtown. On some downtown sections of this street, there was a headway of 10 seconds or less between streetcars but by the end of August 1956, streetcar service on the street had come to an end. A parade of streetcars and historical equipment was held to commemorate the event. Many of the outlying routes, especially those running on private rights-of-way, lasted the longest. The city's last streetcars operated on August 30, 1959, after which Montreal was served solely by buses until the Metro opened in October 1966. A parade similar to the one in 1956 was held to mark the occasion. A four-route network of electric trolley buses continued operating until 1966 at which point they were converted to Diesel.

== Golden Chariot sightseeing cars ==
In 1905, the Montreal Street Railway constructed two open-topped sightseeing streetcars locally known as Golden Chariots. Seating was arranged in an ascending configuration (like a theatre's tiered seats) toward the rear to provide a commanding view of the sights. Two more vehicles were constructed in the 1920s. All cars are currently preserved in museums.

The cars operated on a 10-mile (16 km) counter-clockwise circuit around the three peaks of Mount Royal via Bleury, Park, Laurier, Côte Ste. Catherine, Bellingham, Maplewood, Decelles, Queen Mary, a private right-of-way between Queen Mary and Côte Saint Luc, Girouard, Sherbrooke, Atwater, St. Luke, Closse, Sainte Catherine, then back to Bleury.

A second Golden Chariot route was established in the late 1940s. That followed a counter-clockwise route along Ste. Catherine, Delorimier, Mount Royal Avenue, Park, Laurier, Côte Ste. Catherine, Bellingham, Maplewood, Decelles, Queen Mary, Côte des Neiges, and back to Ste. Catherine. This second route lasted only a few years being discontinued when streetcar service ended on Côte des Neiges in 1955.

By 1956, the original and remaining Golden Chariot route had to be adjusted as streetcar trackage was reduced. When streetcar service ended on Sherbrooke and Ste. Catherine at the end of August 1956, cars were rerouted. Instead of turning east from Girouard to Sherbrooke, they continued south on Girouard to Upper Lachine Road, then Saint-Antoine to Bleury and Park. They last ran in regular service in the summer of 1957 although they could still be chartered in the summer of 1958. By then, however, the streetcar track network had shrunk even further.

Contrary to popular belief, the Golden Chariots never operated in regular service over Mount Royal, the small 764-foot-high (233 m) mountain that is the city's namesake. It was found that if passengers stood in some areas of the upper tiers of the Golden Chariots, there was not enough of a safety clearance in the tunnel on that line. Therefore, the company only used the Golden Chariots on the spectacular mountain right-of-way for occasional charter trips. The Mount Royal streetcar private right-of-way would later become the Camillien Houde Parkway for automobiles. Service was normally provided by the regular cars of the 11-Mountain route from the east, and the 93-Remembrance route from the west. Both routes met at Summit Loop near today's Beaver Lake (Lac des Castors) Pavilion where Remembrance Road and the Camillien Houde Parkway meet. The 93-Remembrance route was one of the shortest in the city, being only about three-quarters-mile (1.2 km) long from its western terminus at Remembrance and Côte des Neiges Roads. While the 93-Remembrance route was a relatively straight line to Summit Loop, the 11-Mountain route was far more challenging. The route up the east side of the mountain featured sharp curves, grades as steep as 10 percent and a 337-foot (103 m) tunnel. Motormen on this route were specially trained and strict safety procedures were used. The streetcars used on this route were equipped with an auxiliary braking system and powerful handbrakes in addition to their regular equipment. Both the 93-Remembrance and 11-Mountain routes were summer-only services.

There were a number of other unique cars on the system especially in the earlier years. The Montreal Street Railway, and later the Montreal Tramways Company, operated a smaller two-axle vehicle used as a rolling stage for the company's employee band. A prison car with no side windows was used to take miscreants between the downtown courthouse and the outlying Bordeaux Prison before roads were improved. The streetcar fleet also included two funeral cars, the second and larger of which saw heavy use during the influenza epidemic of 1918. They were used to carry caskets to the outlying Hawthorndale Cemetery, which was beyond the reach of good roads at the time. The funeral cars only carried caskets with the mourners having to take regular streetcars.

== Electric trolleybuses ==
Montreal also used trolleybuses. Introduced in 1937, they were seen as having some advantages over streetcars. Unlike streetcars, they could load and unload at the curb instead of stopping traffic in the middle of the street. They were still dependent on overhead trolley wires. Their passenger capacity was also less than the larger streetcars. Although all streetcar lines had been converted to buses by 1959, traffic congestion had not improved as hoped. City traffic engineers came up with a plan to turn many major streets into one-way thoroughfares, which would affect several trolley bus routes. Trolley buses by this time had fallen out of favour with transit companies, and new North American equipment was harder to get. Montreal's Brill trolley buses were quickly approaching the end of their economic service lives. As a result of all of these factors, the Commission decided to end trolley bus service in 1966. Two of the four trolley bus routes were converted to diesel buses in April while the last two trolley bus routes were converted to diesel buses in June. Montreal's new subway, the Metro, would open just four months later in October.

== Historic vehicles ==
=== Horsecars ===
In the early days, the Montreal City Passenger Railway used horse-drawn sleighs in the winter and horsecars in the summer. In the muddy seasons in between, omnibuses were used.

- Larivière - sleighs and omnibuses
- John Stephenson Company - horsecars

=== Electric cars ===
With the coming of electric cars in 1892, the Montreal Street Railway and later the Montreal Tramways Co began to buy a variety of electric car types:

- Single-ended, single-truck cars (SE-ST) from Brownell Car Company which supplied the first electric streetcar to Montreal
- Double-ended, single-truck cars (DE-ST) from J. G. Brill Company (Birney type)
- Single-ended, double-truck (SE-DT) cars from Kuhlman, Newburyport Car Manufacturing Company, Ottawa Car Company, and Canadian Car and Foundry (including PCC cars)

=== Trolley buses ===
In the 1930s, as streetcar lines were being converted to buses, some lines were converted to electric trolley buses. And order for seven AEC 664Ts was placed and, later, 80 of the model T-44 and 25 of the model T-44A were purchased from Canadian Car & Foundry.

== Recent history ==
In February 2006, Montreal mayor Gérald Tremblay suggested the city look into a return of the streetcar into the heart of the city, following a visit to Paris, where new service started in 1992.

In early 2012, the STM announced a plan to convert its entire fleet of buses over to all-electric by 2025. Beginning in 2012, all STM bus purchases will be either hybrids or electrics and, starting in 2011, Montreal will begin testing trolley buses (electric buses powered by overhead wires) on some of the city's busiest routes.

On March 31, 2014, the STM began testing a Chinese BYD prototype all-electric bus on several routes with a plan to have Novabus of St. Eustache, Quebec begin to trial its own version later the same year. The earlier plan to incorporate trolley busses using overhead wires was put on hold for further study.

== See also ==
- Quebec City tramway (1865–1948)
- List of Quebec railways
- List of street railways in Canada
- Rail transport in Canada
