= List of street railways in Canada =

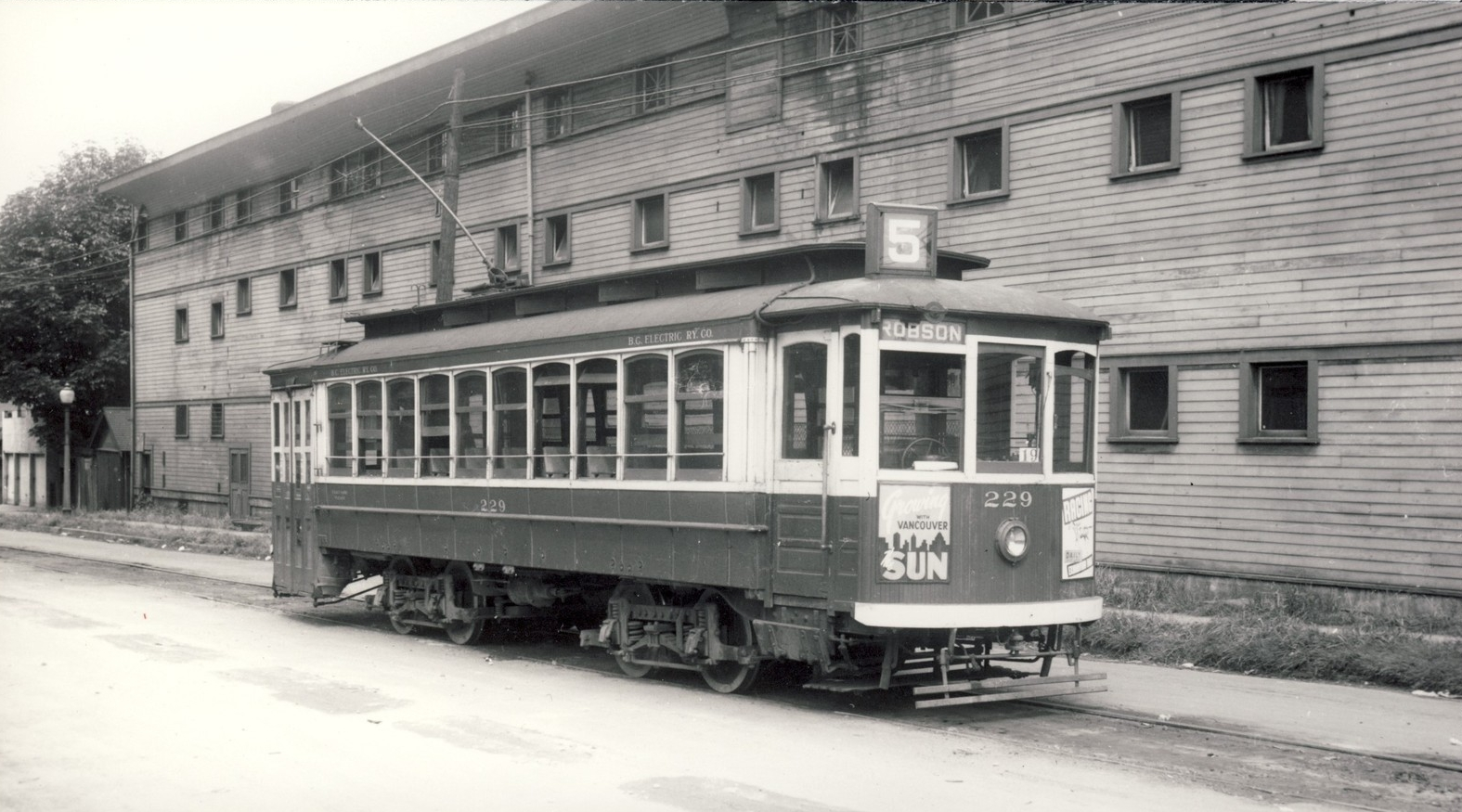
British Columbia Electric Railway streetcar no. 229, operating on route 5 Robson, 1948.

This is a list of street railways in Canada by province. Prince Edward Island, Northwest Territories and Nunavut are the only places in Canada to not have had any tram (streetcar) system. The list includes all streetcar systems, past and present.

== Alberta ==
Location	Name of System	Traction Type	Date (From)	Date (To)	Notes
Calgary	Calgary Municipal Railway	Electric	5 Jul 1909	29 Dec 1950	
Calgary	Heritage Park Historical Village	Electric	1975		Museum with operational heritage streetcar lines. Operates only during summer season. Streetcars was taken out of service in 2006 in preparation for the park's expansion, and returned to service in May 2010, taking passengers from the parking lot to the newly built CPR replica station and front gate.
Edmonton	Edmonton Radial Railway	Electric	30 Oct 1908	1 Sep 1951	
Edmonton	Edmonton Interurban Railway Company	Petrol (gasoline)	30 Sep 1913	1 Apr 1914	Connected Edmonton and St. Albert. Closed because of depot (carbarn) fire.
Edmonton	Edmonton Radial Railway Society - Fort Edmonton Park	Electric	1984		Operates in Fort Edmonton Park during park operating times.
Edmonton	Edmonton Radial Railway Society - High Level Bridge Streetcar	Electric	14 Jun 1997		Operates daily during summer season. Operates on the highest streetcar bridge in the world. Includes streetcar museum.
Lake Louise	Lake Louise Tramway	Petrol (gasoline)	1912	1930	Operated only during summer season (May-Sep).
Lethbridge	Lethbridge Municipal Railway	Electric	Sep 1912	8 Sep 1947	

== British Columbia ==
Location	Name of System	Traction Type	Date (From)	Date (To)	Notes
Nelson	Nelson Street Railway	Electric	27 Dec 1899 8 Nov 1910	27 April 1908 20 Jun 1949	Closed 1908 because of depot (carbarn) fire. Operation suspended 21 Dec 1910 - 21 Jun 1911. Ranked as the smallest town in the British Empire with a town tramway system. Heritage tramway opened 15 Jun 1992; see Nelson Electric Tramway.
Vancouver	British Columbia Electric Railway Company	Electric	28 Jun 1890	21 Apr 1955	Heritage tramway opened 29 Jul 1998; operated May – October; service suspended indefinitely in fall 2011 – see Vancouver Downtown Historic Railway.
New Westminster	British Columbia Electric Railway Company	Electric	7 Oct 1891	4 Dec 1938	
North Vancouver	British Columbia Electric Railway Company	Electric	1 Sep 1906	23 Apr 1947	
Victoria	British Columbia Electric Railway Company	Electric	22 Feb 1890	3 Jul 1948	

== Manitoba ==
Location	Name of System	Traction Type	Date (From)	Date (To)	Notes
Brandon	Brandon Municipal Railway	Electric	2 Jun 1913	30 Apr 1932	Operation suspended 15 Aug 1931 - 1 Oct 1931.
Winnipeg	Winnipeg Electric Company	Horse	20 Oct 1882	Jun 1894	
Winnipeg	Winnipeg Electric Company	Electric	27 Jan 1891	18 Sep 1955	

== New Brunswick ==
Location	Name of System	Traction Type	Date (From)	Date (To)	Notes
Moncton	Moncton Electric Street Railway, Heat and Power Company, Moncton Tramways, Electricity and Gas Company, Ltd.	Electric	11 Aug 1896 30 Nov 1911	11 Dec 1897 31 Dec 1931	
Saint John	Saint John Railway Co., New Brunswick Power Company	Horse	24 Aug 1869 17 Oct 1887	1876 May 1893	
Saint John	Saint John Railway Co., New Brunswick Power Company	Electric	12 Apr 1893	7 Aug 1948	
St. Stephen	Calais Street Railway Company				International tramway, see Calais, Maine, US.

== Newfoundland and Labrador ==
Location	Name of System	Traction Type	Date (From)	Date (To)	Notes
St. John's	St. John's Street Railway Company	Electric	1 May 1900	15 Sep 1948	

== Nova Scotia ==
Location	Name of System	Traction Type	Date (From)	Date (To)	Notes
Halifax	Nova Scotia Light and Power Company, Limited	Horse	11 Jun 1866 21 Oct 1886	17 May 1876 31 May 1896	
Halifax	Nova Scotia Light and Power Company, Limited	Electric	12 Feb 1896	29 Apr 1949	
New Glasgow - Trenton	Pictou County Electric Company	Electric	10 Oct 1904	7 May 1931	
Sydney	Cape Breton Electric Company	Electric	1901	Oct 1931	
? North Sydney	Cape Breton Electric Company	Electric	1903	1929	
? Glace Bay	Cape Breton Tramways Company, Ltd.	Electric	7 Jan 1908	1938	
? Sydney - Glace Bay	Cape Breton Tramways Company, Ltd.	Electric	Oct 1902	15 May 1947	
Yarmouth	Yarmouth Light and Power Company	Electric	26 Aug 1892	20 Oct 1928	

== Ontario ==
Location	Name of System	Traction Type	Date (From)	Date (To)	Notes
Belleville	Belleville Traction Company	Horse	1876-05-23	1891-11-26	Closed because of depot (carbarn) fire. (One source states that horse tramway operation continued to electrification in 1895.)
Belleville	Belleville Traction Company	Electric	1895-08-03	1901-09-12	
Brantford	Brantford Municipal Railway	Horse	1886-09-04	1893	
Brantford	Brantford Municipal Railway	Electric	1893-03-31 1933-01-09	1932-09-30 1940-01-31	
Chatham	Chatham Street Railway Company	Horse	1885 1891-06	1890-03-29 1895 (?)	
Cornwall	Cornwall Street Railway, Light and Power Company, Ltd	Electric	1896-07-07	1949-07-27	Used for freight under catenary until 9 October 1971
Guelph	Guelph Radial Railway Company	Electric	1895-09-17	1937-09-30	
Hamilton	Hamilton Street Railway	Horse	1874-05-15	1893	
Hamilton	Hamilton Street Railway	Electric	1892-07-02	1951-04-06	
Kingston	Kingston, Portsmouth and Cataraqui Electric Railway Company	Electric	1893-09-26	1930-03-04	Closed because of tramcar depot (carbarn) fire.
Kitchener and Waterloo	Berlin and Waterloo Street Railway	Horse	1889-06-13	1895	Converted to electric
Kitchener and Waterloo	Berlin and Waterloo Street Railway	Electric	1895-05-18	1923	Ownership transfer to Kitchener PUC
Kitchener and Waterloo	Berlin & Bridgeport Electric Street Railway Company 1902–1912;	Electric	1902	1923	Renamed Berlin & Northern Railway Company 1912, Waterloo Wellington Railway Company 1919; ownership transfer to Kitchener PUC 1923
Kitchener and Waterloo	Kitchener PUC Street Railway Department	Electric	1923	1946-12-27	Converted to bus, trolleybus
Kitchener and Waterloo	Ion rapid transit	Electric	2019-06-21		
London	London Street Railway	Horse	1875-05-24	1896-05	
London	London Street Railway	Electric	1895-09-12	1940-11-27	
Niagara Falls	Niagara, St. Catharines and Toronto Railway	Horse	1886-12-06	1900	
Niagara Falls	Niagara, St. Catharines and Toronto Railway	Electric	1900-08-15	1947-11-26	
Oshawa	Oshawa Railway Company	Electric	1895-06-13	1940-01-28	
Ottawa	Ottawa Electric Railway	Horse	1870-07-21	1891	
Ottawa	Ottawa Electric Railway	Electric	1891-06-29	1959-04-30	Trillium Line diesel light rail transit (DLRT), opened 15 Oct 2001.
Ottawa	Confederation Line	Electric	2019-09-14		Line 3 (O-Train) light rail transit to be opened 2027.
Peterborough	Peterborough Radial Railway Company	Electric	1893-08 1902	1898 1927-03-31	
St. Catharines	Niagara, St. Catharines and Toronto Railway	Horse	1879-11-01	1887	
St. Catharines	Niagara, St. Catharines and Toronto Railway	Electric	1887-09	1948-05-07	
St. Thomas	St. Thomas Municipal Railway	Horse	1879	1898	
St. Thomas	St. Thomas Municipal Railway	Electric	1898-06-16	1926-02-12	
Sarnia	Sarnia Street Railway Company	Horse	1875	1901	
Sarnia	Sarnia Street Railway Company	Electric	1901-01	1931-02-25	
Sault Ste. Marie	International Transit Company	Electric	1903-03-30	1941-11-01	
Temiskaming Shores	Temiskaming Streetcar Line	Electric	1910-04-30	1935-02-09	
Greater Sudbury	Sudbury and Copper Cliff Suburban Electric Railway Company	Electric	1915-11-11	1950-10-01	
Thunder Bay					Tramways in Fort William and Port Arthur closed prior to amalgamation.
? Fort William	Fort William Street Railway	Electric	1892-03-02	1948-02-15	First electric streetcar system in Canada
? Port Arthur	Port Arthur Civic Railway	Electric	1893-06-01	1948-10-16	
Toronto	Toronto streetcar system	Horse	1861-09-11	1894-08-31	
Toronto	Toronto streetcar system	Electric	1892-08-16	Present	
Waterloo					see Kitchener.
Welland	Niagara, Welland and Lake Erie Railway Company	Electric	1912-01	1930-07-04	
Windsor	Sandwich, Windsor and Amherstburg Railway Company	Horse	1874-07-20 1878-05	1877 1893	
Windsor	Sandwich, Windsor and Amherstburg Railway Company	Steam	1877 1888-04	1878-05 1888	
Windsor	Sandwich, Windsor and Amherstburg Railway Company	Electric	1886-06-06 1891-08-15	1888-04 1939-05-06	

== Quebec ==
Location	Name of System	Traction Type	Date (From)	Date (To)	Notes
East Broughton	Québec Asbestos Company	Electric (?)	ca. 1924 (?)	1942 (?)	Peschkes (Part Four, 1998, Page 25) states that, according to one source, Québec Asbestos Company operated a small town tramway network with three tramcars acquired second-hand from Sherbrooke. No other sources confirm this information.
Gatineau	Hull Electric Company	Electric	1895	6 Dec 1947	Tramway in Hull closed prior to amalgamation with neighboring towns.
Lévis	Levis Tramways Company	Electric	1903	23 Nov 1946	Operation suspended 1921 - 1922 because of depot (carbarn) fire.
Montréal	Montreal Tramways Company	Horse	27 Nov 1861	Oct 1894	Montreal City Passenger Railway became Montreal Street Railway Co in 1886
Montréal	Montreal Tramways Company	Electric	21 Sep 1892	30 Aug 1959	MSRy amalgamated with Montreal, Park and Island Railway (MSRy assumed control of that company in 1901) and Montreal Terminal Railway (MSRy assumed control of that company in 1907) to form Montreal Tramways Co in 1911. The company was purchased by the Montreal Transportation Commission in 1951.
Québec	Quebec Railway, Light and Power Company: Citadel Division	Horse	17 Aug 1865	1898	
Québec	Quebec Railway, Light and Power Company: Citadel Division	Electric	20 Jul 1897	25 May 1948	
Sherbrooke	Sherbrooke Railway and Power Company	Electric	1 Nov 1897	31 Dec 1931	
Trois-Rivières (Three Rivers)	Three Rivers Traction Company	Electric	11 Dec 1915	12 Sep 1933	

== Saskatchewan ==
Location	Name of System	Traction Type	Date (From)	Date (To)	Notes
Moose Jaw	Moose Jaw Electric Railway Company	Electric	4 Sep 1911	8 Oct 1932	
Regina	Regina Municipal Railway	Electric	28 Jul 1911	9 Sep 1950	
Saskatoon	Saskatoon Municipal Railway	Electric	1 Jan 1913	10 Nov 1951	

== Yukon ==
Location	Name of System	Traction Type	Date (From)	Date (To)	Notes
Whitehorse	Whitehorse trolley	Diesel	2000 2024	2018 present	Heritage tramway with one streetcar (from Lisbon, Portugal). Closed in 2018 due to lack of funding for track maintenance.

== See also ==
- List of town tramway systems in North America
- List of light-rail transit systems
- List of rapid transit systems
- List of trolleybus systems in Canada
- History of rail transport in Canada
- Urban rail transit in Canada
