= Riffel =

Riffel is a surname, and may refer to:

- Caspar Riffel (1807–1856), German historian
- James Riffel (born 1961), American film director and screenwriter
- Rena Riffel (born 1969), American actress
- Michael E. Riffel (born 1948) Artist, wood creations, fine art, and literature.

== See also ==
- Riffelsee, also Lake Riffel in Switzerland
- Michael A. Riffel High School, Catholic high school in Saskatchewan, Canada
- Reiffel surname page
