= Streetcar services in Peterborough, Ontario =

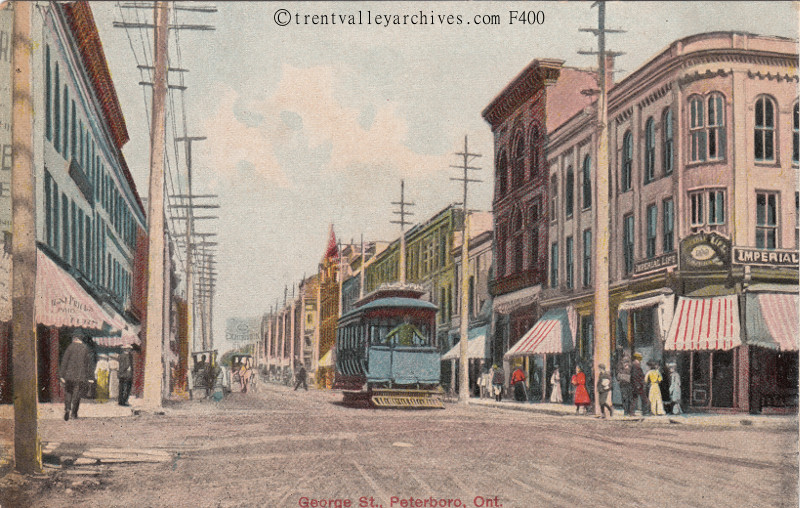
A Peterborough streetcar on George Street.

Two streetcar services operated in Peterborough Ontario in the late 19th century and early 20th century. The Peterborough and Ashburnham Street Railway Company operated from 1893 to 1898, and the Peterborough Radial Railway Company operated from 1902 until 1916. The Peterborough Radial Railway Company was given a 30-year franchise, but the city took back the system in 1916.

== Rolling stock ==
A streetcar manufacturer already existed in Peterborough, Edison Electric, renamed Canadian General Electric in 1892. This firm built the streetcars for the Peterborough and Ashburnham Street Railway.

== Routes ==
The company's first route ran north–south, from Auburn Mills to Lock Street, passing through the exhibition grounds for the Midland Central Fair. A second route ran along Charlotte Street.

Peterborough was the first city in Ontario to provide streetlights, and the streetcar system shared electrical power with the streetlight system.

== See also ==
- Peterborough Transit
- List of street railways in Canada
