= Regina Municipal Railway =

Streetcar system in Saskatchewan, Canada

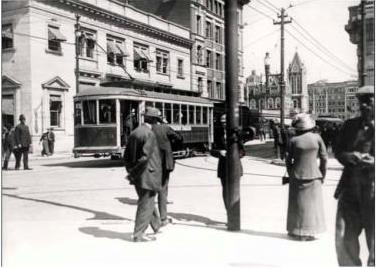
Regina streetcar in 1911, on 11th Avenue near Scarth Street.

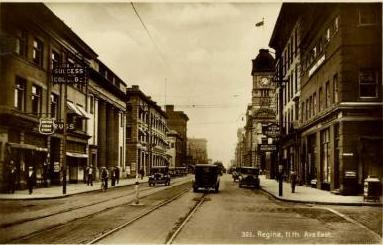
Regina streetcar tracks in 1911 on 11th Avenue near Cornwall Street.

The city of Regina, Saskatchewan, operated a streetcar system, the Regina Municipal Railway, from 1911 to 1950.

When introduced in 1911 four vehicles ran on a 10-kilometre (6.2 mi) route on 11th Street. By 1913 the system had been expanded its fleet to 34 vehicles, and had added new routes on almost 30 kilometres (19 mi) of track. Non-passenger vehicles used system to deliver coal and pick up trash.

Alan Artibise, in a chapter of Shaping the Urban Landscape: Aspects of the Canadian City-Building Process, described developers convincing the city to build streetcars routes "well past the limites of heavy settlement where little and often no housing existed."

Thirty kilometres (19 mi) of track was to be the systems' largest extent. Regina shrank during World War I. By 1920 fares had doubled from five cents to ten cents. The city was able to drop fares back down to five cents during the depression, but by 1931 only 20 kilometres of track remained in use.

In 1931 buses began to supplement the streetcar operations.

Usage increased again during World War II when gasoline was rationed.

A serious fire in the system's carhouse destroyed many of the system's vehicles in 1949, and the system was shut down a year later in 1950.

== See also ==
- List of street railways in Canada
- History of rail transport in Canada
- Public transport in Canada
