= Peterborough Transit =

Public transport operator

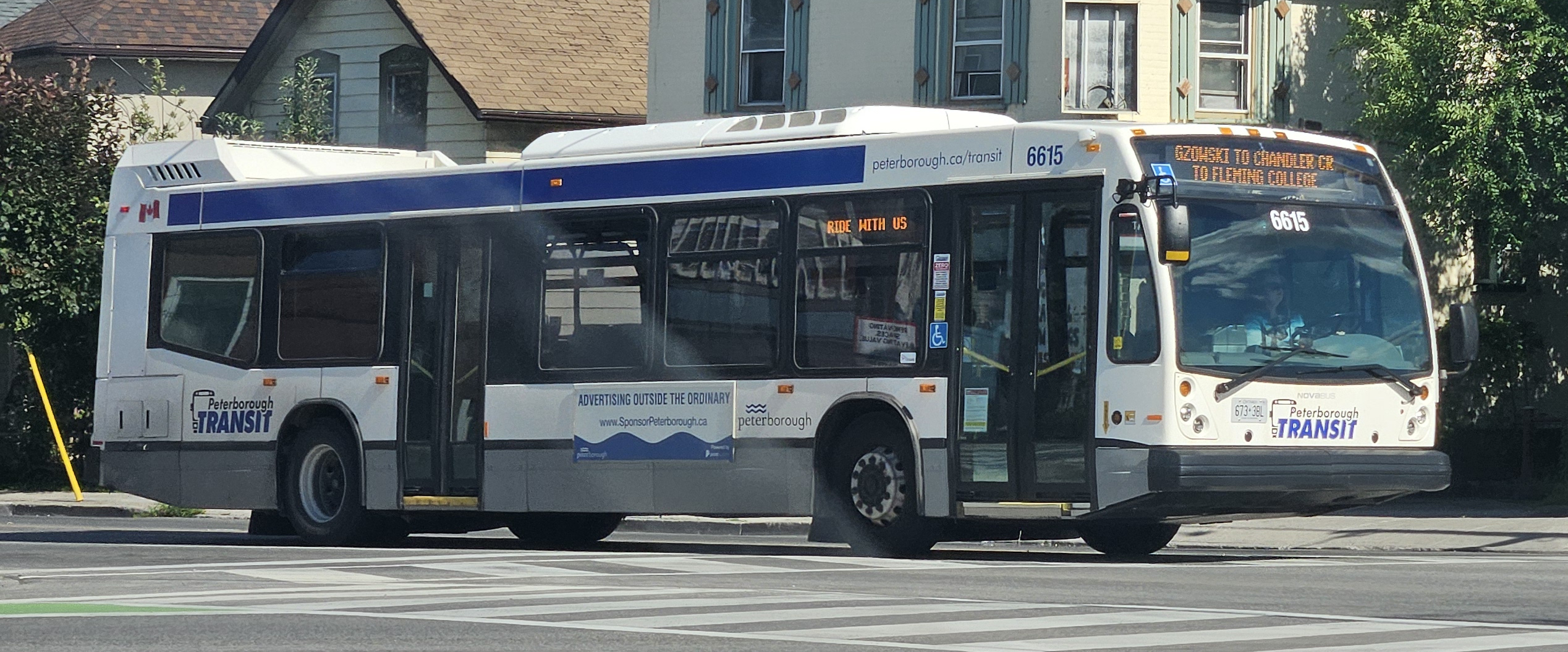
- Founded: 1978 (Originally 1893)
- Headquarters: 190 Simcoe Street, Peterborough, Ontario K9H 2H6
- Locale: Peterborough, Selwyn
- Service area: Urban area
- Service type: Public Transit, Paratransit
- Routes: 11 Main Routes 2 Community Bus Routes 2 Selwyn "The Link" Routes 1 GO Transit Route
- Hubs: Peterborough Terminal, Lansdowne Place, Trent University, Fleming College, & Peterborough Regional Health Center
- Fleet: 63 buses
- Fuel type: Diesel
- Operator: City of Peterborough
- Website: Peterborough Transit Official Site Selwyn "The Link" Official Website

Peterborough Transit is the public transport operator for the City of Peterborough and Township of Selwyn.

The majority of their system consists of ten main routes within the urban area of Peterborough. There are three community bus routes that serve businesses and seniors homes. There are two Selwyn "The Link" routes that connects the towns of Curve Lake, Lakefield, Ennismore, & Bridgenorth to Trent University. For those who are physically unable to use the regular transit bus, there is a special Handi-Van paratransit service.

== History ==
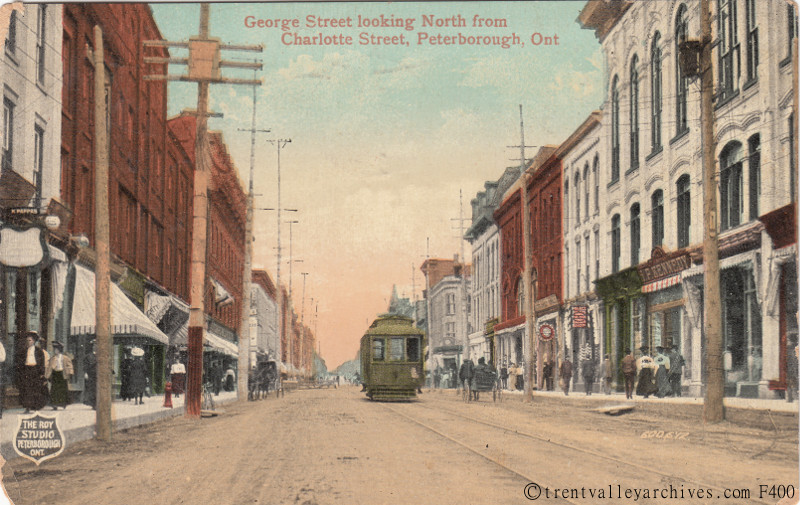
A Streetcar on George Street.

Transit began in Peterborough as a streetcar service with the Peterborough and Ashburnham Street Railway Company, which was established in 1893 and operated until 1898. This was followed by the Peterborough Radial Railway Company, which operated from 1902 until 1927. This ended the streetcar era in Peterborough.

Cooney and Joplin was briefly the only transit company in the city during 1927 after the Peterborough Radial Railway Company ceased operations. Later in 1927, Border Transit Limited started. It operated until 1978 at which point the present day Peterborough Transit began operations and continues today.

In June 2020, Peterborough transit route system change from a hub-style transit system to a grid-style transit system due to the COVID-19 pandemic. As a result, there was nine main routes (down from the original 12 routes) and three community bus routes (up from the original 1 route).

In May 2021, Peterborough County and Peterborough Transit introduced Selwyn "The Link" bus network. The network connects Curve Lake, Bridgenorth, Lakefield, and Ennismore to Trent U Bata.

In September 2021, Route 11 Water became the 10th route in the transit system.

Starting on January 2, 2022, all kids 12 years and under will be able to ride the transit system for free as part of a pilot project. The pilot project is expected to run through 2022.

== Service ==
=== Routes ===
There are ten main routes, three community bus routes, two Selwyn "the link" bus routes and a paratransit service. GO Transit also operates one bus from Peterborough to Oshawa.

Routes 2 - 9 operate seven days a week, routes 10 & 12 operate weekday service only, and route 11 operates on Weekdays between September and April. All routes followed by an A or B are shorter, less frequent branch routes (excluding 7A). Community bus routes 22 & 23 connect to major plazas, malls, grocery stores, retirement and long-term care homes, medical clinics, and a hospital within the City of Peterborough.

No.	Route	Destinations				Notes
2	Chemong	NB	To: Trent U Bata	SB	To: Lansdowne Place @ Borden Ave	Via: Traill College; Peterborough Terminal
2A	Chemong	NB	To: Trent U Bata	SB	To: Peterborough Terminal	Via: Traill College
2B	Chemong	NB	To: Peterborough Terminal	SB	To: Lansdowne Place @ Borden Ave	
3	Park North	NB	To: Trent U Bata	SB	To: Clonsilla Ave @ Summit Plaza	
4	Weller	WB	To: Woodglade Blvd @ Lilico Cres	EB	To: Peterborough Museum	Via: Peterborough Regional Health Centre (Eastbound Only); Peterborough Terminal
4A	Weller	WB	To: Peterborough Terminal	EB	To: Peterborough Museum	
5	The Parkway	NB	To: Peterborough Terminal	SB	To: Fleming College	Via: Shorelines Casino
6	Sherbrooke	WB	To: Fleming College	EB	To: Trent U Bata	Via: Peterborough Terminal; Adam Scott CVI
6B	Sherbrooke	NB	To: Trent U Bata	SB	To: Peterborough Terminal	Via: Adam Scott CVI
7	Lansdowne (Winter)	WB	To: Fleming College	EB	To: Trent U Gzowski	Via: Holy Cross SS; Willowcreek Plaza; Rogers St / Maria St; Thomas A Stewart SS
7A	Lansdowne (Summer)	WB	To: Fleming College	EB	To: Trent U Gzowski	Via: Holy Cross SS; Willowcreek Plaza; Hunter St E / Ashburnham Dr; Thomas A Stewart SS
8	Monaghan	NB	To: Trent U Bata	SB	To: Fleming College	Via: St. Peter's SS; Peterborough Regional Health Center; Lansdowne Place; Kenner CVI
9	Parkhill	WB	To: Fleming College	EB	To: Trent U Gzowski	Via: Thomas A Stewart SS; Crestwood SS
10	Technology Drive	NB	To: Peterborough Terminal	SB	To: Technology Dr @ O'Brien Dr	Limited Weekday Service Only: Route Discontinued September 2026
11	Water	NB	To: Trent U Bata	SB	To: Peterborough Terminal	Bypasses: Traill College
11A	Water	NB	To: Trent U Bata	SB	To: Traill College	Bypasses: Peterborough Terminal
12	Otonabee	NB	To: Peterborough Terminal	SB	To: Otonabee Dr @ Milford Gate	Weekday Service Only: Route Discontinued September 2026
14	O'Tech Connect (Otonabee-Technology)	WB	To: Peterborough Terminal via Otonabee Drive	EB	To Willowcreek Plaza via Technology Drive	Route Introduced September 2026; Replaces Route 10 & 12
22	Blue (Community)	Terminus	To: Lansdowne Place @ Real Canadian Superstore	Midpoint	To: Peterborough Terminal	
23	Red (Community)	Terminus	To: Walmart North Superstore	Midpoint	To: Hedonics Circle	Serves: Peterborough Terminal

=== Late Night Service ===
Late-night service runs until 3:00 AM Monday to Saturday, and 1:00 AM on Sundays (September to April only).

No.	Name	Destination			Notes
5A	The Parkway	NB	From: Fleming College	To: Peterborough Terminal	Via: Crawford Dr @ Harper Rd (Park & Ride) Becomes Route 6C @ Peterborough Terminal
6	Sherbrooke	WB	From: Trent U Bata	To: Fleming College	Via: Peterborough Terminal Becomes Route 5A @ Fleming College
6C	Sherbrooke	NB	From: Peterborough Terminal	To: Trent U Bata	Via: Trent U Gzowski College Becomes Route 6 @ Trent U Bata Library

=== Selwyn "The Link" Bus Routes ===
Operates in Selwyn Township, ON

No.	Destinations				Notes
31	NB	To: Curve Lake	SB	To: Trent U Bata	Via: Lakefield
33	WB	To: Bridgenorth Public Library	EB	To: Trent U Bata	Via: Lakefield

=== GO Transit Routes ===
No.	Destinations				Notes
88 / 88B	NB	To: Trent U Gzowski	SB	To: Durham College Oshawa Go	Via: Peterborough Terminal Crawford Dr @ Harper Rd Park & Ride Ptbo County Rd. 10 @ Hwy 115 Park & Ride
88C	NB	To: Trent U Gzowski	SB	To: Durham College Oshawa Go	Via: Peterborough Terminal

=== Peterborough Bus Terminal ===
Peterborough Bus Terminal
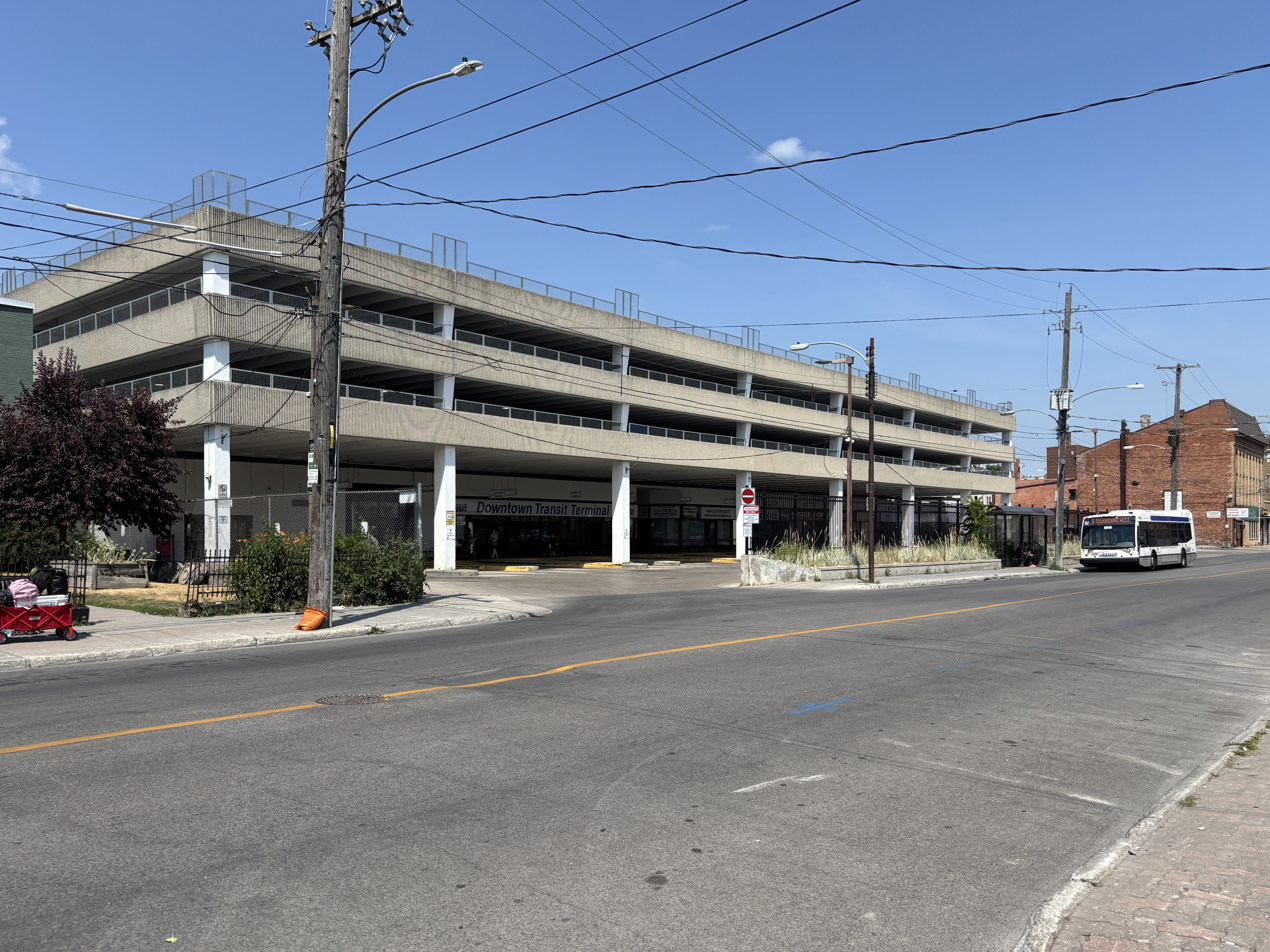

General information
- Location: 190 Simcoe Street, Peterborough, Ontario
- Coordinates: 44°18′18″N 78°19′18″W
- Owner: City of Peterborough
- Bus operators: Peterborough Transit; GO Transit

Other information
- Station code: GO Transit: PETB
- Fare zone: 30
Location

== Fares ==
Listed below are the fares for Peterborough Transit. Kids 12 years or younger ride free.

Peterborough Transit Fare Type:	Cost:
Single Ride (Cash or Pass)	$3.50
Trans-Cab	$4.25
Transfer (Valid for 90 Minutes)	$0.00
Two Ride Pass	$7.00
Day Pass (covers two adults)	$13.00
Ten Ride Pass	$32.00
30 Day Adult Pass	$83.00
30 Day Student (to Grade 12) Pass	$77.00
30 Day Senior (65+) Pass	$58.00
Semi-Annual Senior (65+) Pass (January - June)	$180.00
Semi-Annual Senior (65+) Pass (July - December)	$195.00
Annual Senior Pass	$325.00
Selwyn "The Link" Fare Type:	Cost:
Single Ride (Cash)	$8.00
Two Ride Pass	$15.00
Ten Ride Pass	$50.00
30 Day Pass	$150.00

== Criticisms ==
Many Peterborough Transit riders have criticized buses for being repeatedly late. Since 2005, Peterborough Transit has been slowly implementing changes to improve bus schedules. In 2006, buses began running every 40 minutes, rather than every 30 minutes, since buses would often run every 35–45 minutes anyway. This way, buses could at least meet their schedules.

Peterborough Transit is also frequently criticized for not having buses run late enough. During weekdays, the last bus departs from the terminal at 10:40 pm, even though many riders need buses until 1:00 am. It was also criticized for not offering Sunday service, a problem that was fixed in 2006.

The mayor, Daryl Bennett, owner of Capitol Taxi, proposed changes that would result in the cancellation of Saturday service after 6:00 pm. However, on January 31, 2011. Peterborough city council voted against these transit cuts because of the overwhelming number of complaints from residents, and due to the perceived conflict of interest for the mayor.

The buses being required to reverse out of the bays at the existing terminal waste roughly 10 minutes before all buses can start their trips. This can cause buses to end up running behind schedule later on in the day, as the arrival/depart time at the terminal generally falls further and further behind the more trips that are made.

Attempts to implement a Community Bus route by merging the Trent East Bank and the Nicholls Park route failed, mainly due to overcrowding issues on the route (renamed to 'Trent Armour'). As a result, the East Bank and Nicholls Park route returned and the Trent Reid and Trent Armour were cancelled.

== See also ==
- Public transport in Canada
