= Railway Guarantee Act (Province of Canada) =

Canadian rail transport law

The Railway Guarantee Act was introduced in 1849 in the Parliament of the Province of Canada by Finance Minister Francis Hincks, who was also the President of the Great Western Railway of Canada. The Act encountered little opposition during the course of its passage, despite the prevailing depression.

It empowered the Government to guarantee the interest on loans to be raised by any railway chartered by the Legislature for the construction of any line at least 75 miles long within the Province, provided that:

- the rate of interest guaranteed did not exceed 6%
- the sum on which the interest was guaranteed did not exceed the amount expended before the guarantee was given, and should be sufficient to complete the construction in a fitting manner (provided that no such guarantee would be given until at least half the line was completed)
- the payment of the interest guaranteed would be the first charge on the tolls and profits of the company
- no dividend could be declared so long as any part of the interest remained unpaid
- so long as any of the principal on which interest was guaranteed remained unpaid, no dividend could be declared to the stockholders until an amount equal to 3% of the principal was paid into a sinking fund to be managed by the Province and used for the eventual redemption of the bonds
- the Province held the first charge upon the road, tolls and profits of the company for any sum paid or guaranteed

The Province could demand further conditions with respect to a specific guarantee.

Provision was also made for financial support to be given to plans being discussed for the construction of the future Intercolonial Railway.

In 1851, access to guarantees was restricted to the Main Trunk Line (later to be called Grand Trunk Railway), together with ones already granted to the St. Lawrence and Atlantic Railroad, the Great Western Railway and the Ontario, Simcoe and Huron Railway.

== See also ==
- History of rail transport in Canada
