= Paul Reiffel =

Australian cricketer and umpire

Personal information
- Full name: Paul Ronald Reiffel
- Born: 19 April 1966 (age 60); Box Hill, Victoria, Australia
- Nickname: Pistol
- Height: 187 cm (6 ft 2 in)
- Batting: Right-handed
- Bowling: Right-arm fast-medium
- Role: All rounder, umpire

International information
- National side: Australia (1992–1999)
- Test debut (cap 352): 1 February 1992 v India
- Last Test: 6 March 1998 v India
- ODI debut (cap 108): 14 January 1992 v India
- Last ODI: 20 June 1999 v Pakistan
- ODI shirt no.: 4

Domestic team information
- Years: Team
- 1987/88–2001/02: Victoria
- 2000: Nottinghamshire

Umpiring information
- Tests umpired: 78 (2012–2025)
- ODIs umpired: 98 (2009–2025)
- T20Is umpired: 38 (2009–2026)
- WTests umpired: 1 (2008)
- WODIs umpired: 3 (2004–2011)
- WT20Is umpired: 7 (2012–2014)

Career statistics
Competition	Test	ODI	FC	LA
Matches	35	92	168	158
Runs scored	955	503	3,690	882
Batting average	26.52	13.97	24.76	14.00
100s/50s	0/6	0/1	0/18	0/1
Top score	79*	58	86	58
Balls bowled	6,403	4,732	32,772	7830
Wickets	104	106	545	166
Bowling average	26.96	29.20	26.40	31.04
5 wickets in innings	5	0	16	0
10 wickets in match	0	0	2	0
Best bowling	6/71	4/13	6/57	4/13
Catches/stumpings	15/–	25/–	77/–	44/–
Medal record
Men's Cricket
Representing Australia
ICC Cricket World Cup
Winner	1999 England-Wales -Ireland-Scotland-Netherlands
Runner-up	1996 India-Pakistan-Sri Lanka
- Source: ESPNcricinfo, 24 November 2023

Paul Ronald Reiffel (born 19 April 1966) is an Australian cricket umpire and former cricketer who played in 35 Tests and 92 One Day Internationals (ODIs) from 1992 to 1999. He was part of Australia's victorious 1999 World Cup team. After retirement, he became a first-class cricket umpire. He is currently a member of the Elite Panel of ICC Umpires.

== Playing career ==
Reiffel's career best bowling figures of 6/71 came at Edgbaston in 1993. Throughout his career he took 104 wickets at 26.96 in 35 Tests, taking 5 or more wickets in an innings five times. An accurate bowler whose main attacking weapon was seam bowling, Reiffel was a more than handy batsman. While limited in his shotmaking ability, he had a solid defence. Two notable achievements in his Australian playing career were being members of the winning 1999 Cricket World Cup ODI team and the test team that defeated the West Indies during the 1994/95 Frank Worrell Trophy series. Reiffel was a Victorian cricket captain who once declared a Victorian innings closed in 2001 with Michael Klinger on 99 not out.

== Umpiring career ==
Reiffel made his first class umpiring debut in the 2004/2005 season after first umpiring in Melbourne grade cricket in 2002. Reiffel joined the Cricket Australia National Umpire's Panel in the 2005/2006 season. In 2008, he became a member of the International Cricket Council International Panel of ICC Umpires, the first former Australian Test cricketer to do so. He made his international on-field umpiring debut in a One Day International match between Australia and New Zealand on 6 February 2009. He also umpired in both Tests of the West Indies-New Zealand Test Series in July–August 2012.

In June 2013, Reiffel was elevated to the Elite Panel of ICC Umpires. He was selected as one of the twenty umpires to stand in matches during the 2015 Cricket World Cup.

On the first day of the fourth Test between India and England at the Wankhede Stadium in Mumbai, Reiffel was hit on the head by a throw from fielder Bhuvneshwar Kumar. He left the field and underwent precautionary tests, which showed that he had not suffered any major injuries. The International Cricket Council, however, decided against Reiffel taking any further part in the match. He was replaced by Marais Erasmus who was originally the third umpire.

In April 2019, he was named as one of the sixteen umpires to stand in matches during the 2019 Cricket World Cup. In September 2023, he was named as one of the sixteen match officials for 2023 Cricket World Cup.

During the two year COVID-19 moratorium on matches requiring dual neutral umpires, Reiffel was able to stand for the first time in a match involving Australia after having previously operated as a TV umpire much earlier in his career. His first match as a centre umpire was Australia vs India in Adelaide in December 2020. He also stood for 3 tests of the 2021–22 Ashes series including the Boxing Day test in his native Victoria, and performed TV umpire duties in the other two matches. His last game involving Australia was a pair of tests between Australia & South Africa in 2022-23.

In 2024 he reached a total of 100 matches umpired either in the middle or as TV umpire and cemented his place as a top tier official that was a preferred choice for the most important test series. These included series involving England & India in both nations as well as series in South Africa, and as the TV umpire for the Irish Cricket Team's first ever Test match victory.

== Family ==
Reiffel's father, Ron Reiffel, played for the Richmond Football Club. His grandfather, Lou Reiffel, was also an Australian rules footballer and played for both Melbourne and South Melbourne.

Following the death of his father in December 2018, Reiffel pulled out of officiating during Sri Lanka's tour of New Zealand the following month.

== See also ==
- List of Test cricket umpires
- List of One Day International cricket umpires
- List of Twenty20 International cricket umpires
