= Newburyport Car Manufacturing Company =

American streetcar manufacturer

Newburyport Car Manufacturing Company was a street car builder in Newburyport, Massachusetts from 1887 to 1905. Business began with horsecars, but the company folded due to the introduction of electric street cars.

== Products ==
- SE DT streetcar

== Clients ==
- Montreal Street Railway Company
