= Lou Reiffel =

Australian rules footballer

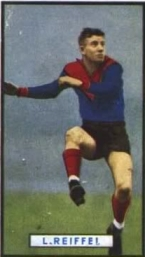

Personal information
- Full name: Guy Lindsay Lewis Reiffel
- Born: 5 November 1910; Ballarat East, Victoria
- Died: 16 November 1977 (aged 67); Prahran, Victoria
- Original team: Ballarat Imperials
- Height: 170 cm (5 ft 7 in)
- Weight: 60 kg (132 lb)
- Position: Forward

Playing career^{1}
Years	Club	Games (Goals)
1936–1939	Melbourne	35 (73)
1939–1941	South Melbourne	29 (55)
Total		64 (128)
- ^{1} Playing statistics correct to the end of 1941.

Guy Lindsay Lewis "Lou" Reiffel (5 November 1910 – 16 November 1977) was an Australian rules footballer who played with Melbourne and South Melbourne in the Victorian Football League (VFL).

Reiffel played in two premierships for Ballarat Imperials in 1929 and 1935 and also won the 1935 Ballarat Football League's goalkicking award with 81 goals before he started his VFL career in 1936 as a 25-year-old. He kicked at least one goal in all of his 16 appearances in 1936, including two finals, finishing with 31 goals. The following season, in round 16, he kicked a career-best eight goals against Collingwood.

During the 1939 VFL season Reiffel decided to switch clubs, costing him a chance of playing in Melbourne's premiership win that year. He spent three seasons with South Melbourne and was their leading goal-kicker in 1940 with 33 goals.

He was the father of Richmond player Ron Reiffel and grandfather of Australian Test cricketer and umpire Paul Reiffel.
