= Larivière =

Larivière (N. et A. C. Larivière) was a sleigh and omnibus builder in Montreal, Quebec, Canada providing vehicles for affluent clients in Montreal and early transit operators.

The company was founded by brothers Noel and Adolphe Clément Larivière began operations sometime in 1850 manufacturing horse carriages and by the end of the 19th century electric streetcars. The company began to decline around 1890s and finally disappeared around 1903.

== Facilities ==
The company had two manufacturing facilities in its lifetime:

- 5 Wolfe Street
- 74 rue St. Antoine

== Products and Clients ==
- Omnibus - Montreal City Passenger Railway
- Sleigh - Montreal City Passenger Railway
- double truck double end electric streetcar - Bridgeport and Berlin Electric Street Railway
- single truck sweeper 1905 - built 1897 for Montreal Street Railway and sold to Cornwall Street Railway
- single truck sweeper 1905 - built 1897 for Montreal Park and Island Railway and sold to Cornwall
- electric streetcars - St. John's, Newfoundland
- double truck railcars - London Street Railway (London, Ontario)
- single truck electric streetcars - Montreal street railway companies
