= Ron Reiffel =

Australian rules footballer (1932–2018)

Personal information
- Full name: Ron Reiffel
- Born: 15 March 1932
- Died: 30 December 2018 (aged 86)
- Height: 175 cm (5 ft 9 in)
- Weight: 73 kg (161 lb)

Playing career^{1}
Years	Club	Games (Goals)
1951–1952	Richmond	6 (0)
- ^{1} Playing statistics correct to the end of 1952.

Ron Reiffel (15 March 1932 – 30 December 2018) was an Australian rules footballer who played with Richmond in the Victorian Football League (VFL).

Reiffel made six appearances for Richmond, three in 1951 and another three in the 1952 VFL season.

He was the son of Melbourne and South Melbourne player Lou Reiffel. His own son, Paul Reiffel, is an Australian cricket umpire and former Test cricketer. A granddaughter, Sarah Ashmore, plays netball with the Melbourne Phoenix.

Reiffel was the curator of the Richmond Football Club Museum.
