= Transit Museum Society =

Restoration and preservation group

- Abbreviation: TMS
- Formation: 1986
- Type: Nonprofit
- Legal status: Active
- Purpose: Restoring, preserving, and operating vintage vehicles in British Columbia.
- Headquarters: Langley, British Columbia, Canada
- Region served: British Columbia
- President: Bryan Larrabee
- Website: https://transitmuseumsociety.org/

The Transit Museum Society of British Columbia (TMS) is a non-profit society formed in 1986. Based in Langley, they focus on the restoration and preservation of decommissioned transit vehicles in Vancouver and adjoining regions. The Society currently has a fleet of seventeen vehicles, fifteen of which are operational and two non-operational. These vehicles were previously in use by both public and private operating companies between 1937 and 2021. Some include trolley buses from the Vancouver trolley bus system.

Volunteers from the Society also operated the Vancouver Downtown Historic Railway and carried out restoration and maintenance of the historic electric interurban cars used on that line until its operation was suspended in 2012.

== Fleet ==
=== Railcars ===
See Vancouver Downtown Historic Railway.

=== Buses ===
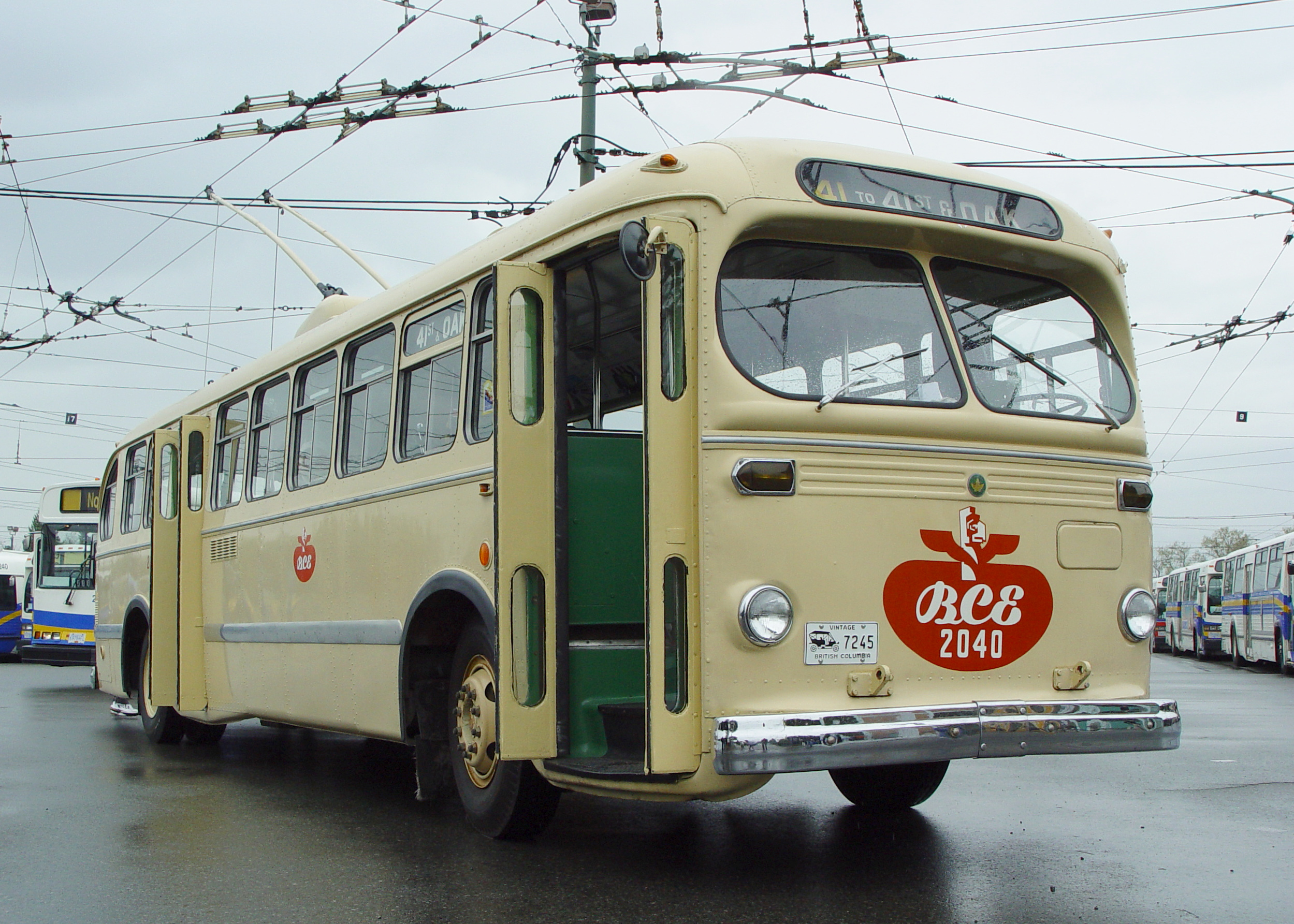
CCF-Brill T44 #2040 (2008)

- 1937 Hayes "Teardrop" Model PCT-32, Pacific Stage Lines #63. Oldest operational bus in B.C. and last operational Hayes bus in the world. Served as a canteen for the Vancouver Fire department from the mid-1950s until 1984. Restored to original Pacific Stage Lines specifications and donated to the Transit Museum Society in 1986.
- 1947 Canadian Car-Brill Model T-44 trolley coach, B. C. Electric #2040. One of the first trolleybuses for Vancouver to replace streetcar lines starting in 1948. The last of these vehicles were retired by BC Hydro & Power Authority in 1976. Was part of the BC Transportation Museum's collection until its closure in the late 1980s; subsequently donated to the Transit Museum Society.
- 1947 Fageol Twin Coach Model 41S, B. C. Electric. #M852 . Bought by BC Electric to assist with the “rails to rubber” conversion starting in 1947.
- 1954 Canadian Car-Brill Model T-48A trolley coach, B.C. Hydro #2416. One of the last Brill trolleybuses purchased for Vancouver by BC Electric.
- 1957 Canadian Car-Brill Model CD-52-TC, BC Hydro #3404. Primarily used on the Macdonald / Knight Route. Later in 1977, the CD52A buses were repainted and used as “Shopper” buses that ran between shopping centers in Vancouver and later in Victoria.
- 1957 Canadian Car-Brill CD-52-TC, BC Electric #3405. Primarily used on the Macdonald / Knight Route. Later in 1977, the CD52A buses were repainted and used as “Shopper” buses that ran between shopping centers in Vancouver and later in Victoria.
- 1957 General Motors TDH-4512 BC Electric #730. Originally Purchased for Victoria by BC Electric. Later served Mission, Powell River, and other small communities in B.C. Retired from service from Prince George in 1986 as BC Transit #642, displayed at Expo 86 unrestored. Restored externally and converted to a mobile exhibit bus in 1989 for BC Transit's 1990 Centennial Celebration. Interior was renovated between late 2018 and mid-2019, as well as mid-2026.
  1964 General Motors TDH-4519, BC Hydro #4612 (2026)
  1964 General Motors TDH-4519, BC Hydro #4612. One of the first GM New Look buses purchased by BC Hydro for Vancouver.
- 1976 Flyer Industries E800, BC Transit V1109, "trisel" (ex-trolleybus 2649. Converted to diesel for purpose of de-icing trolley wires); repainted back to "Metro Transit" yellow-and-orange-stripe livery and renumbered back to 2649 in June 2012.
- 1982 Flyer Industries D901A, BC Transit 3334. 35 of these buses were purchased along with the similar E901A trolleybuses. Some of these buses lasted into the new millennium.
- 1982 General Motors T6H-5307N, New Look type. "Fishbowl" Hillclimber, BC Transit P4107. One of the first buses for Vancouver with turbocharged 6V92TA engines which were used often for climbing up Burnaby Mountain to Simon Fraser University. Being converted into a rolling museum to replace 730 as the primary display bus.
- 1990 Motor Coach Industries TC40102N "Classic," Coast Mountain Bus Company S4276. Originally purchased for interurban service from Downtown Vancouver to White Rock, Tsawwassen and Ladner. Features soft, front-facing seating and overhead reading lights.
- 1991 New Flyer D40 "Suburban," Coast Mountain Bus Company V3106. Originally purchased for interurban service from Downtown Vancouver to White Rock, Tsawwassen and Ladner. Features soft, front-facing seating and reading lights.
- 1996 New Flyer Industries D40LF, BC Transit 9753. Part of the first low floor bus orders for Vancouver; originally numbered 7183. Decommissioned by Coast Mountain Bus Company in November 2013. Repurchased by BC Transit in January 2014 and renumbered 9753. Operated as a spare bus in the Central Fraser Valley, Kamloops, Nanaimo, Victoria and Whistler prior to its retirement in early 2021.

=== Non-operational vehicles ===
- 1959 General Motors Model TDH-4512, BC Transit #678. Originally Purchased for Victoria by BC Electric as #740. Later served Mission, Powell River, and other small communities in B.C. Retired from service from Prince George in 1986. It was sold to a private owner and later came into the possession of 911 Filmcars, a New Westminster supplier of buses and emergency vehicles for use in film, in the early 2000s. In December 2018, 911 Filmcars donated the bus to the Society. The bus was evaluated for structural integrity and mechanical condition and has been deemed satisfactory.
- 1983 Flyer Industries E902 trolleybus, BC Transit 2805 (converted into a stationery office due to metal thieves stripping of copper wiring and propulsion components).

=== Sold/disposed vehicles ===
- 1927 Hayes "long nose"
- 1946 Fageol Twin Coach 34S, BC Electric M-328 (Donated to Yakima Electric Railway Museum)
- 1947 Canadian Car IC-41, Pacific Stage Lines 6228 (acquired with intention to restore, sold for parts following discovery of extensive frame damage)
- 1951 Canadian Car Brill T-48A BC Electric/BC Hydro/BC Transit 2341 trolley coach (Sold to private owner)
- 1954 Canadian Car Brill T-48A MTOC 2414 trolley coach (Sold to private owner)
- 1954 Canadian Car Brill T-48A trolley coach 2401, 2404, and 24?? (Sold or scrapped)
- 1954 REO heavy-duty tow truck, BC Electric/BC Hydro/Metro Transit Operating Company finishing (Sold to private owner/museum for restoration)
- 1982 General Motors/BBC HR150G "Fishbowl" trolley bus, Edmonton Transit System 132 (salvaged for parts and scrapped in April 2022)

== Plans ==
In the future, the Society plans to acquire additional vehicles representing types that served in public transit across the province. These may include a New Flyer low-floor trolleybus.
