= Trolley buses in Hamilton =

Electric transit system formerly serving Hamilton, Ontario

Hamilton trolley bus system
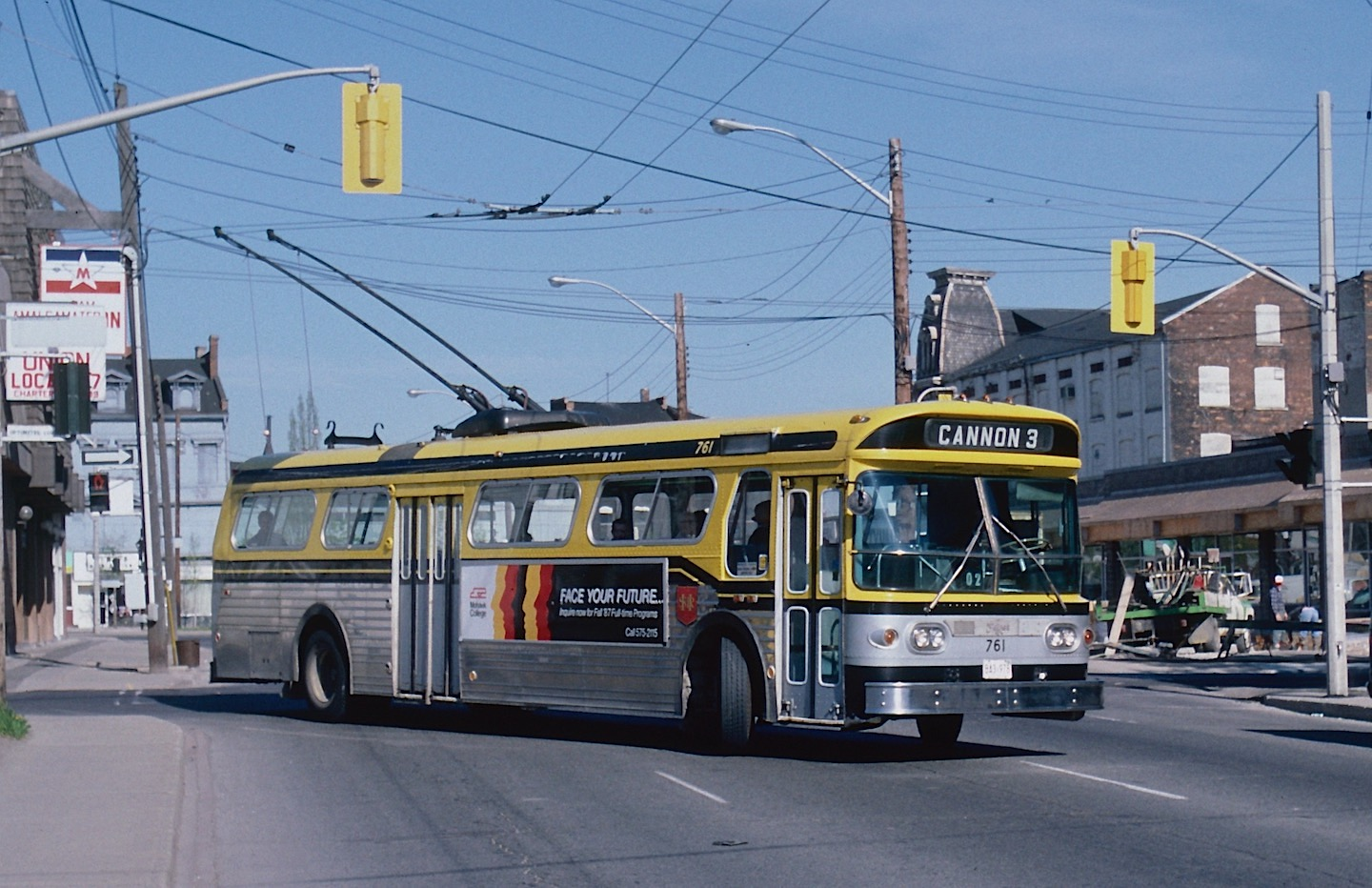
- A Flyer E700A trolley bus on route 3

Operation
- Locale: Hamilton, Ontario, Canada
- Open: December 10, 1950
- Close: December 30, 1992
- Routes: 3
- Operator: Hamilton Street Railway

Infrastructure
- Electrification: 600 V DC

Statistics
Overview
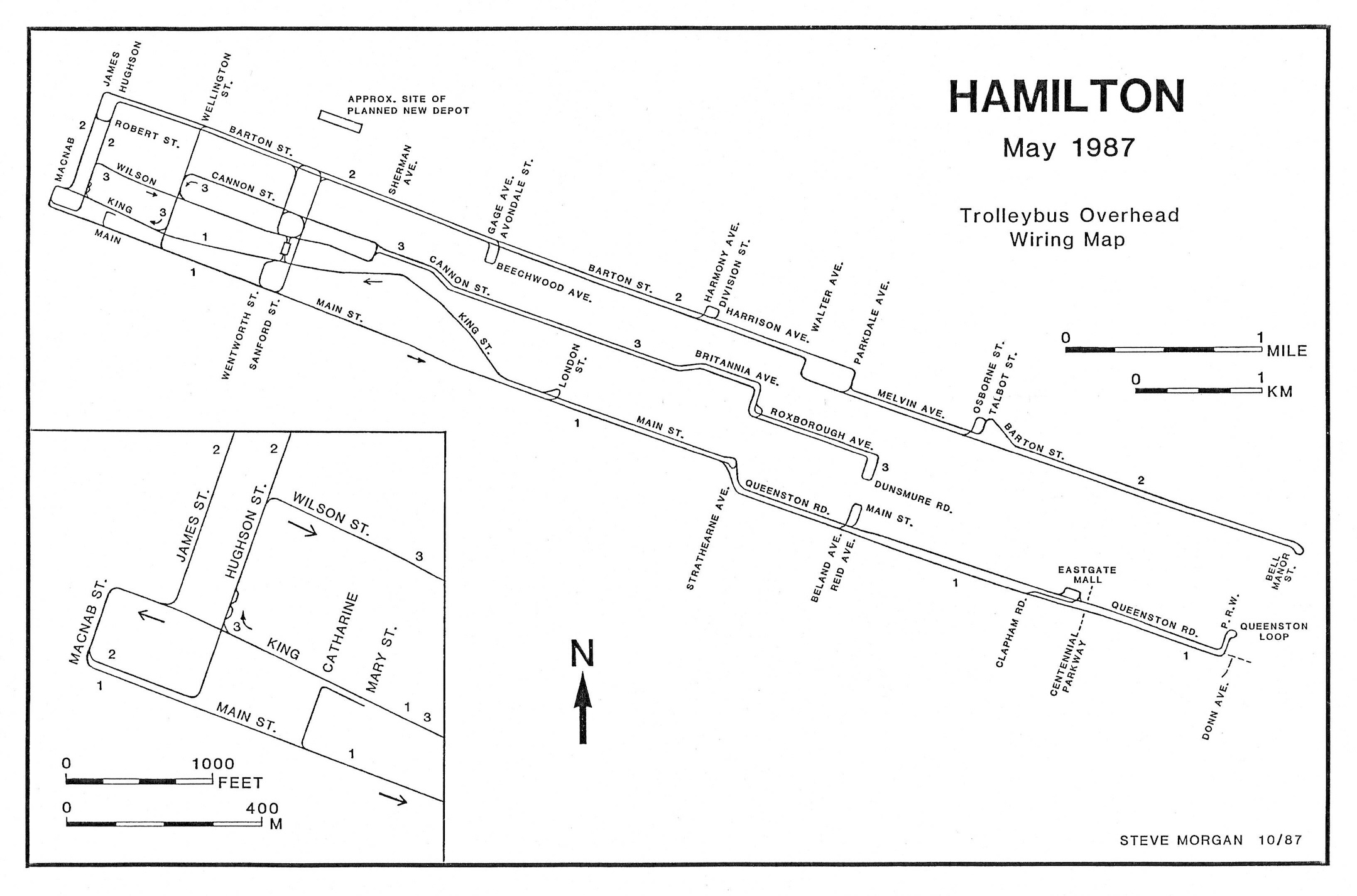

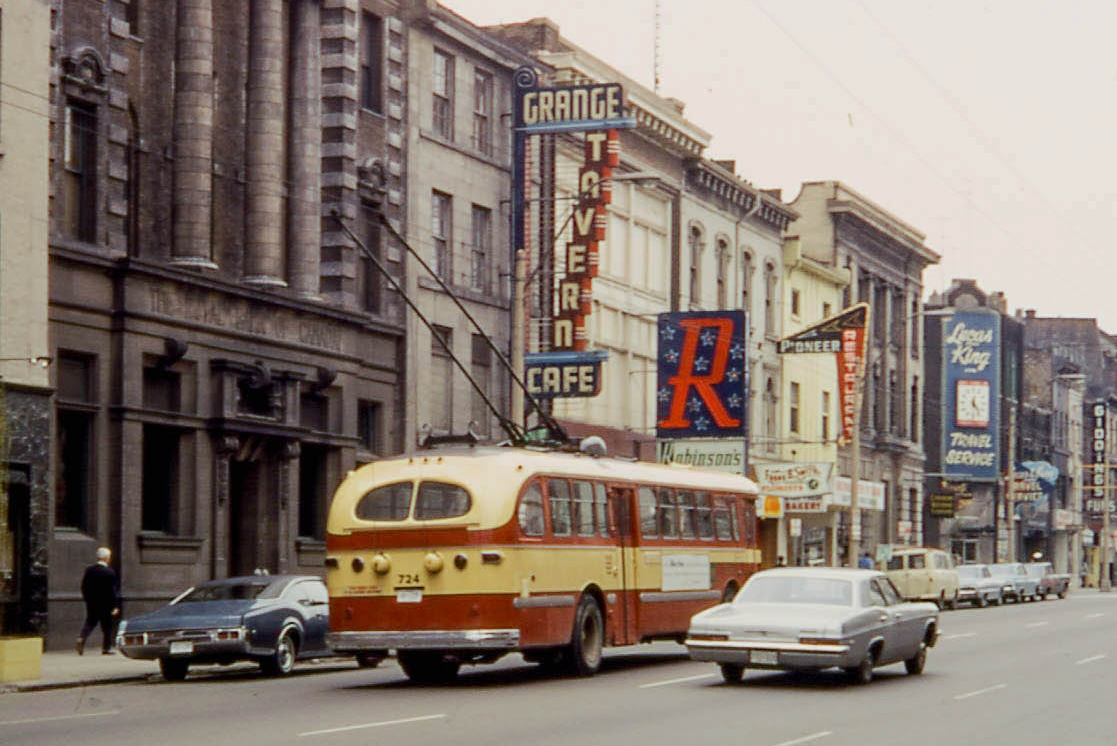
A Brill trolley bus downtown on King Street in 1968

The Hamilton trolley bus system formed part of the public transport network of the city of Hamilton, Ontario, Canada, from 1950 to 1992. For most of its history, it comprised three routes. Trolley buses, often known as trolley coaches when the system was in operation, were introduced in 1950 as part of a programme by the Hamilton Street Railway (HSR) to replace its remaining streetcar lines. The first route was named Cannon, for Cannon Street, and was unnumbered. HSR closed the last streetcar line in April 1951 and opened a second trolley bus route in October 1951. The latter route, King/Barton, had two branches running east from downtown Hamilton, and in 1960 they were split into separate routes. The trolley bus system retained the same three routes – eventually given numbers as 1–King, 2–Barton, and 3–Cannon – for the remainder of its history, albeit with some routing revisions and extensions made to all three over the years. HSR was municipalized in 1960.

In the 1970s, the original fleet of 50 CanCar–Brill trolley buses built in 1950–1951 was replaced by 40 Flyer trolley buses built in 1972–1973 and 16 more in 1978–1979, but all 56 Flyer vehicles incorporated electrical equipment recycled from the Brill trolley buses. In the mid-1980s, when most of its trolley buses were over 10–12 years old and had electrical equipment more than 30 years old, HSR began to consider phasing-out trolley bus service. A 1986 consultant's report recommended such action, but the city council and Hamilton–Wentworth Regional Council both opposed the idea, as did a majority of the general public, and the two councils favoured replacing the aging fleet with new trolley buses. Temporary substitution of diesel buses for trolley buses became more common in the late 1980s, largely because of road construction. In January 1990, HSR replaced its bus garage with a new one but did not construct overhead wires connecting it to the wires of the trolley bus system, which required all but the newest series of trolley buses to be towed between the garage and the trolley wires at the beginning and end of each shift. Routes 1 and 3 became indefinitely converted to diesel buses, and ultimately trolley bus service never resumed on those routes. Only route 2–Barton continued to use trolley buses after January 1990, and this usage ended on 30 December 1992, when the vehicles' licences were expiring and the transit agency decided not to renew them. A possible purchase of new trolley buses was still under consideration in 1993 and 1994, as was a lease of 40 used-but-younger trolley buses from the Edmonton trolley bus system, but these options were eventually ruled-out on cost grounds, with the regional council voting in March 1994 to make the suspension of trolley bus service permanent.

== Routes ==
At its maximum, the system consisted of the following three routes:

1–King	Downtown – Eastgate Square – Queenston Loop (Stoney Creek)
2–Barton	Downtown – Bell Manor Street
3-Cannon	Downtown – Reid Avenue & Dunsmure Road

== Opening and first decade ==
Plans to abandon Hamilton's streetcar system were announced in 1946, after the Hamilton Street Railway (HSR) was acquired by Canada Coach Lines, and it was decided to introduce trolley bus service as part of the system reorganization. The first trolley bus was delivered on April 16, 1950. On December 10, 1950, the first trolley buses went into service on the then-4.1-mile-long (6.6 km) Cannon route, replacing a busy bus route. Its outer end was at Strathearne Avenue and Roxborough Avenue. Only one streetcar line was still in operation by then, and that last line, the Belt Line, was closed on April 5, 1951 (with a ceremonial last run on the following day). On October 24, 1951, a second trolley bus route opened, as the 8.6-mile-long (13.8 km) King–Barton route, with branches running east from the central area along both Barton and King Streets. The two routes were designated only by names. The fleet originally consisted of 50 Canadian Car & Foundry–Brill vehicles (built by CCF using Brill designs under licence).

In 1956, the city introduced one-way streets in downtown Hamilton, and some changes to the routings and overhead wires were made to accommodate the change. All three routes were extended eastwards at their outer ends in 1959–1960. The King–Barton route's Main/King branch was extended from Strathearne Avenue along Queenston Road to Reid Avenue on March 25, 1959. On the same date, that route's Barton Street branch was extended from Parkdale Avenue along Barton to Talbot Street. On October 31, 1960, the King–Barton route was split into the separate King and Barton routes and the Cannon Street route was extended from Strathearne Avenue and Roxborough Avenue along Roxborough to Reid Avenue. Originally having only names, the three routes were given numbers around this time: 1 for the King route, 2 for Barton, and 3 for the Cannon route.

== 1960s, 1970s, and fleet renewal ==
HSR, a private company, was municipalized in 1960. In September 1970, the section of the eastbound 2-Cannon route between Wellington and Sherman Streets was moved from Cannon Street to parallel Wilson Street as a result of the conversion of the affected section of Cannon to one-way traffic.

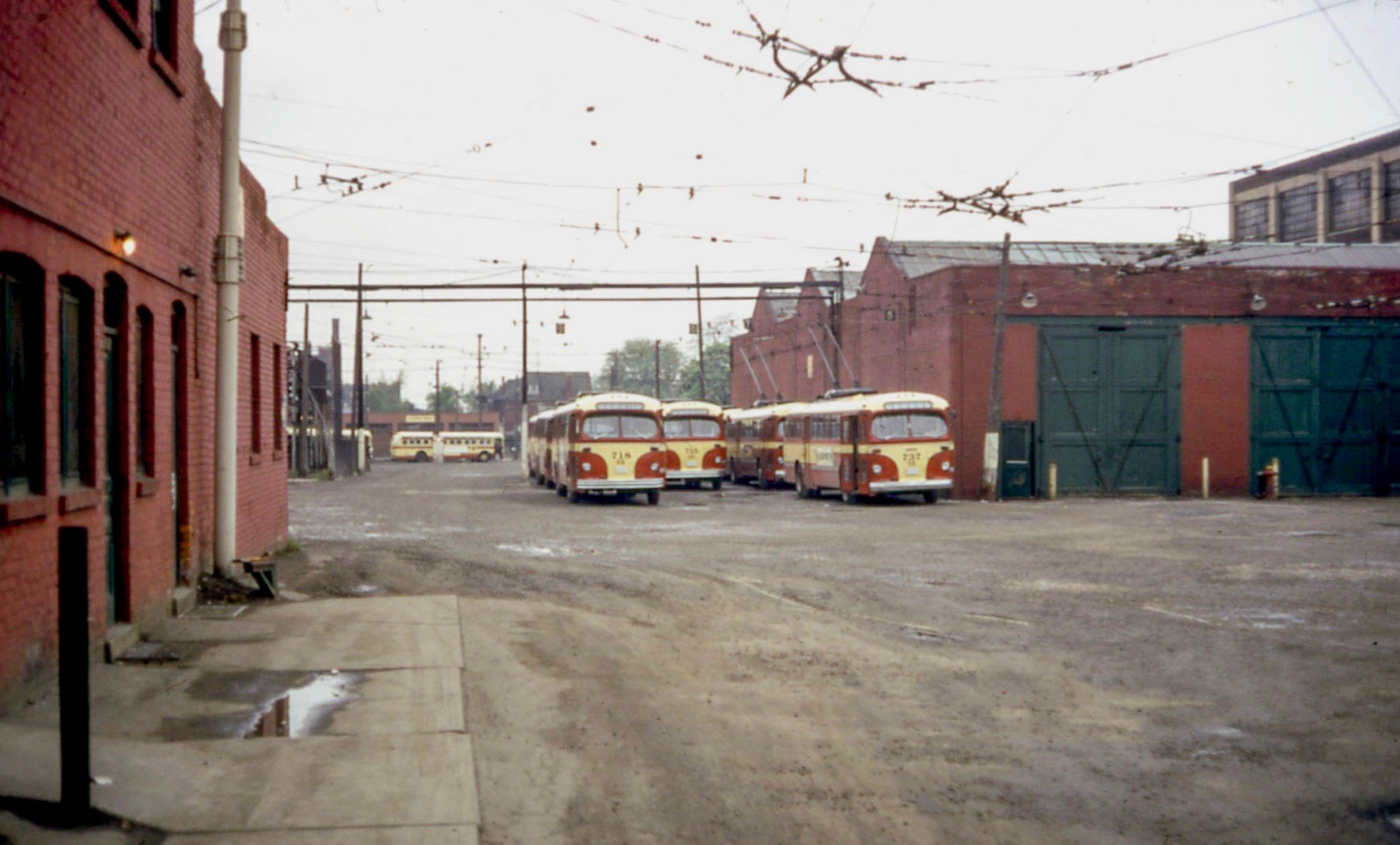
Brill trolley buses at the original garage, between Sanford and Wentworth streets. This garage was replaced in January 1990.

By 1970, HSR began to consider the acquisition of new trolley buses to begin replacing the CCF–Brill vehicles. The Toronto Transit Commission had contracted with Western Flyer Coach in 1967 to build a prototype new trolley bus by transferring refurbished electrical propulsion equipment from one of its old Brill trolley buses into a new body, and the new vehicle began trial runs on the Toronto trolley bus system in 1968, followed by the delivery of production-series units in 1971. In March 1972, one of the latter (No. 9213) was brought to Hamilton for evaluation by HSR. This led to the transit agency's placing an order with Flyer Industries – Western Flyer Coach's name since 1971 – for 40 new trolley buses. These model E700A vehicles began to arrive in late 1972, and the first unit (No. 751) entered service in late November 1972. The last units arrived in 1973. Ten of the Brill trolley buses remained in service. Their use was not limited to peak periods, and at least two were repainted in a version of a new yellow HSR paint scheme in which the Flyers had been delivered.

In mid-1973, the consulting firm of De Leuw, Cather & Company recommended extensions of all three routes, two of which came to fruition. The first to be constructed was of route 1 east to Stoney Creek, which opened on September 4, 1977. This turned off of Queenston Road about 500 feet west of Donn Avenue, and its last section followed an unnamed and unpaved private road. HSR referred to this terminus as Queenston Loop.

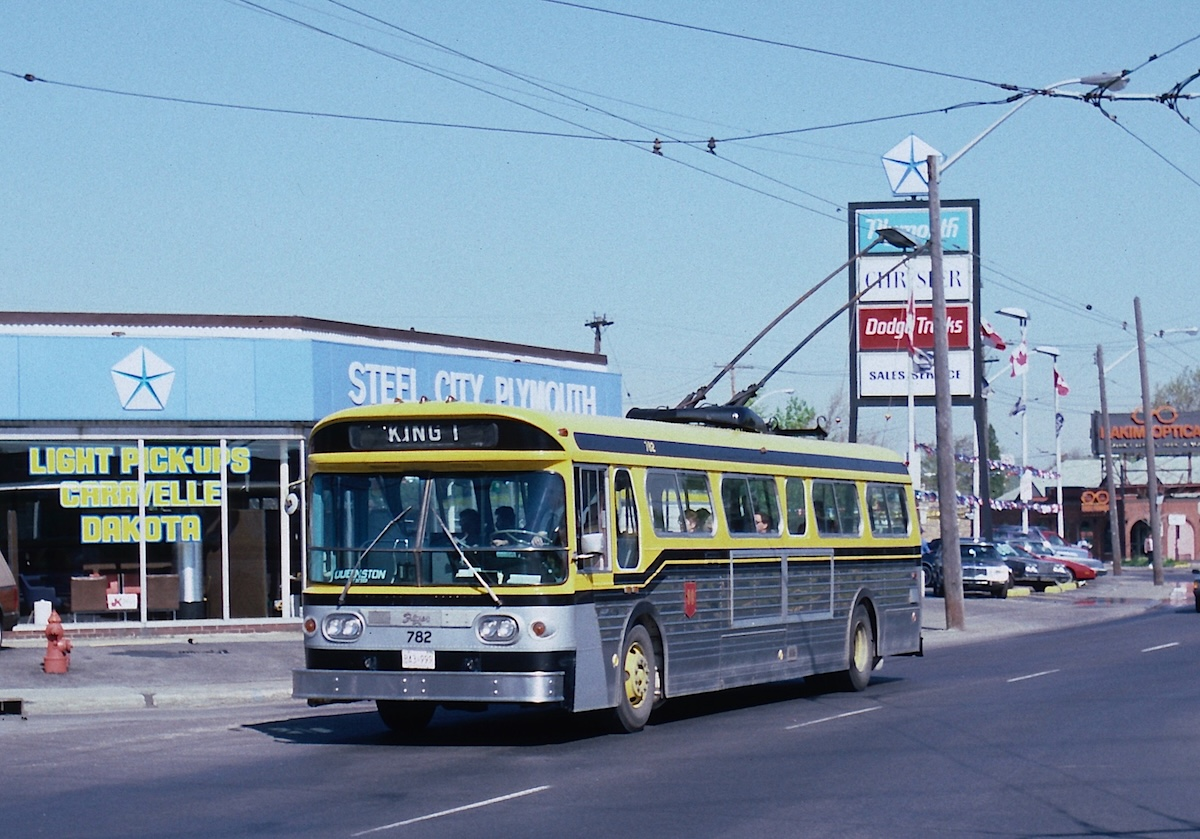
1973 Flyer E700A trolley bus 782 outbound on route 1–King at Strathearne Avenue

Sixteen Flyer E800A vehicles were added to the fleet in 1978–1979. As with the earlier E700 trolley buses, the E800s used some electrical components, such as traction motors, from retired Brill trolley buses, but that in the E800s came not from HSR Brills but from Brills of the Thunder Bay trolley bus system (closed in 1972), purchased by HSR for the parts. The first unit, No. 7801, was delivered in October 1978, and the last active CCF-Brill trolley buses were retired within a few months, in 1979.

Route 2 was extended east from Talbot Street to Bell Manor Street on July 29, 1979, replacing a short bus route. For at least a time, in the mid-1980s, alternate trips were ending at Talbot Street (shown as 2C on the trolley buses' destination signs), but by at least 1989 all trips were running through to Bell Manor.

== 1980s: Uncertain future ==
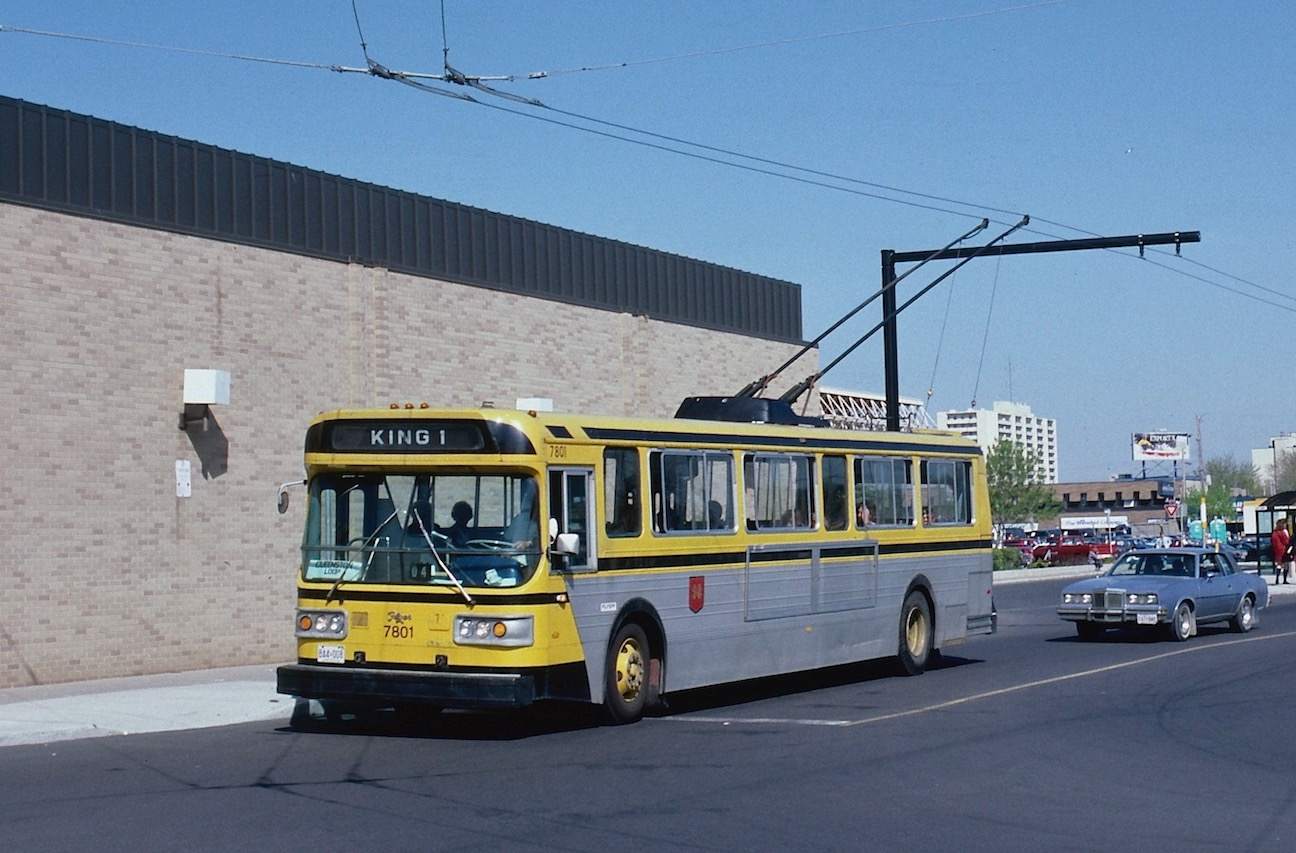
One of the E800 trolley buses using the overhead wires that opened at Eastgate Square mall in 1986

All weekend operation of trolley buses ceased at the beginning of 1984, with diesel buses then scheduled to provide the service on all routes on weekends. However, Saturday use of trolley buses resumed in November 1990 (on what, by then, was the sole remaining route still using trolley buses, route 2). In 1986, a new HSR transit interchange that had been built at the Eastgate Square mall was equipped with overhead trolley wires for route 1–King, and starting on September 2, 1986, alternate trips on route 1 terminated at Eastgate Square while the remaining trips continued to Stoney Creek. Ownership of the unpaved private road at the outer end of the route changed hands in 1987, and the new owner banned HSR vehicles. Trolley bus service to Queenston Loop ended on September 4, 1987, with the route formally cut back to Eastgate mall on September 8. The wires on the private road were quickly dismantled.

In the mid-1980s, the older Flyer trolley buses were nearing the end of their useful life, given that their electrical equipment had been recycled from 1950 trolley buses. HSR noted that new diesel buses were cheaper to buy than new trolley buses. A 1986 consultants' report recommended closure of the system, but that idea was met with significant opposition from the public. In November 1986, the city council and Hamilton–Wentworth Regional Council both voted in favour of retaining trolley bus operation and endorsed buying new trolley buses, and small investments in new infrastructure were still being made, such as the 1986 construction of wiring at Eastgate Square mall. However, temporary substitutions of diesel buses for trolley buses became increasingly common in the late 1980s, largely because of traffic lane closures during road work. Construction of a new bus garage at 330 Wentworth Street North, which would replace the Sanford Avenue garage, began in summer 1988. Known as the Wentworth Street Transit Centre, the new garage opened on January 8, 1990.

== Final years ==
Diesel buses temporarily replaced trolley buses on routes 1–King and 3–Cannon in May 1989 because of road construction projects, with trolley buses returning to both routes in November 1989. However, both routes were again dieselized in early January 1990 for what would ultimately be the last time. Only route 2–Barton then remained in operation with trolley buses. The new HSR garage that had opened in January 1990 was located a few blocks away from the overhead trolley wires, north of Barton Street, and was not connected to the system with any wires. Because of this, in 1989–1990 HSR retrofitted all but one of the E800 trolley buses with a small auxiliary diesel engine for off-wire movements. By May 1990, only three E700 trolley buses remained in service, and they had to be towed between the new garage and the wiring because of their lack of off-wire capability. Operation of the last E700s in service ended in summer 1991, and route 2 was diesel-operated from late June to early September 1991 because of road construction on Main Street, leaving no trolley buses in service on any route during that period.

In January 1992, the results of a study of options for the future of the system, commissioned by HSR, stopped short of recommending the elimination of trolley buses but concluded that retaining them would be the most expension option. However, the Hamilton–Wentworth Regional Council supported trolley buses and voted in April 1992 to retain the current network for the time being, at least until a final decision could be made.

The last day of trolley bus operation on the last route, 2–Barton, was December 30, 1992, when only a single trolley bus (No. 7815) was in service, after HSR decided not to renew the provincial licences for the remaining vehicles. At the time, the regional council was still planning to purchase new trolley buses for routes 1 and 2, and HSR issued a draft specification for new trolley buses in April 1993. Subsequently, the transit agency considered purchasing or leasing 40 trolley buses from the Edmonton trolley bus system that had been on loan to the Toronto Transit Commission since 1989–1990 and were in storage in Toronto after the 1993 closure of the trolley bus system there. One of the vehicles was brought to Hamilton from Toronto in January 1994 for evaluation. However, after HSR concluded that the Edmonton vehicles would require costly modifications for Hamilton, the regional council voted on March 1, 1994 to make the system's closure permanent. It was the first closure of a trolley bus system in Canada since that of Calgary, in March 1975. In June 1994, HSR hired a contractor to dismantle all of the overhead wires, and the work was completed in October 1994.

== Fleet ==
Fleet numbers	Qty.	Year built	Manufacturer	Model	Last used	Notes
701–750	50	1950–1951	Canadian Car and Foundry – Brill	T48/T48A	1979	
751–790	40	1972–1973	Flyer Industries Ltd.	E700A	1991	All incorporated electrical equipment recycled from retired CCF–Brill trolley buses. Refurbished in 1982–1983 by Ontario Bus & Truck.
7801–7816	16	1978	Flyer Industries Ltd.	E800A	1992	All incorporated electrical equipment recycled from retired CCF–Brill trolley buses. In 1989–1990, all but one were retrofitted with a small auxiliary diesel engine for off-wire movement. After the system's closure, No. 7809 was acquired by New Flyer and donated in early 1995 to the Servicio de Transportes Eléctricos, the operator of the large Mexico City trolleybus system. After refurbishment of its electrical equipment by GEC–Alsthom, it was renumbered 3250 by STE and placed into service in April 1996. It was out of service by January 1999.

=== Preserved vehicles ===
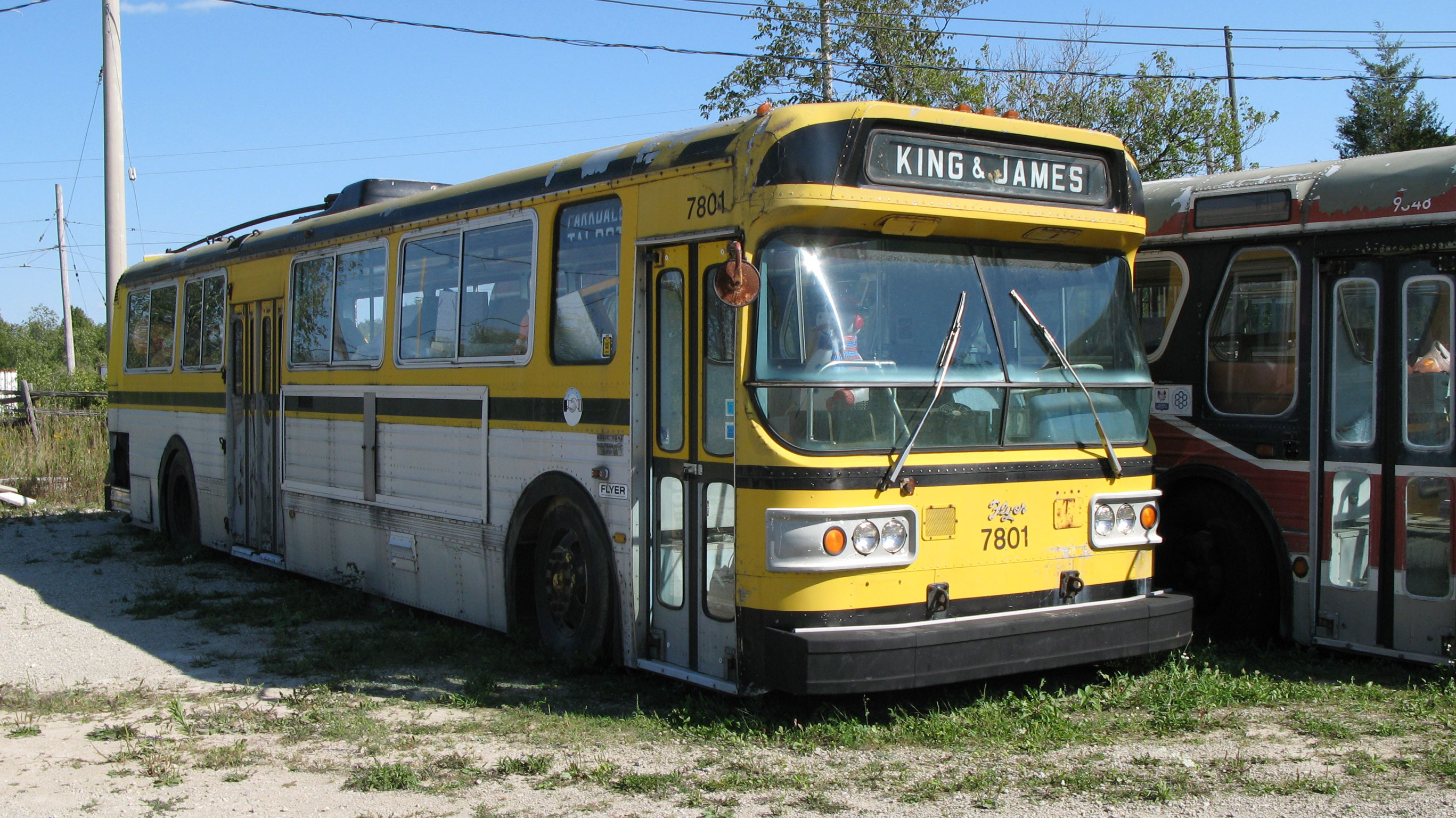
HSR trolley bus 7801 at the Halton County Radial Railway museum in 2012

Four trolley buses from the Hamilton system have been preserved, all by the Halton County Radial Railway.

- No. 732, a 1951 CCF–Brill T48A
- No. 765, a 1973 Flyer E700A
- No. 7801, a 1978 Flyer E800A
- No. 7802, a 1978 Flyer E800A

== See also ==
- List of trolley bus systems in Canada
