= Trolley buses in Edmonton =

Edmonton trolley bus system
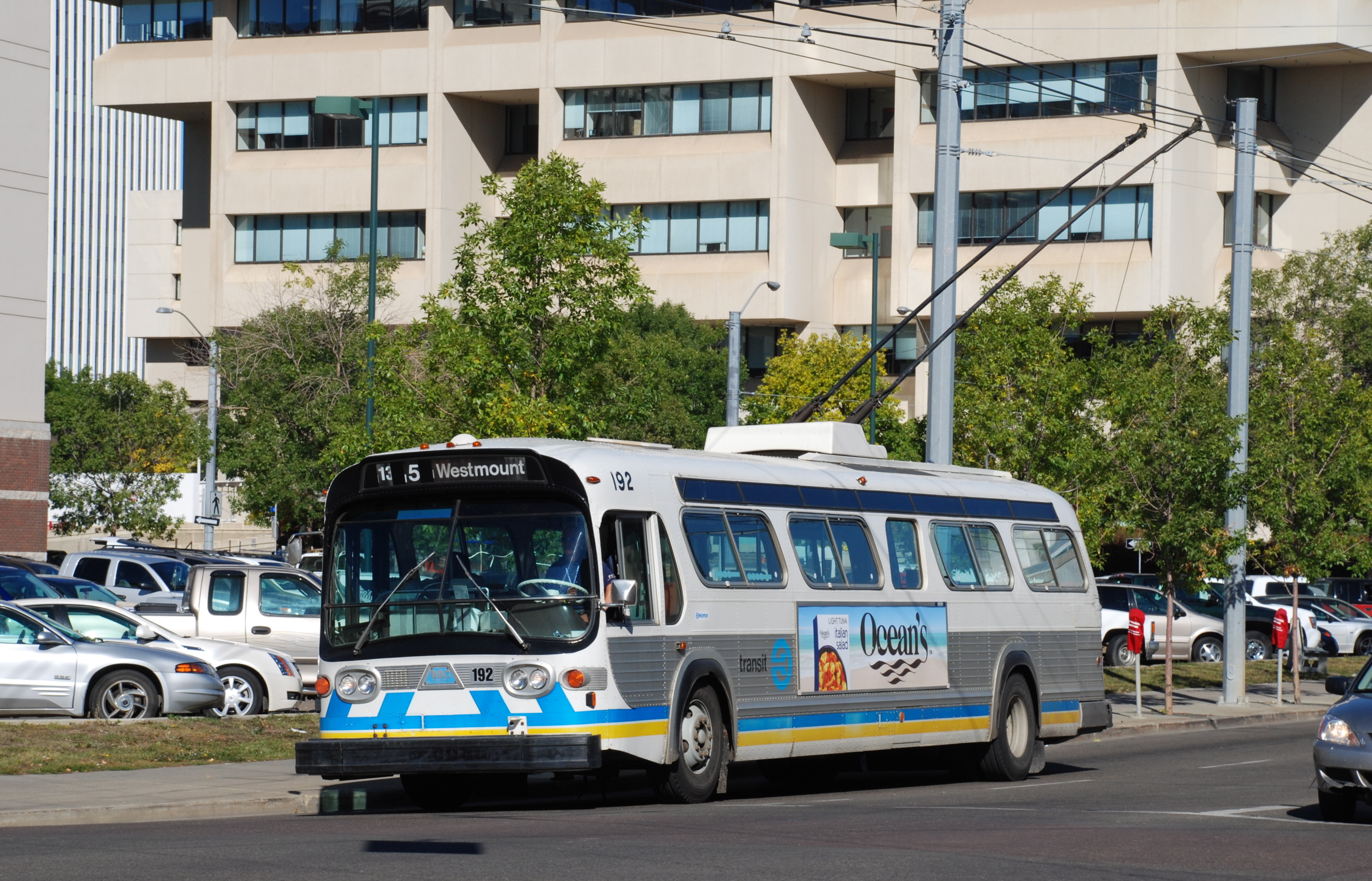
- BBC trolley bus on 97th Street, September 2008.

Operation
- Locale: Edmonton, Alberta, Canada
- Open: September 24, 1939; 86 years ago
- Close: May 2, 2009; 17 years ago
- Operator: Edmonton Transit System (ETS)

Infrastructure
- Electrification: 600 V DC

The Edmonton trolley bus system formed part of the public transport network in Edmonton, Alberta, Canada between 1939 and 2009. Operated by Edmonton Transit System (ETS), the system had, at its peak, a fleet of 137 trolley buses, and a total route length of 127 km (79 mi).

== History ==
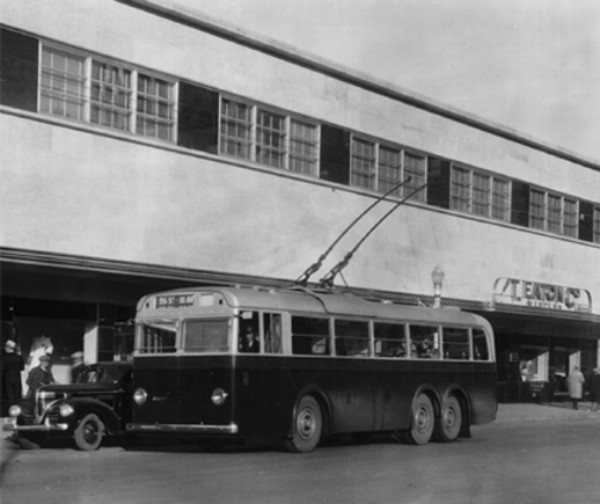
Leyland trolley bus in front of Eaton's department store, ca 1940.

Trolley bus service in Edmonton started on September 24, 1939, as part of the then-named Edmonton Radial Railway, operating on route 5 from 101 St/Jasper Ave to 95 St/111 Ave. By the end of October of that year, service had started on another route running to 99 St/Whyte Ave via the Low Level Bridge. In Edmonton, trolley buses were often referred to simply as "trolleys".

The trolley bus system used a mixture of Ohio Brass and K&M Elastic (Swiss) suspension for holding up the overhead wires.

The 49 vehicles remaining in use in 2008 were from an order of 100 manufactured in 1981–82 by Brown Boveri & Company (BBC), using bodies and chassis supplied to BBC by GM. These 100 vehicles for Edmonton were the only trolley buses ever built with the GM "New Look" body, whereas more than 44,000 motor buses were built to that design.

From 1989/1991 to 1993, 40 trolley buses that were surplus to ETS's needs were leased to the Toronto trolley bus system.

In 2007, a low-floor model of trolley bus was leased from Coast Mountain Bus Company, Vancouver's bus operating company, for a one-year period, for testing of possible benefits of low-floor trolley buses over hybrid diesel buses. During its time in Edmonton the bus was numbered 6000, but its Vancouver number, 2242, was restored when it returned to there.

On June 18, 2008, city council voted 7 to 6 in favour of phasing out the trolley bus system in 2009 and 2010. However, city council decided in April 2009 that trolley bus service would be discontinued earlier than originally planned, in order to reduce the city's expected $35 million deficit in 2009. The last day of service was May 2, 2009.

== Fleet ==
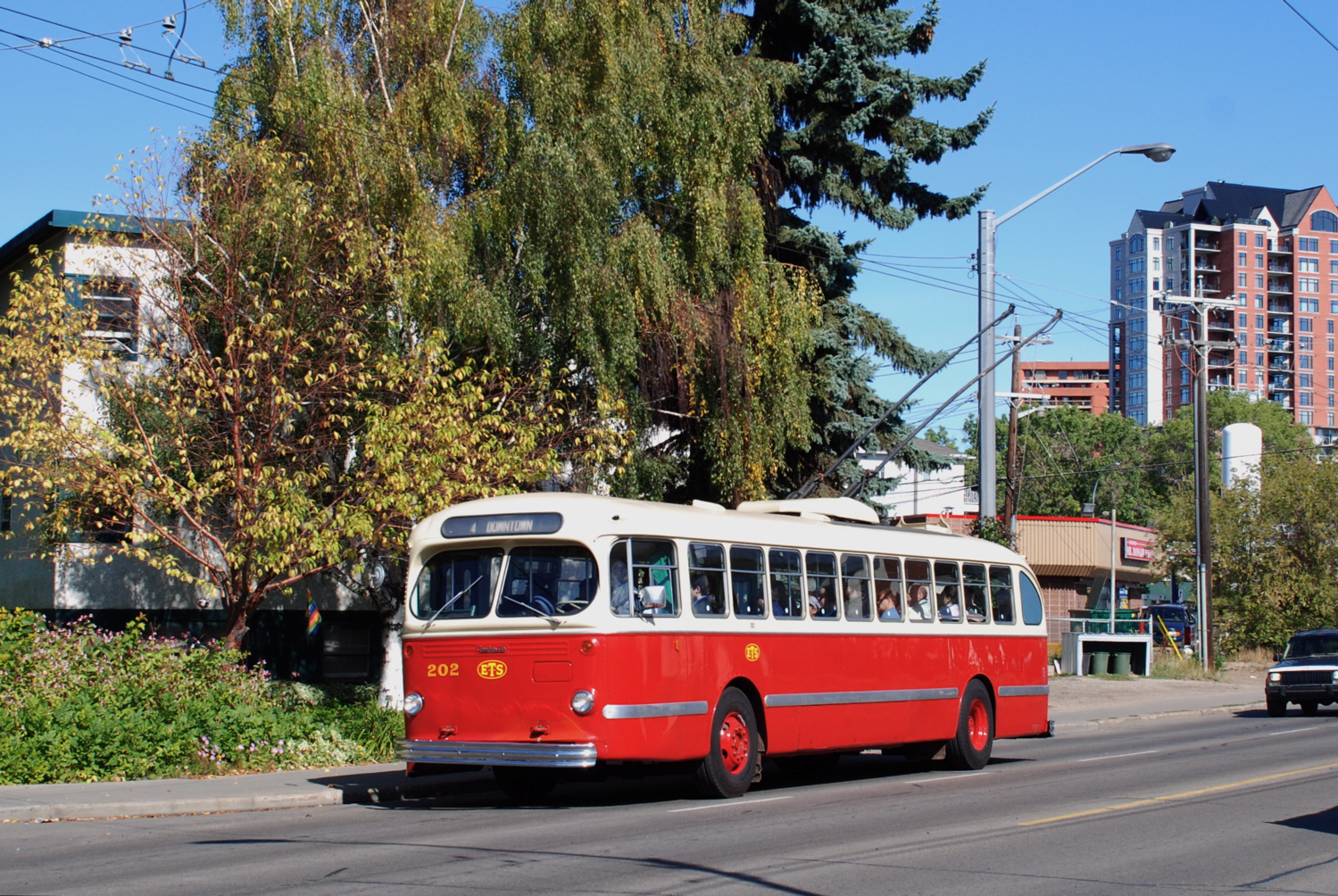
Preserved CCF-Brill T48A trolley bus, September 2008.

All-time list of Edmonton trolley buses
Numbers	Built	Withdrawn	Make	Model	Notes
101–103	1939	1951	Associated Equipment Company (AEC) / English Electric	663T	
104–109	1939	1951	Leyland	663T	
110–112	1942	1962	Mack Truck Co.	CR3S	
113–128	1944	1965	Pullman-Standard		No. 116 has been preserved, renumbered 113, by the City of Edmonton.
129–130	1945	1965	American Car & Foundry–Brill	TC44	
131–192	1947–48	1978	Canadian Car & Foundry (CCF) – Brill	T44	purchased secondhand from Regina Transit in 1966; No. 148 has been preserved by the City of Edmonton.
193–202	1952–54	1978	CCF–Brill	T48A	No. 202 (built 1954) has been preserved by the City of Edmonton.
203–212	1947	1978	CCF–Brill	T44	purchased secondhand from Vancouver in 1962
213–249	1974–76	1987	Flyer Industries	E800	all sold to Mexico City's STE in 1987; most were refurbished in the 1990s, and although most were retired by 2002, the last active units(s), which were retrofitted with wheelchair lifts in Mexico City, remained in service until November 2019.
100–199	1981–82	2009	Brown, Boveri & Cie (BBC)	HR150G	109 and 110 sold to Dayton, Ohio, in 1994; 103/05–07/16–18/34/41/42/53/54/69/71/76/87/91/96 scrapped in 2005–07; 111/21/24/28/29/31/33/35/38/40/48/52/55/79/83/93/95/98 refurbished in 2004–07; 40 units leased to Toronto Transit Commission from 1989/90 until July 1993
6000	2007	2008	New Flyer	E40LFR	low-floor trolley bus; leased from Coast Mountain Bus Company (Vancouver) for one year in 2007–08, for evaluation

== Depots ==
- Cromdale Garage – formerly an Edmonton Radial Railway trolley bus / streetcar barn, then bus facility and historic fleet storage. Has since been demolished, site being repurposed by ETS.
- Ferrier Garage – formerly a trolley bus garage; remains in use as a bus facility.
- Mitchell Garage – constructed in 1981 and was equipped and opened as a trolley bus garage in 1983; closed in June 2007, then becoming a bus-only facility.
- Westwood Garage – formerly a trolley bus garage, opening in 1961 and closed as an active garage when the trolley bus system closed in 2009; remained in use as a bus facility until 2020.
- Strathcona Garage – opened as a trolley bus garage in 1951, closed in 1986; now home to Old Strathcona Farmer's Market and Edmonton Radial Railway Society High Level Bridge Streetcar storage.

== Preservation ==
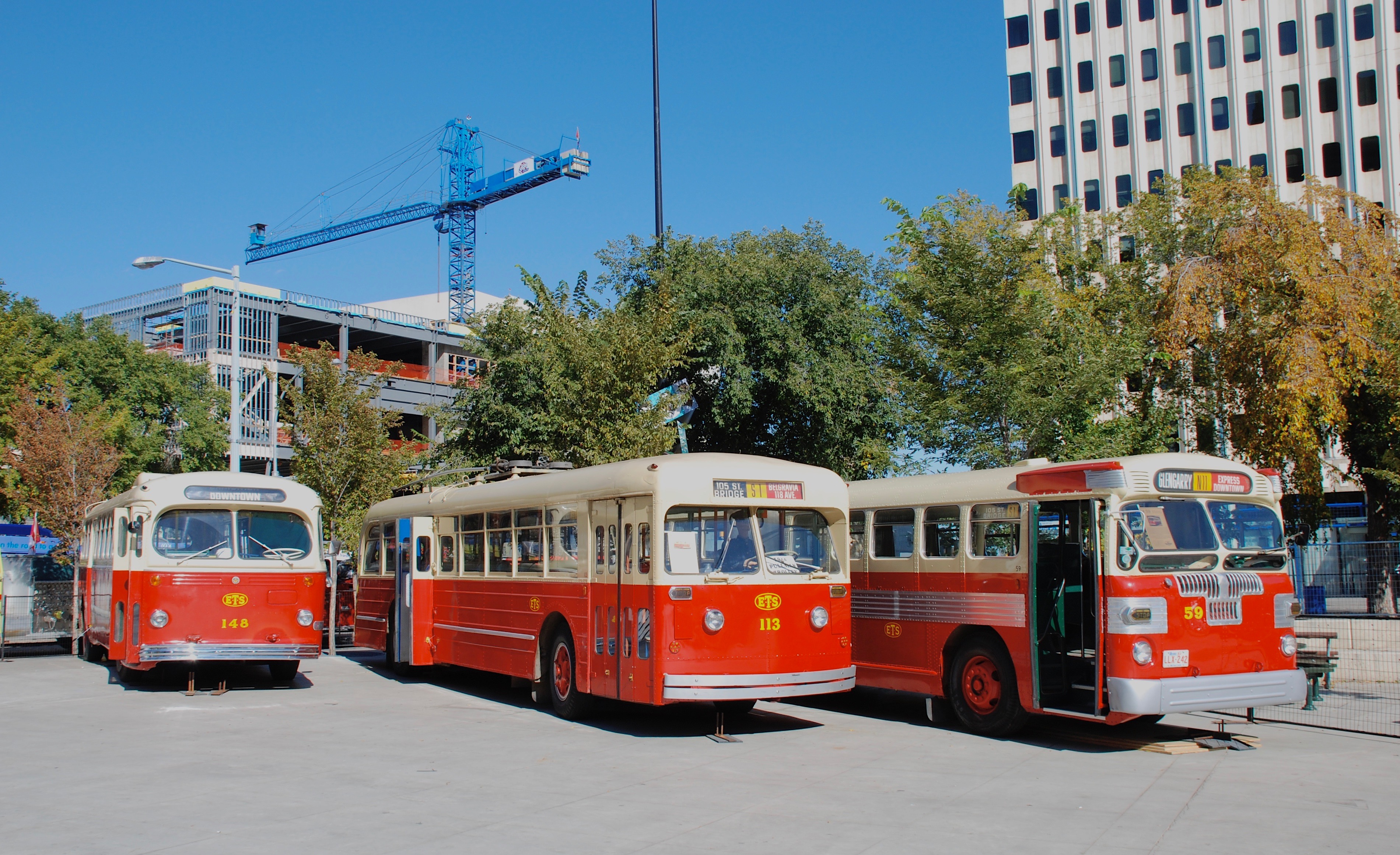
City-owned trolley buses 148 and 113, and motor bus 59, on display at Churchill Square in 2008

At least five of Edmonton's 1982 BBC HR150G trolley buses have been preserved by museums or museum-type groups. Those at museums are No. 125, at the Seashore Trolley Museum (in Kennebunkport, Maine, United States); No. 181, at the Illinois Railway Museum (in Union, Illinois, U.S.); and No. 189, at the Trolleybus Museum at Sandtoft (U.K.). No. 132 was preserved for several years by the Transit Museum Society in Vancouver, but was scrapped in 2022. In addition, a BBC is expected to be added to the City of Edmonton's collection of historic vehicles, which already includes three vintage trolley buses: Pullman 113 (ex-116) and CCF-Brills 148 and 202. No. 199 has been preserved by the Reynolds Alberta Museum in Wetaskiwin, Alberta. No. 152 was expected to be preserved for the future public transit museum in Sofia, Bulgaria. A group of enthusiasts managed to raise the $10,000 needed for its purchase, but the trolley bus had already been scrapped in early 2018.

== See also ==
- History of Edmonton
- List of trolley bus systems in Canada
- St. Albert Transit
- Strathcona County Transit
