= List of trolley bus systems in Canada =

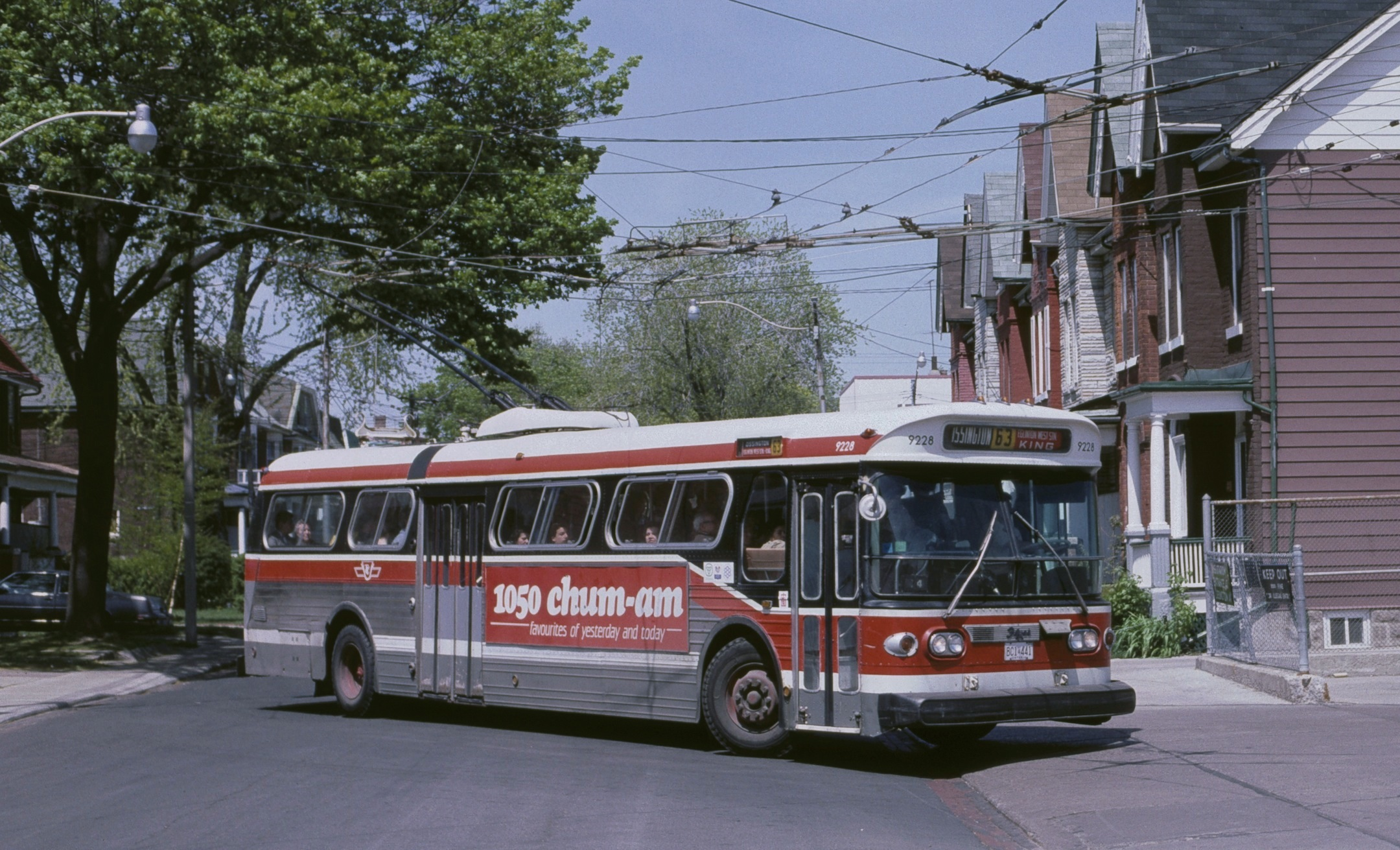
Flyer trolley bus of the Toronto system, operating on route 63-Ossington, 1987

This is a list of trolley bus systems in Canada by province. It includes all trolley bus systems, past and present. Use of boldface for a city name and colour highlighting indicates a system that still operates, the only one being Vancouver.

== Alberta ==
Name of system (current or last)	Location	Date (from)	Date (to)	Notes
Calgary Transit System	Calgary	1 June 1947	8 March 1975	
Edmonton Transit System (Note: Previous operators of the Edmonton trolley bus system were Edmonton Radial Railway, 1939–46, and Edmonton Transportation System, 1946–77.)	Edmonton	24 September 1939	2 May 2009	See also Trolley buses in Edmonton.

== British Columbia ==
Name of system (current or last)	Location	Date (from)	Date (to)	Notes
TransLink (Note: Previous operators of the Vancouver system were British Columbia Electric Railway, 1948–1962; BC Hydro, 1962–73; Greater Vancouver Transit System, 1973–78; Urban Transit Authority, 1978–82; and BC Transit, 1982–99.)	**Vancouver**	16 August 1948		Also a demonstration, 5–14 December 1945. See also Trolley buses in Vancouver.

Note: There was also a demonstration trolley bus line in Victoria in 1945, operated by the British Columbia Electric Railway, from 19 to 30 November 1945.

== Manitoba ==
Name of system (current or last)	Location	Date (from)	Date (to)	Notes
Metro Transit (Note: Formerly known as the Greater Winnipeg Transit Commission (1953–60), which replaced the Winnipeg Electric Company (1924–53). Replaced by Winnipeg Transit in Jan. 1972.)	Winnipeg	21 November 1938	30 October 1970	

== Nova Scotia ==
Name of System	Location	Date (From)	Date (To)	Notes
Nova Scotia Light and Power Company, Limited	Halifax	27 March 1949	31 December 1969	

== Ontario ==
Name of system	Location	Date (from)	Date (to)	Notes
Cornwall Street Railway, Light and Power Company, Limited	Cornwall	8 June 1949	31 May 1970	
Fort William Transit Company	Fort William	15 December 1947	1970	see Thunder Bay.
Hamilton Street Railway	Hamilton	10 December 1950	30 December 1992	See Trolley buses in Hamilton.
Kitchener Public Utilities Commission	Kitchener	1 January 1947	26 March 1973	
Ottawa Transportation Commission	Ottawa	15 December 1951	27 June 1959	
Port Arthur Transit	Port Arthur	15 December 1947	1970	See Thunder Bay.
Thunder Bay Transit	Thunder Bay	15 December 1947	16 July 1972	Fort William and Port Arthur merged to form Thunder Bay from 31 December 1969.
Toronto Transit Commission bus system Toronto Transit Commission (Note: Name was Toronto Transportation Commission until 31 December 1953.)	Toronto	18 June 1922 19 June 1947	31 August 1925 16 July 1993	Service suspended 19 Jan. to 4 Sep. 1992. Final closure on 16 July 1993 (the very early hours of 17 July). See Trolley buses in Toronto.
Sandwich, Windsor & Amherstburg Railway Company	Windsor	5 May 1922	November 1926 (?)	

== Quebec ==
Name of system	Location	Date (from)	Date (to)	Notes
Montreal Tramways Company	Montreal	29 March 1937	18 June 1966	Montreal Tramways Company succeeded by the Montreal Transit Commission, 1951

== Saskatchewan ==
Name of system	Location	Date (from)	Date (to)	Notes
Regina Municipal Railway; Regina Transit System	Regina	4 September 1947	28 February 1966	
Saskatoon Transit System	Saskatoon	22 November 1948	13 May 1974	

== See also ==
- List of trolley bus systems, for all other countries
- Trolley bus usage by country
- List of street railways in Canada
- List of tram and light rail transit systems
- Lists of rapid transit systems
- Public transport in Canada

== Sources ==
=== Books and periodicals ===
- Murray, Alan. 2000. World Trolleybus Encyclopaedia (ISBN 0-904235-18-1). Reading, Berkshire, UK: Trolleybooks.
- Porter, Harry; and Stanley F.X. Worris. 1979. Trolleybus Bulletin No. 109: Databook II. North American Trackless Trolley Association (defunct). OCLC 6114089
- Sebree, Mac; and Paul Ward. 1974. The Trolley Coach in North America (Interurbans Special 59). Los Angeles, US: Interurbans. LCCN 74-20367.
- Trolleybus Magazine (ISSN 0266-7452). National Trolleybus Association (UK). Bimonthly.
