= Flyer 700/800/900 series =

Canadian bus model series

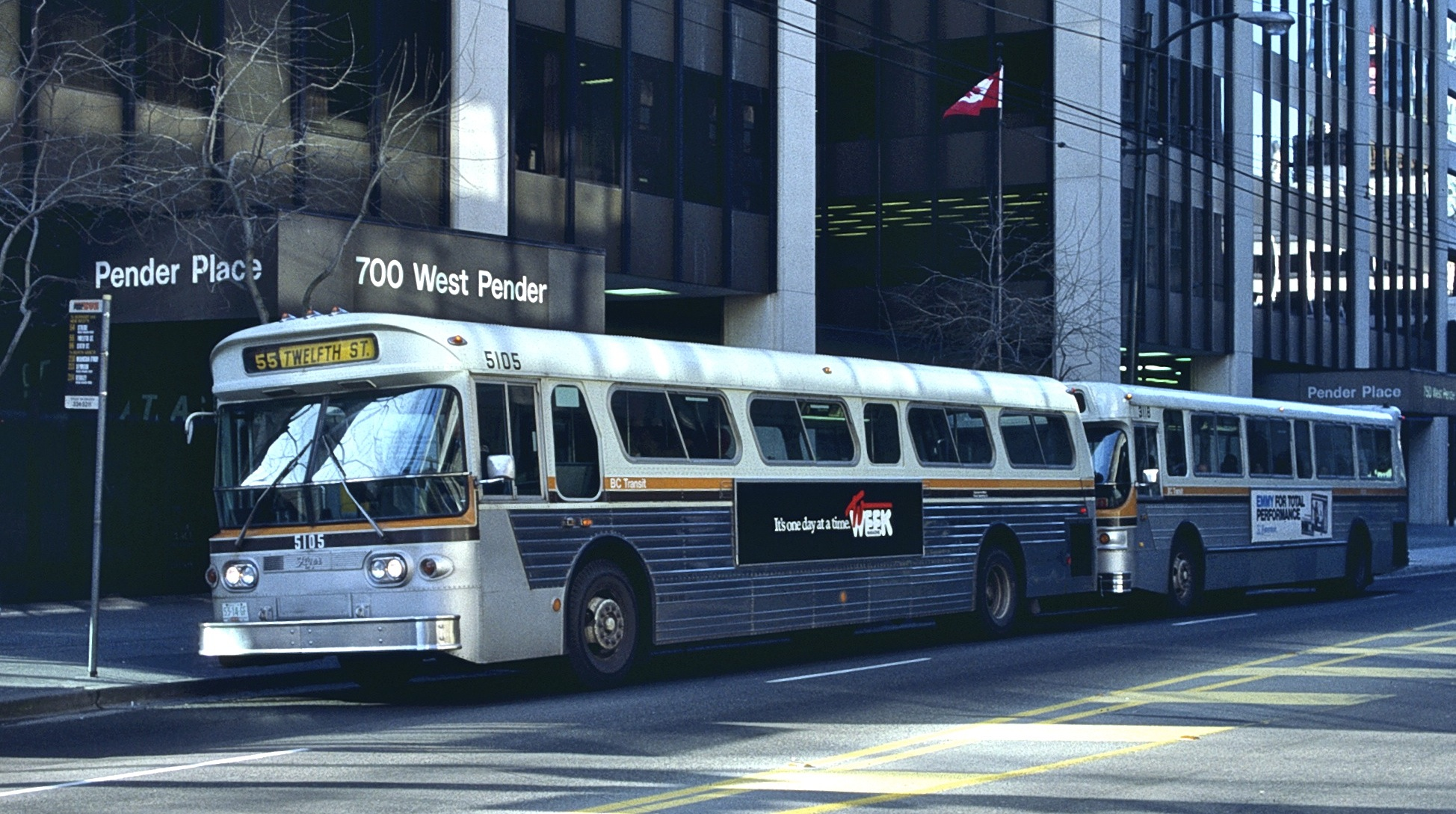
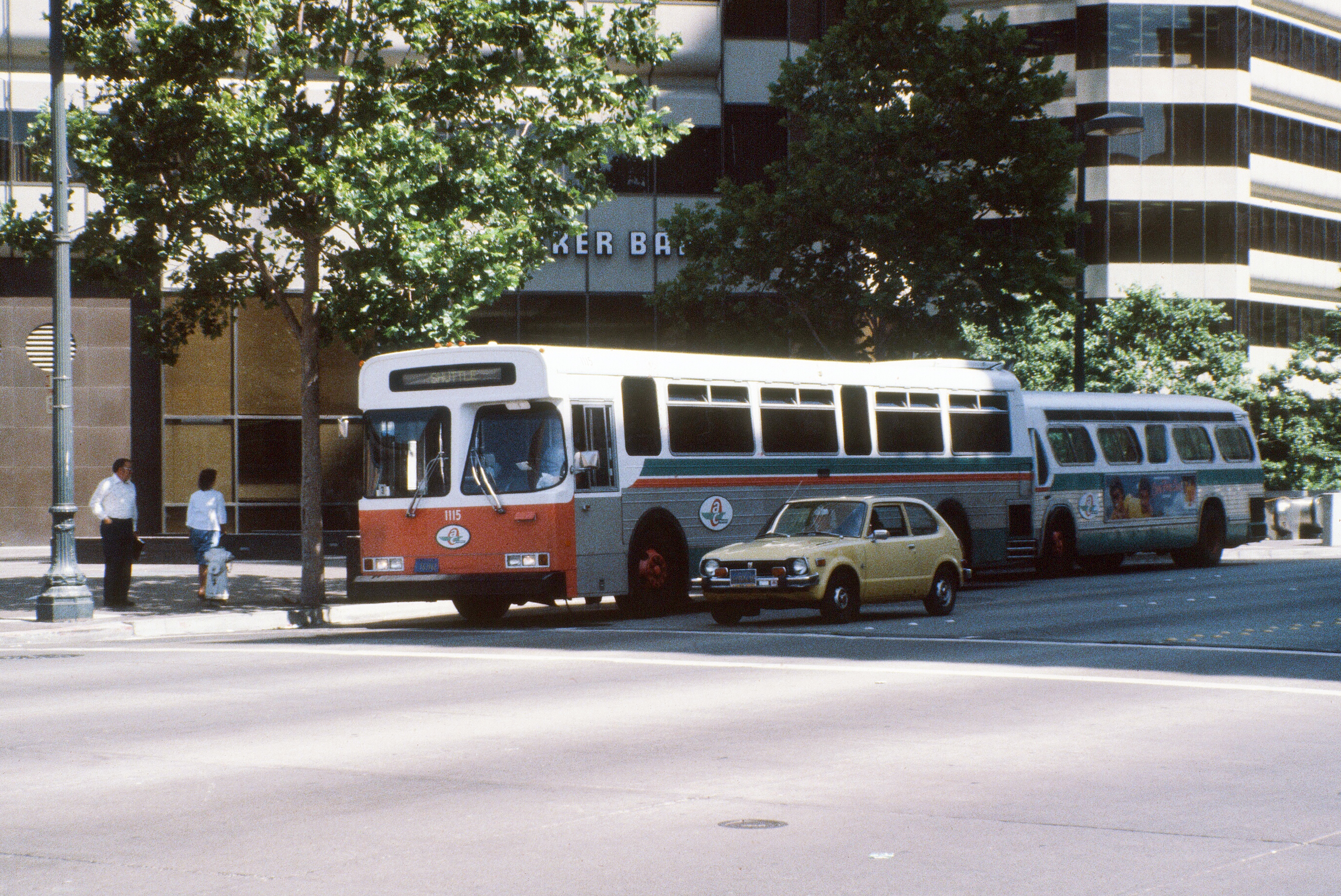
- Top: Flyer D700A leading a D800 in Vancouver (1984); Bottom: Flyer D901 and GM New Look in Oakland

Overview
- Manufacturer: Western Flyer, AM General, Flyer Industries, New Flyer
- Production: 1967–1987
- Assembly: Winnipeg (Flyer); Mishawaka, IN (AM General)

Body and chassis
- Class: Transit bus

Dimensions
- Length: 35 ft (10.7 m); 40 ft (12.19 m)
- Width: 96 in (2.44 m); 102 in (2.59 m)

Chronology
- Successor: New Flyer High Floor

The Flyer 700/800/900 series were a series of transit buses built in three generations by Western Flyer and its successors Flyer Industries and New Flyer, of Canada, between 1967 and 1987. Except for brief overlap during transition from one generation to the next, they were not in production concurrently. All individual model designations included a prefix of either D, for diesel propulsion, or E, for electrically powered trolleybuses, with the first digit indicating the generation and the last digit indicating a variant within the generation. The introductory model was the D700, originally released in 1967 for the Canadian transit market, and the last series group to be produced, D900 (and variant D901), was discontinued in 1987. Flyer had become New Flyer only the year before, in 1986.

The D700 was the first transit bus released by Western Flyer, which previously had manufactured exclusively suburban over-the-road coaches until then. It closely resembled the contemporaneous and popular GM New Look bus, including the multi-pane "fishbowl"-style windshield and parallelogram-shaped side windows. The D700 subsequently was licensed to AM General in 1970 for sales to American transit operators; AM General modified the exterior design with rectangular side windows and sold it as the AM General Metropolitan starting in 1974. Flyer later adopted the exterior changes made by AM General and sold the bus as the second-generation D800 and E800. The D900 was the third generation of the design, and is distinguished by a simpler windshield and rectangular headlights. Versions of each generation were also available in both diesel and trolleybus form.

== History ==
Model Codes
Motive power	Generation	Revision
D = diesel E = electric trolleybus	700 = first 800 = second 900 = third (models 900 / 901 / 902)	(none) = original version A = first B = second

For instance, a D901A is the first ("A") revision of the 901 variant from the 900 model, powered by a diesel engine. Sometimes the model number includes a reference to the nominal width and length, e.g. D901A-10235. In this case, 102 refers to the width (in inches) and 35 refers to the length (in feet).

=== 700 series ===
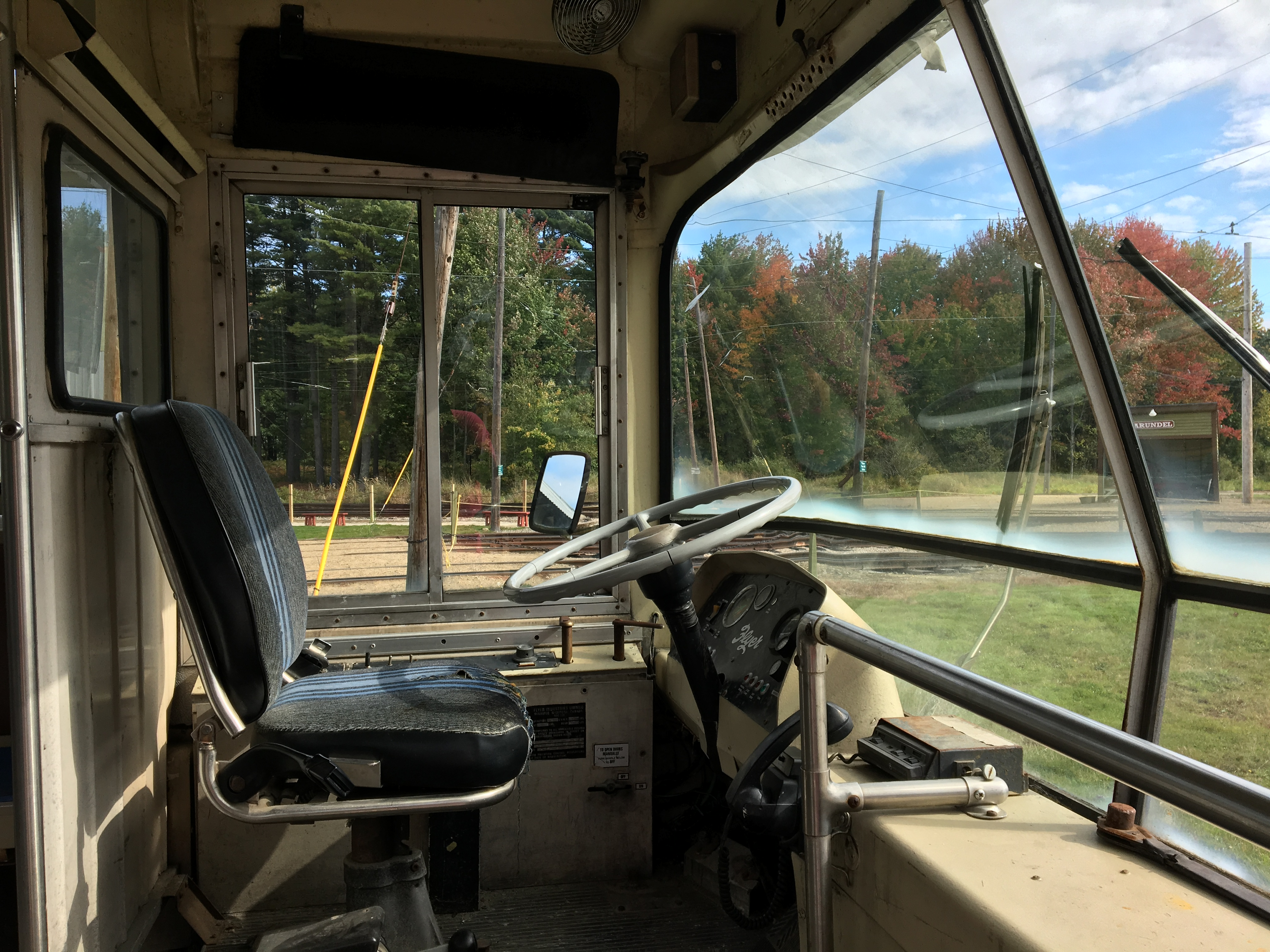
"Fishbowl" windshield on E800 at Seashore Trolley Museum. D/E700 and 800 windshields are largely identical.

Western Flyer, a small manufacturer of over-the-road coaches since 1941, diversified into the transit market in the late 1960s because the existing intercity market was too small; from 1946 to 1968, the company delivered just 693 coaches. The company created a prototype designated the D700 and sold 379 buses to several Canadian transit agencies between 1967 and 1973; regular production versions were designated D700A. The D700/D700A had similar design and styling to the popular GM New Look buses. The first D700 was sold to Winnipeg Transit in 1968. The D700 was designed with a "T" drive layout (where the rear-mounted engine is connected to the rear axle in a perpendicular orientation), as GM would not sell their patented "V" drive layout (a more compact arrangement where the engine meets the axle at an acute angle) outside the United States.

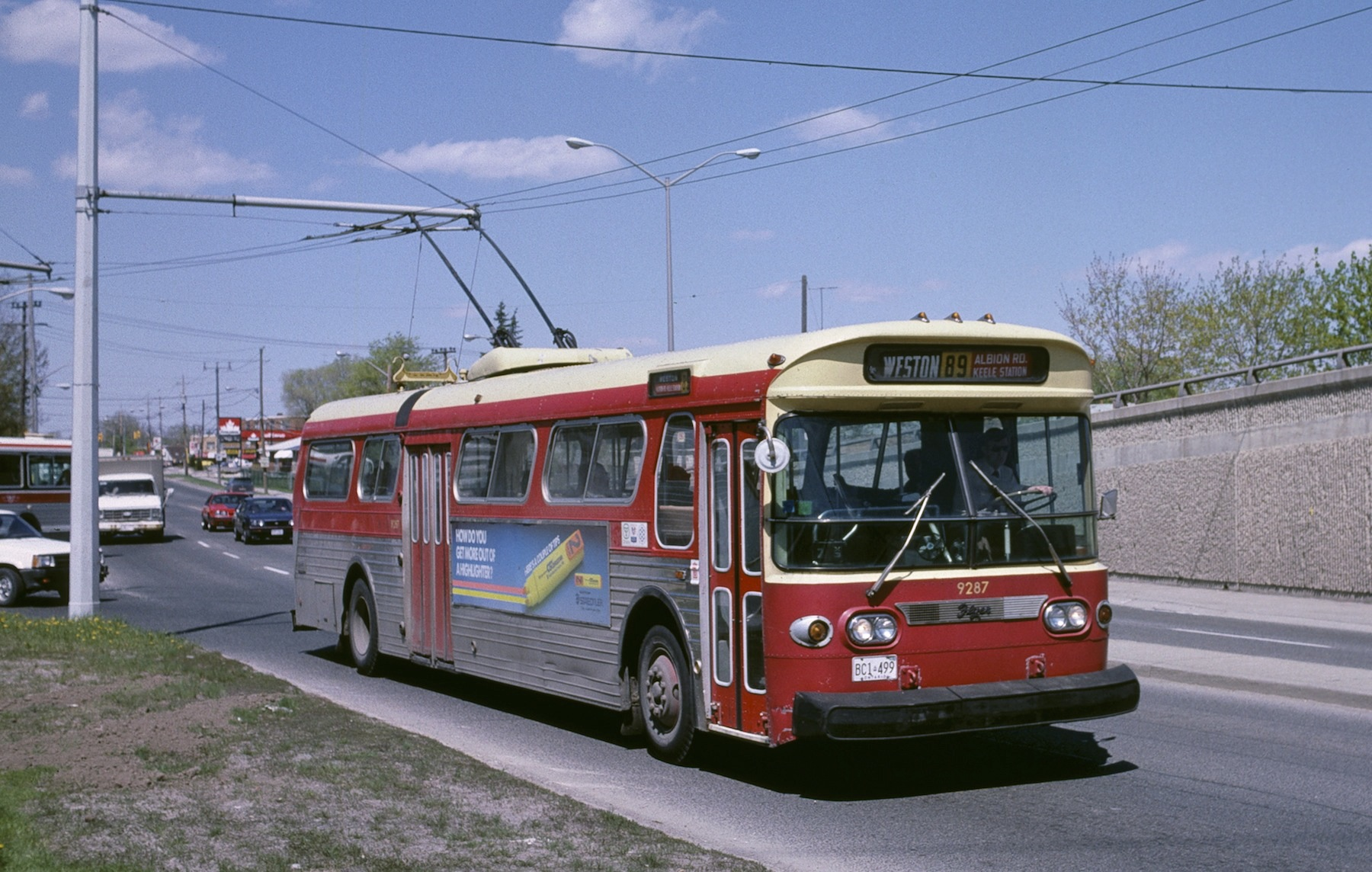
Flyer E700A in Toronto (1987). Note slanted side windows.

An electric trolleybus version was also sold as the E700; 195 were built in total, the majority (152) to the Toronto trolleybus system, and 40 to the Hamilton trolleybus system. The first E700 was sold to Toronto in 1968. At the time, Flyer was the only company still making electric trolleybuses in North America. The City Transit Company, the then-operator of the Dayton trolleybus system, purchased a single E700 body–chassis from Western Flyer in 1970 and contracted with TTC to equip it as a trolleybus using electrical equipment taken from retired Dayton trolleybuses; the 1971-built vehicle remained in use by CTC's successor, MVRTA, until the mid-1980s. Two E700s were sold to San Francisco's Muni in 1972 and served as prototypes for a later order of more than 300 E800 trolleybuses.

=== Metropolitan and 800 series ===
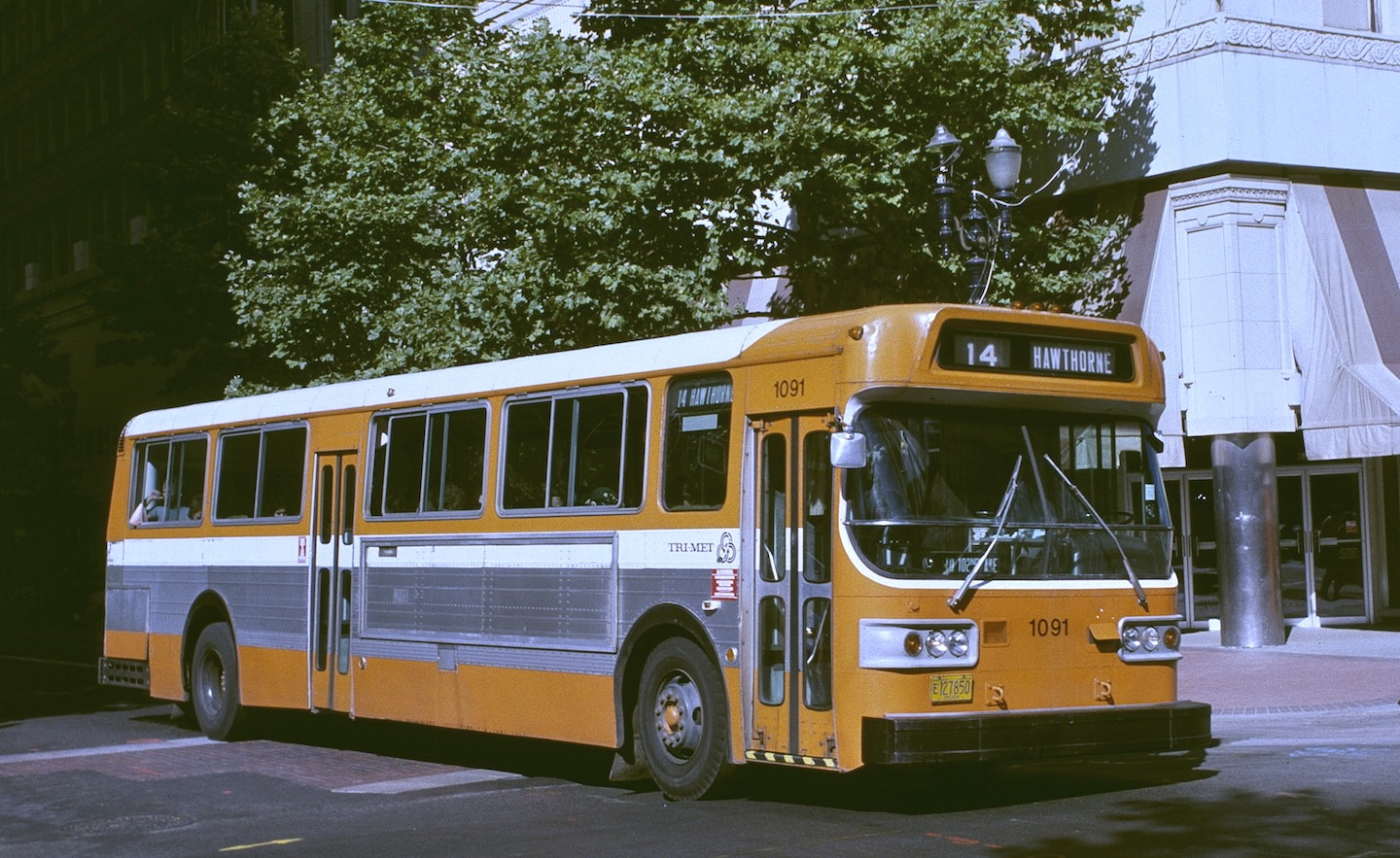
AM General Metropolitan in Portland (1984)

In 1970, Western Flyer licensed the design of the D700 to AM General. AM General had been invited to participate in the Transbus project and wanted to gain experience with transit bus production; Western Flyer wanted to enter the larger American market and due to "Buy America" requirements, needed a US-based assembler. AM General made exterior changes to the D700 design and marketed the modified design as the AM General Metropolitan; the most notable change was in the shape of the side (passenger) windows, which were rectangular rather than slanted like the New Look-derived D700. A total of 5,212 diesel-powered Metropolitans were sold to US transit agencies between 1974 and 1979. The first operator of the Metropolitan was the WMATA.

The model numbers for the Metropolitan used the total length and width along with a suffix to designate the revision; thus a 10240A was a Metropolitan that was 102 in (2,600 mm) wide and 40 ft (12 m) long, "A" (1st) revision. Changes from the original to the first ("A") revision were not distinguishable externally; the "B" revision moved the air conditioner condenser, which led to more frequent overheating of the bus. AM General also used the GM "V" drive layout instead of the original Flyer "T" drive, resulting in cracked frames after several years of service.

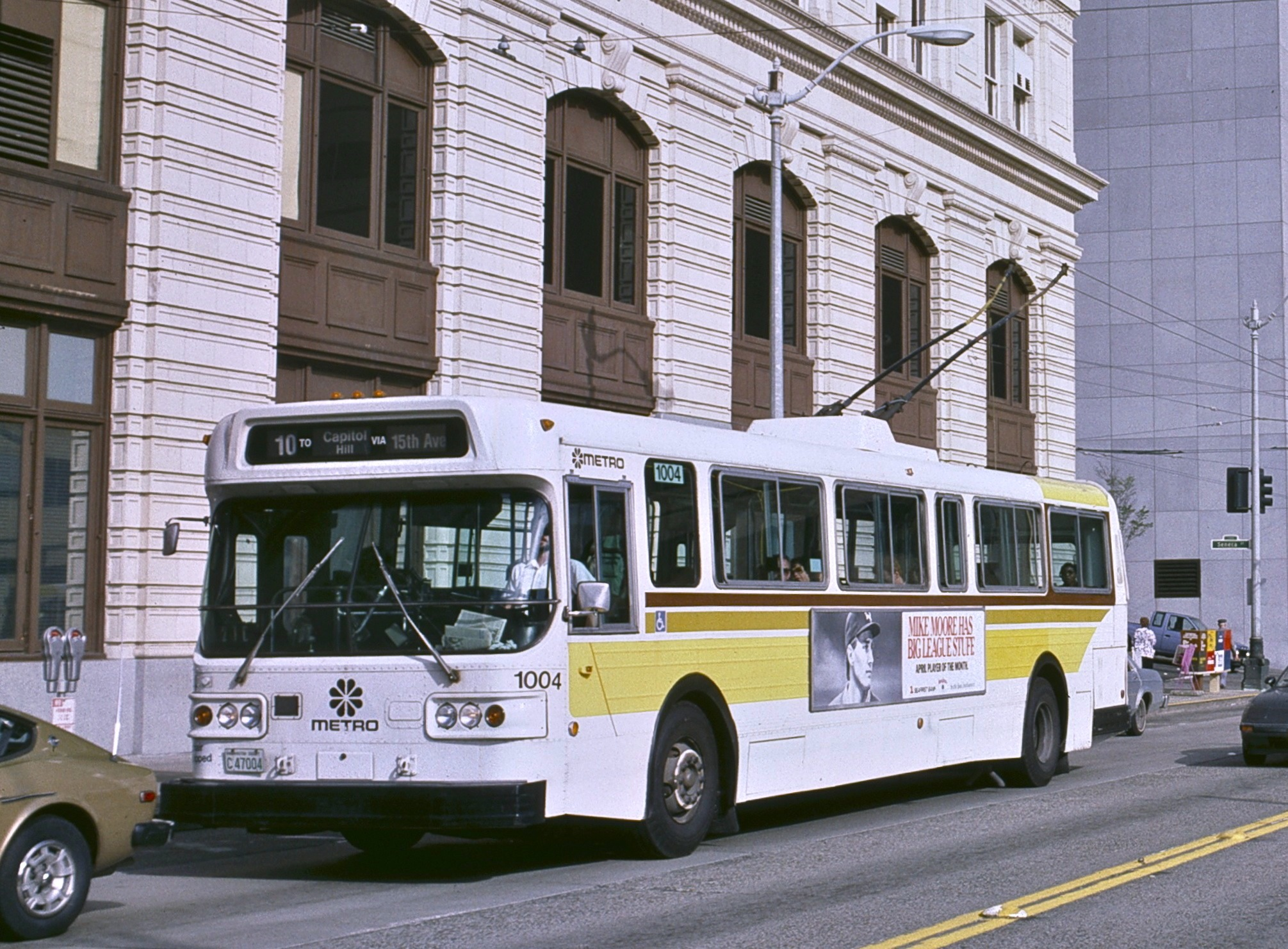
Metropolitan in Seattle (1986)

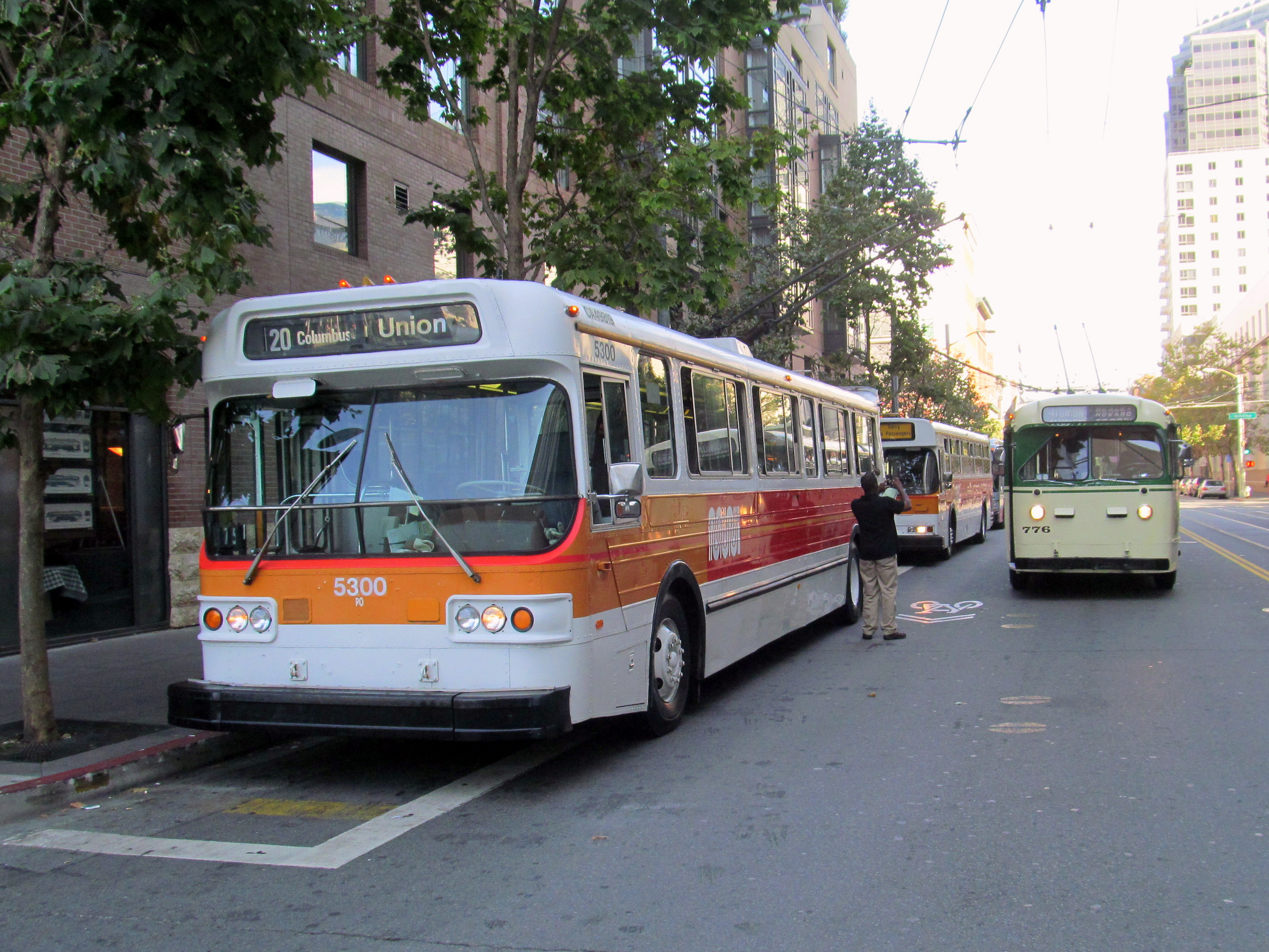
E800 in San Francisco (2017)

The E800 and Metropolitan trolleybuses had essentially identical bodies.

In 1971, the Manitoba Development Group, a government-sponsored organization, bought Western Flyer and renamed it to Flyer Industries, Ltd. Flyer Industries adopted the exterior design of the Metropolitan and began selling it on the Canadian market as the D800. 561 D800s were sold between 1974 and 1979: 86 35-foot models and 475 40-foot models.

The E800 trolleybus counterpart was also sold during this period. Edmonton Transit was the lead agency, but SF Muni (343), Miami Valley RTA (64), BC Hydro (50) and Boston MBTA (50) were the primary customers of E800 trolleybuses, purchased before the AM General Metropolitan trolleybus was available. In 1979, 219 Metropolitan trolleybuses designated 10240-T were built for Seattle Metro and SEPTA. The running gear was largely identical to the Flyer E800 but incorporating newer technology featuring the use of "chopper" control to provide smoother acceleration. The last E800 trolleybuses to operate in service anywhere did so in November 2019 in Mexico City; they were among about five that had been retrofitted in Mexico City with wheelchair lifts (at the rear door) in 1996, from a group of 37 E800s acquired used from Edmonton in 1987.

=== 900 series ===
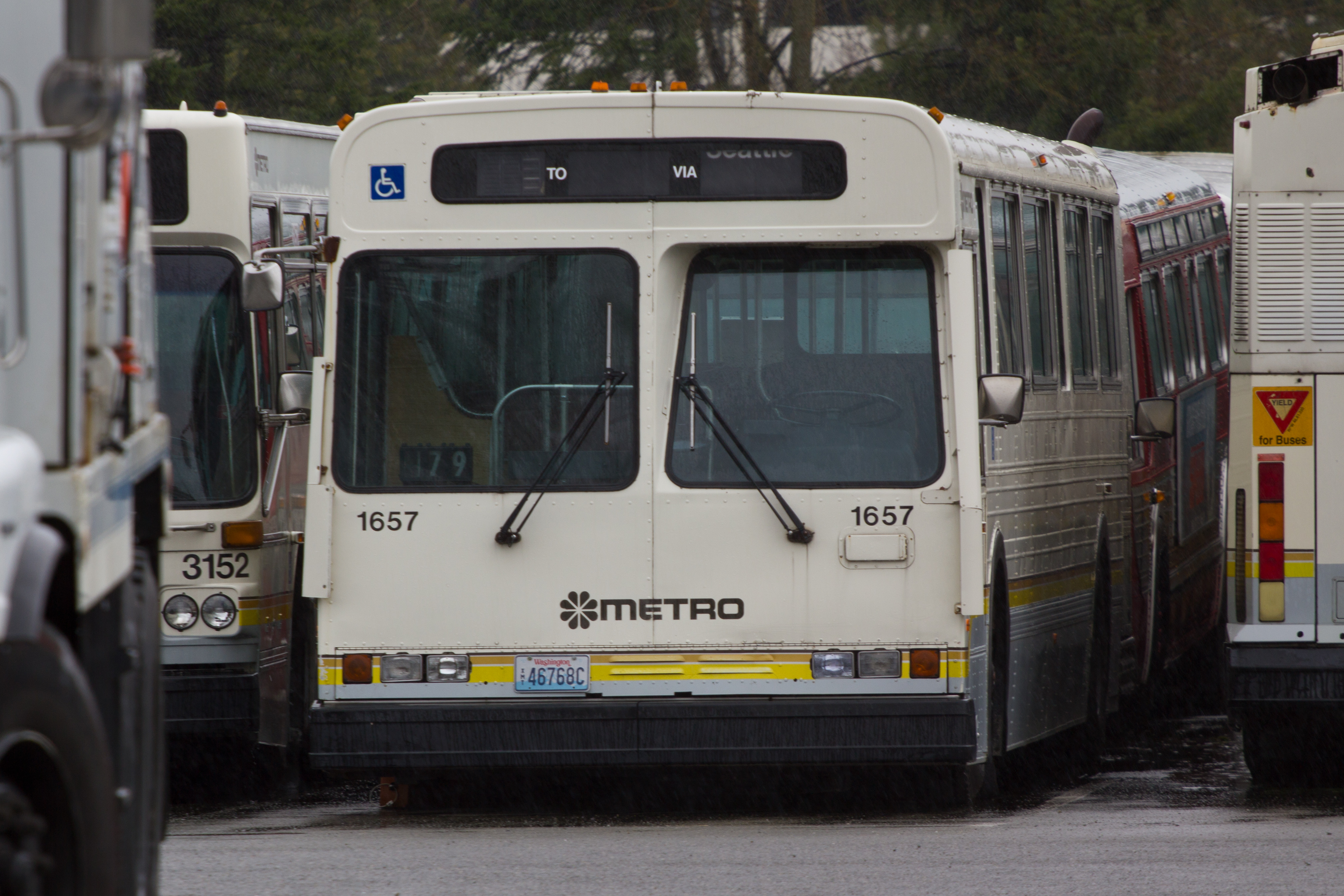
D900 (Seattle Metro)

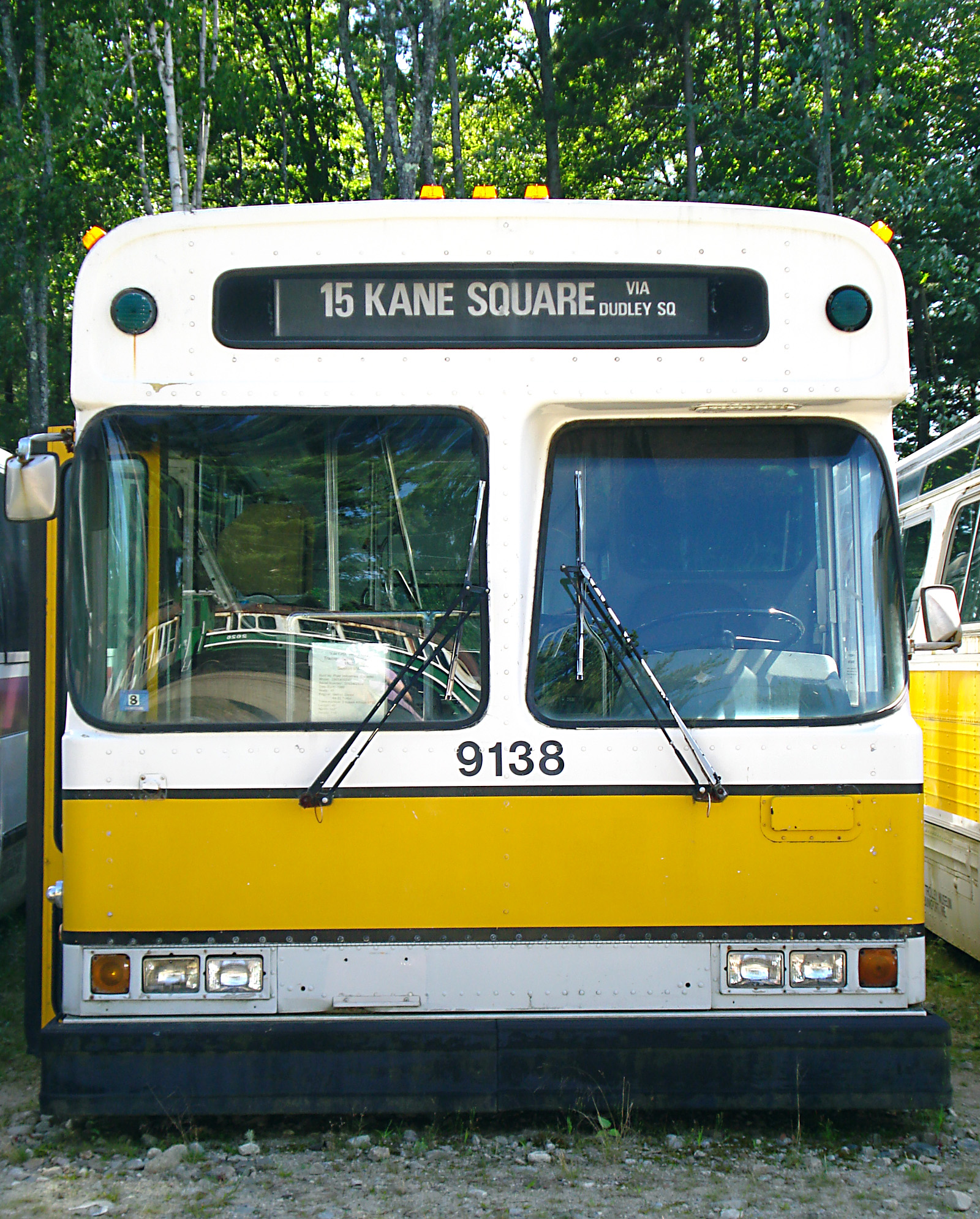
D901 (MBTA)

D900 compared to D901. Note difference in windshield shapes

The D900 was a facelifted version of the D800, with the complex "fishbowl" windshield replaced by two flat panes; the driver's side windshield was inclined to reduce glare and reflections. Sales of the D900 began in 1978, overlapping the tail end of D800 production, and continued to 1987, when the last D901 was built. The D901 modified the driver's windshield, making it curved around the side of the bus. The D901A had a slightly shortened wheelbase with a wider front door to allow simultaneous boarding and disembarking. A D902 was produced for San Francisco Muni, based on the D901A design with a modification to allow a choice of engines. A total of 1,796 D90x buses were built.

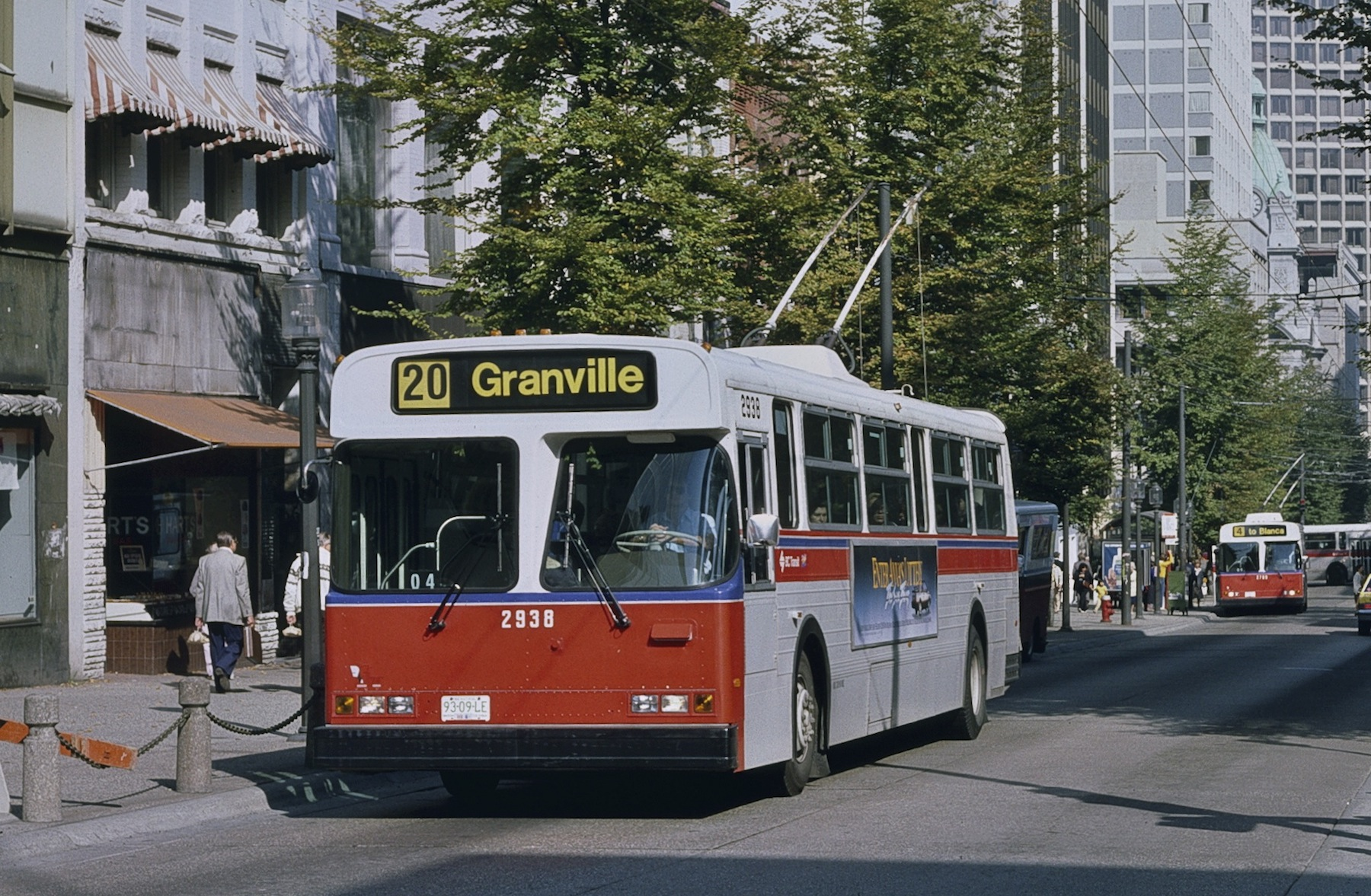
E902 in Vancouver (1985)

Like prior generations, it was also sold as a trolleybus, designated E901A for the modified driver's windshield and wider front door corresponding to the D901A, later redesignated E902 with no exterior changes. 246 were built, all for BC Transit.

== Competition ==
- GM New Look bus
- Flxible New Look bus
- Gillig Phantom
- Orion I
