= Wychwood (disambiguation) =

Wychwood, or Wychwood Forest, is an area in rural Oxfordshire, England.

Wychwood may also refer to:

- Wychwood, a 2017 novel by George Mann
- Wychwood Barns, a community centre and park in the Bracondale Hill area of Toronto
- Wychwood Brewery, Witney, Oxfordshire
- Wychwood Carhouse, informal name of the former St. Clair Carhouse, Toronto
- Wychwood Festival, an annual music festival held at Cheltenham racecourse in Gloucestershire, England
- Wychwood Park, a neighbourhood enclave and former gated community in Bracondale Hill, Toronto
- Wychwood School, an independent girls' school in Oxford, England
- Wychwood Way, a waymarked long-distance footpath in southern England
- Ulmus glabra, a species of European elm tree
