= Wychwood Park =

Coordinates: 43.67806°N 79.41933°W

- Neighbourhood
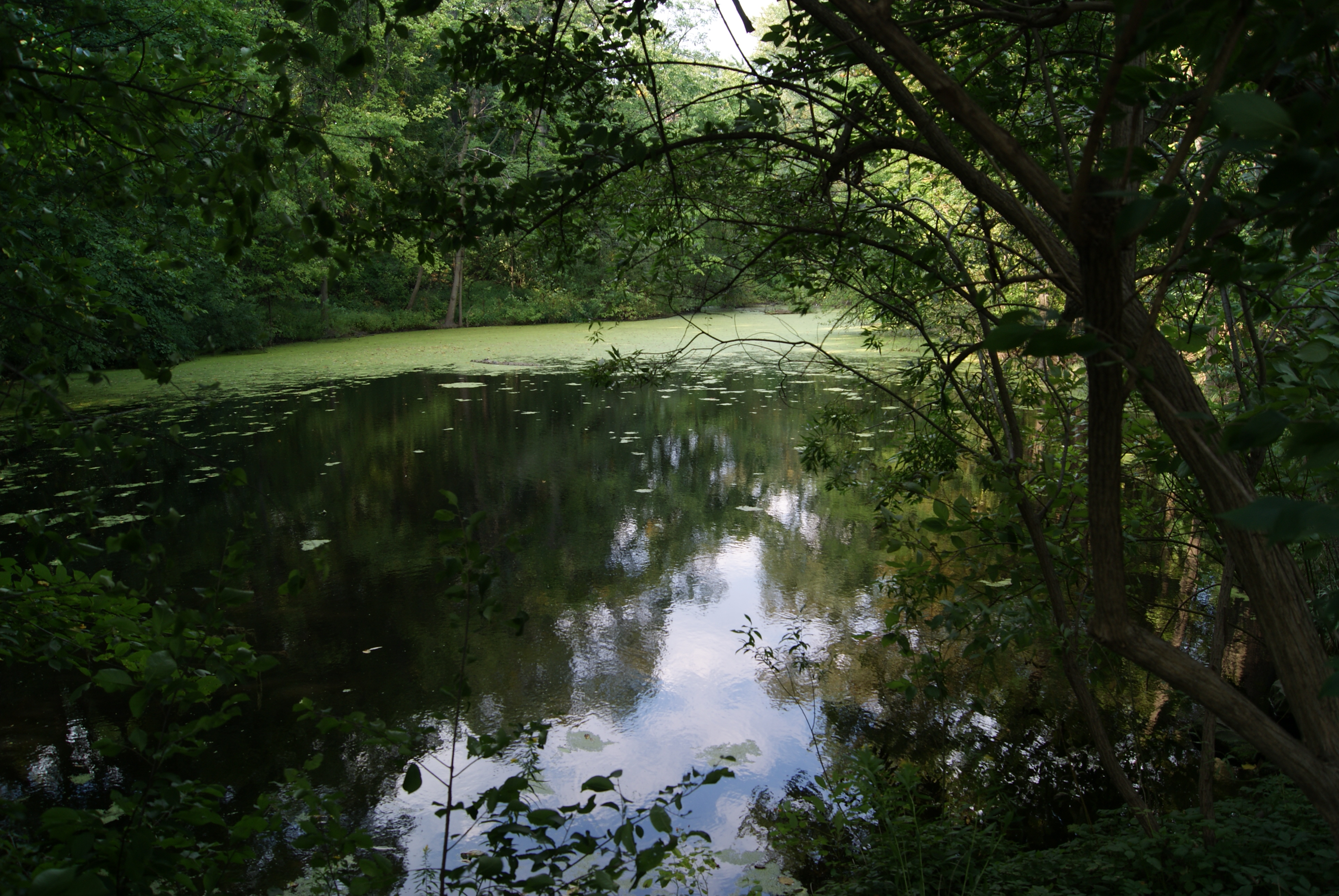
- Taddle Creek pond in Wychwood Park, 2012

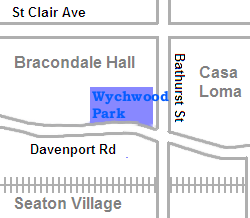
- Country: Canada
- Province: Ontario
- City: Toronto
- Established: 1792 York County
- Township: 1793 York Township
- Annexed: 1909 Toronto

Wychwood Park is a neighbourhood enclave and private community in Toronto, Ontario, Canada. It is located west of Bathurst Street on the north side of Davenport Road, within the larger area of Bracondale Hill. It is considered part of the overall Wychwood official neighbourhood as designated by the City of Toronto.

== History ==
Wychwood Park was founded as an artists' colony in the late nineteenth century, as a private project by painter Marmaduke Matthews and businessman Alexander Jardine. The area was then still a rural region on the edge of the city, and Matthews planned out a picturesque community that he named after Wychwood forest in Oxfordshire, England.

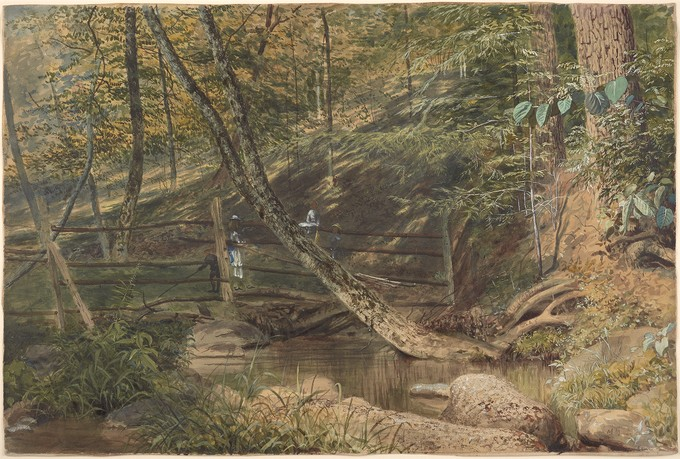
Painting of Wychwood Park by Marmaduke Matthews, c. 1895

The land was divided into irregularly shaped lots, with a central park built around a pond and tennis courts designed by the architect Arthur Edwin Whatmough, and there were careful restrictions upon what could be built in the community. Whatmough designed many of the houses that were built in the Arts and Crafts style. Some of the others were designed by prominent architect Eden Smith, including his own home at number 5 Wychwood Park, which he built around 1906.

One of Toronto's ravines ran through the heart of the neighbourhood, and this was preserved as parkland. Taddle Creek ran through the ravine, and it was dammed to create a large pond in the middle of the park. This is now one of the few places in the city where Taddle Creek is still visible above ground.

While the area was amalgamated into the city of Toronto in 1909, Wychwood Park remains a private community, with approximately sixty houses. Wychwood Park's private roads and amenities are paid for by the local residents, and the community is managed by an executive council.

Wychwood Park is one of Toronto's more expensive neighbourhoods, with house prices well over a million dollars. A number of prominent people have lived in the community over the years, including Marshall McLuhan (at 3 Wychwood Park), George Agnew Reid (at 81 Wychwood Park), Sir William Gage (at 82 Wychwood Park) and Anatol Rapoport. In 1985, Wychwood Park became the first residential zone in Ontario to be granted heritage status when it was designated as a Heritage Conservation District under the Ontario Heritage Act.

The Wychwood Barns site, a former Toronto Transit Commission streetcar maintenance facility located to the north of Wychwood Park, was transformed into a community park in 2008. The original maintenance buildings (the St. Clair Carhouse) on the site were converted into a mixed-use community facility at that time.
