= Rogers Road streetcar line =

Former Toronto streetcar line

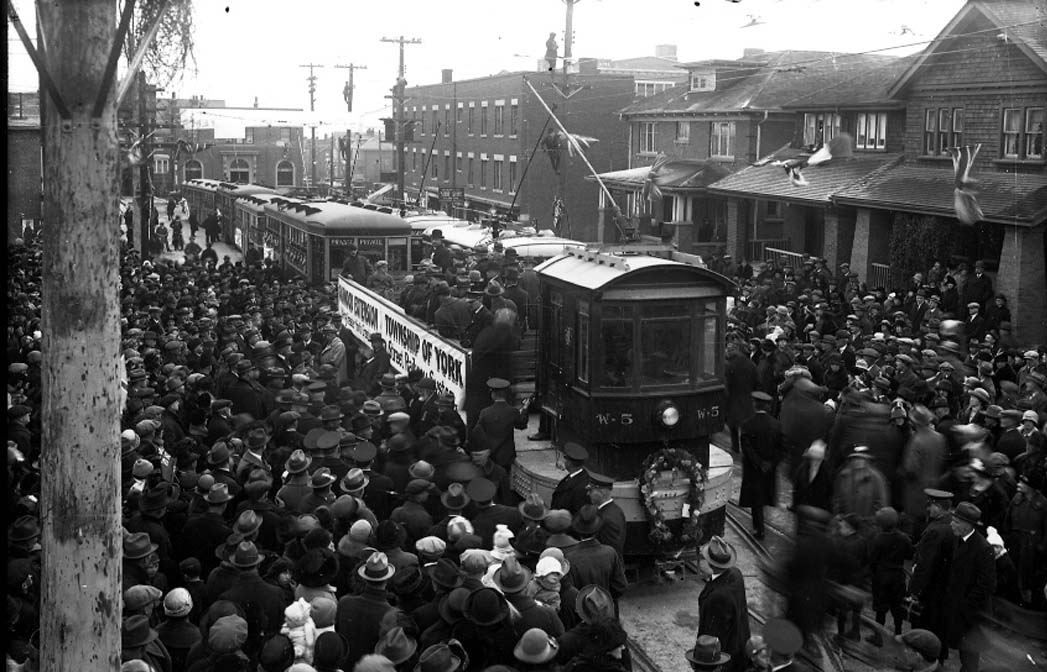
The Rogers Road route was opened on November 19, 1924.

The Rogers Road streetcar line was a streetcar line that operated mainly within the Township of York (later the Borough of York, today a district within the City of Toronto) from 1924 to 1974. The line was owned by the Township of York Railways, which in turn was owned by its namesake municipality. The Township of York Railways contracted with the Toronto Transportation Commission, later the Toronto Transit Commission (TTC), to operate the line.

The Rogers Road line opened on the same day in 1924 as the Oakwood streetcar line which shared the same tracks between St. Clair Avenue and Rogers Road along Oakwood Avenue. As with the Rogers Road line, the Oakwood line was owned by the Township of York Railways and operated by the TTC; it operated north from St. Clair Avenue to Eglinton Avenue where it turned west to Gilbert Loop at Gilbert Avenue. The Oakwood line closed in 1960.

== Timeline ==
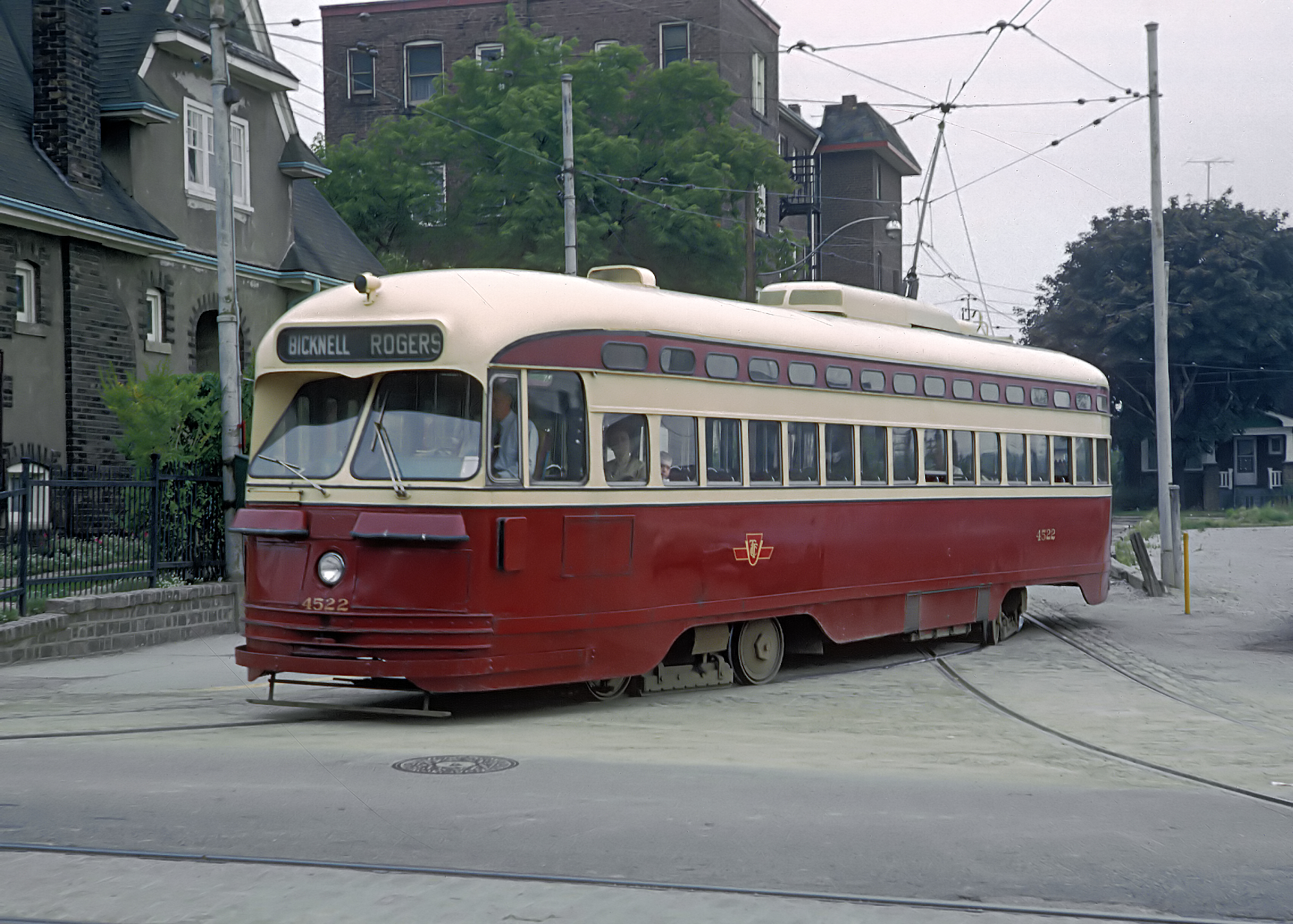
Rogers streetcar leaving Oakwood Loop heading to Bicknell Loop

The Rogers streetcar began operating on November 19, 1924. The initial route ran north from St. Clair Avenue (Oakwood Loop), along Oakwood Avenue and turned west at Rogers Road, continuing to Dufferin Street. The TTC used bidirectional Birney streetcars inherited from the Toronto Civic Railways, which used a crossover at Dufferin Street to change direction. Service excluded Sundays and holidays.

On January 4, 1925, the TTC inaugurated Sunday and holiday service on the line. On August 29, 1925, the Rogers Road line was extended to Bicknell Loop, located just east of Weston Road on Bicknell Avenue.

On November 4, 1926, the TTC introduced one-man, unidirectional streetcars inherited from the Toronto Street Railway during rush hours. This supplemented the Birney streetcars in base service. On May 24, 1927, former TRC streetcars fully replaced the Birneys.

On August 1, 1947, small Peter Witt streetcars replaced the TRC streetcars. On September 7, 1952, PCC streetcars replaced the Peter Witts.

On July 1, 1954, the Rogers line became part of the TTC's one-fare system eliminating the separate York Township fare.

On May 16, 1955, after the opening of the Yonge Subway in 1954, Rogers streetcars were extended eastward from Oakwood to St. Clair Station during rush hour.

The final Rogers Road streetcar travelled east to the St. Clair Carhouse on July 19, 1974. Beginning on July 21, 1974, the route was replaced by the 63F Ossington trolley bus line, which ran from King Street to the Bicknell Loop. In the brief interim, diesel buses were temporarily operated. The 48 Humber Blvd route provided service west of Bicknell Loop to Jane Street.

== Demise ==
Several reasons are given for the demise of the Rogers Road streetcar. The Borough of York (formerly the Township of York) wanted to extend Rogers Road service across Weston Road to Humber Boulevard and Jane Street, but the TTC said this was not possible using streetcars. (Buses would not provide such a route until 1994.) The Borough also wanted to repair Rogers Road but was unwilling to pay the cost of repairing the streetcar tracks. In 1972, Toronto City council decided to retain all streetcar service within the City of Toronto, but that excluded the Rogers Road streetcar line since it was in the Borough of York. Terminating the streetcar line would free up streetcars to act as spares while the TTC was rebuilding its aging PCC fleet. The TTC considered the conversion of the Rogers streetcar to trolley bus operation to be ideal; the streetcar already followed a trolley bus line on Oakwood Avenue between Oakwood Loop and Rogers Road.

At its peak, the Rogers streetcar had a frequency of every 3 minutes. Towards its end, the frequency fell to every 5 minutes, as the north–south 29 Dufferin and 41 Keele bus routes were funneling riders south to the Bloor-Danforth subway.

Soon after closure, the streetcar tracks east of Old Weston Road were removed, but streetcar tracks remained visible in the street between Bicknell Loop and Old Weston Road until 2000. In 1992, the trolley buses on Rogers Road were replaced by diesel buses. In October 2020, all remaining bus services using Bicknell Loop were extended to Avon Loop at Weston Road. Bicknell Loop was sold off and was replaced by a housing development on its site in 2017.
