= Marmaduke Matthews =

English-Canadian painter

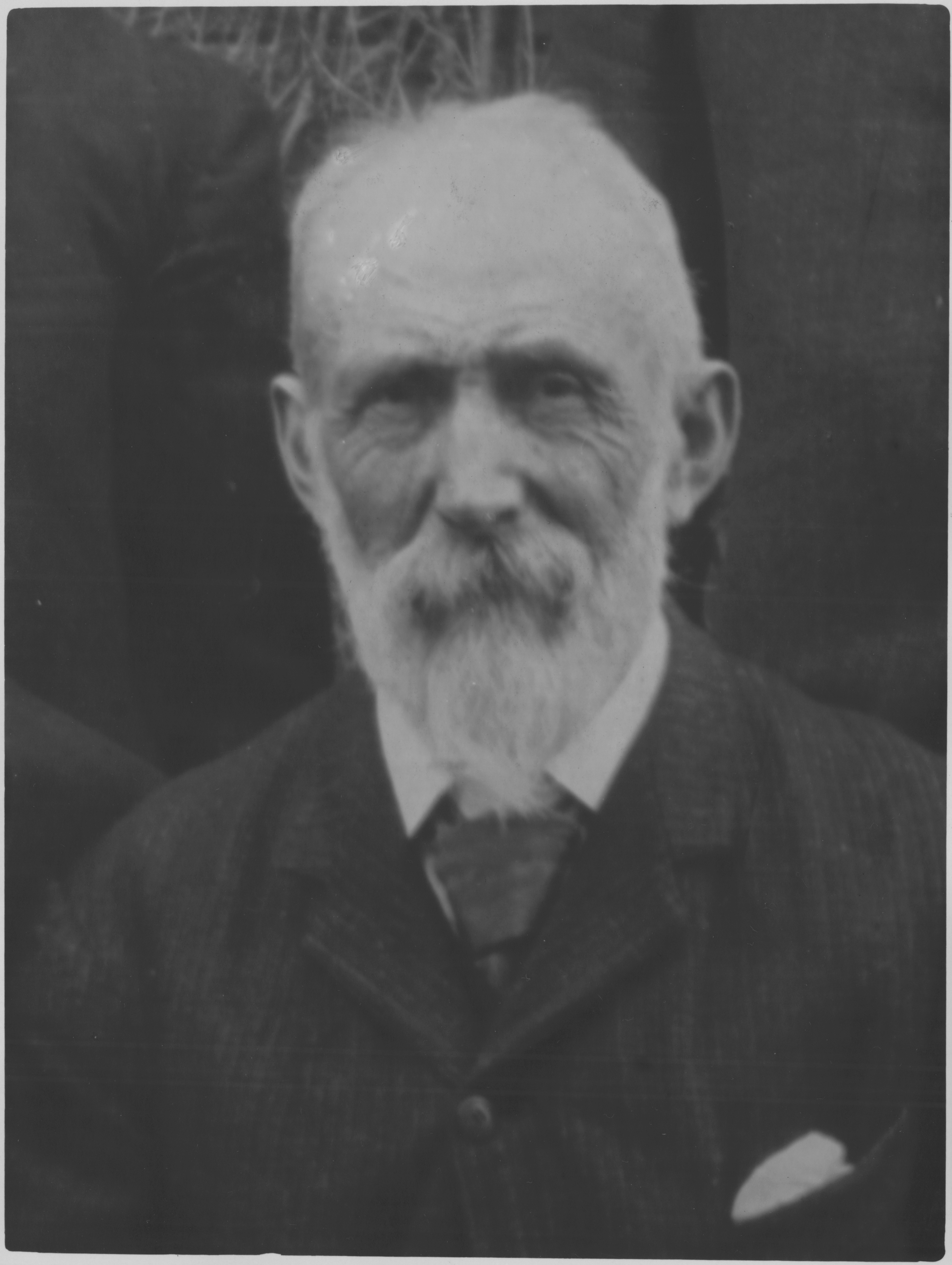
- Born: Marmaduke Matthews; 29 August 1837; Barcheston, Warwickshire, United Kingdom
- Died: 24 September 1913 (aged 76); Toronto, Canada
- Education: Cowley School, Oxford, and London University, later, in London, England, with Thomas Miles Richardson Jr., a watercolour artist from Oxford
- Known for: Painter

Marmaduke Matthews RCA (29 August 1837 – 24 September 1913) was an English-Canadian painter, born in Barcheston, Warwickshire, England.

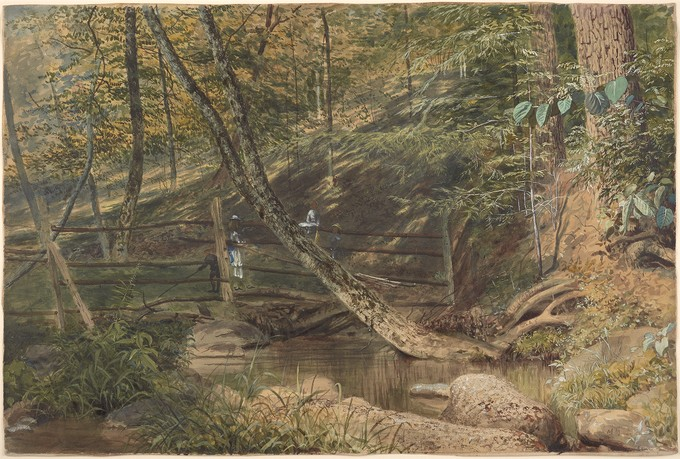
Wychwood Park (c. 1895)

== Career ==
Matthews studied watercolour painting at Oxford, England before moving to Toronto, Canada in 1860 to embark on a career as a painter of landscapes. He was hired by the Canadian Pacific Railway to paint the Canadian prairies and rocky mountains. He worked for William van Horne, then-president of the Canadian Pacific Railway, and made several cross-country trips to Canada's west, including in 1887, 1889 and 1892. He reportedly drew his sketches from the cowcatcher of a locomotive.

He is also notable for playing a founding role in the Ontario Society of Artists and the Royal Canadian Academy of Arts as a watercolour painter. In Toronto, he is affectionately remembered as the creator of Wychwood Park in 1874 - a plot of land that he once lived on, that became an artists' community and is now one of the higher-income neighbourhoods located northwest of downtown Toronto.

Matthews died in Toronto on 24 September 1913. His works are included in the permanent collection of the National Gallery of Canada, the Art Gallery of Ontario, and the Robert McLaughlin Gallery.

== Bibliography ==
- MacDonald, Colin (1967). A Dictionary of Canadian Artists, vol. 4 (Third ed.). Ottawa: Paperbacks.
