= Trolley buses in Toronto =

Former transit system in Ontario, Canada

Toronto trolley bus system
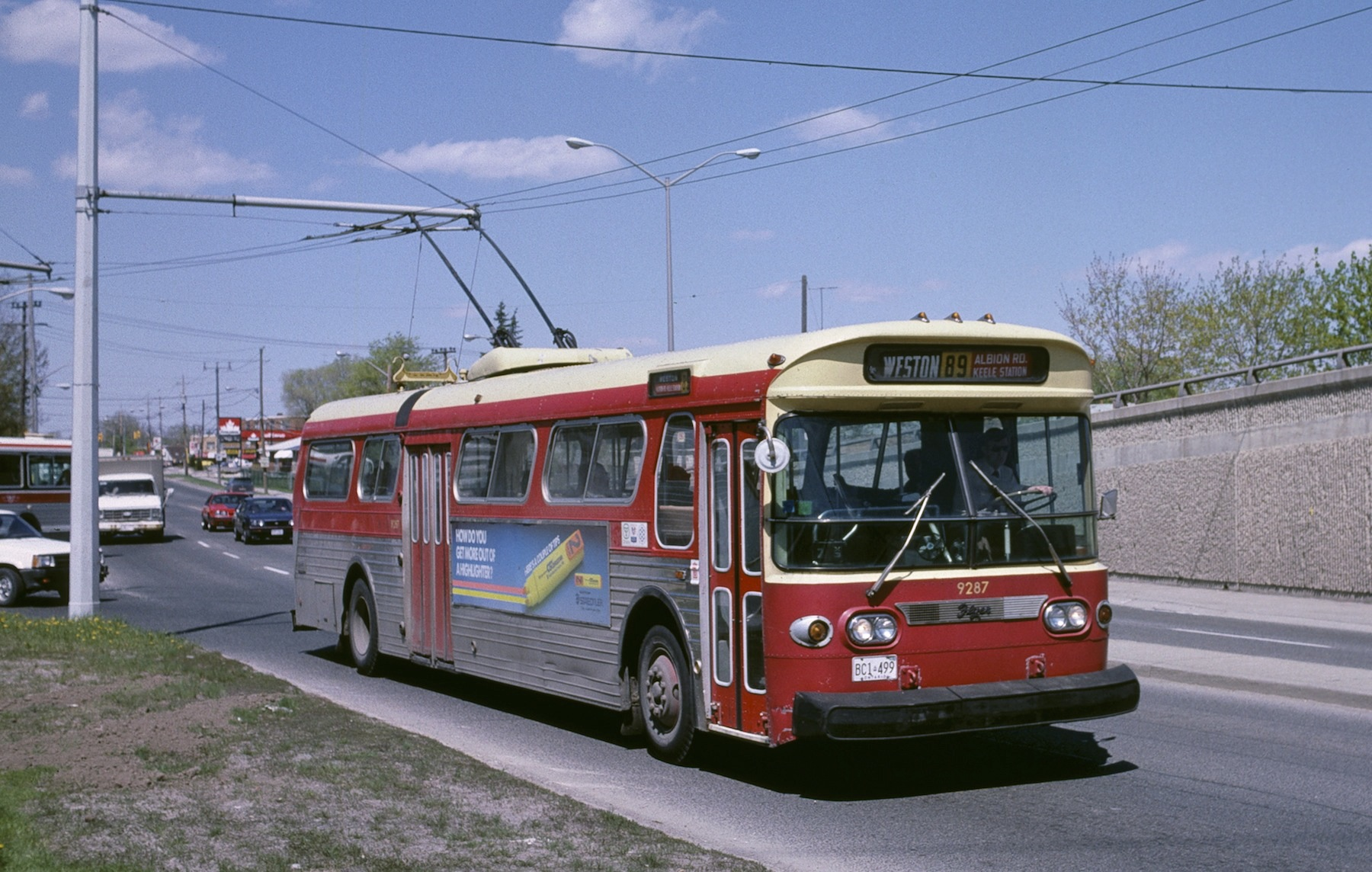
- A Toronto Flyer E700A trolley bus in 1987

Operation
- Locale: Toronto, Ontario, Canada

Statistics
First era: 1922–1925
- Routes: 1
- Operator: Toronto Transportation Commission
- Stock: 4 trolley buses
- Route length: 1.2 mi (1.9 km)
Second era: 1947–1993
- Routes: 10
- Operators: Toronto Transportation Commission (1947–1953); Toronto Transit Commission (1954–1993)
- Stock: 153 trolley buses (at max.)
- Route length: Approx. 33.7 miles (54.2 km) (1987)

The Toronto trolley bus system formed part of the public transport network of the city of Toronto, Ontario, Canada. Trolley buses originally served the city on a short route that lasted only from 1922 to 1925. Later, a much larger system operated from 1947 to 1993. Owned by the Toronto Transportation Commission, the original line operated in the northern part of the city, using short trolley buses with solid rubber tires and wooden seats. It was seen as a cost-saving alternative to construction of an extension of the city's streetcar system. Ridership was relatively strong, and the route was replaced by a streetcar extension in 1925.

The second trolley bus system opened in 1947 and within 15 months had grown to four routes. Additional new routes and extensions were constructed in subsequent decades, often in conjunction with the opening of new sections of the Toronto subway system. By 1954, the network had six routes, served by a fleet of around 150 trolley buses. In 1967, the Toronto Transit Commission (TTC), employed a cost-saving approach to renew its aging trolley bus fleet: transferring the electrical equipment (such as traction motors and control systems) from its 1947–1953 vehicles into new bodyshells, with 151 such vehicles built by Flyer Industries and the TTC between 1970 and 1972. The TTC program had the effect of reviving the dormant North American trolley-bus manufacturing industry, with Flyer going on to build trolley buses for several other Canadian and American transit systems.

By 1977, the Toronto trolley bus system had added three more routes and closed one route. In the early 1980s, plans were tentatively approved for a major expansion of the system, but ultimately they did not come to fruition. In 1983, the TTC instead began to consider phasing-out trolley bus service, but differences of opinion among the commissioners and between the commission and the TTC staff repeatedly delayed firm action on either expansion or elimination. While that discussion continued, in 1989 the transit agency leased 40 younger trolley buses from Edmonton to allow its current service to be maintained despite a need to retire some of its worn-out older vehicles.

In late 1991, a major budget crisis at the provincial government and the TTC, exacerbated by the early 1990s recession, led to a decision by the TTC to close the entire trolley bus system, and this took place in January 1992. However, in the face of strong opposition to the move among the public and several of the commissioners, in June 1992 the commission decided to reopen the system, on at least two routes, and trolley bus operation returned to routes 4 and 6 that September. The long-term future of the system remained under debate in 1993, but the lease of the 40 Edmonton trolley buses was due to expire in July 1993, and ultimately the commission voted 4-to-3 not to renew it. Trolley bus service ended for a second time in mid-July 1993. Studies in 1994 looked into the feasibility of reviving the service, but no decision to do so was ever made.

== First system ==
Toronto's first trolley bus system opened on June 19, 1922, and comprised a 1.9-kilometre-long (1.2 mi) route from Merton Street near Yonge Street along Merton Street and Mount Pleasant Road to Eglinton Avenue. The Toronto Transportation Commission had become responsible for public transportation in the Mount Pleasant area upon the commission's formation in 1921, and was asked by residents to extend streetcar service to the area. The TTC considered the area's population to be too small to justify the expense of constructing and operating a streetcar line but promised to introduce a less costly type of electric transit, choosing the trolley bus. Four newly built trolley buses were purchased to provide the service, which used three vehicles during rush hour. Numbered 20 to 23, the 29-seat trolley buses were built by the J. G. Brill Company on frames made by the Packard Motor Car Company and fitted with Westinghouse motors. They were 8 metres (26 ft 2 in) long and had solid rubber tires and wooden seats. As delivered, they each had a single trolley pole that forked at the top to connect with the two (positive and negative) trolley wires, but by the time of the line's opening they had been retrofitted with the more conventional double trolley poles.

Most of the route ran along unpaved streets. At both ends of the line, the overhead wires ended in a wye, a triangular configuration requiring a streetcar or trolley bus to back up for a short ways when turning around, but in June 1923, a loop was constructed at the route's south end, running via Yonge Street and Balliol Street, and was brought into use on June 17. The same month, an extension of the route at its other end was opened. From the original wye terminus at Mount Pleasant Road, this ran west along Eglinton Avenue and Yonge Street to the TTC's Eglinton Carhouse. The service was heavily used. Using just three 29-seat vehicles during peak hours (and two at other times), it carried an average of 1,700 riders a day, which by 1925 was sufficient to convince the TTC that extension of its streetcar system to the area was warranted. Trolley bus service operated for the last time on August 31, 1925, as construction of the streetcar extension progressed, and the new section of the St. Clair streetcar line along Mt. Pleasant Road to Eglinton Avenue opened for service on November 3, 1925. The overhead wires of the trolley bus line were removed. The four vehicles were stored, and in 1928 were sold for scrap, but one was found on a farm in the 1970s and was acquired by the Halton County Radial Railway museum, to be preserved and restored.

== Second system ==
=== Routes ===
Almost 22 years after closure of the first system, the first route of Toronto's second trolley bus system opened, on June 19, 1947, serving Lansdowne Avenue. The system would eventually grow to ten routes, although no more than nine were in operation concurrently. Routes were unnumbered until 1956.

Toronto trolley bus routes (1947–1993)
Route number and name	First day as trolley bus	Itinerary at maximum	Last day as trolley bus	Notes
4 – Annette	Dec 8, 1947	Jane station – St. George station	Jul 11, 1993	
6 – Bay	Sep 5, 1976	Dupont St. and Bedford Rd. – Jarvis St. & Queens Quay	Jul 16, 1993	"Last day" date refers to the service day. Last trolley bus in service (9151) arrived back at garage at 1:29 a.m. on July 17.
40 – Junction	May 11, 1968	Runnymede Loop – Dundas West station	Aug 3, 1991	Trolley bus operation had been temporarily suspended because of road construction at the time of TTC's decision to close the entire system.
47 – Lansdowne	Jun 19, 1947	Earlscourt Loop – Queen St.	Jan 3, 1992	
61 – Nortown	Mar 7, 1954	Roe Loop – Eglinton station – Doncliffe Loop	Dec 27, 1991	The route's eastern half was split into a separate route, 103 Nortown East, in April 1985 and the western half was renamed 61 Nortown West.
63 – Ossington	Dec 8, 1947	King St. & Crawford St. – Eglinton West station	Jan 10, 1992	Branch along Rogers Road to Bicknell Loop opened July 22, 1974.
74 – Mt. Pleasant	Nov 20, 1977	St. Clair station – Mt. Pleasant Loop	Dec 28, 1991	
89 – Weston Road	Sep 15, 1948	Keele station – Albion Rd.	Jan 3, 1992	
97 – Yonge	Mar 27, 1954	Eglinton station – Glen Echo Loop (via Yonge St.)	Apr 3, 1973	
103 – Nortown East	Mar 7, 1954 (as part of route 61)	Eglinton station – Doncliffe Loop (via Mt. Pleasant Rd.)	Dec 28, 1991	Name and number established April 21, 1985, as a renumbering of the eastern half of route 61 Nortown.

=== Formation and early expansion ===
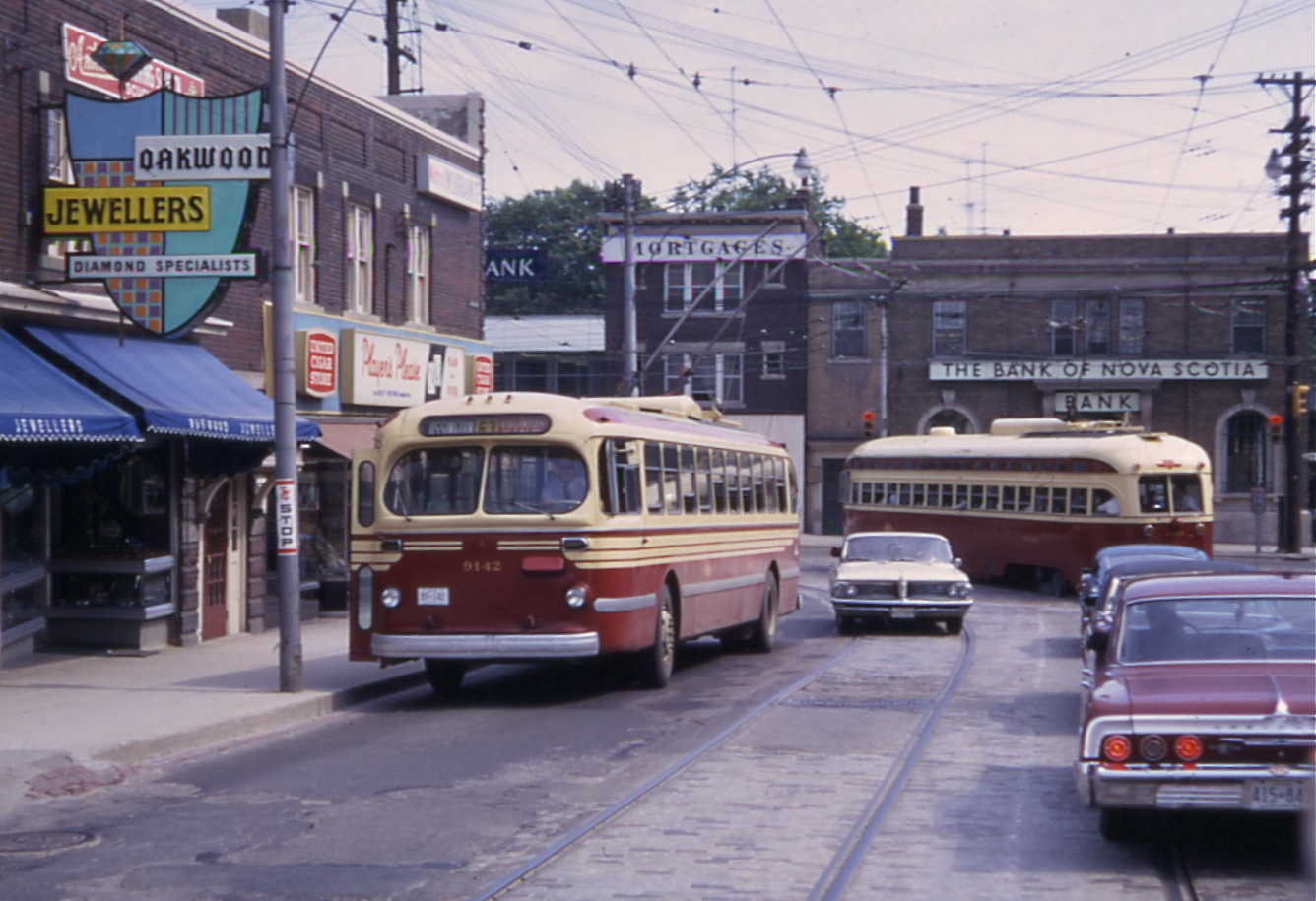
A CCF–Brill trolley bus on the Ossington route, passing a PCC streetcar

During the period when the original route closed, the TTC was focused on reorganizing and re-equipping its large streetcar system. Not until the close of World War II did the TTC decide to again invest in trolley bus technology, with plans announced in 1946 to construct three trolley bus lines. The Lansdowne route was a conversion of a streetcar line, the Annette route was newly formed from portions of multiple streetcar and bus routes, and the Ossington route replaced parts of two streetcar lines and one bus line. Until 1956, TTC routes were unnumbered, designated only by names.

The first trolley bus route of the new system, Lansdowne, opened on June 19, 1947. The Annette and Ossington routes opened on October 6, 1947, and December 8, 1947, respectively. All were busy routes. The Ossington route, in particular, carried around 3,400 riders per hour in the afternoon rush hour and was believed to be the most heavily used trolley bus route in North America. Less than a year later, in September 1948, the Weston Road route became the fourth trolley bus route to open, replacing a streetcar line.

To serve the new routes, the TTC purchased 85 trolley buses (initial order of 25, later expanded) from the Canadian Car & Foundry company, which built them using designs licensed by the U.S.-based ACF-Brill company. They were model T-44. The first vehicle was delivered in February 1947, and the full series was numbered 9000–9084 in TTC's fleet.

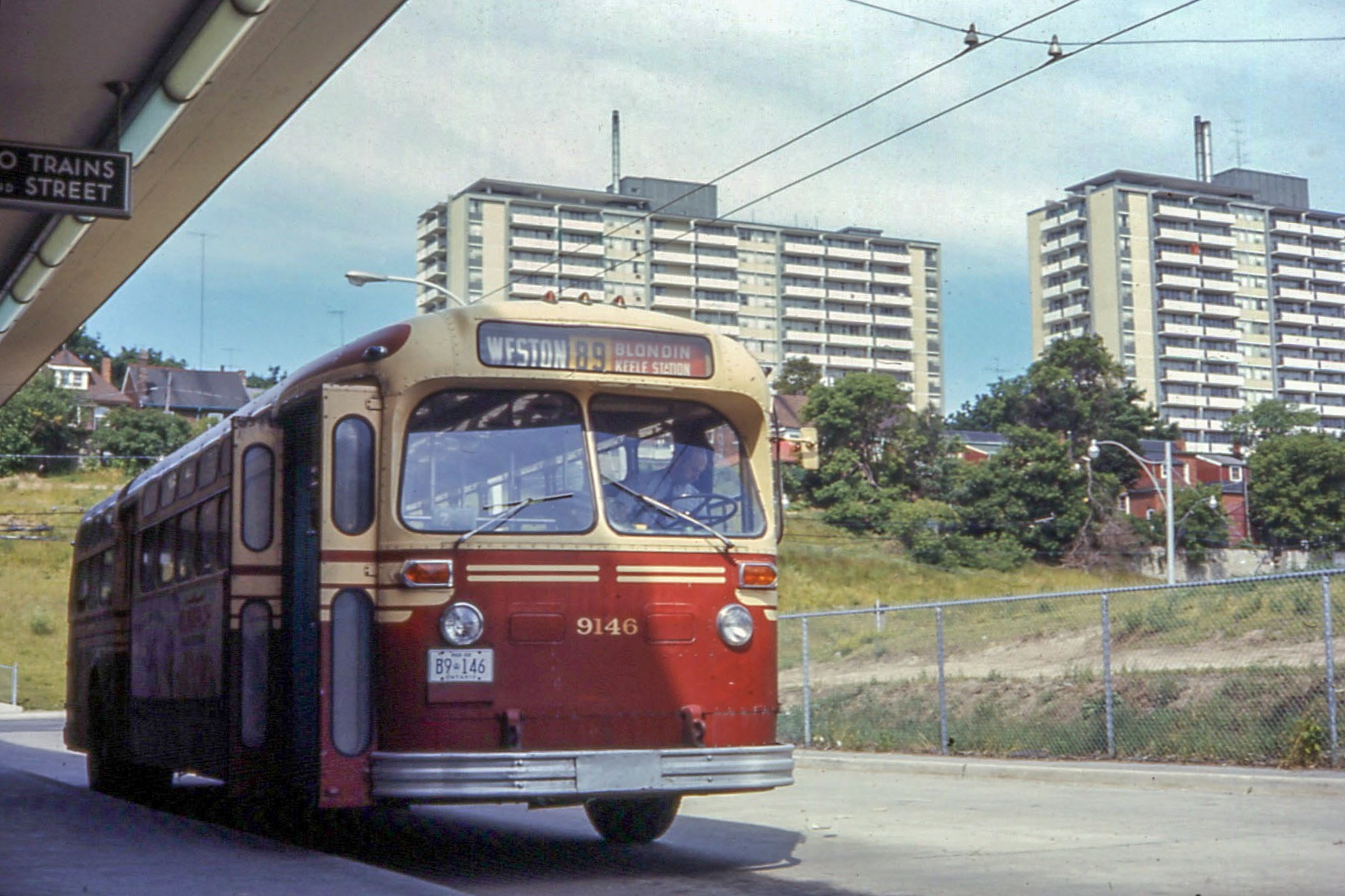
One of the used Marmon-Herrington trolley buses the TTC acquired in 1963

The Weston Road route was extended in 1949 and again in 1959. A fifth route, Nortown (later numbered 61), was opened on March 7, 1954, replacing a motor bus route—the first trolley bus line of the second system that did not replace any part of a streetcar line. Later the same month, on March 27, 1954, the portion of the Yonge Street streetcar line north of Eglinton Avenue was converted to trolley buses, as the Yonge route (later numbered 97). These two new routes were physically isolated from the system's other trolley bus routes, with no wires connecting the two. Their vehicles were based at the TTC's Eglinton Garage, whereas the other routes were all operated out of Lansdowne Garage.

To serve the expanded system, the TTC purchase another 40 CCF–Brill trolley buses, this time of a slightly large model, the T-48A, along with 15 Marmon-Herrington units acquired used from the Cincinnati trolley bus system. The now six-route system had 22.9 miles (36.9 km) route miles and a fleet of 149 vehicles.

In 1956, the TTC adopted a route-numbering scheme and the six trolley bus routes were numbered 4, 40, 47, 61, 63, and 97 (as listed in the table above). For planned route extensions, a few additional used trolley buses were acquired over the next few years, with five CCF–Brills from Ottawa in 1959 and eight Marmon-Herringtons from Cleveland in 1963.

=== 1960s extensions ===
Route 63 Ossington was extended northwards, into the town of York, on January 2, 1960, replacing the Oakwood streetcar line. The east end of route 4 Annette had originally been at Christie Loop, at Dupont and Christie streets, but with the opening of the University subway line in February 1963 the route was extended east and south to St. George subway station, replacing the Dupont streetcar line. Route 63's northern terminus had been on Eglinton Avenue at Gilbert Avenue (Gilbert Loop), but in June 1964, the route was cut back to Oakwood and Eglinton, the first retrenchment of the system. However, expansions of Toronto's subway system continued to precipitate expansion of the trolley bus system, through extensions and new routes. In conjunction with a 1968 extension of the Bloor–Danforth subway line, new trolley bus route 40 Junction was opened on May 11, 1968. More extensions followed in the 1970s (see section below).

The TTC followed a practice of displaying a suffix letter after the route number on the vehicles' destination signs for short-turn trips. Examples included 6A and 6B for such trips on route 6. On route 63, northbound trips going only as far as St. Clair Avenue were shown as 63A, while northbound route 89 trips turning short at Church Street were shown as 89A. A letter suffix was also used for the Rogers Road branch of route 63, shown as 63F, even though it was an alternate northbound destination rather than a short turn.

=== Fleet renewal ===
By the mid-1960s, the TTC began to consider renewing its trolley bus fleet, as the existing fleet had an average age of almost 20 years and was showing "severe" body wear. However, with several trolley bus systems closing in the 1950s and 1960, the North American trolley bus manufacturing industry had effectively disappeared over the previous 10 years. Not since 1954 had any new trolley buses been built in North America for a North American system, and since Marmon-Herrington's completion of an order for Recife, Brazil, in 1959, there had been no production of trolley buses on the continent at all. Trolley bus production continued in Europe, but acquiring vehicles from there was considered prohibitively expensive. TTC research determined that taking the electrical propulsion equipment (such as traction motors) from existing trolley buses, overhauling it, and installing it into new bus bodies could be a viable and more affordable solution. In 1967, the commission sent two accident-damaged Brill trolley buses to two manufacturers, Western Flyer in Canada and another in England, to evaluate the cost of such a conversion, but the British company ultimately decided it was unable to undertake the work. Western Flyer took the equipment from the TTC's trolley bus No. 9020 and installed it in a new body of its "700" line, calling it model E700 as the first electric example (diesel buses were model D700). The mostly new trolley bus was received by the TTC in July 1968.

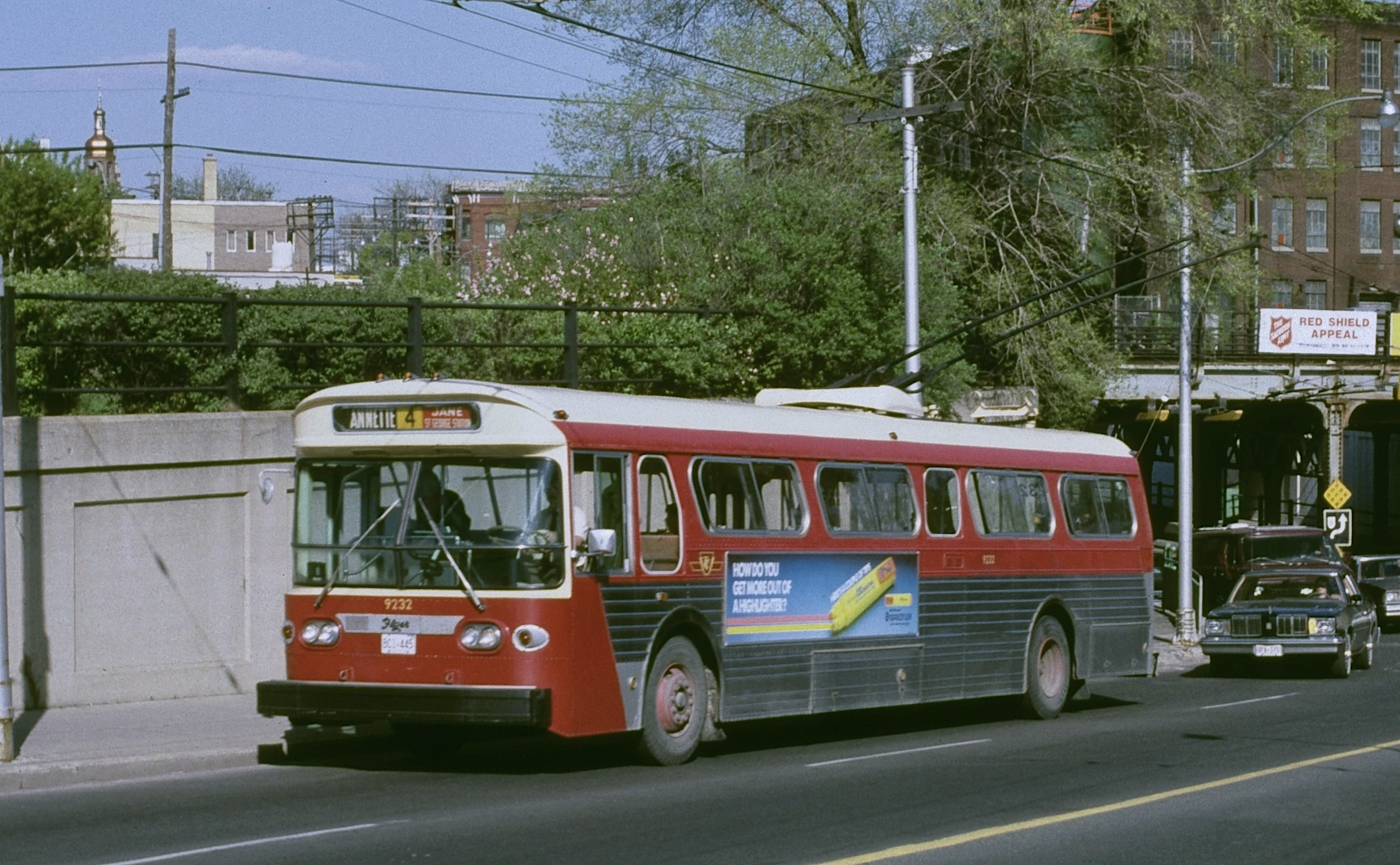
One of the Flyer E700A trolley buses that entered service in 1971–1972, here on route 4 Annette

The prototype was tested for more than a year, running in service on four routes. Judging the trial to be a success, the TTC contracted with Western Flyer in November 1969 to produce an additional 151 shells – bodies and chassis, complete with wheels, brakes, and suspension – and the TTC would equip them as trolley buses in its own Hillcrest Shops by transferring equipment from its CCF–Brill trolley buses. Although they would really be new vehicles with used electrical equipment, the Flyers were often referred to as "rebuilds" of Brill trolley buses, given their recycled propulsion system and that they were not built as complete trolley buses by Flyer. The motors and control equipment were also rebuilt before installation in the new bodyshell.

The prototype No. 9020 was sent back to Flyer in April 1970 for modifications (including a windshield redesign); it returned in August 1970, redesignated model E700A. Initially still numbered 9020, it was soon renumbered 9200, as the TTC had decided to number the "rebuilt" Brill vehicles into a new number series. Western Flyer then proceeded to build and ship the production-series E700A trolley bus shells from its plant in Winnipeg to the TTC's Hillcrest Shops, and the programme then ran for two years. The first production-series E700A trolley bus entered service on January 20, 1971, on route 89, and by mid-1971 74 had entered service. The last CCF–Brill trolley bus was taken out of service in March 1972 and the last Marmon-Herrington in June 1972. None of the Marmon-Herrington vehicles were used in the fleet-modernization programme, because their electrical equipment was made by Westinghouse, and the TTC chose to standardize its fleet on GE equipment, which all of its Brills had. To replace the Marmons in the rebuild programme, the TTC purchased 23 used GE-equipped Brill trolley buses from the transit systems in Halifax, Nova Scotia, and Cornwall.

The last of the 152 Flyer E700A trolley buses was completed by Flyer in April 1972 and by the TTC in August 1972, (another source says the last unit entered service in August 1972), and the full series was numbered 9200–9351. (Western Flyer had changed its name to Flyer Industries Limited in June 1971.) Flyer leased back No. 9213 for a time, to send it out for demonstration on several other trolley bus systems that were looking to renew their fleets. The large TTC programme had the effect of reviving the dormant North American trolley-bus manufacturing industry, albeit with only company, Flyer Industries. The Canadian trolley bus systems in Edmonton, Hamilton, and Vancouver, and the U.S. systems in Boston, Dayton and San Francisco in the mid- and late 1970s all purchased new trolley buses from Flyer. Some of those ordered by other Canadian systems followed Toronto's example of recycling electrical equipment from old trolley buses in otherwise-new vehicles, while others were fully new.

=== 1970s expansion ===
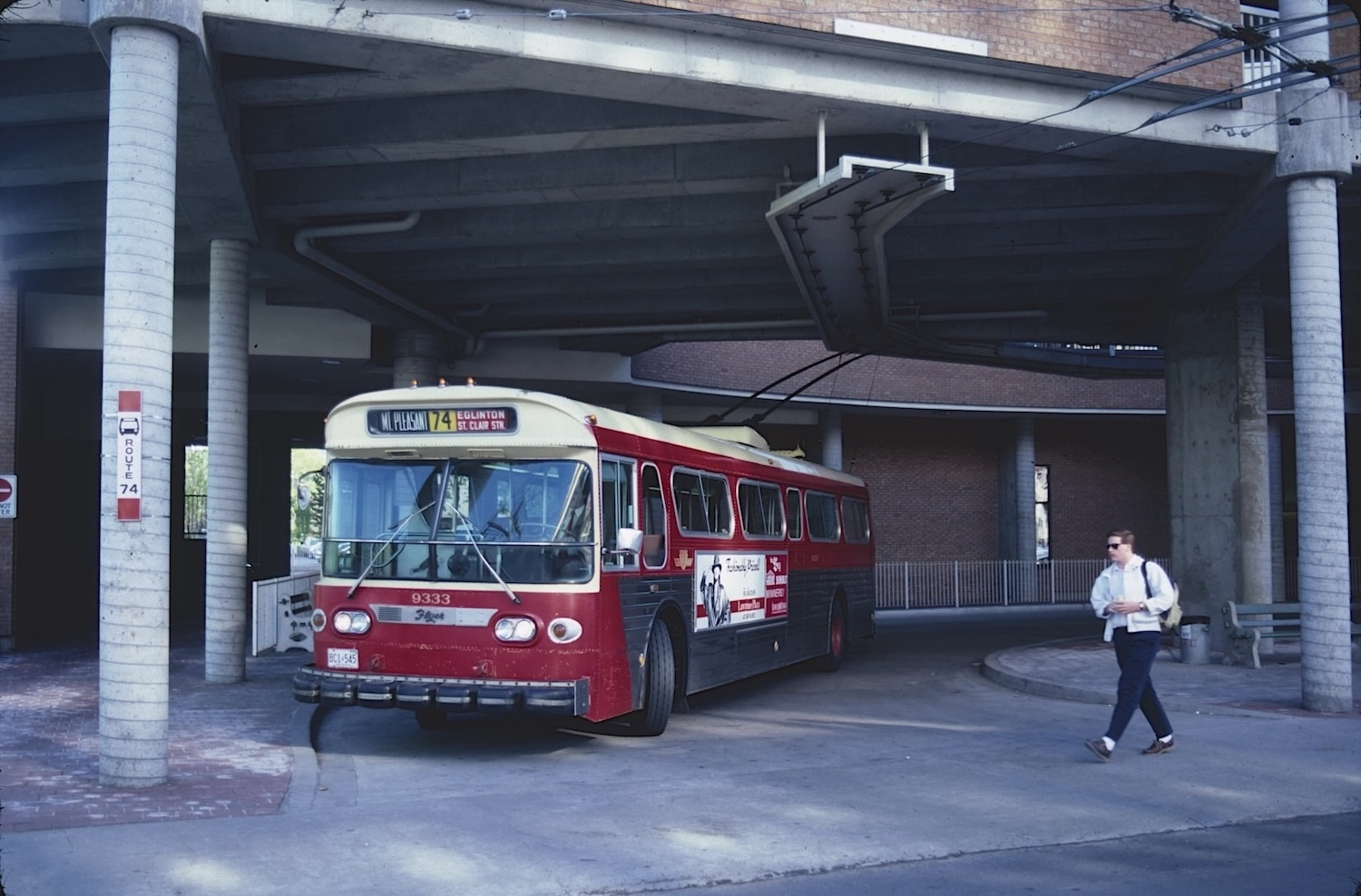
The last new route to open was 74 Mt. Pleasant, in 1977. Its northern terminus loop was under a building.

Although the 1970s brought several extensions to the trolley bus system, the first part of the decade also brought the first closure of a Toronto trolley bus route since the 1920s. With the extension of the Yonge subway line north to York Mills, route 97 Yonge became a lower-ridership route and was closed as trolley bus on March 31, 1973, replaced by motor bus route 97. However, the TTC ran a few trolley buses in service on the route on April 2 and 3, on rush-hour supplementary runs, as an experiment to see whether there was sufficient residual demand for such service following the subway's extension. The experiment was deemed unsatisfactory, and April 3, 1973, was the final day of any trolley bus operation on bus route 97. A two-block extension of route 89 to Albion Road opened on April 22, 1973, after highway widening forced the closure of Blondin Loop, its former terminus.

On July 22, 1974, the TTC opened a new branch of route 63 along Rogers Road to Bicknell Avenue, shown as 63F on destination signs, replacing the Rogers Road streetcar line. Trips on route 63 would alternate between serving the Rogers Road branch and the existing routing to Eglinton Avenue. New route 6 Bay opened on September 5, 1976. Route 74 Mount Pleasant began operation on November 20, 1977, replacing a streetcar line. This route revived trolley bus service on a section of Mount Pleasant Road where the TTC's experimental first trolley bus route had run more than half a century earlier. On January 28, 1978, with the opening of the Spadina subway (a northward extension of Line 1 Yonge–University's western branch), route 63 Ossington was extended a short distance east from Oakwood Street to terminate at Eglinton West station (now Cedarvale station).

=== 1980s and vacillation over the future ===
The trolley bus fleet began to be repainted in a new livery (colour scheme) in 1981, derived from the livery given to the new Canadian Light Rail Vehicles then being added to Toronto's fleet. It was bright red with black and white trim, instead of the deeper red and cream previously used. Around one third to one half of the fleet had been repainted by 1986, when repainting in the new colours ceased.

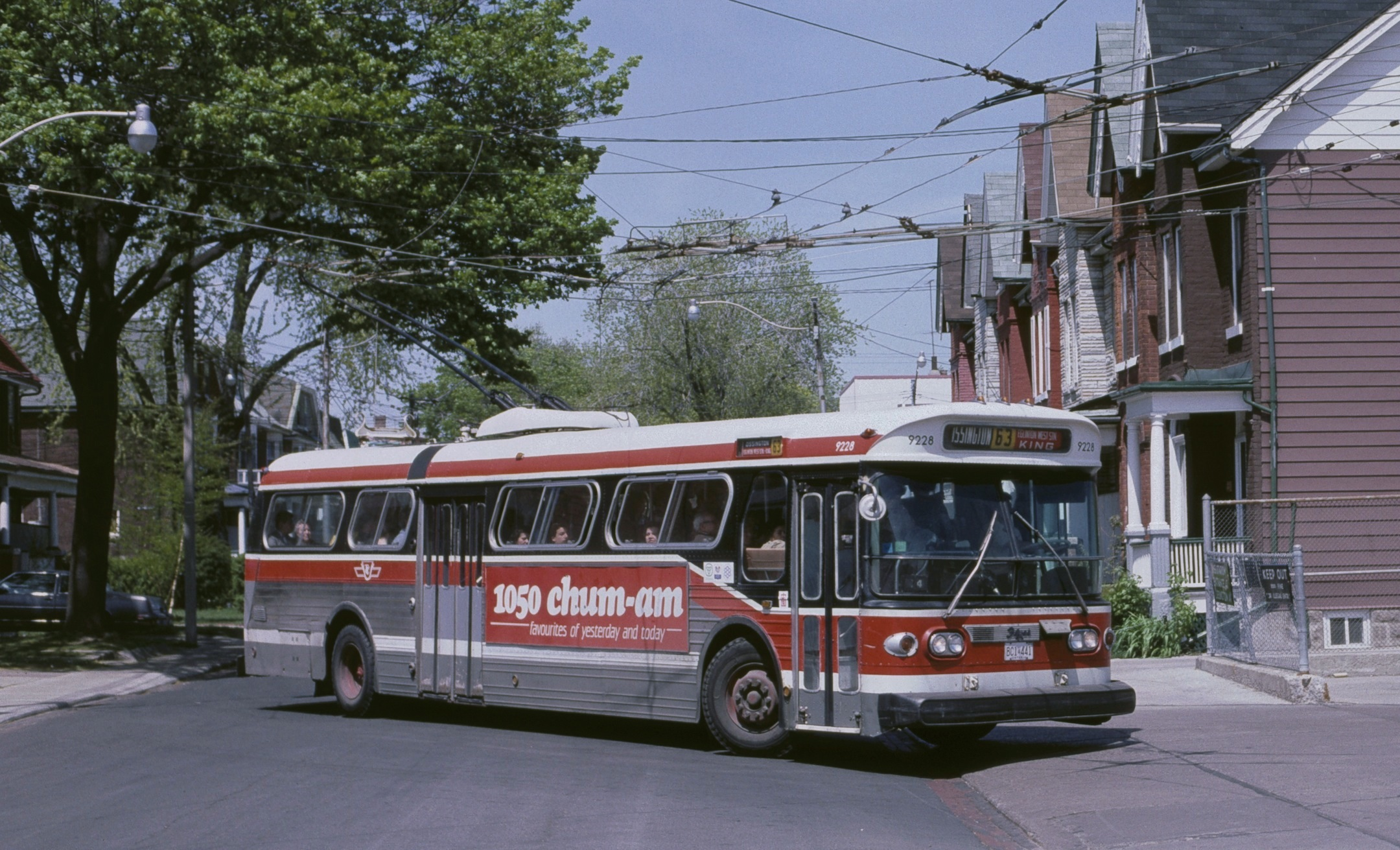
A trolley bus on route 63 that was repainted in the new livery first used on trolley buses in 1981

The conversion of up to 10 motor bus routes to trolley bus was proposed in a 1981 planning report, over a period of five years, with the TTC giving initial approval to the idea in March 1981. The first route chosen for conversion was 94 Wellesley, with opening targeted for 1985. However, after receipt of a different study report, the commission changed course, voting in April 1983 to endorse that report's recommendation to phase out trolley bus operation as the fleet reached the end of its useful life, then estimated for around the end of the decade. The newer study concluded that the benefits of continuing trolley bus operation, in terms of better ride quality and environmental impact, were outweighed by the additional expenses as compared with diesel bus operation. After additional study and discussion, the commission voted in June 1986 to retain the full trolley bus system after all and to extend it by converting four diesel bus routes to trolley buses.

By this time, the existing fleet was around 15 years old, but fitted with electrical equipment dating to the late 1940s and early 1950s, and the route expansion plans would also require an expansion of the trolley bus fleet. In 1987, the TTC issued a request for proposals for 112 new trolley buses, with options for 60 more, but the planned procurement experienced multiple delays, and it was reported that the TTC management favoured closing the trolley bus system, in contrast with the publicly appointed commissioners, who had voted for its retention and expansion. This position of management was reflected in a report presented to the commission on December 1, 1987, with the commission again rejecting management's recommendation. Support for the trolley bus system among the public was strong. However, the commission agreed to allow additional study, in particular the idea of purchasing new compressed natural gas (CNG) buses to replace trolley buses.

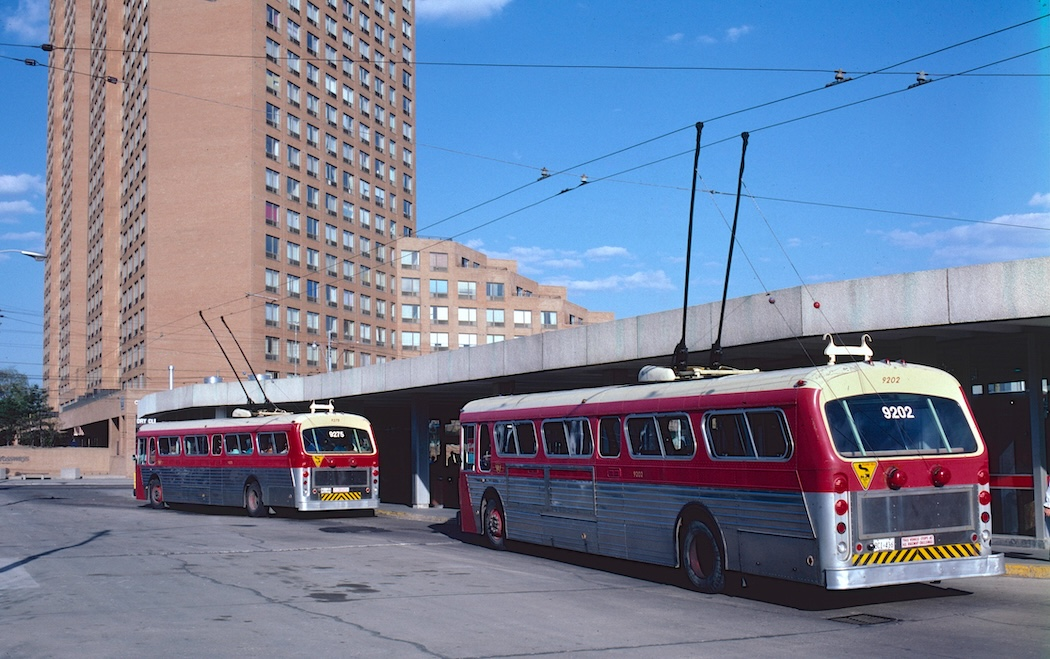
Two Flyer trolley buses in the surface loop for Dundas West subway station, on route 40 Junction

Meanwhile, the nine routes continued operating. TTC documents from 1987 indicated that the total number of trolley buses scheduled in service was 107 in the morning peak period, 50 in the weekday daytime, and 100 in the evening peak period. The daytime figures for Saturday and Sunday were 49 and 36, respectively. The route with the shortest daytime off-peak headway was 6 Bay, at 5 minutes, while most other routes had headways between 9 and 11 minutes between the peak periods, but 15 minutes for the isolated three routes based at the Eglinton Garage (61, 74, 103). The most heavily used route, 6 Bay, alone accounted for 30 of the 107 scheduled morning-peak vehicles, and its scheduled headway during that period was just 1 minute, 40 seconds. The system's total route mileage in 1987 (thus omitting 1973-closed route 97) was 33.7 mi (54.2 km), with the longest route being 89 Weston Road, at 6.25 mi (10.06 km).

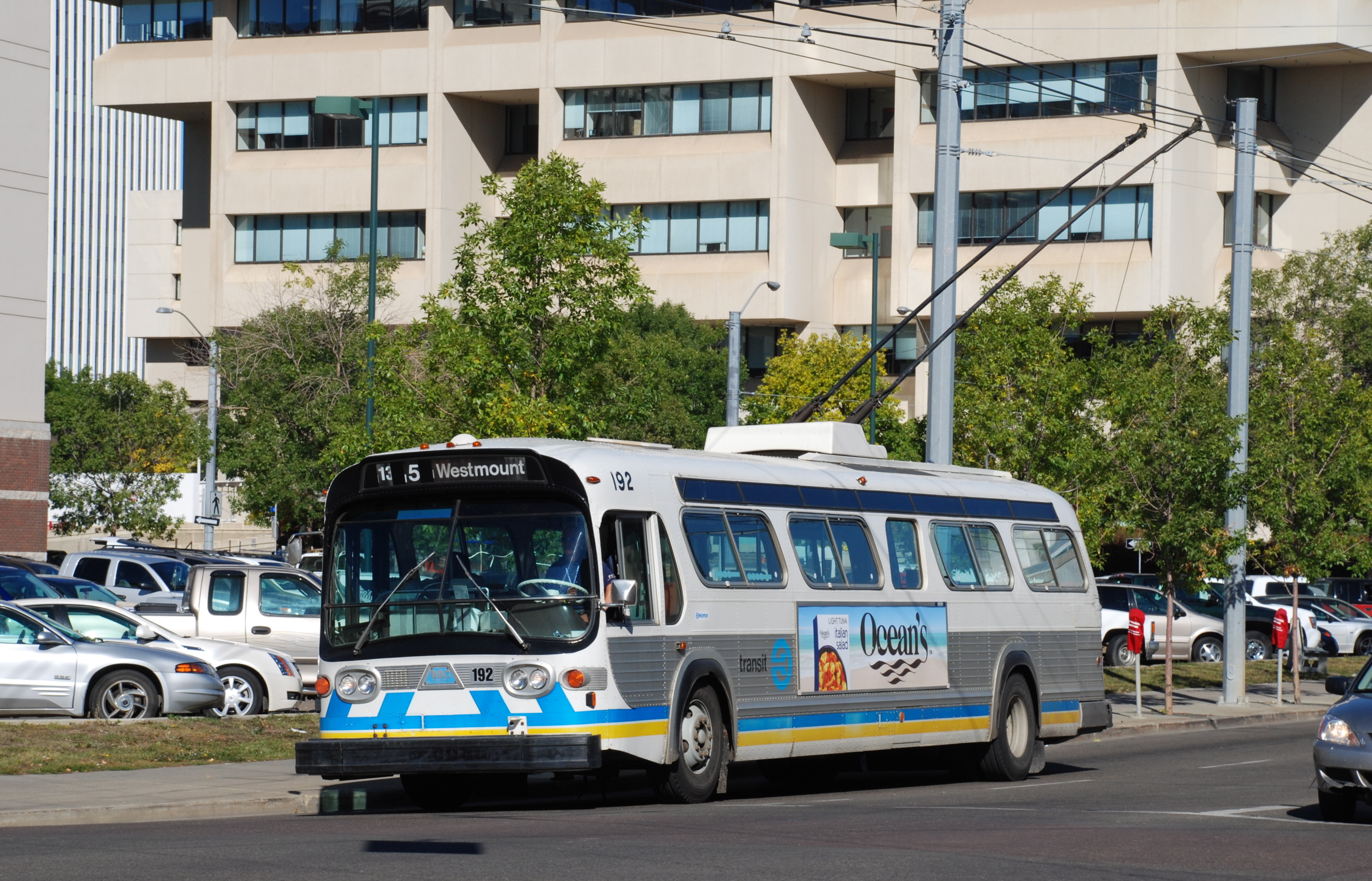
One of the first two trolley buses leased from the Edmonton trolley bus system in 1989 pictured several years later, after returning from Toronto

The plans to purchase new trolley buses were deferred indefinitely, but the TTC still wished to begin replacing its aging trolley buses. The transit agency turned to the Edmonton Transit System, which had a large surplus of relatively young trolley buses (built between 1981 and 1982), after its plans to expand its own network had been scaled back. Two of Edmonton's General Motors-bodied Brown, Boveri & Co. (BBC) trolley buses were brought to Toronto under lease in December 1989, for testing, entering service on January 10, 1990. In April 1990, the TTC commission approved plans for a three-year lease of 30 Edmonton trolley buses, including extending the lease of the two already in Toronto, and the 28 additional vehicles arrived in June 1990. The lease was expanded by 10 vehicles the following year, in May 1991, bringing the total to 40.

=== Final years ===
In December 1991, the fate of the trolley bus system took a sudden turn for the worse. The early 1990s recession had hit Toronto hard and by late 1991 had precipitated a serious financial crisis for the Ontario government, which told the TTC to cut its 1992 operating budget by $30 million. TTC ridership was way down, reducing fare revenue, while much of the fleet was aging and in need of replacement. In the case of the trolley bus system, the infrastructure was also in need of refurbishment, and the fact that the price of oil was very low at the time made trolley buses the most expensive type of vehicle to operate in the TTC's fleet, according to TTC staff. A package of budget cuts drawn up by TTC included closure of the entire trolley bus system, estimated to save $2 million, and was approved by the commission on December 17, 1991. Over the next month, the transit agency proceeded to convert all nine trolley bus routes to diesel buses. The Toronto City Council twice passed resolutions opposing the closure, but the TTC did not change course, saying the council had no jurisdiction over it.

The last route to operate with trolley buses at this time was 6 Bay, on the night of January 18/19, 1992. However, the TTC continued to face strong public opposition to the elimination of trolley bus service, and was criticized for what some saw as a short-sighted and rushed decision. Debate over a possible reversal continued, and on June 2, 1992, the commission voted 4-to-3 to restore trolley bus service as soon as practical on route 6 and possibly 4 and to prepare plans for a purchase of up to 160 new trolley buses and potential network expansion. Only the Edmonton BBC vehicles, the lease of which would not expire until July 1993, would return to service. Trolley bus service resumed on routes 4 and 6 in September 1992. (None of the Flyer trolley buses ever returned to service, and January 18 was the last day that any of those vehicles operated in service.) The TTC considered renewing the lease of the Edmonton vehicles, but with much disagreement among different factions, and with the commissioners divided over the issue, a decision was repeatedly delayed in spring and summer 1993. On July 8, the commission finally settled the matter, with another 4-to-3 vote, this one against renewing the lease. The two surviving trolley bus routes closed days later, route 4 on July 11 (in the early hours of the 12th) and route 6 on July 16, 1993, the last trolley bus returning to the garage at 1:29 a.m. on the 17th. All but one of the Edmonton vehicles were returned to Edmonton in December 1993, and all but one of the Flyer trolley buses had been removed for scrapping by spring 1995.

=== Fleet ===
Fleet numbers	Qty.	Year built	Manufacturer	Model	Last used	Notes
9000–9084	85	1947–1948	Canadian Car & Foundry (CCF) – Brill	T-44	1970–1971	
9085–9124	40	1953	CCF–Brill	T-48A	1970–1971	
9125–9139	15	1948	Marmon-Herrington	TC48	1970–1971	Ex–Cincinnati, Ohio; acquired in 1953.
9140–9144	5	1951	CCF–Brill	T-48A	1971	Ex–Ottawa, Ontario; acquired in 1959.
9145–9152	8	1947–1948	Marmon-Herrington	TC44	1970–1971	Ex–Cleveland, Ohio; acquired in 1963.
9020 (2nd) / 9200	1	1968	Western Flyer Coach	E700		Prototype new trolley bus equipped with electrical equipment recycled from Brill trolley bus number 9020. Originally kept that fleet number, but was renumbered 9200 in 1970.
9201–9351	151	1970–1972	Western Flyer Coach/Flyer Industries (Note: Western Flyer Coach was renamed Flyer Industries Limited in June 1971, so the manufacturer's name for those units built after that date was Flyer Industries, but all 151 were built by the same company.)/TTC	E700A	Jan 1992	Equipped with electrical equipment recycled from Brill trolley buses.
9149–57, 9159, 9163–72, 9174, 9176–78, 9180–92, 9196–97, 9199	40	1982	Brown Boveri & Co. / General Motors (Note: BBC was the primary contractor for these vehicles, and General Motors (which provided the bodies and chassis) was a subcontractor.) (with "New Look" body)	HR150G–T6H5307N	Jul 16, 1993	Leased from the Edmonton Transit System (operator of the Edmonton trolley bus system) starting in 1989 (two units, 9192 and 9197), 1990 (28 more), and 1991 (10 more), and lasting until 1993. Their TTC fleet numbers were the same as their Edmonton ones but with "9" added in front, and they kept their ETS livery in Toronto. The 10 lowest-numbered ones were the last to arrive (in 1991).

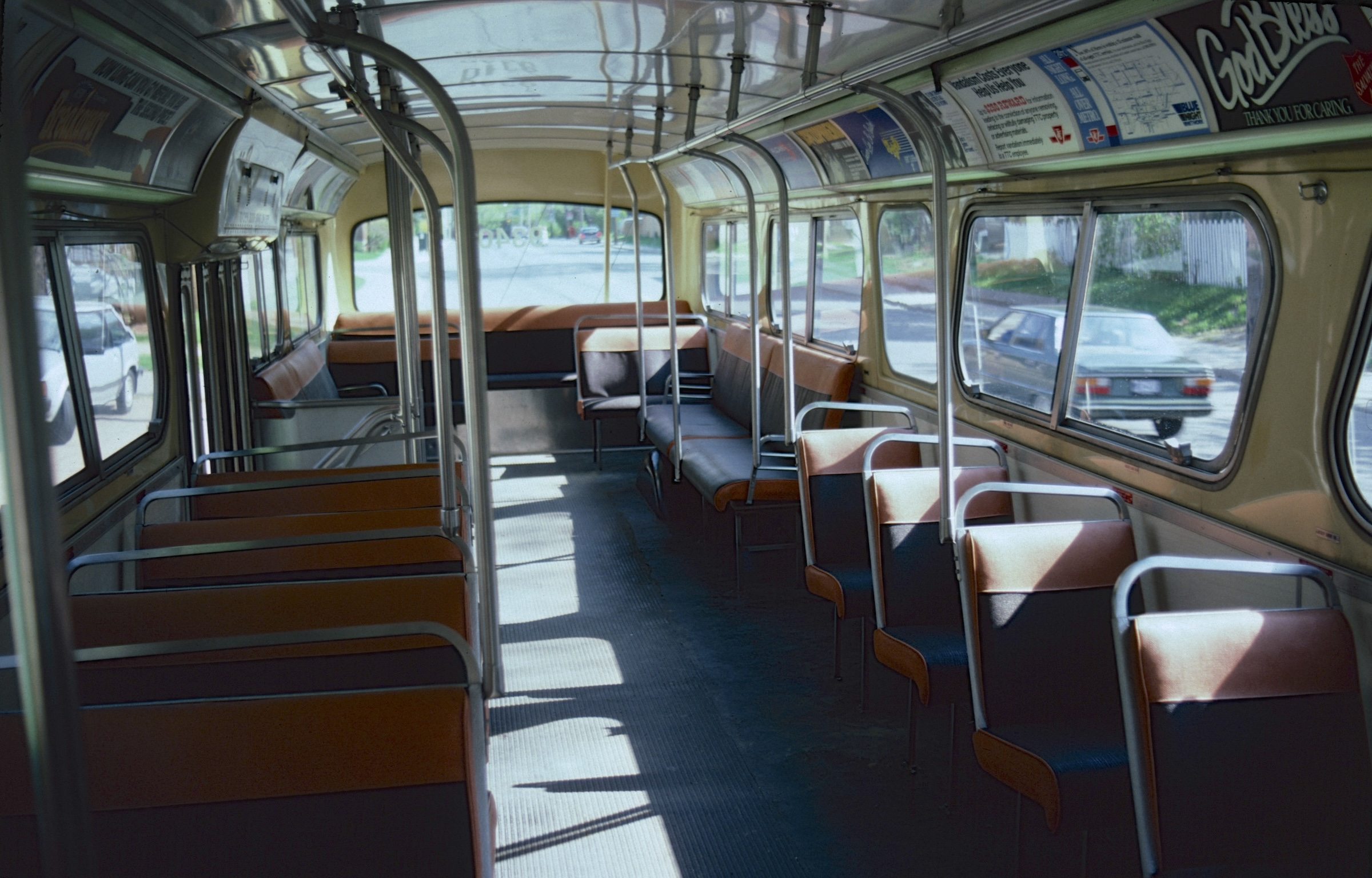
Interior of a Flyer E700A trolley bus

==== Preserved vehicles ====
Two Toronto trolley buses are known to have been preserved—one from the first system and one from the second. No. 23, a 1922 Packard, was discovered on a farm in 1974 and acquired by the Halton County Radial Railway museum, which has restored its body. However, it lacks motors, controller, and seats. No. 9339, a 1972 Flyer E700A, was preserved by the Halton County Radial Railway museum in 2000, but in 2006 it joined the collection of the Illinois Railway Museum, in the United States. It is the only known survivor of Toronto's Flyer trolley buses. No. 9240 was also not among the vehicles sold for scrap in 1995, and was moved in 1995 to the Ashtonbee campus of Centennial College, in Scarborough, Ontario, for "at least partial restoration". However, that work did not proceed as planned, and by 2006 No. 9240 had been scrapped.

== See also ==
- List of trolley bus systems in Canada
- Toronto Transit Commission bus system
