= St. Clair Carhouse =

Streetcar depot facility in Toronto, Ontario

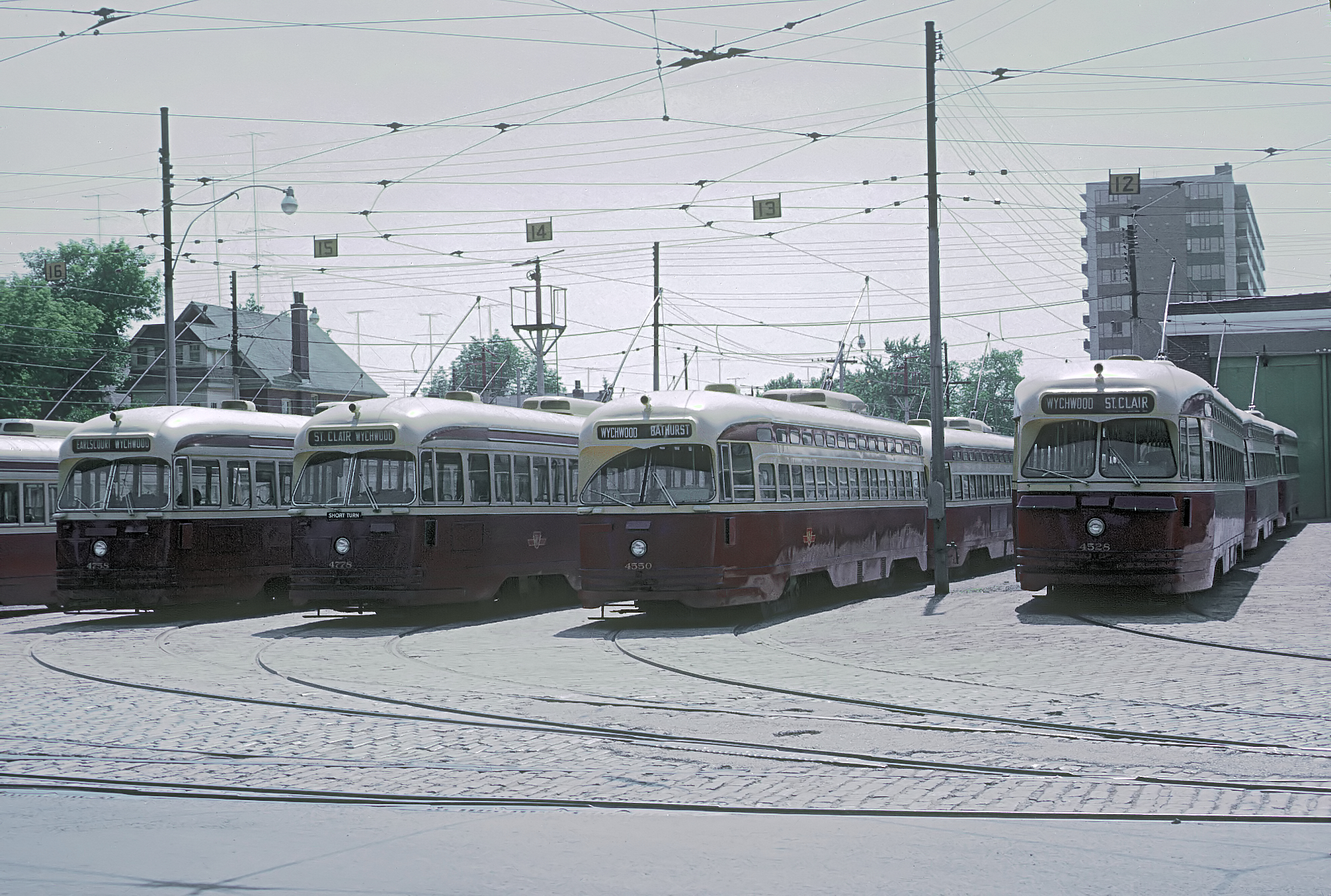
- Streetcars signed for Earlscourt, Bathurst and St. Clair routes at St. Clair Carhouse in 1966

General information
- Location: Wychwood Avenue at Benson Avenue; Toronto, Ontario; Canada
- Coordinates: 43.679920°N 79.423165°W
- Operator: Toronto Transit Commission

Construction
- Structure type: Maintenance and storage facility

History
- Opened: 1913
- Closed: 1978 (as a division); 1998 (as a TTC facility)
Location

The St. Clair Carhouse (also known informally as the Wychwood Carhouse) was a streetcar facility in Toronto, Ontario, Canada. It was located south of St. Clair Avenue on a parcel of land bounded by Wychwood Avenue on the east, Benson Avenue on its north side and Christie Street on the west side. It was opened by the Toronto Civic Railways in 1913, taken over by the Toronto Transportation Commission in 1921 and closed by its successor, the Toronto Transit Commission, in 1998. The carhouse was subsequently transformed into a community centre called the Wychwood Barns.

== TCR carhouse (1913–1921) ==
In 1911, the City of Toronto created the Toronto Civic Railways (TCR) to serve newly annexed neighbourhoods that the privately owned Toronto Railway Company refused to serve. The TCR opened the St. Clair streetcar line along St. Clair Avenue from Yonge Street to Station Street (today Caledonia Road) on August 25, 1913. The new line temporarily operated out of the Station Street supply yard as the St. Clair Carhouse would not be available for four more months. The TCR used only double-ended streetcars.

On December 31, 1913, the St. Clair Carhouse opened, but it would not be fully completed until April 14, 1914. At that time, the carhouse building had three tracks with a capacity of three streetcars each. Each track had a service pit, and the carhouse had rail grinding equipment. There was storage outside for three more streetcars plus a snow sweeper. A traffic office and storeroom were located on the west side of the building. The carhouse had doors for streetcars only on the east side of the building, for access from Bracondale Avenue (today Wychwood Avenue). There was a single track running north along Bracondale Avenue from the carhouse to St. Clair Avenue.

In 1916, the TCR built a 3-stall addition on the south side of the existing building for nine additional streetcars. It went into use in February 1917 to handle the extra streetcars needed for the new Lansdowne streetcar line and increased traffic on the St. Clair streetcar line. The exterior capacity was increased to nine streetcars. Thus, the facility now had capacity for 27 streetcars plus the snow sweeper.

== TTC carhouse (1921–1978) ==
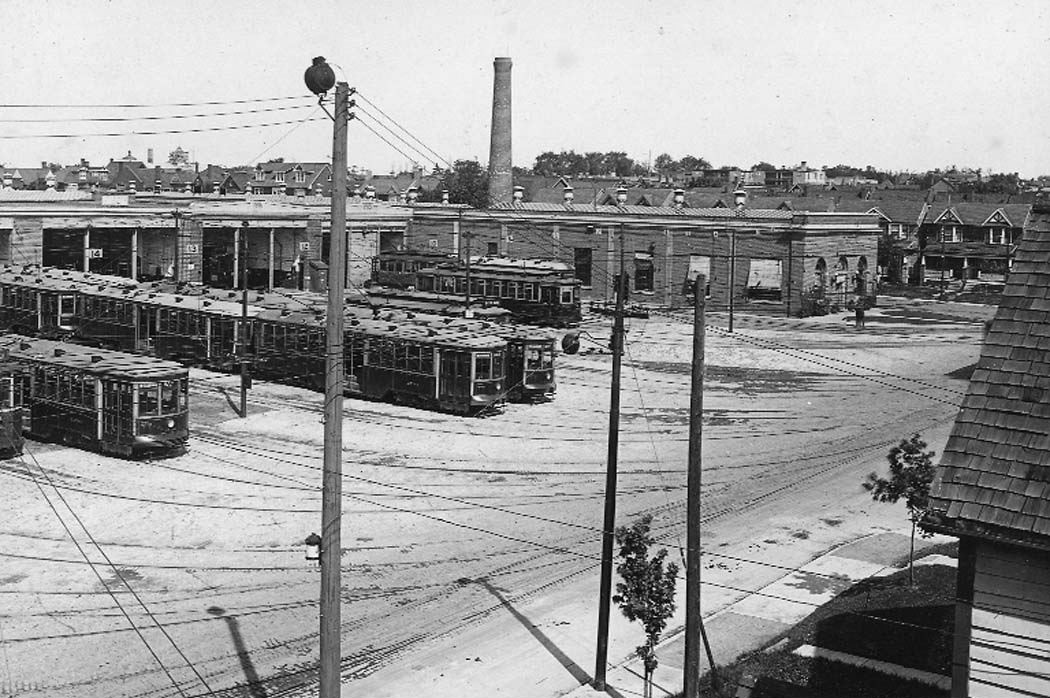
St. Clair Carhouse in 1924

External image
- St. Clair Division track plan (1960)

In 1921, the Toronto Transportation Commission inherited the assets of the Toronto Civic Railways, including the St. Clair Carhouse. The TTC expanded the carhouse by adding two more 3-bay extensions on the south side of the 1916 barn and a 2-bay repair shop on the north side of the 1913 barn. Barn doors were added on the west side for streetcars to enter via a westbound track beside Benson Avenue. Nine tracks were added to the yard on the south side of the carhouse building. With the extra tracks, the carhouse could hold 50 streetcars plus 110 in the exterior yard, for a total facility capacity of 160 streetcars. A new traffic office was added at the northeast corner of the facility. The connecting track to St. Clair Avenue was double-tracked. In 1922, the TTC added fire and car washing equipment to its St. Clair Carhouse along with Danforth Carhouse, Russell Carhouse and Lansdowne Carhouse.

Between December 1921 and January 1922, Bathurst streetcars were transferred here from the Lansdowne Carhouse, and Avenue Road and Dupont streetcars from the Yorkville Carhouse. Between December 14 and 25, 1921, Peter Witt streetcars were temporarily operated out of St. Clair Carhouse to serve the Yonge streetcar line while alterations were made to the Yorkville Carhouse to handle wider streetcars. By 1932, eight routes were operating from St. Clair Carhouse: Bay, Bathurst, Bathurst Tripper (overlapping Bathurst during rush hours), Dupont, Fort, St. Clair, Rogers and Oakwood.

PCC streetcars first went into service on the St. Clair route on September 8, 1938, and on September 24, the St. Clair route became the first in Toronto to fully convert to PCC streetcars. The previous evening (September 23), a ceremony was held at the corner of Wychwood and St. Clair Avenues to honour the occasion. The PCCs replaced Class BB streetcars that the TTC had inherited from the Toronto Railway Company. Starting November 1940, PCC streetcars from St. Clair Carhouse provided night service on the Yonge streetcar line. PCC streetcars were also introduced into service on Bathurst and Dupont in 1942, on Fort in 1948, on Bay in 1950, and on Oakwood and Rogers in 1952, with all these routes being based at the St. Clair Carhouse.

After the opening of the Yonge subway (today part of Line 1 Yonge–University) on March 30, 1954, the Bay route was discontinued, but the carhouse was still busy servicing Bathurst, Dupont (extended to cover the full length of Bay Street), Earlscourt (overlapping the St. Clair route), Fort (overlapping the Bathurst route), St. Clair, Rogers and Oakwood streetcar routes. More streetcars were required for a rush-hour extension of the Rogers route to St. Clair station, which overlapped the St. Clair route.

In 1957, the TTC purchased 30 second-hand PCCs from the Kansas City Public Service Company and placed them in service on the St. Clair streetcar route in 1958. These had one-piece sign curtains showing only St. Clair and Earlscourt route destinations; thus, these PCCs were all assigned to the St. Clair Carhouse. A distinctive feature of these Class A14 PCCs was that they were the only postwar, all-electric PCCs built without standee windows. After going into service, they displaced 30 Class K Peter Witt streetcars which were scrapped.

In January 1960, the Oakwood streetcar line was discontinued and replaced by the Ossington trolley bus line. On February 28, 1963, opening day for the University extension of the Yonge subway, the Dupont streetcar route was replaced by buses on Bay Street. The abandonment of the Dupont route freed up enough PCC streetcars, that the TTC could retire the 40-year-old Peter Witt streetcars operating out of St. Clair Carhouse. Peter Witt cars (15 on the Bathurst route and 8 on Fort) made their last large-scale runs February 28. Because of a shortage of PCC streetcars at St. Clair Carhouse, a couple of Witts ran on the Bathurst route on March 6 and 7. Operating on the Bathurst route, six Witts each made one last run on April 24 to service crowds exiting a baseball game at Exhibition Place; however, it is unclear from which carhouse these six originated.

On February 26, 1966, opening day of the Bloor–Danforth subway (today Line 2 Bloor–Danforth), the Fort route was discontinued, and streetcars no longer served Bathurst Street north of Bloor Street. There was still a Bathurst route operating south of Bathurst station.

Circa 1975, the yard was used to store surplus trolley buses of the TTC's trolley bus system. Some overhead trolley bus wire was installed to keep the buses' on-board batteries charged. The trolley buses were made surplus by the conversion of the 97 Yonge route to diesel buses and would later be reassigned to a new 6 Bay trolley bus route.

The Rogers route closed in 1974; Mt. Pleasant (created in 1975 from the eastern portion of the St. Clair line) was replaced by bus service in 1976; Earlscourt was folded into St. Clair in 1978. This left only the St. Clair and Bathurst streetcar routes operating out of St. Clair Carhouse. The TTC felt it was not economical to keep the carhouse operating as a division for only two routes; thus, on April 15, 1978, St. Clair ceased to be a division, and all streetcars and staff were transferred to Russell Carhouse.

== TTC storage facility (1978–1998) ==
On April 15, 1978, six of the nine exterior yard tracks were severed just before they crossed into Wychwood Avenue.

The facility was leased to the Urban Transportation Development Corporation to test and modify the 196 CLRVs it was building for the TTC. In August 1982, the facility also received UTDC's prototype of the ALRV (TTC number 4900).

In the late 1980s, the yard became a streetcar graveyard for retired, and often partly stripped, PCCs awaiting disposal. Retired trolley buses were also placed in the yard.

In early 1985, the carhouse was used to store and retrofit ICTS cars for the Scarborough RT (later Line 3 Scarborough). This was done to temporarily free up space at the RT's carhouse at the McCowan Yard.

By the end of 1991, all carhouse tracks and all but one yard track had been severed at the east end of the property. Tracks in the yard had deteriorated, and the carhouse building had structural problems. To avoid the costs of repairs and maintenance, the TTC sold the property to the city for $1. The TTC closed the facility on May 29, 1998, and the switches at the corner of St. Clair Avenue at Wychwood Avenue were plugged and subsequently removed.

== Postscript ==
The "barns" still exist today. As a result of lobbying by the Toronto Historical Society, the site was leased to Toronto Artscape, which renovated the building and reopened it as a community centre called the Wychwood Barns. The exterior streetcar yard was converted into a public park. As of September 2020, there were still detached remnants of the connecting tracks on Wychwood Avenue.

In 2020, the TTC proposed setting up a carhouse at the Hillcrest Complex, with a capacity for 25 streetcars, to serve the nearby 512 St. Clair streetcar route and to provide more streetcar storage space for a growing fleet of streetcars. A carhouse at the Hillcrest Complex would also eliminate about 10 kilometres (6 mi) of non-revenue travel to get to the 512 route from other carhouses.
