= Wychwood Barns =

Community centre and park in Toronto, Canada

Artscape Wychwood Barns
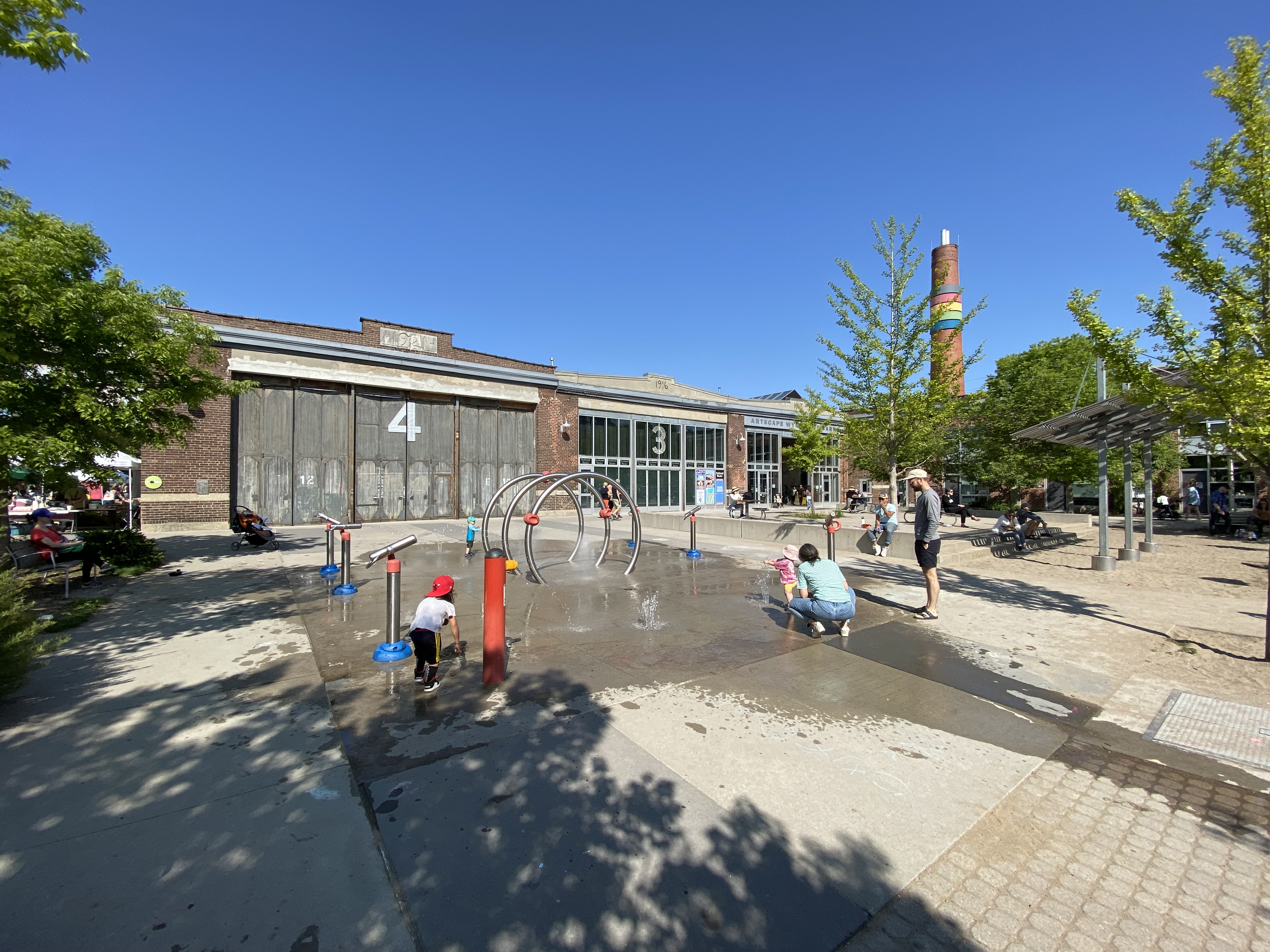
- Interactive map of Artscape Wychwood Barns
- Type: Community centre / Urban park
- Location: 601 Christie Street; Toronto, Ontario, Canada; M6G 2X7
- Coordinates: 43°40′48″N 79°25′25″W
- Created: November 20, 2008
- Owner: City of Toronto
- Manager: ArtHubs Toronto (2023-Present) Artscape (2006-2023)
- Open: 09:00 – 17:00 daily
- Status: Open all year
- Website: wychwoodbarns.ca

Ontario Heritage Act
- Official name: Wychwood Car Barns
- Designated: 2007

Artscape Wychwood Barns is a community centre and park in the Bracondale Hill area of Toronto. The converted heritage building was built as a streetcar maintenance facility in 1913. It now contains artist housing and studios, public green space, a greenhouse, a farmer's market, a beach volleyball court, a theatre, a dog run, and office space for many local community groups. The site is a total of 5,574 square metres (60,000 square feet).

== Description ==
Wychwood Barns is a former industrial complex of five buildings on 4.3 acres (1.7 ha) that has been converted into a community centre in an example of adaptive reuse. The original barns were built from 1913 to 1921. They are brick structures, two storeys high, with exposed steel structural elements on the interior.

Architect Joe Lobko and city councillor Joe Mihevc worked to transform the early 20th-century facility into a multipurpose space. Lobko, with the help of the community, was able to identify the activities missing in the area. He came up with a program of activities that can educate the community, promote partnerships with nonprofit organizations and allow Toronto's culture to grow. Lobko retained most elements of the buildings' exteriors, adding floor-to-ceiling glass to the east and west walls of Barn 2. He programmed Barn 1 as private live-work studio and housing for community artists, while Barn 2 was made into a community gathering space. The space became a covered street that is two storeys high, 60 metres long, and 10 meters wide. Barns 3 and 4 are private-public spaces where non-profit organizations can operate. A greenhouse and community gardens are located in Barn 4. Finally, Barn 5 was stripped of its roof as well as south wall and remains exposed to the elements. All that remains is the steel structure that forms the arcade.

== History ==
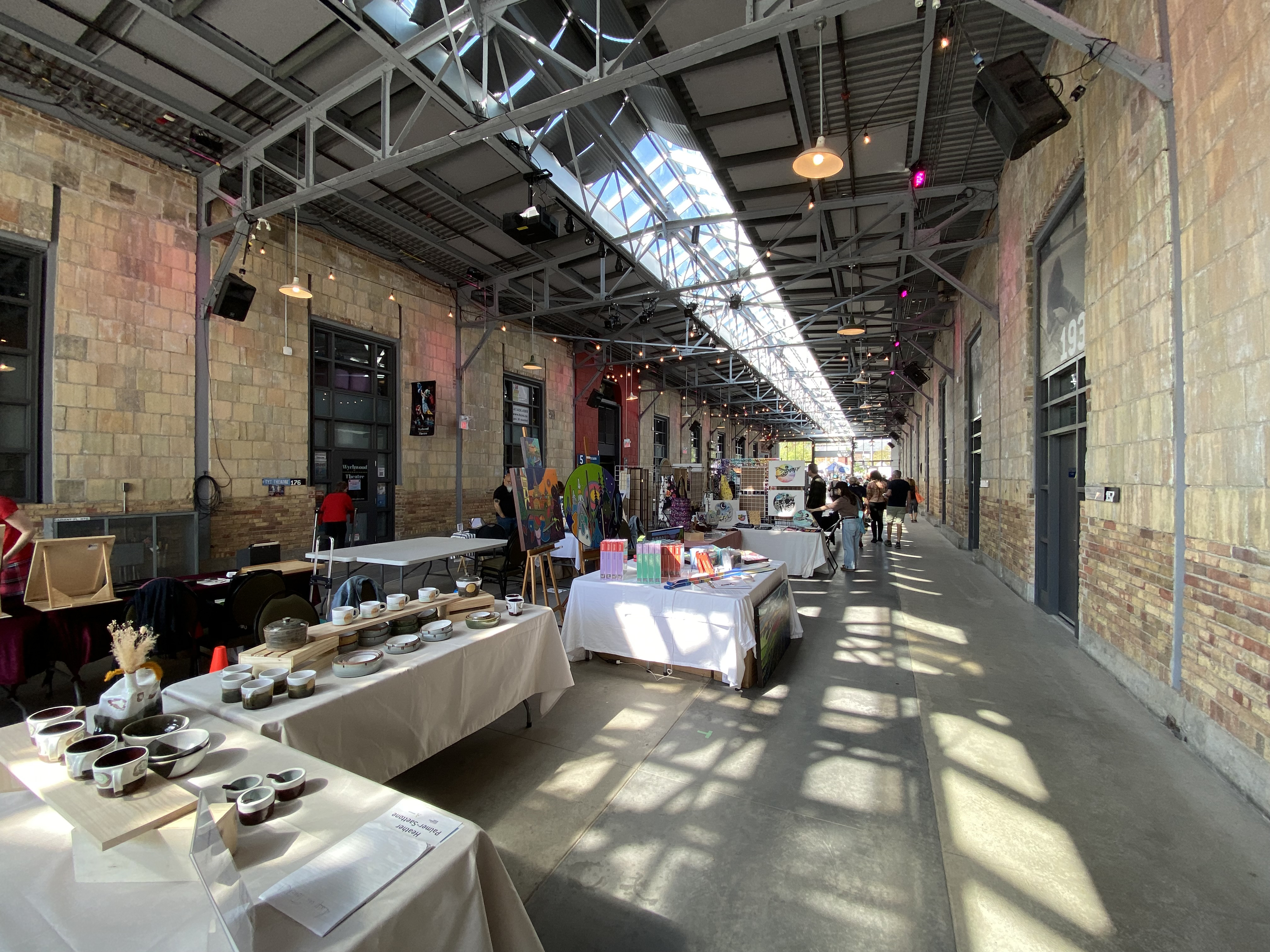
Wychwood Barns Interior

In 1911, the City of Toronto created the Toronto Civic Railways to serve newly annexed neighbourhoods that the privately owned Toronto Railway Company refused to serve. The St. Clair Carhouse (informally known as the Wychwood Carhouse or Wychwood Barns), was constructed to serve the TCR's St. Clair streetcar line. The first three-bay barn was built in 1913, and a second was added in 1916. In 1921, the Toronto Transportation Commission (today's Toronto Transit Commission) inherited the TCR and added three more barns, two with three bays plus a repair shop with two bays. Streetcars accessed the site from the main lines on St. Clair Avenue, just north of the barns, using tracks running south on Wychwood Avenue. A series of switches led to spur loops into the carhouse and to storage tracks on the south side of the property. The facility closed as an active carhouse in 1978, but continued to be used for storage until the 1990s.

The property was transferred to city ownership in 1996 for a nominal $1 fee. In 2006, the city leased the site to Toronto Artscape Inc., who would transform the former TTC streetcar repair facility into an arts and community hub. Artscape, a not-for-profit organization that developed and operated space for the arts, was to pay the city $1 a year for 50 years. To redeveloped the site, Artscape raised a total of $19-million, including $2.3-million from the federal government of Canada, $3-million from Ontario's provincial government, and $4.5-million from the City of Toronto. Construction occurred between March 2007 and October 2008, with the official opening on November 20, 2008.

In 2020, as the COVID-19 pandemic shuttered event spaces and performance venues, Artscape's years of debt-financed expansion collided with a crash in revenue, and the organization's finances sharply deteriorated. In August 2023, Artscape announced that it would soon enter receivership, and hand off management of its various sites and facilities. Following Artscape's insolvency, the City of Toronto established ArtHubs, a new not-for-profit organization that would steward the four city-owned sites previously managed by Artscape, including the Wychwood Barns. The other three sites are Daniels Spectrum, Gibraltar Point, and Youngplace. In addition to ArtHubs, resident artists, and the non-profit organizations that call the barns home, programming is also organized by the Wychwood Barns Community Association.

A short section of tracks along Wychwood Avenue remains, between St Clair Ave West and Helena Avenue, but the tracks are no longer connected to the St Clair streetcar line nor into the former car barns.

== Culture and amenities ==
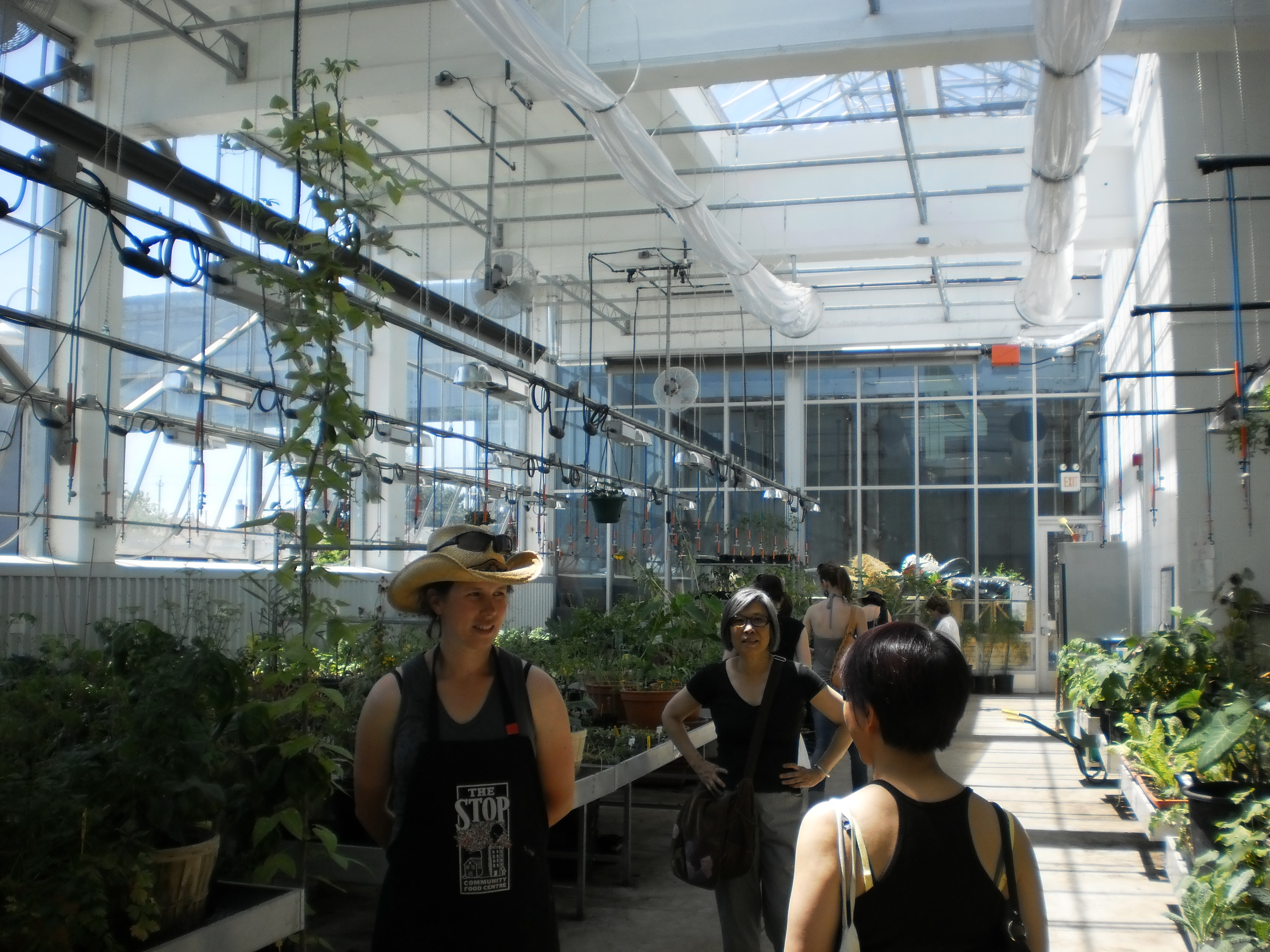
The Global Roots Garden<

Today, the Wychwood Barns functions as a community centre and multi-use park for the surrounding community and general public.

=== The Global Roots Garden ===
The Global Roots Garden begins at the start of spring to late fall in Barn #5. The public garden provides an ethnic oriented space for seniors and youth. Seniors and youth are provided with a garden to harvest vegetables and plants that are commonly grown in their ethnic culture while simultaneously educating one another. The Global Roots Garden enforces a sense of community. Ethnic gardens range from Tibetan, Italian, Filipino, Polish, Latino-American, South Asian, and Chinese while the youth are provided with their own garden space.

=== Brewery Market ===
The Brewery Market takes place on summer Sundays in Barn #4. The events are held in the Sheltered Garden of The Stop's Green Barn, which is partially covered and outdoors, making it a pleasant summertime spot for a beer. On each Brewery Market Sunday, one can sample beers from a different craft brewery, with a number of different beers available. Eleven breweries in total were featured in The Brewery Market's summer 2011 series. Partial proceeds from The Brewery Market help support The Stop's many healthy food initiatives, which include community kitchens and gardens programs, community advocacy, urban agriculture projects, sustainable food systems education and perinatal care programs.

=== Music in the Barns ===
Music in the Barns, Studio 164 at the Artscape Wychwood Barns, is a nexus for exploring and creating new avenues in the advancement of classical music. Music in the Barns functions as performer, presenter, and educator, by presenting events, concerts and educational opportunities. Its resident ensemble, The Music in the Barns Chamber Ensemble is made up of 8 leading musicians, gathering some of the most interesting and creative classical musicians in North America.

On Thursday August 4, 2011, the inaugural summer concert was performed, featuring works by J.S. Bach, W.A. Mozart, R.V. Williams and A. Piazzolla.

=== Adaptive Reuse ===
In 1996, abandoned and deserted, Wychwood Barns future was not promising. Plans for demolition and sale were scheduled until Toronto Councilor Joe Mihevc proposed a heritage study for Wychwood Barns. Formally declared a site of heritage for the city of Toronto, the abandoned street car building can no longer be used for its purpose it was built for. Due to by-laws against demolishing a heritage site, Wychwood Barns used the adaptive reuse approach to restoring the site. Other examples of adaptive reuse in Toronto can be found in the Distillery District and Brickworks.

Wychwood Barns has become an influential site of adaptive reuse in Toronto. The successful adaptive use of space can be seen in its multiple communal amenities created by the community and provided to the community and public. The quote by Jane Jacobs that states, "Cities have the capability of providing something for everybody, only because, and only when, they are created by everybody" is apparent in the infrastructure, amenities, and events held in Wychwood Barns.

=== Trivia Night ===
Wychwood Open Door holds its annual Trivia Night Fundraiser at the Wychwood Barns. The event was first held on March 7, 2009 and has occurred every year since. The event attracts more than 300 people and typically sells out. Event organizers have called it Toronto's largest live trivia game. Teams of 10 compete against each other in a live trivia game similar to Trivial Pursuit. The event is a fundraiser for a neighbourhood charity called the Wychwood Open Door, which is a drop-in centre, providing free meals and other services for community members. Many people living with poverty, social isolation regularly go to the Wychwood Open Door. Trivia Night is the Wychwood Open Door's largest fundraising activity. Trivia Night was hosted by broadcaster Liza Fromer in 2016 and 2017. In 2018 it was hosted by CBC news anchor, Dwight Drummond. Other hosts have included Broadcasters, Kevin Sylvester and Gill Deacon.

== See also ==
- Georgetown Car Barn, Washington DC - former car barn and now used by Georgetown University
- TSR Front Street horse stables/powerhouse - former TTC warehouse and converted into Young People's Theatre
